= List of tallest buildings in Metro Manila =

This list of tallest buildings in Metro Manila ranks buildings in Metro Manila by height. As of September 2026, the region is home to 1,192 buildings classified as tall buildings, including prominent skyscrapers reaching heights of 150 meters (492 feet) or more.

Metro Manila, the most populous metropolitan area in the Philippines, the seat of government and also the National Capital Region, is home to the tallest skyscrapers in the country. Prominent areas where skyscrapers stand are the Makati Central Business District, Rockwell Center and Makati Poblacion in Makati; Ortigas Center and the C-5 Corridor in Pasig–Mandaluyong–Quezon City; Bonifacio Global City in Taguig; Ermita, Malate and Binondo in the City of Manila; Eastwood City, Araneta City and the Quezon City Quadrangle in Quezon City; Robinsons Cybergate in Mandaluyong; Greenhills in San Juan; and Alabang in Muntinlupa.

The history of highrise buildings in Manila probably began with the construction of the eight-storey Manila Hotel in 1912, which is considered the first modern high-rise building in the Philippines. The constructions of high-rise buildings also shifted from the City of Manila to its surrounding area, including the transformation of Makati into the country's financial and business center in the 1960s.

The first skyscraper (150 meters and above) in the metropolis is the 44-storey Pacific Plaza Condominium, which was completed in 1992. Currently, the Metrobank Center is the tallest building in the Philippines since its completion in 2017 with a pinnacle height of 318 meters (1,043 ft).

== Tallest completed buildings ==
This list ranks the highest completed skyscrapers and buildings in Metro Manila — the National Capital Region of the Philippines as of June 2026. These stand at least 150 meters (492 ft) tall, based on standard height measurement according to Emporis and CTBUH (unless otherwise stated, the two sources agree on the height of a building). The list has a minimum height limit because there is a large number of highrises below that in Metro Manila and the term skyscraper usually refers to buildings as tall and taller.

An equal sign (=) following a rank indicates the same height between two or more structures, and the "Year" column indicates the year in which it was completed. Some authoritative sources are The Skyscraper Center, SKYDB, and Emporis.

The number of skyscrapers in the cities of the national capital district as of June 2026:

- Makati – 293
- Taguig – 254
- Quezon City – 228
- Pasig – 142
- Manila – 94
- Mandaluyong – 89
- Paranaque – 26
- Pasay – 24
- San Juan – 20

As of June 2026, there are 162 buildings in the list below.

Was the tallest building in the Philippines upon completion

Rank	Building	Location	Height (Emporis)	Floors	Year (est.)	Image	Notes	References
1	Metrobank Center	Taguig	318 m (1,043 ft)	66	2017		The tallest building in the Philippines since its completion earlier in 2017. CTBUH: 259.1 m (850 ft)	
2	PBCom Tower	Makati	258.6 m (848 ft)	52	2000		The tallest building in the Philippines, 2000–2017; Tallest building in Makati	
3	Trump Tower Manila	Makati	250.7 m (823 ft)	58	2017		2nd tallest residential building in the Philippines.	
4	The Gramercy Residences	Makati	250 m (820 ft)	73	2012		3rd tallest residential building in the Philippines. CTBUH: 243.9 m (800 ft)	
4	Discovery Primea	Makati	250 m (820 ft)	68	2014		CTBUH: 238.8 m (783 ft)	
4	Shangri-La at the Fort, Manila	Taguig	250 m (820 ft)	61	2016		CTBUH: 229.3 m (752 ft)	
7	Shang Salcedo Place	Makati	249.80 m (819.6 ft)	67	2017			
8	Mega Tower	Mandaluyong	249.7 m (819 ft)	50	2021		Tallest building in Mandaluyong	
9	Park Central South Tower	Makati	248 m (814 ft)	69	2022		CTBUH: 276 m (906 ft)	
10	Century Spire	Makati	245 m (804 ft)	60	2022			
11	The Imperium at Capitol Commons	Pasig	240 m (790 ft)	63	2020		Tallest building in Pasig	
12	Grand Riviera Suites	Manila	230 m (750 ft)	57	2014		Tallest building in Manila	
12	The Royalton at Capitol Commons	Pasig	230 m (750 ft)	65	2019			
14	One Shangri-La Place Tower North	Mandaluyong	227 m (745 ft)	64	2015		CTBUH: 222.3 m (729 ft)	
14	One Shangri-La Place Tower South	Mandaluyong	227 m (745 ft)	64	2015		CTBUH: 222.3 m (729 ft)	
14	The Suites at One Bonifacio High Street	Taguig	227 m (745 ft)	63	2019			
17	Corporate Finance Plaza	Pasig	226.3 m (742 ft)	57	2021			
18	Maven at Capitol Commons	Pasig	225 m (738 ft)	62	2023			
19	The Skysuites Tower	Quezon City	223 m (732 ft)	44	2018		Formerly known as the G.A. Sky Suites, construction started in 2007 but was halted in 2010. It was acquired by DoubleDragon Properties and resumed construction in 2014. Tallest building in Quezon City	
20	BSA Twin Tower 1	Mandaluyong	221.2 m (726 ft)	55	2000		Did not open to the public until 2011.	
20	BSA Twin Tower 2	Mandaluyong	221.2 m (726 ft)	55	2000		Did not open to the public until 2011.	
22	Alphaland Makati Place	Makati	220 m (720 ft)	55	2017			
23	GT International Tower	Makati	217.2 m (713 ft)	47	2001			
24	Garden Towers 2	Makati	215 m (705 ft)	60	2021			
25	The St. Francis Shangri-La Place Tower A	Mandaluyong	212.9 m (698 ft)	60	2009			
25	The St. Francis Shangri-La Place Tower B	Mandaluyong	212.9 m (698 ft)	60	2009			
27	Petron Megaplaza	Makati	210 m (690 ft)	45	1998		The tallest building in the Philippines from 1998 to 2000	
27	BDO Corporate Center	Mandaluyong	210 m (690 ft)	47	2015		CTBUH: 210.5 m (691 ft)	
27	The Rise Makati	Makati	210 m (690 ft)	63	2019			
27	Podium West Tower	Mandaluyong	210 m (690 ft)	48	2020			
27	Park Terraces Point Tower	Makati	210 m (690 ft)	59	2020			
32	The Knightsbridge Residences	Makati	209 m (686 ft)	62	2014			
33	Anchor Grandsuites	Manila	208 m (682 ft)	63	2022		Tallest building in Binondo and all of Chinatown all over the world	
34	UnionBank Plaza	Pasig	206.04 m (676.0 ft)	49	2004			
35	The Residences at Greenbelt – San Lorenzo Tower	Makati	204.01 m (669.3 ft)	57	2009			
35	Edades Tower	Makati	205 m (673 ft)	53	2014		CTBUH: 161.2 m (529 ft)	
37	The Exchange Square	Pasig	204 m (669 ft)	51	2025			
38	One San Miguel Avenue	Pasig	203 m (666 ft)	54	2001		CTBUH: 182.9 m (600 ft)	
38	1322 Golden Empire Tower	Manila	203 m (666 ft)	57	2002			
40	Primex Tower	San Juan	202.8 m (665 ft)	50	2023		CTBUH: 188 m (617 ft); Tallest building in San Juan	
41	One Corporate Centre	Pasig	202 m (663 ft)	54	2009			
42	One Rockwell West Tower	Makati	201.9 m (662 ft)	55	2010			
43	Philamlife Tower	Makati	200 m (660 ft)	48	2000			
43	Three Central Tower 2	Makati	200 m (660 ft)	53	2016			
43	Garden Towers 1	Makati	200 m (660 ft)	54	2021			
46	Milano Residences	Makati	196 m (643 ft)	53	2016			
47	Air Residences	Makati	195.6 m (642 ft)	60	2019			
48	The Proscenium Residences at The Proscenium at Rockwell	Makati	195.4 m (641 ft)	60	2021			
49	One Central Makati	Makati	195 m (640 ft)	50	2013			
50	Ayala Triangle Gardens North	Makati	194.6 m (638 ft)	40	2021			
51	8 Forbestown Road	Taguig	194 m (636 ft)	53	2013		CTBUH: 183 m (600 ft)	
52	Admiral Baysuites	Manila	193.2 m (634 ft)	52	2014			
53	RCBC Plaza Yuchengco Tower	Makati	192.03 m (630.0 ft)	46	2001			
54	Vion Tower	Makati	190.85 m (626.1 ft)	57	2025			
55	Anchor Skysuites	Manila	190.6 m (625 ft)	56	2013			
56	The Viridian in Greenhills	San Juan	190 m (620 ft)	53	2016			
57	Park Central South Tower	Makati	189 m (620 ft)	56	2025			
58	Jollibee Tower	Pasig	188 m (617 ft)	40	2019			
58	Alveo Financial Tower	Makati	188 m (617 ft)	49	2020		Formerly known as the JAKA Tower, construction started in 1996 but was halted in 1998. In 2014, it was acquired by Ayala Land and relaunched in 2015.	
60	The Westin Manila Sonata Place	Mandaluyong	187.7 m (616 ft)	51	2022			
61	Park Terraces Tower 1	Makati	187 m (614 ft)	49	2015			
61	Park Terraces Tower 2	Makati	187 m (614 ft)	49	2018			
63	Rufino Pacific Tower	Makati	186 m (610 ft)	41	1994		Tallest building in the Philippines from 1994 to 1997. CTBUH: 162 m (531 ft)	
63	Eastwood Global Plaza	Quezon City	186 m (610 ft)	49	2019			
65	Green Residences	Manila	185 m (607 ft)	52	2016			
65	GLAS Tower	Pasig	185 m (607 ft)	42	2020			
67	The Kirov Tower at The Proscenium at Rockwell	Makati	184.5 m (605 ft)	56	2020			
68	Verano Greenhills	San Juan	184 m (604 ft)	57	2024			
69	Summit One Tower	Mandaluyong	181.15 m (594.3 ft)	49	1998			
70
70	LKG Tower	Makati	180 m (590 ft)	38	2000			
70	The Shang Grand Tower	Makati	180 m (590 ft)	46	2006			
70	Tower 6789	Makati	180 m (590 ft)	34	2013		CTBUH: 180 m (590 ft)	
70	Marco Polo Ortigas Manila	Pasig	180 m (590 ft)	41	2014			
70	The Finance Centre	Taguig	180 m (590 ft)	43	2018		CTBUH: 180.2 m (591 ft)	
75	Pacific Plaza Tower 1	Taguig	179 m (587 ft)	52	2001			
75	Pacific Plaza Tower 2	Taguig	179 m (587 ft)	52	2001			
75	Avant-Garde Residences	Pasig	179 m (587 ft)	45	2012			
75	Admiral Grandsuites	Manila	179 m (587 ft)	43	2020			
79	Atlanta Centre	San Juan	178.5 m (586 ft)	37	1998			
80	Birch Tower	Manila	178 m (584 ft)	52	2012			
80	Aspire Tower at Nuvo City	Quezon City	178 m (584 ft)	48	2012			
82	The Sakura at The Proscenium at Rockwell	Makati	176.5 m (579 ft)	51	2018			
83	Uptown Park Suites I	Taguig	175.5 m (576 ft)	48	2019			
84	Robinsons Equitable Tower	Pasig	175 m (574 ft)	45	1997		Tallest building in the Philippines from 1997 to 1998	
85	One Vertis Plaza	Quezon City	174.7 m (573 ft)	41	2024			
86	The Connor	San Juan	174.5 m (573 ft)	55	2023			
87	One Roxas Triangle	Makati	174.25 m (571.7 ft)	51	2000			
87	Two Roxas Triangle	Makati	174.25 m (571.7 ft)	51	2019			
87	R Square Residences	Manila	174.25 m (571.7 ft)	52	2022			
90	Paragon Plaza	Mandaluyong	174 m (571 ft)	43	1998			
90	Robinsons Summit Center	Makati	174 m (571 ft)	38	2001			
92	Twin Oaks Place West Tower	Mandaluyong	173 m (568 ft)	51	2014		CTBUH: 171.6 m (563 ft)	
92	Twin Oaks Place East Tower	Mandaluyong	173 m (568 ft)	51	2018			
94	Enterprise Center Tower One	Makati	172 m (564 ft)	45	1999			
95	The Residences at Greenbelt – Laguna Tower	Makati	171 m (561 ft)	48	2008			
95	The Residences at Greenbelt – Manila Tower	Makati	171 m (561 ft)	48	2010			
97	RCBC Plaza Tower 2	Makati	170 m (560 ft)	41	2001			
97	Trion Towers 1	Taguig	170 m (560 ft)	49	2012			
97	The Beacon – Arnaiz Tower	Makati	170 m (560 ft)	50	2013		CTBUH: 197 m (646 ft)	
97	Trion Towers 2	Taguig	170 m (560 ft)	49	2015			
97	Noble Place	Manila	170 m (560 ft)	47	2018			
97	Uptown Ritz Residence	Taguig	170 m (560 ft)	45	2018			
97	Trion Towers 3	Taguig	170 m (560 ft)	49	2019			
97	Makati Commerce Tower	Makati	170 m (560 ft)	36	2022			
97	Solaire Resort North	Quezon City	170 m (560 ft)	40	2024			
106	West Gallery Place	Taguig	169.1 m (555 ft)	50	2021			
107	East Gallery Place	Taguig	168.7 m (553 ft)	50	2021			
108	Altaire Tower	Makati	168.3 m (552 ft)	45	2025			
109	Pearl of the Orient Tower	Manila	168 m (551 ft)	42	2004			
110	Discovery Suites	Pasig	167 m (548 ft)	40	1999			
110	RCBC Savings Bank Corporate Center	Taguig	167 m (548 ft)	37	2013			
112	Exquadra (Unioil) Tower	Pasig	166.6 m (547 ft)	38	2020			
113	GA Twin Tower I	Mandaluyong	165.3 m (542 ft)	40	2005			
113	GA Twin Tower II	Mandaluyong	165.3 m (542 ft)	40	2008			
115	One Rockwell East Tower	Makati	165.2 m (542 ft)	45	2011			
116	Flair Towers – South Tower	Mandaluyong	165 m (541 ft)	52	2014			
116	Flair Towers – North Tower	Mandaluyong	165 m (541 ft)	52	2015			
116	Torre de Manila	Manila	165 m (541 ft)	47	2019			
116	Shang Residences Wack Wack	Mandaluyong	165 m (541 ft)	50	2024			
120	The Seasons Residences - Natsu Tower	Taguig	164 m (538 ft)	46	2025			
121	One Uptown Residence	Taguig	163 m (535 ft)	45	2018		CTBUH: 147 m (482 ft)	
121	Grand View Tower	Pasay	163 m (535 ft)	46	2023		Tallest building in Pasay	
123	Park Triangle Residences	Taguig	162.7 m (534 ft)	49	2022			
124	Seven/NEO	Taguig	162 m (531 ft)	38	2016			
124	18 Avenue de Triomphe	Pasig	162 m (531 ft)	43	2023			
126	Rizal Tower	Makati	161 m (528 ft)	47	2000		CTBUH: 156 m (512 ft)	
127	The Lincoln Tower at The Proscenium at Rockwell	Makati	160.5 m (527 ft)	47	2013			
128	Ayala Tower One	Makati	160 m (520 ft)	35	1996		First building in the Philippines to be known as a "skyscraper"	
128	Orient Square	Pasig	160 m (520 ft)	38	1999			
128	Soho Central	Mandaluyong	160 m (520 ft)	41	2008			
128	ADB Avenue Tower	Pasig	160 m (520 ft)	40	2014			
128	Uptown Park Suites II	Taguig	160 m (520 ft)	48	2019			
128	Victoria Sports Tower A	Quezon City	160 m (520 ft)	46	2019			
128	Victoria Sports Tower B	Quezon City	160 m (520 ft)	46	2019			
135	Lancaster Suites One	Mandaluyong	158 m (518 ft)	42	2007			
135	The Beacon – Roces Tower	Makati	158 m (518 ft)	44	2011			
135	The Beacon – Amorsolo Tower	Makati	158 m (518 ft)	44	2016			
138	Kroma Tower	Makati	157 m (515 ft)	52	2018			
139	Bellagio Towers C	Taguig	156 m (512 ft)	40	2010			
139	I'M Hotel	Makati	156 m (512 ft)	45	2017			
139	The Lorraine Tower at The Proscenium at Rockwell	Makati	156 m (512 ft)	56	2020			
139	University Tower España	Manila	156 m (512 ft)	52	2024			
143	Exportbank Plaza	Makati	155 m (509 ft)	36	1998			
143	Zuellig Building	Makati	155 m (509 ft)	42	2012			
143	The Seasons Residences - Haru Tower	Taguig	155 m (509 ft)	41	2023			
146	BSA Tower Makati	Makati	153.9 m (505 ft)	37	1998	BSA Suites, Makati		
147	Trium Square	Pasay	153 m (502 ft)	39	2022			
148	The World Centre	Makati	152.4 m (500 ft)	30	1995			
149	Dream Tower at Nuvo City	Quezon City	152.3 m (500 ft)	48	2019			
150	Salcedo Park Twin Towers	Makati	151 m (495 ft)	41	1996			
151	Wharton Parksuites	Manila	150.75 m (494.6 ft)	39	2012			
152	Pacific Plaza Condominium	Makati	150 m (490 ft)	44	1992		Tallest building in the Philippines from 1992 to 1994; tallest observation tower in the Philippines	
152	Forbes Tower West (Fraser Place)	Makati	150 m (490 ft)	42	2000			
152	Four Seasons	Makati	150 m (490 ft)	37	2005			
152	One Legazpi Park	Makati	150 m (490 ft)	45	2006			
152	Joy‑Nostalg Center	Pasig	150 m (490 ft)	40	2009			
152	East Tower at One Serendra	Taguig	150 m (490 ft)	41	2012			
152	The Meranti	Taguig	150 m (490 ft)	45	2013			
152	University Tower P. Noval	Manila	150 m (490 ft)	47	2016			
152	27 Annapolis	San Juan, Metro Manila	150 m (490 ft)	45	2020			
152	Century Diamond Tower	Makati	150 m (490 ft)	41	2021			
152	One Filinvest	Pasig	150 m (490 ft)	35	2022			

Not included in the list are buildings which have heights that are only estimated based on floor counts. There are over 70 completed buildings falling under this category, some of which include One Eastwood Avenue Towers 1 and 2 (≈160 m and ≈188 m), West Tower at One Serendra (≈170–191 m), The BeauFort East and West Towers (≈161 m and ≈164 m), Acqua Private Residences Iguazu (≈207 m), Livingstone (≈196 m), Dettifoss (≈170 m), Sutherland (≈163 m), and Niagara (≈155 m) Towers, and The Infinity Fort Bonifacio (≈183–187 m).

Buildings which almost qualify are One McKinley Place (149 m) in Bonifacio Global City, Mandarin Square (149 m) in Binondo, and 8 Wack Wack Road (147 m) in Mandaluyong.

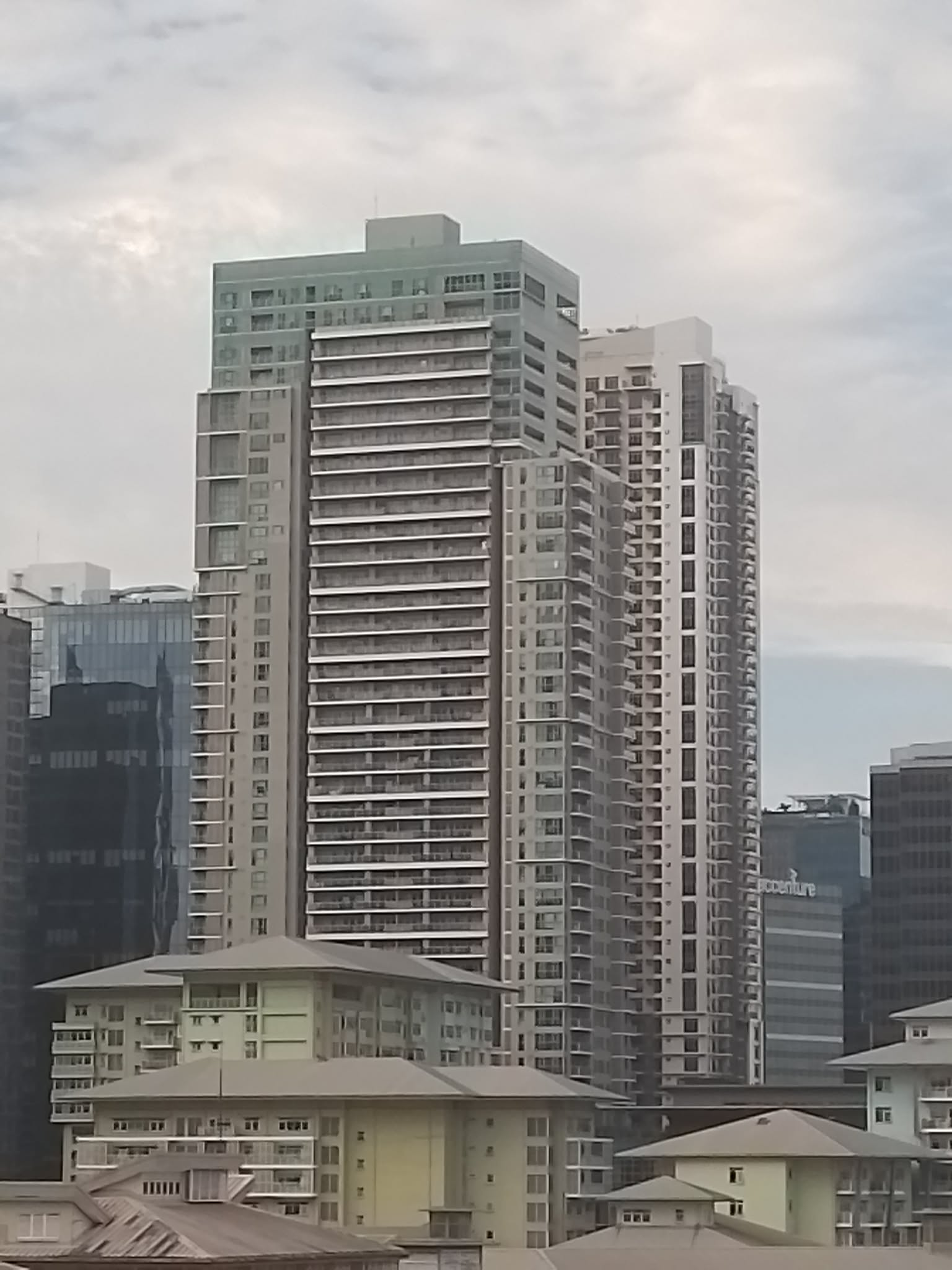
West Tower at One Serendra

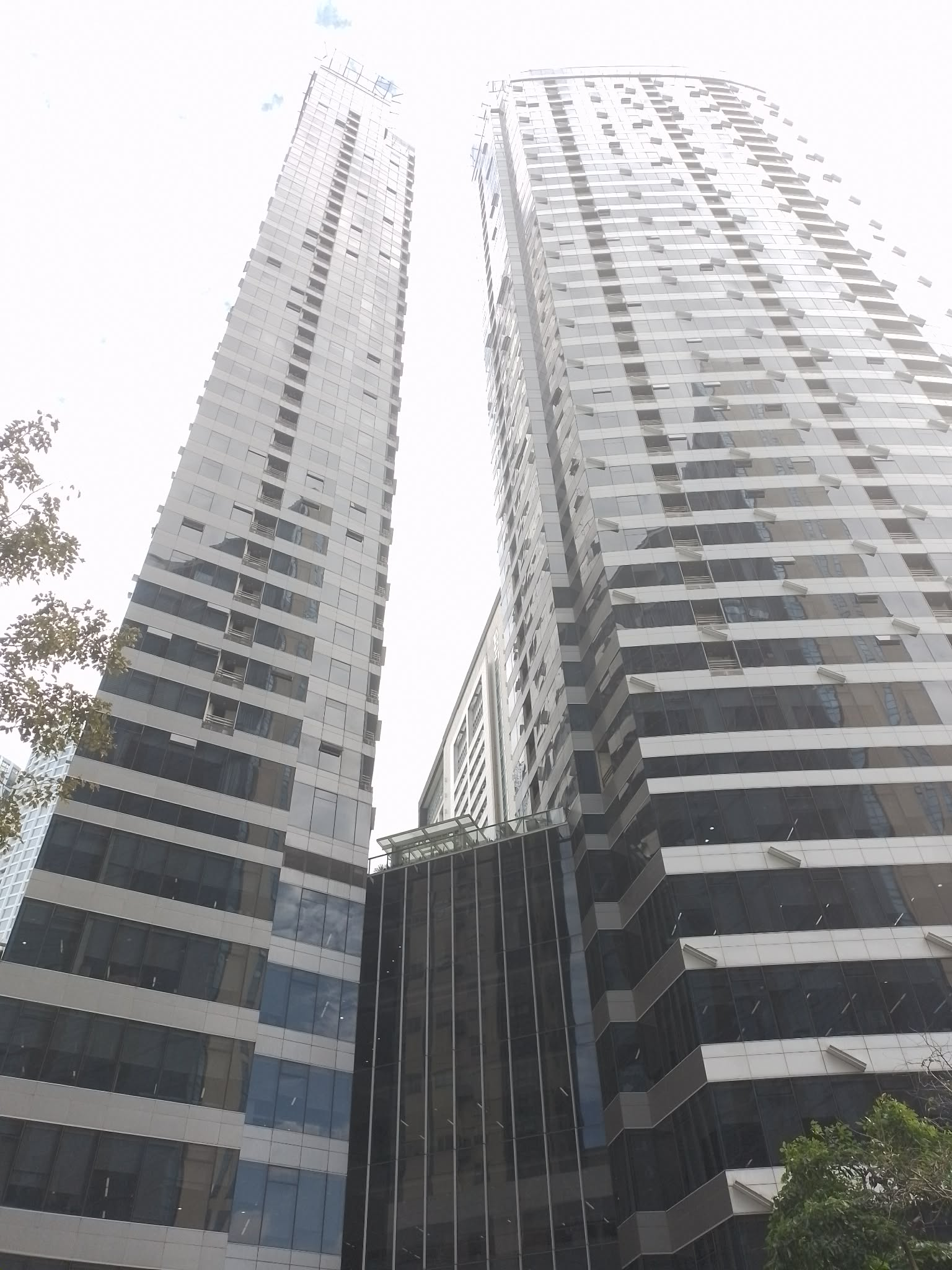
The Beaufort

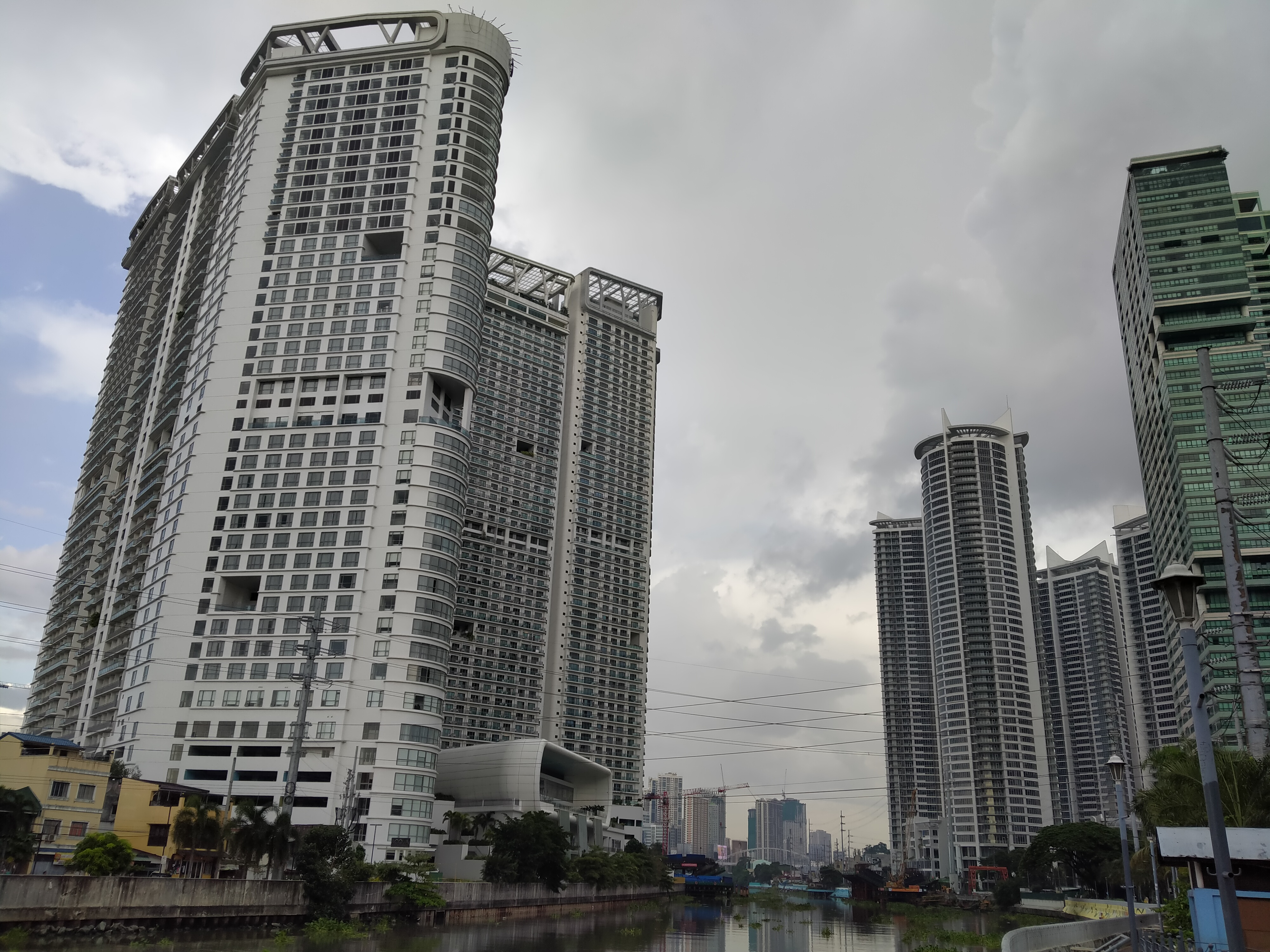
Acqua Private Residences (left)

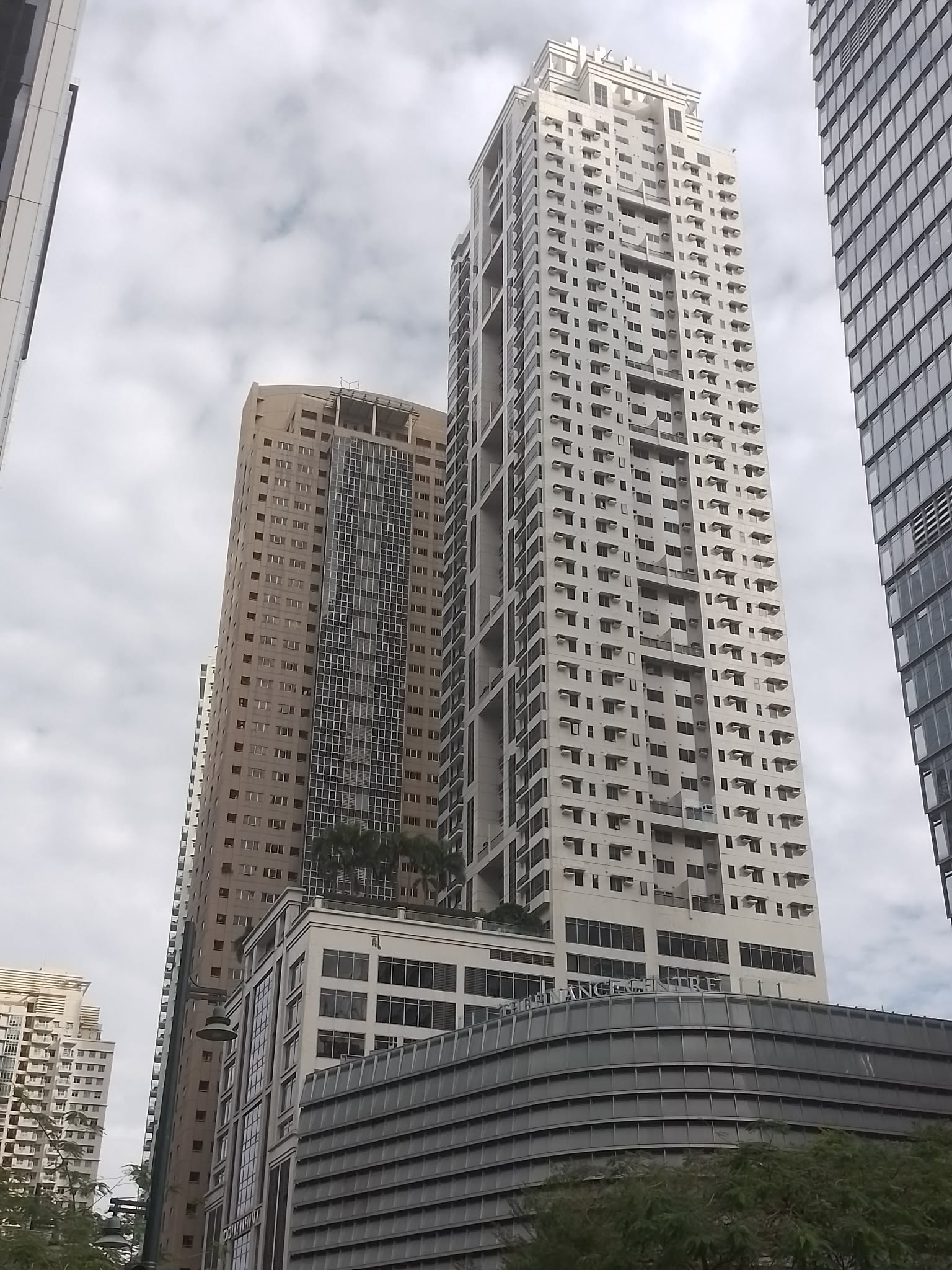
The Infinity Fort Bonifacio

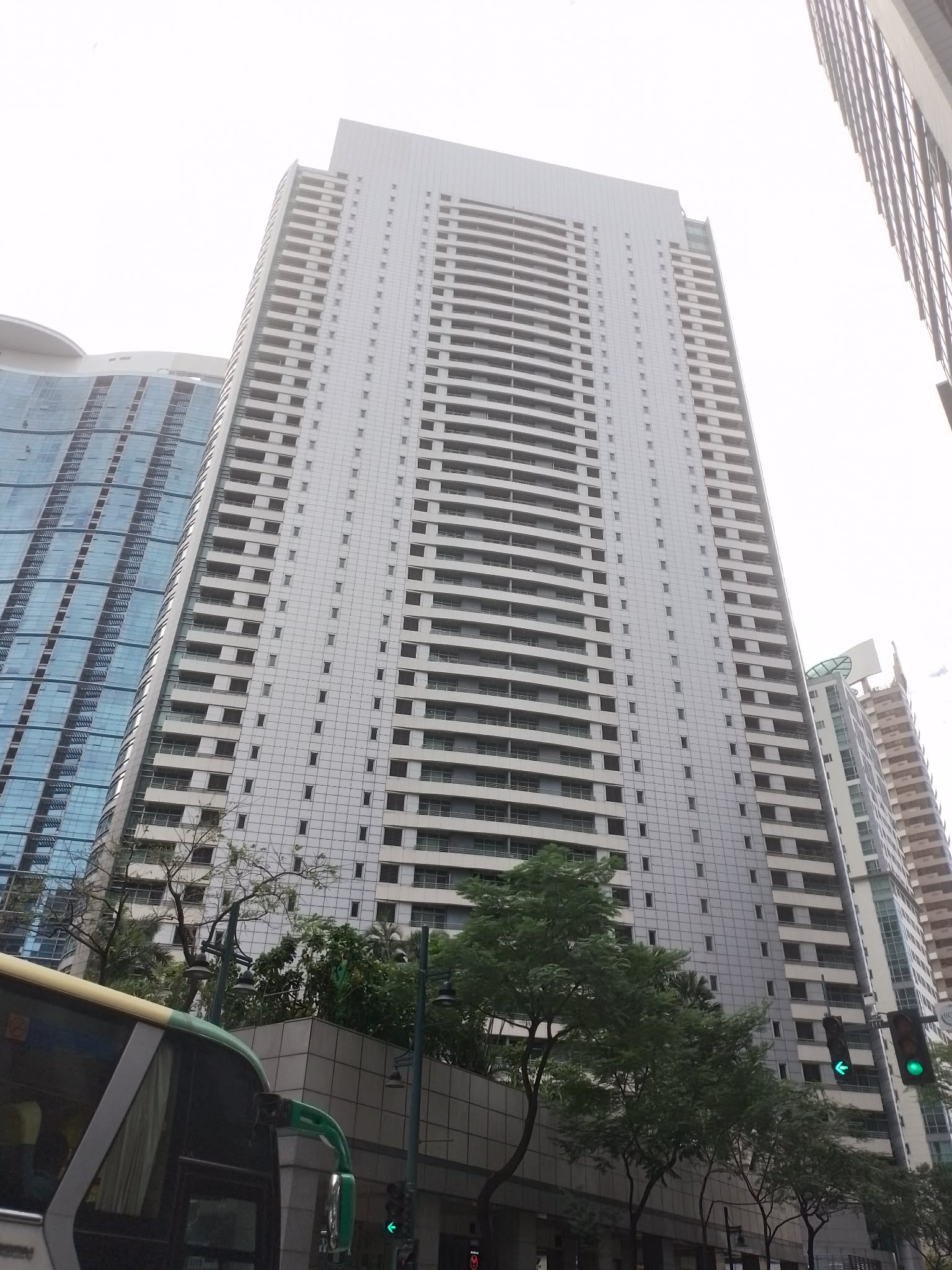
One McKinley Place

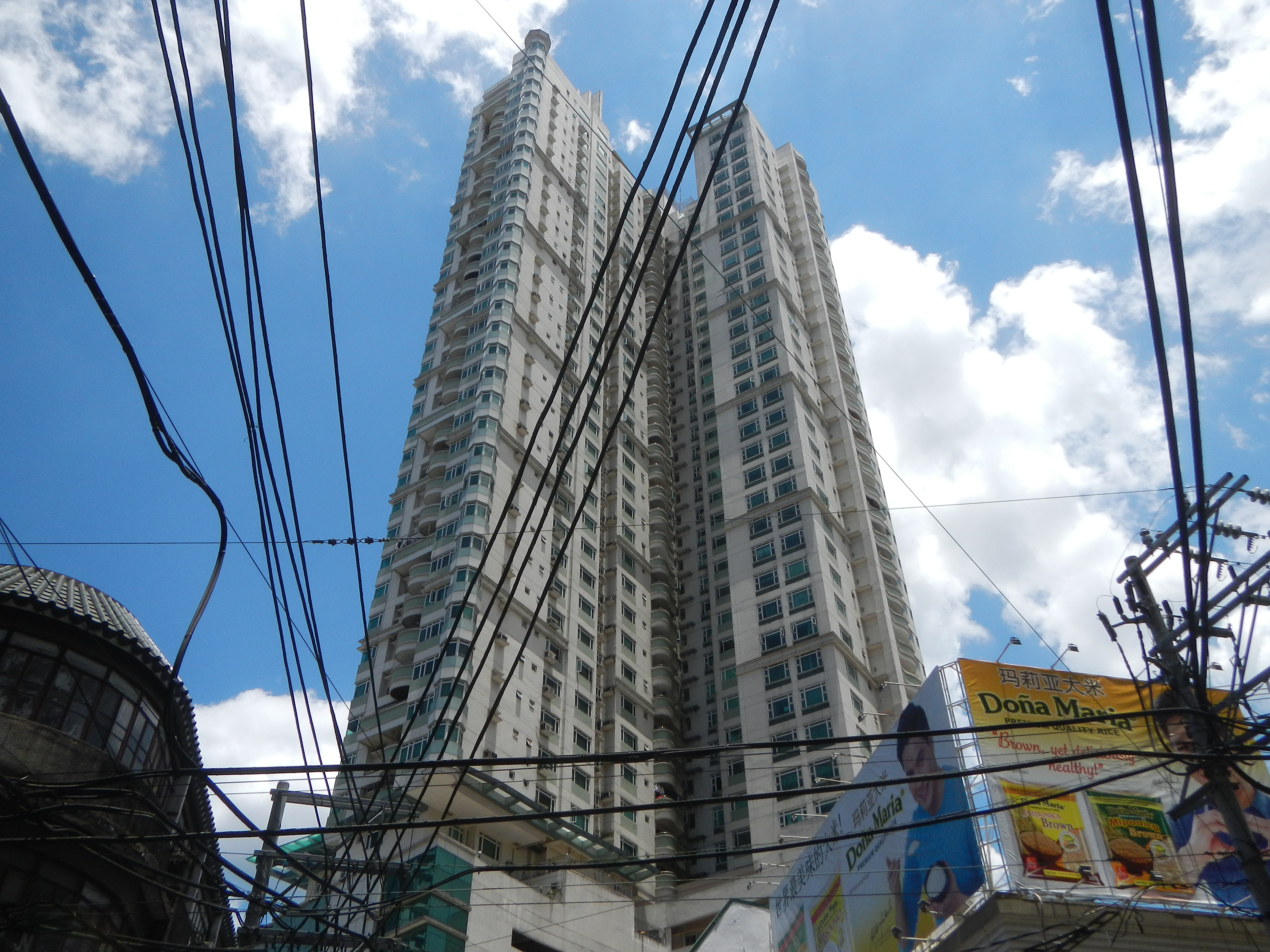
Mandarin Square

== Gallery ==
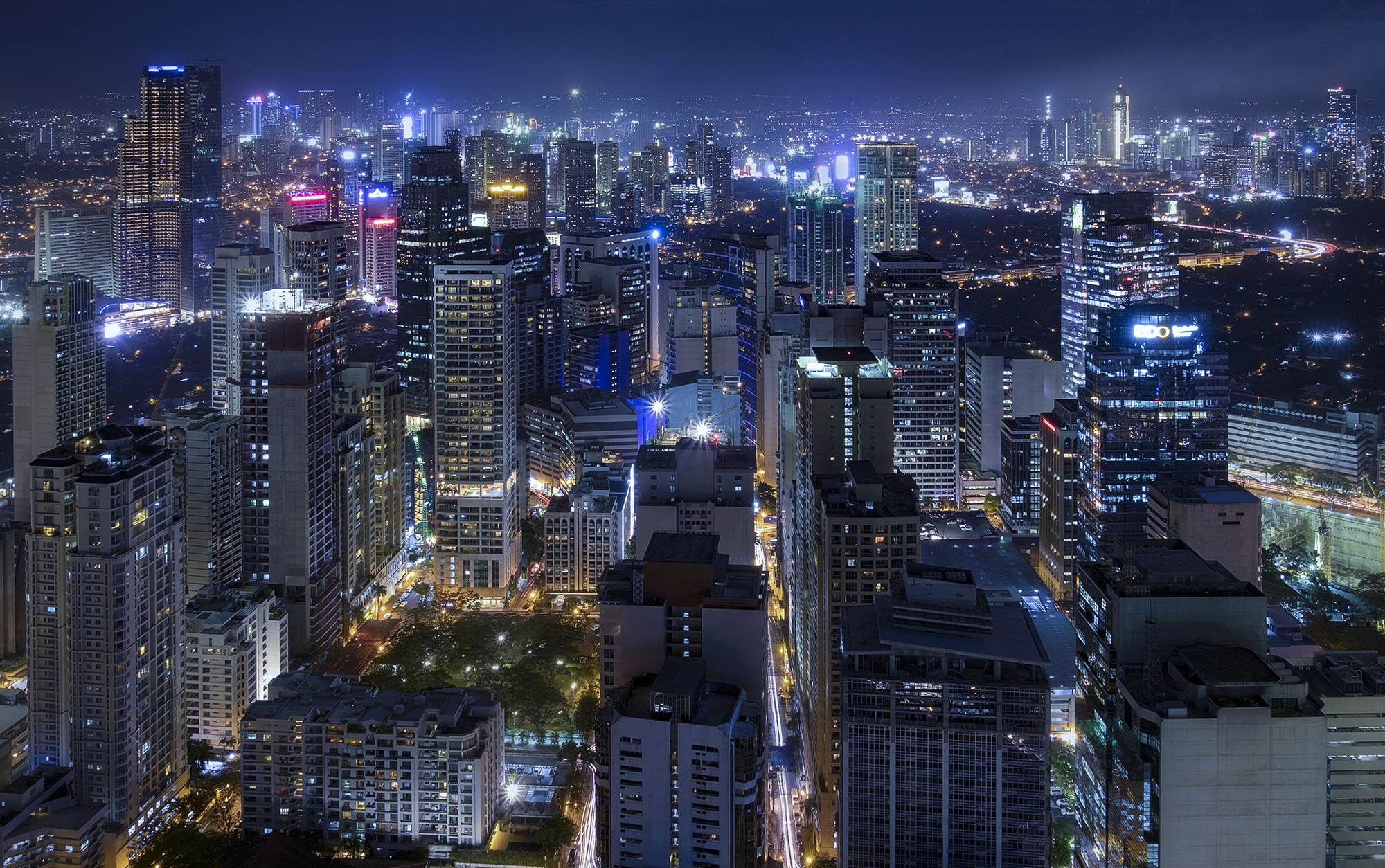
Makati Central Business District (2017)
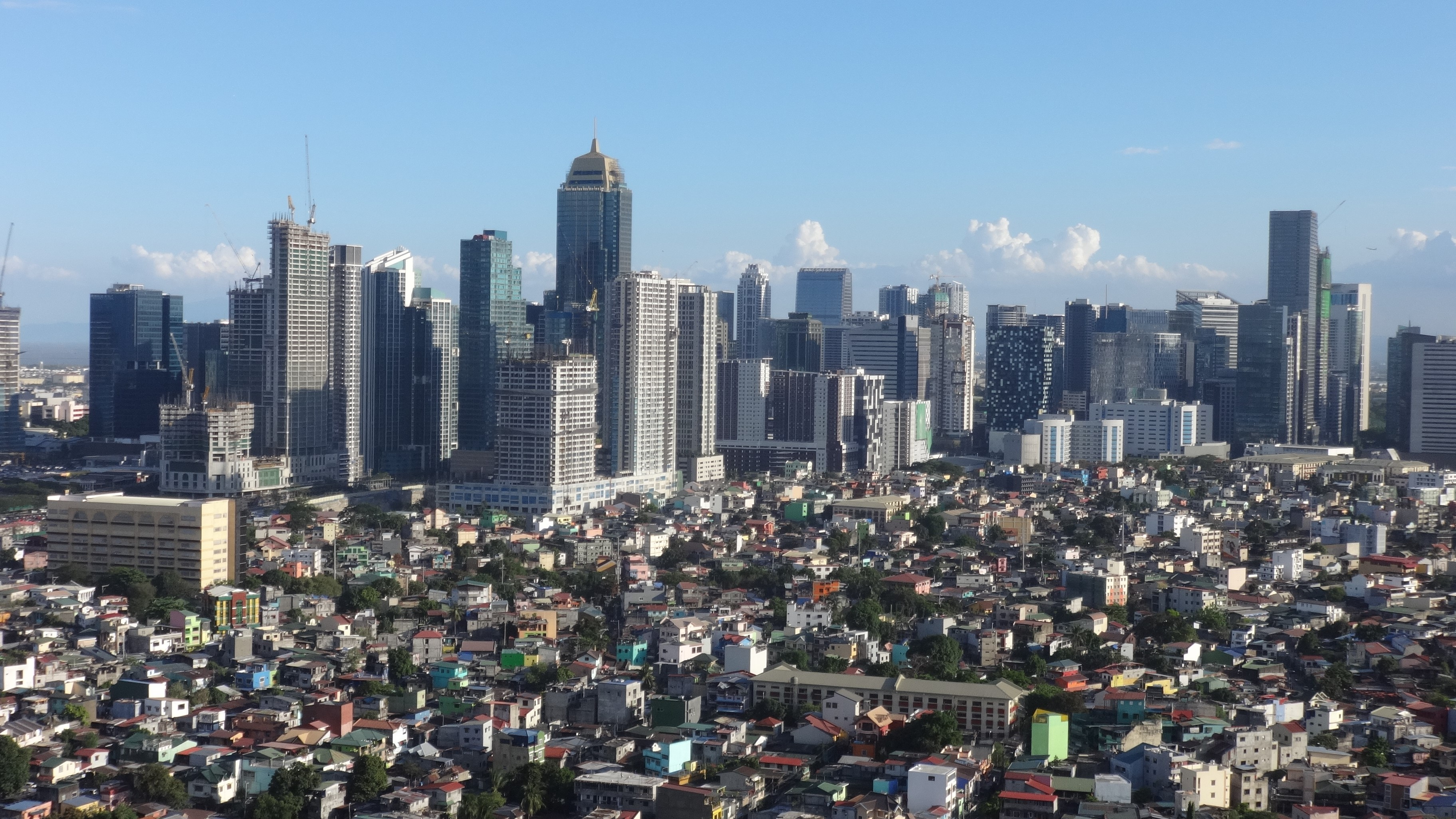
Bonifacio Global City (2018)
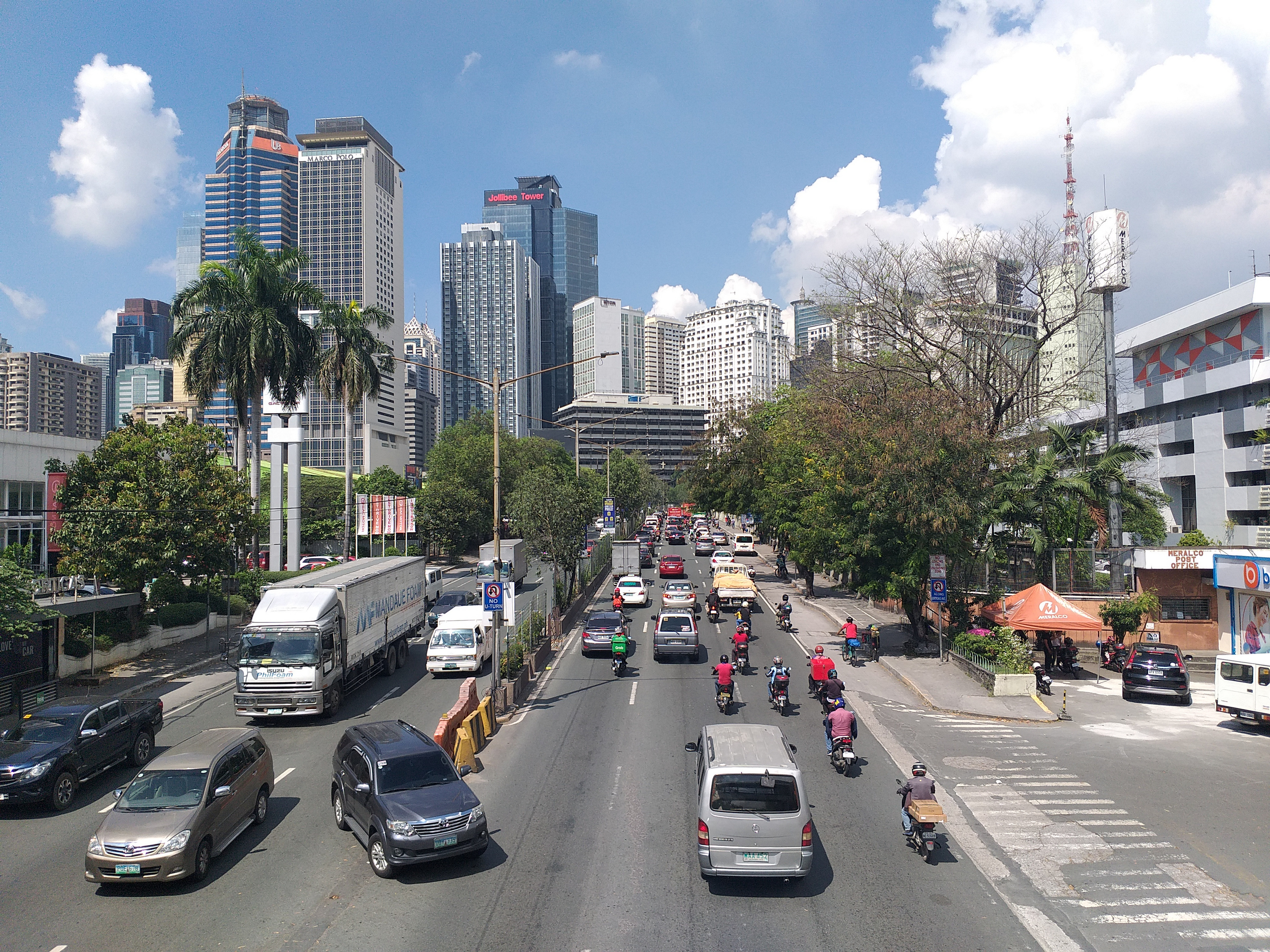
Ortigas Center (2021)
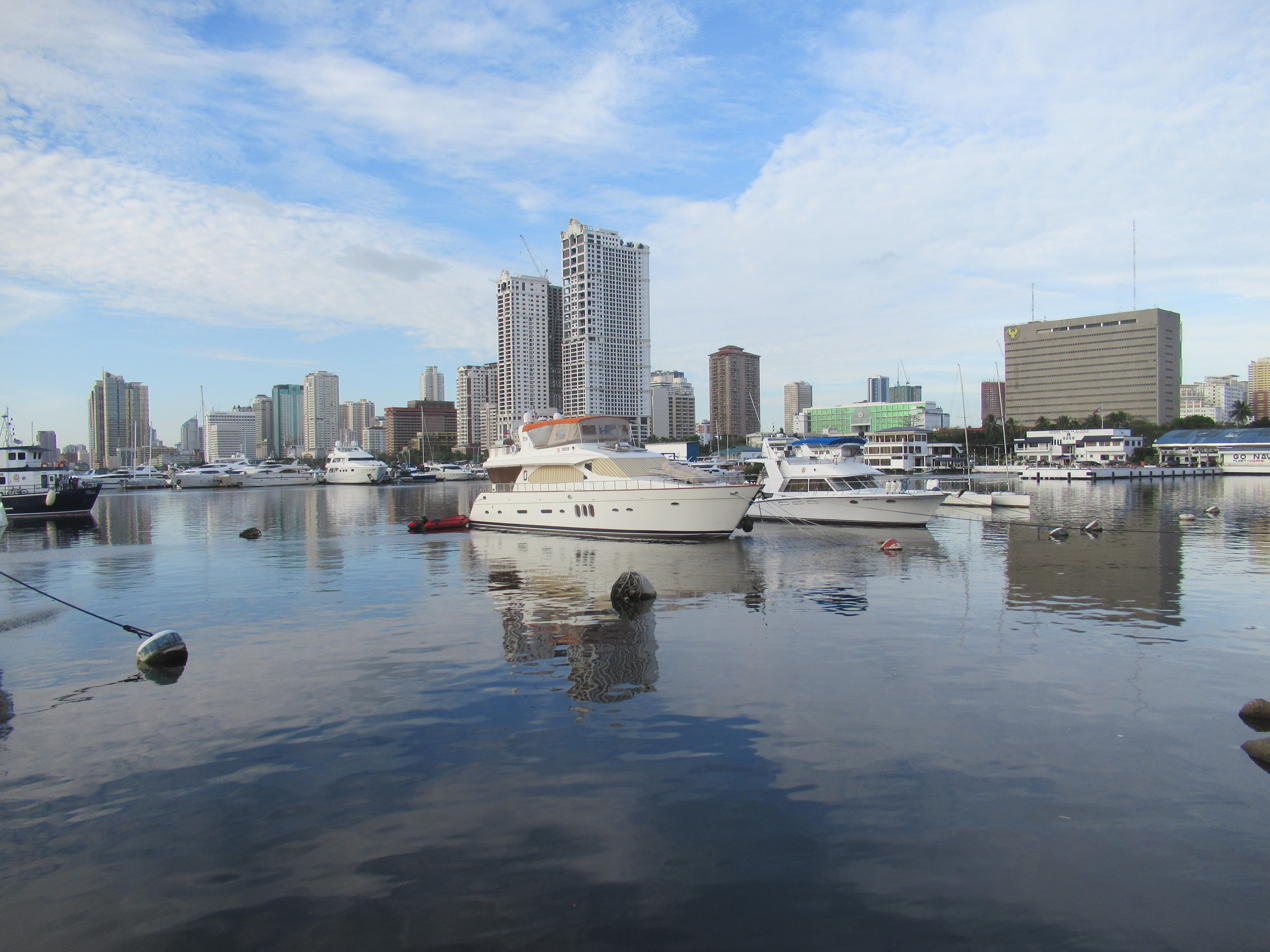
Ermita and Malate from Manila Bay (2023)
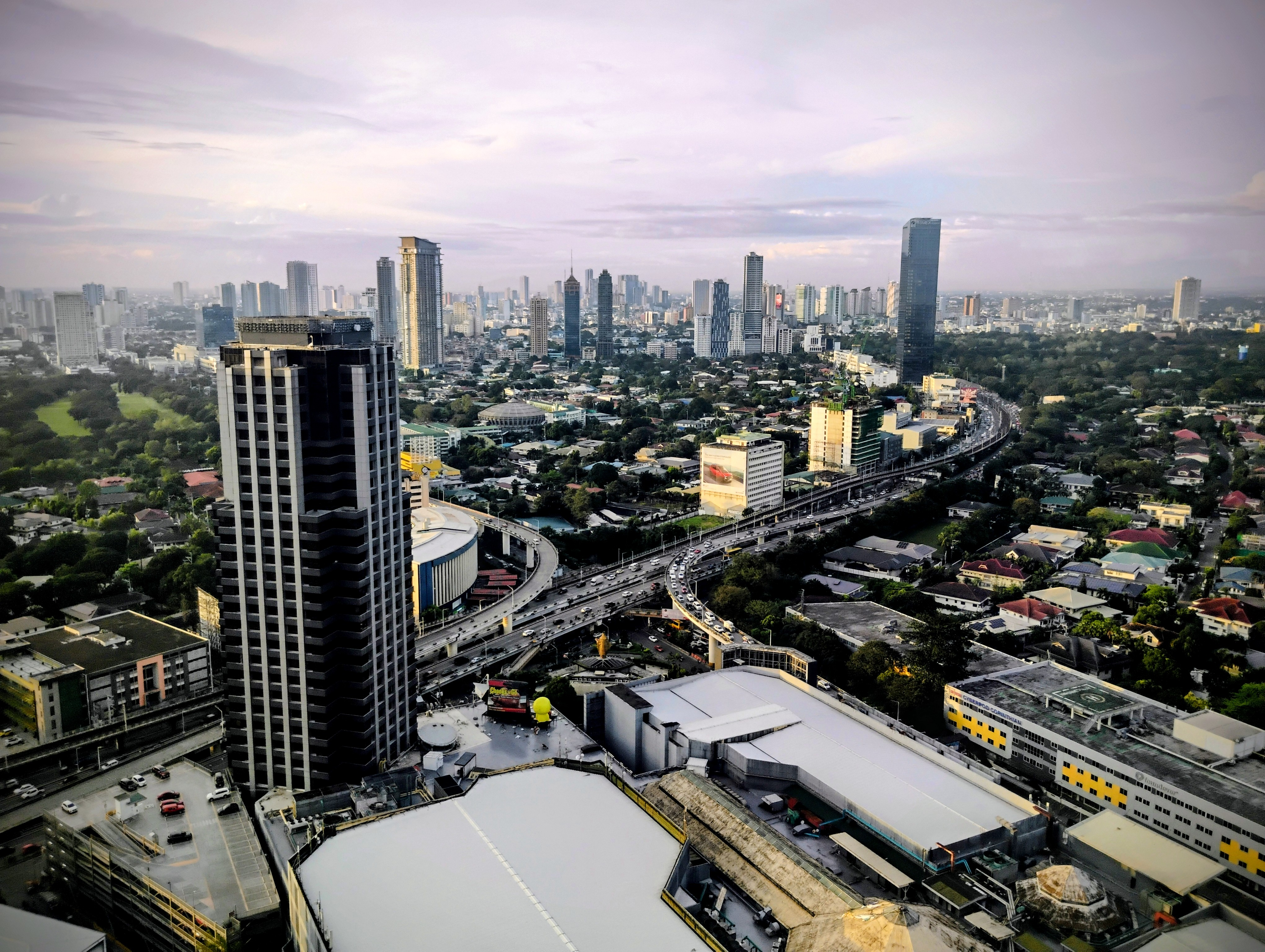
San Juan and Quezon City from Ortigas Center (2025)

== Tallest completed twin buildings ==
Twin towers refer to identical structure buildings including condominiums, apartments, offices and hotels. This list overlaps with the first list above but also includes those taller than 100 m. Ortigas Center's One Shangri-La Place is one of the top 20 tallest twin buildings in the world.

Rank	Name	Location	Height (max)	Floors (T1/T2)	Year	Notes	Source
1	One Shangri-La Place Twin Towers	Ortigas Center	222.3 m (729 ft)	65/65	2014	Tallest twin towers in the Philippines	
2	BSA Twin Towers	Ortigas Center	221.2 m (726 ft)	54/54	2011		
3	The St. Francis Shangri-La Place	Ortigas Center	212.9 m (698 ft)	60/60	2009		
4	One Eastwood Avenue Towers	Eastwood City	189 m (620 ft)/ 160 m (525 ft)	47/52	2017/2019		
5	Park Terraces Towers 1 and 2	Makati CBD	187 m (614 ft)	49/49	2016/2018		
6	Pacific Plaza Towers	Bonifacio Global City	179 m (587 ft)	52/52	2001		
7	Twin Oaks Place	Mandaluyong	173 m (568 ft)/ 171.6 m (563 ft)	51/51	2018/2014		
8	Salcedo Park Twin Towers	Makati CBD	168.3 m (552 ft)/ 153.3 m (503 ft)	45/45	1996		
9	GA Twin Towers	Mandaluyong	165.3 m (542 ft)	30/30	2005/2008		
10	Flair Towers	Mandaluyong	165 m (541 ft)	48/48	2015/2014		
11	The BeauFort Towers	Bonifacio Global City	164.33 m (539 ft)/ 160.51 m (527 ft)	42/43	2013		
12	One Eastwood Avenue Towers	Eastwood City	189 m (620 ft)/ 160 m (525 ft)	47/52	2017/2019		
13	The Columns at Legazpi Village	Makati CBD	146 m (479 ft)	41/41	2011		
14	Insular Life Corporate Towers	Alabang	140 m (459 ft)/ 124 m (407 ft)	34/30	2001		
15	Wack Wack Twin Towers	Mandaluyong	140 m (459 ft)/ 124 m (407 ft)	30/30	1994		
16	Robinsons Place Residences	Ermita	137 m (449 ft)	38/38	2002		

== Tallest under construction or proposed ==
As of January 2026, this lists more than 40 highrise and supertall buildings under construction or preparation that are expected to rise 150 metres (492 ft) or more in Metro Manila.

The Philippine Diamond Tower, estimated to have a height of 612 m and finished by 2019, is a broadcast tower, not a residential or commercial building (but was cancelled for unknown reasons). Skycity, estimated to have a height of 335 m but troubled by a lawsuit, only has had excavation work done and has been on-hold with no construction progress since 2005.

Topping out (or topping off) is when the last beam (or its equivalent) is placed atop a structure. For convenience, the entries of the sortable table is arranged alphabetically.

The tallest entry in the table is The Stratford Residences at 312 meters.

Name	Location	Height (m)	Floors	Expected completion	Notes
Alloro Residenza	Manila	182.6	45	?	Planned
Amani Tower	Taguig	167.3	35	2028	Under construction
Angela Apartments	Manila	208	61	2024	Planned
Aurelia Residences	Taguig	187	55	2026	Topped off
Avenir Tri-Tower 1	Makati	180	54	2023	On hold
Avenir Tri-Tower 2	Makati	180	54	2023	On hold
Avenir Tri-Tower 3	Makati	180	54	2023	On hold
New BDO Corporate Center Makati - North Tower	Makati	220	48	2028	Under construction
New BDO Corporate Center Makati - South Tower	Makati	272	55	2028	Under construction
BPI Headquarters	Makati	224	45	2028	Under construction
BWDC Residential Tower	Taguig	217	45	2026	Under construction
Chinabank Makati Tower	Makati	180	32	2028	Under construction
DDT Sky Tower (947 Sky Towers)	Quezon City	280	60	2024	On hold
Haraya Residences - North Tower	Pasig	179.4	54	?	Under construction
Haraya Residences - South Tower	Pasig	224.75	68	2028	Under construction
Laya	Pasig	206	67	2028	Under construction
My Ensō Lofts	Quezon City	174.76	45	2025	Under construction
Metrobank & Trust Company Headquarters Office	Makati	177	35	?	Under construction
MetroCity Tower	Pasig	180	50	2024	Planned
One Legacy Grandsuites	Manila	226.6	69	?	Under construction
One Shang Central	Mandaluyong	238	60	2026	Under construction
Park Royal Ongpin (Omni Garden)	Manila	213	52	2022	Planned
Parklinks North Tower	Quezon City	193	55	2025	Topped off
Parklinks South Tower	Quezon City	193	55	2029	Under construction
Residences at The Galleon	Pasig	227.5	51	2028	Under construction
Shang Summit East Tower	Quezon City	250	80	2030	Under construction
Shang Summit West Tower	Quezon City	250	80	?	Planned
T-One Residences	Manila	196	63	2025	Topped off
The Chronicle	Pasig	180	40	2023	Planned
The Estate Makati	Makati	276.8	54	2026	Topped off
The Residences at Paragon Centre	San Juan	198.97	53	2026	Topped off
The Seasons Residences - Aki Tower	Taguig	177	47	2026	Topped off
The Seasons Residences - Fuyu Tower	Taguig	185	51	2027	Topped off
The Stratford Residences	Makati	312	76	2027	Under construction
UNTV Broadcast Center	Quezon City	222	37	2026	Under construction
Victoria Arts and Theater Tower	Quezon City	177	55	2024	Under construction
Victoria de Malate Tower 1	Manila	156	45	2025	Topped off
Victoria de Malate Tower 2	Manila	156	45	2025	Topped off
Victoria De Valenzuela	Valenzuela	178	42	2024	Planned
Vivo Garden Tower 1	Caloocan	157	43	2023	Topped off
Vivo Garden Tower 2	Caloocan	157	43	2023	Planned

=== Tallest planned or proposed ===
These are the tallest planned buildings for Metro Manila that are 200 meters or taller but do not yet have a proposed completion year.

Name	Location	Height (m)	Floors	Status
El Pueblo	Pasig	263.25	63	Planned
Icone Tower	Taguig	275	36	Planned
I-Conic Tower	Pasig	200	63	Proposed
Feilong Dijing	Manila	268.8	73	Proposed
Sapphire Tower	Pasig	304.8	67–70	Planned
The Block – Hyundai National Headquarters	Taguig	250	56	Proposed

== Timeline of tallest buildings ==
This lists buildings that once held the title of tallest building in the Philippines. Other buildings such as churches with tall spires may be taller but are not listed because there are no data available from the time Manila had its first building.

Name	Location	Years as tallest	Height (m)	Floors	Image	Notes
Manila Hotel	Ermita, Manila	1912–27		5		
University of Santo Tomas Main Building	Sampaloc, Manila	1927–67	48 m (157 ft)	8		Four floors of the main building, another four on the tower.
Ramon Magsaysay Center	Malate	1967–1968	70	18		
Manila Pavilion Hotel	Ermita	1968–1989	90	22		To be known as Waterfront Manila Hotel & Casino as soon as Phase 1 of the original hotel's post-2018 fire reconstruction is completed.
Pacific Star Building	Makati CBD	1989–1991	112.5	29		
The Peak Tower	Makati CBD	1991–1992	138	38		
Pacific Plaza Condominium	Makati CBD	1992–1994	150	44		
Rufino Pacific Tower	Makati CBD	1994–1997	162	41		
Robinsons Equitable Tower	Ortigas Center	1997–1998	175	45		
Petron Megaplaza	Makati CBD	1998–2000	210	45		
PBCom Tower	Makati CBD	2000–2017	259	52		
Metrobank Center	Bonifacio Global City	2017–present	318	66		

== See also ==
- List of cities with the most skyscrapers
- Tallest buildings in the Philippines
