= Sky City =

Skycity or Sky City may refer to:

== Businesses and commercial buildings ==
- DJI Sky City, a two-tower building in Nanshan, Shanzhen, China
- Sky City (shopping mall), a shopping mall in Zhubei, Hsinchu County, Taiwan
- Sky City (store), a defunct American retail chain
- SkyCity, a restaurant atop the Space Needle in Seattle, Washington, US
- SkyCity Entertainment Group, a New Zealand–based casino corporation
  - SkyCity Adelaide, or Adelaide Casino, owned by the group

== Skyscrapers ==
- Sky City (Changsha), a cancelled skyscraper, previously planned to be built in Changsha, China
- Skycity (Mandaluyong), a skyscraper in Mandaluyong, Philippines

== Places ==
- Acoma Pueblo or Sky City, a town in New Mexico, US
- Hong Kong SkyCity, near Hong Kong International Airport
- Sky City, a part of Stockholm Arlanda Airport, Sweden

== Music ==
- Sky City (album), an album by Amason
- "Sky City", a 2024 song by ¥$ from Vultures 2

== See also ==
- Sky City 1000, a Japanese urban development program
