= List of destroyed heritage of the Philippines =

The following is a list of destroyed heritage in the Philippines. This includes sites which has been totally destroyed either deliberately or through a natural disaster. These were considered as heritage sites at the time of their destruction.

== List ==
=== Presumed Important Cultural Properties ===
The following are noted by reliable sources as presumably Important Cultural Properties due to their old age (50+ years at the time of their destruction) or a work by a National Artist.

Site	Picture	Location	Built	Destroyed	Notes	Ref.
BDO Corporate Center Makati (formerly the PCI Bank Towers)		Makati, Metro Manila	—N/a	2022	Work of National Artist of the Philippines, Leandro Locsin	
Capitol Theater		Manila	1930	2020		
Don Tio Bonpu Heritage House		Oslob, Cebu	1919	2017	Local Heritage Site	
Philippine National Bank Building		Manila	1965	2016		
Relief Map of the Philippines		Manila	Late-1960s	2023		
Sta. Cruz Building		Manila	1948	2021	Fenced in April 2019 reportedly for demolition. Fire razed the site in October 2019.	

=== Reconstructed ===
The following a heritage (with official designation at the time of their destruction) which were destroyed and later rebuilt.

Site	Picture (Note: Photograph of original structure)	Location	Built	Destroyed	Reconstructed	Designation	Notes	Ref.
Loon Church		Loon, Bohol	1864	2013	2021	National Cultural Treasure (2010); National Historical Landmark (2010)	Destroyed by the 2013 Bohol earthquake	
Maribojoc Church		Maribojoc, Bohol	1872	2013	2021	National Cultural Treasure (2010)	Destroyed by the 2013 Bohol earthquake	
