= The St. Francis Shangri-La Place =

- Interactive map of the The St. Francis Shangri-La Place area

General information
- Status: Completed
- Type: Residential
- Location: Shaw Boulevard cor. St. Francis St., Ortigas Center, Mandaluyong, Philippines
- Coordinates: 14°34′48.45″N 121°3′22.89″E
- Construction started: January 2005
- Completed: 2009
- Opening: 2009
- Cost: ₱3 billion
- Owner: Kuok Group

Height
- Antenna spire: 212.88 m (698.4 ft)

Technical details
- Floor count: 60 aboveground, 5 belowground
- Lifts/elevators: 7

Design and construction
- Architects: Wong Tung International Ltd. Recio + Casas Architects
- Developer: Shang Properties, Inc.
- Structural engineer: Ove Arup & Partners Hong Kong Ltd. Magnusson Klemencic Associates
- Main contractor: EEI Corporation

The St. Francis Shangri-La Place, also known as The St. Francis Towers 1 & 2 are twin-tower residential condominium skyscrapers in Mandaluyong, Philippines. The towers are the 6th and 7th-tallest buildings in the country and Metro Manila as well, and are currently the second tallest twin towers in the Philippines surpassing Pacific Plaza Towers with a height of 212.88 metres from the ground to its architectural spire. It also has two of the most floors in the Philippines. The buildings have 60 floors above ground, including a podium which connects the two towers, and 5 basement levels for parking, and are considered one of the most prestigious residential buildings in the Philippines.

== Construction ==
Groundbreaking for the towers were held in January 2005, months ahead of its official launching. Topping-off ceremonies was held on June 24, 2008, although only one tower was actually considered topped-off during that time.

The towers were completed and opened in 2009 and took over the title of the tallest twin-towers in the Philippines from Pacific Plaza Towers in Bonifacio Global City, though it was later taken by the nearby BSA Twin Towers when it was completed in 2011.

== Architecture and design ==
The St. Francis Shangri-La Place was masterplanned and designed by Wong Tung International Ltd., in cooperation with local architectural firm Recio + Casas Architects. Structural design for the building was provided by Arup, and reviewed by international engineering firm Magnusson Klemencic Associates.

The buildings mechanical, electrical, and santiray engineering works was designed by WSP Hong Kong Ltd. Interior design was made by Brennan Beer Gorman Monk Architects (Interior Design).

The construction team is composed of Jose Aliling & Associates (Project / Construction Management); Davis Langdon & Seah Philippines Inc. (Quantity Surveying); and EEI Corporation (General Contractor).

=== Structural dampers ===
Due to the tower's location being close to an active fault in a highly seismic region and also subjected to typhoon winds, the St. Francis Shangri-La Place was the first building in the world to feature a revolutionary ‘damping’ system designed by international engineering company Ove Arup & Partners. The new system, which minimizes the standard wobble in high-rise buildings, employs the same technology used to strengthen the Millennium Bridge in London. This makes the St. Francis Shangri-La Place one of the safest buildings.

The usual methods employed to strengthen buildings are to reinforce it with significant extra structure or to install tuned mass dampers. Both methods are not only expensive, but also make the building stiffer and heavier while consuming valuable space. The Arup solution works by inserting Viscous Dampers into the St. Francis Shangri-La Place to act as energy absorbers and damp out vibrations. Viscous dampers connect deep reinforced concrete outriggers from the central core of each building to the perimeter columns at one level. The added damping so derived, in excess of 6% of critical controls wind-induced motions, achieving occupant comfort objectives, and reduces the design wind overturning moment by a factor of 1.7. Not only is this a lower-cost solution, it is also more sustainable as it uses less material, and leaves more valuable space inside the building.

Reductions in the quantities of concrete and reinforcing steel in the St Francis Towers structure due to the incorporation of the Arup damping system and performance based seismic design saved the building's developer in excess of $5 million in construction cost and more net floor space (through smaller columns and core walls, and no need for space for TMDs).

== See also ==
- The Shang Grand Tower
- List of tallest buildings in the Philippines

Records
Preceded by Pacific Plaza Towers	Tallest Twin Towers in the Philippines; 2009—Present	Incumbent
