= Pacific Plaza Towers =

- The Pacific Plaza Towers
- Interactive map of the Pacific Plaza Towers area

General information
- Status: Completed
- Type: Residential condominium
- Location: 4th Avenue; Bonifacio Global City; Metro Manila, Philippines
- Coordinates: 14°32′51.64″N 121°2′42.20″E
- Construction started: February 14, 1997
- Completed: September 2000
- Opening: February 22, 2001
- Owner: Metro Pacific Corporation (1997–2006); Pacific Plaza Towers Condominium Corporation (PPTCC) (2001–present)
- Operator: Pacific Plaza Towers Management Services, Inc.

Height
- Roof: 179 m (587.27 ft)

Technical details
- Floor count: 53 aboveground
- Floor area: 120,800 m^{2} (1,300,000 sq ft)

Design and construction
- Architects: Arquitectonica; Recio + Casas Architects
- Developer: Metro Pacific Corporation; Bases Conversion Development Authority; Rufino family
- Structural engineer: Magnusson Klemencic Associates; Leslie E. Roberts Associates; Aromin & Sy + Associates
- Main contractor: EEI Corporation

The Pacific Plaza Towers are residential condominium skyscrapers located across One McKinley Place in Bonifacio Global City, Philippines. The twin 53-storey buildings, the North Tower and South Tower, were completed in 2001 and rose to 179 metres (587 feet) from the ground to their architectural top. They are currently the 20th and 21st-tallest buildings in the country and Metro Manila.

== History ==
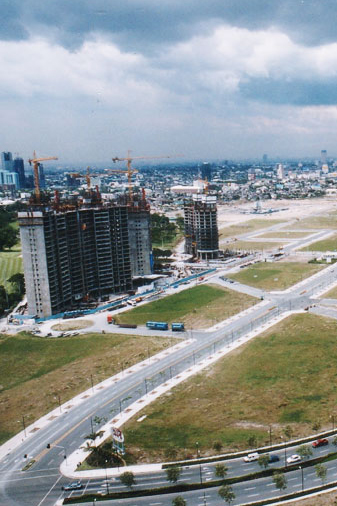
The Pacific Plaza towers under construction in February 1999

Pacific Plaza Towers began groundbreaking and excavation on February 14, 1997, with the first concrete pouring in 1998. It began to rise in January 1999; the South Tower was topped off in January 2000 and the North Tower two months later. It was completed in September 2000. It held its soft opening on February 22, 2001, and was inaugurated on March 9, 2001. Notable guests like Former President Corazon Aquino, then-BCDA chairman Rogelio Singson, then-Alaska Milk Corporation head Wilfred Uytengsu Sr. with his son Wilfred Jr. and his wife Kerri were invited to the inauguration. The complex took the record of being the tallest twin towers in the Philippines from Salcedo Park Twin Towers from 2001 to 2009, until The St. Francis Shangri-La Place was completed. From 1997-2001, Metro Pacific Corporation owned the site, then until 2006 jointly with Pacific Plaza Towers Condominium Corporation. After that period, MPC became Metro Pacific Investments Corporation and PPTCC became the sole legal entity that owned the estate.

== Gallery ==
The Towers seen from the northwest side

The Towers from the northeast side

Pacific Plaza Towers' west side as seen from EDSA-Ayala

Records
Preceded by Salcedo Park Twin Towers	Tallest Twin Towers in the Philippines; 2001—2009	Succeeded by The St. Francis Shangri-La Place
Preceded by none	Tallest building in Bonifacio Global City; 2001 – 2011	Succeeded by The Infinity Fort Bonifacio
