= Orient Square =

The Orient Square Building
- Interactive map of the The Orient Square Building area

General information
- Status: Completed
- Type: mixed use (Office, Residential)
- Location: F. Ortigas Jr. Avenue (Emerald Avenue), Ortigas Center, San Antonio, Pasig, Philippines
- Coordinates: 14.5853°N 121.0613°E
- Construction started: 1996
- Opening: 1999
- Owner: Daiichi Properties and Development
- Management: The Orient Square Condominium Asso., Inc.

Height
- Top floor: 160 m (520 ft)

Technical details
- Floor count: 38 aboveground, 7 belowground
- Lifts/elevators: 12

Design and construction
- Architect: R. Villarosa Architects
- Developer: Daiichi Properties and Development
- Structural engineer: R. Villarosa Architects
- Main contractor: Sota Glazing Incorporated, R.S. Caparros and Associates

The Orient Square (officially The Orient Square Building or Orient Square IT Center, acronym: OSB or use as a code: OS) is a first-class, high-rise building along Ortigas Center's main road, F. Ortigas Jr. Avenue (known as Emerald Avenue) in Pasig, Philippines. It rises 160 metres from ground level to roof, and is currently the 7th tallest complete building in Pasig, and the 76th tallest building in the Philippines. The building has 38 levels above ground, and 7 basement levels. It is a mixed-use building, both office and residential. Orient Square is one of the modern landmarks in Ortigas Center because of its architectural design and its one-of-a-kind curtain wall that glitters at night from the lights inside the building because of its transparency. The Philippine Economic Zone Authority (PEZA) declared it an Information Technology Building in January 2006.

The building has a 6-level concrete podium as its base, while its main body is fully clad with aluminium unitized curtain wall. It has a distinctive design of having multiple corners, especially on the top floors, making it easily recognizable among the buildings in Ortigas Center.

== Location ==
The building stands along F. Ortigas Jr. Avenue, formerly known as Emerald Avenue. At the back of the building is Ruby Road, and is within the Ortigas Center. It is located near other major office and residential buildings, hotels, bars, and restaurants in the area, as well as large shopping malls and other major landmarks.

== Amenities and features ==
=== Features ===
Its features include a fully unitized curtain wall, a computerized and comprehensive building and facility management, centralized cooling system with individual control, powerful communication facilities using fiber optics and digital technology and provision for LAN/DATA and efficient lift management. The building use as office, commercial and residential use.

=== Amenities ===
Its amenities include 7-level basements for vehicle parking, 12 high-speed elevators, including two below-ground elevators and one full-speed service lift, also has 6-level concrete podium as its base, helipad on the rooftop, skylounge and observatory near at the top, function rooms, main lobby, security gates, convenient store, food and bake shop, and banks. The building has also its own food court and restaurant area located at 6th floor.

== Major tenants ==
- Amihan Global Strategies (formerly known as Workforce Systems Inc.)
- Aventis Pharma
- Axis Global Interactive
- Banco de Oro
- BlastAsia Inc.
- China State Construction Engineering
- Citibank
- Cognitif Incorporated
- E-Pacific Contact Global Center
- Emerson Electric Company
- empleyado Incorporated
- Exclusive Networks - PH Inc.
- Exist Global Strategies Inc.
- GAITCON (Global Advanced IT Connections)
- Global Staff Connections
- Emapta
- ExxonMobil
- InfoComm Communications Network
- Inform Group
- InventAsia Limited
- Res Werkes Phils., Inc.
- Leverage Systems Technologies
- Neville Clarke Phils
- NexTel Communications
- Orchid CyberTech Services (TPG Telecom)
- Pan De Manila
- PIMS Company
- Prescribe Limited
- ResWerkes Phils., Inc.
- Sensomed Philippines, Inc.
- 7-Eleven
- Seven Seven Global Services Inc.
- SMEC International Pty Ltd
- Sodexho Pass Incorporated
- Standard Chartered Bank
- Sunlife of Canada
- TÜV SÜD Phils, Inc.
- VeriFone Global Development Phils.
- Vertiv
- Waveminds Global Solutions Limited Inc.

== See also ==
- List of tallest buildings in Metro Manila
