= Zuellig Building =

Office skyscraper in Makati, Philippines

- The Zuellig Building in 2017

General information
- Status: Completed
- Type: Office
- Location: Makati Avenue corner Paseo de Roxas, Makati, Philippines
- Coordinates: 14°33′28.22″N 121°1′35.76″E
- Construction started: 2009
- Completed: 2012
- Cost: ₱7 billion
- Owner: Zuellig Group
- Operator: CBRE (Leasing Agent)

Height
- Roof: 160 m (524.93 ft)

Technical details
- Floor count: 33 aboveground, 5 underground

Design and construction
- Architects: Skidmore, Owings and Merrill; W.V. Coscoluella & Associates
- Developer: Bridgebury Realty Corporation
- Structural engineer: Meinhardt Philippines
- Main contractor: Leighton Philippines

The Zuellig Building is an office skyscraper located in the Makati Central Business District in Metro Manila, Philippines, and is one of buildings taller than 150 m in the area. It is owned by the Zuellig Group and developed by its real estate arm, Bridgebury Realty Corp. It rises to 160 meters (520 ft), and was the first Platinum level LEED Core and Shell building in the Philippines upon its completion in 2013.

== Project team ==
Ground-level view of Zuellig Building in 2022

The Zuellig Building was designed by international architectural firm Skidmore, Owings and Merrill, in cooperation with local architectural firm W.V. Coscolluela & Associates. Facade design was done by Meinhardt Hong Kong Pte. Ltd., while Structural, Mechanical & Electrical, and Fire Protection engineering & design was provided by Meinhardt Philippines.

Other consultants of the project team are Davis Langdon & Seah Philippines Inc. (LEED Sustainability Consultant); E.A Aurelio Landscape Architects (Landscape Consultant); SBLD Studio (Lighting Consultant); Hill & Associates Risk Consulting (Philippines) Inc. (Security Consultant); and Sun Asia Industries (Traffic Consultant).

The general contractor is Leighton Contractors (Philippines). The project construction team also includes Permasteelisa (Curtain Wall Installation); Design Coordinates, Inc.(Construction Project Management); and Davis Langdon & Seah Philippines, Inc. (Quantity Surveying).

The Commissioning Authority (CxA) is Forsspac.233

== Awards ==
In December 2012, the Zuellig Building won the “People’s Choice” Award and a Bronze award for “Best in Office and Business Development” at the MIPIM Asia Awards. It was the only contender from the Philippines in awards.

== See also ==
- List of tallest buildings in Metro Manila
