= Shang Salcedo Place =

Residential building in Makati, Philippines

- Interactive map of the Shang Salcedo Place area

General information
- Status: Completed
- Type: Residential
- Location: Gil Puyat Avenue corner Tordesillas and H. V. Dela Costa Streets, Salcedo Village, Makati, Metro Manila, Philippines
- Coordinates: 14°33′42″N 121°01′14″E
- Construction started: 2012
- Completed: May 15, 2017
- Owner: Shang Properties, Inc.

Height
- Height: 249.80 m (819.6 ft)

Technical details
- Floor count: 67
- Floor area: 82,843 m^{2} (892,000 sq ft)
- Lifts/elevators: 3

Design and construction
- Architects: Pimentel Rodriguez Simbulan and Partners; Wong and Tung International Ltd.
- Developer: Shang Properties, Inc.
- Structural engineer: Sy^2+ Associates
- Main contractor: Megawide Construction Corporation

Shang Salcedo Place is a residential building situated in Makati, Metro Manila, Philippines. It is located along Sen. Gil Puyat Avenue, Tordesillas and H. V. de la Costa Streets.

== Location ==
The Shang Salcedo Place as seen from Buendia (Gil Puyat) Avenue in Makati

The tower is situated along Sen. Gil Puyat Avenue, located at the Makati Central Business District, and a few blocks away from the Ayala Avenue, the Salcedo Park, the Carlos P. Romulo Auditorium, the Yuchengco Museum, the FEU Makati campus, the Mapúa University Makati and the Ateneo de Manila University, Salcedo Campus.

== Architecture and design ==
Pimentel Rodriguez Simbulan and Partners were the architecture firm behind Shang Salcedo Place along with Wong and Tung International Ltd. Sy^2 + Associates was behind the structure of the building. J. P. Rapi (Philippines) Inc. was behind the MEP (mechanical, electrical, and plumbing) of the building. Megawide Construction Corporation was the main contractor of the building.

== See also ==
- List of tallest buildings in Metro Manila
