= Alveo Financial Tower =

Coordinates: 14°33′32″N 121°1′0″E

- Alveo Financial Tower as seen from Ayala Avenue.
- Interactive map of the Alveo Financial Tower area

General information
- Status: Completed
- Type: Office
- Location: 6794 Ayala Avenue, Makati, Philippines
- Construction started: 1996
- Completed: 2020
- Owner: JAKA Group of Companies (1990s–?); Enrile family (until 2014); Ayala Land Inc. (2014–present)

Height
- Roof: 188 m (616.80 ft)

Technical details
- Floor count: 49

Design and construction
- Architecture firm: Hellmuth, Obata and Kassabaum (under JAKA)
- Developer: JAKA Property Group (until 2014); Ayala Land (2014–present)

The Alveo Financial Tower, formerly known as the JAKA Tower, is an office skyscraper in Makati, Philippines. The construction of the tower formerly owned by the JAKA Group of the family of Senator Juan Ponce Enrile commenced in 1996 but was halted in 1998. In 2014, it was acquired by Ayala Land which later through its unit Alveo Land relaunched the tower as the Alveo Financial Tower in 2015.

== Construction ==
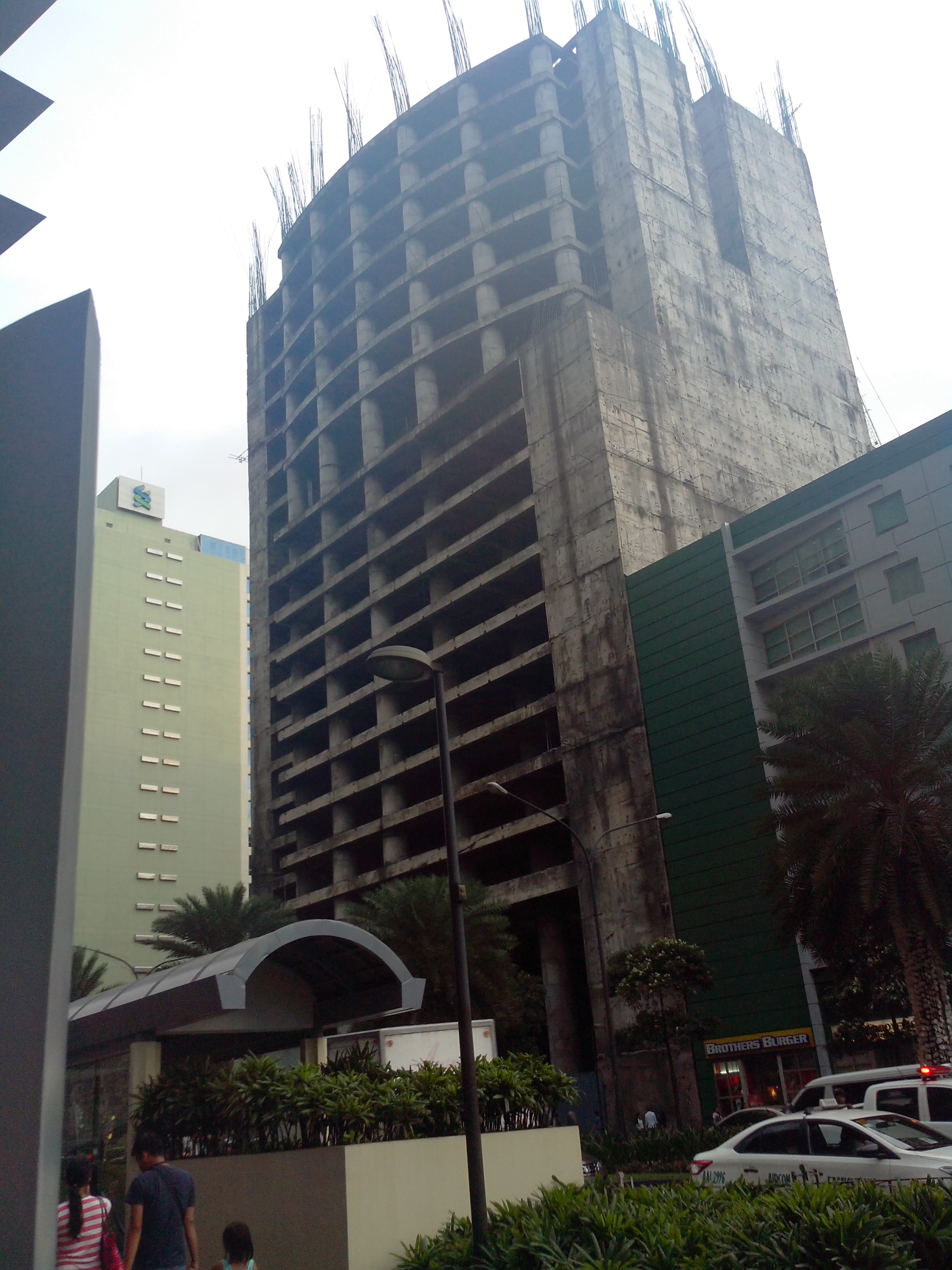
The tower as the JAKA Tower in 2015.

=== As the JAKA Tower ===
Alveo Financial Tower was originally named as the JAKA Tower. The tower's construction commenced in 1996 and was planned to be completed in 1999.

Construction was already in its 21st floor when the tower then named as the JAKA Tower was halted, due to the negative financial effects brought upon by the 1997 Asian financial crisis. The JAKA Group was forced to surrender its property to lenders. It was planned for works to resume in 2005 or 2006, but it did not push through. The only activity in the past 10 years was the application of protective coating on the exposed structural reinforcement bars of the building.

The building was designed by the architectural firm Hellmuth, Obata and Kassabaum, and was to be the first highrise project of Senator Juan Ponce Enrile's JAKA Property Group.

It was originally designed to rise 49 stories high, with a height of 185.9 meters (609.91 ft) to its roof. Its design was to have cladded finishing on its podium, and external curtain glass walls on the rest of the building. When finished, it was supposed to be one of the Philippines' tallest buildings at that time.

=== Acquisition by Ayala Land ===
In December 2012, Jack Enrile announced that his father, Juan Ponce Enrile has decided to sell the property due to lack of time and resources to finish the building. This is after Enrile's family bought back the property.

In September 2014, developer Ayala Land acquired the JAKA Tower, and planned to integrate the property in its City Gate development project. Ayala said that it would not demolish the existing building which is still structurally sound even after almost 15 years of abandonment. Ayala Land planned to commence the building's redevelopment sometime in 2015 and estimates the building's completion within three or four years. The company intends the JAKA Tower to be an office building. However, it also disclosed that the building may not be built to its originally intended height.

=== As the Alveo Financial Tower ===
On September 29, 2015, Ayala Land through its unit Alveo Land, relaunched the JAKA Tower as the Alveo Financial Tower. The building will still have 49 stories (48 floors with a roof deck). The Alveo Financial Tower will be an office building with plans for retail areas on its first three floors as well as a "business activity area" on the 5th and 17th floors. The tower will host 363 office units. It is reported that the office building will stand on a 2,400 square meters (26,000 sq ft) parcel of land and will have a gross floor area of 63,739 square meters (686,080 sq ft). The tower's turnover date is scheduled for 2020. Tupaz of the Alveo's Project Development Group said that they have "minimum disturbance plan" for the resumption of the tower's construction.

Alveo tasked foreign structural and civil engineering firm Magnusson Klemencic Associates and local engineering firm Sysquared + Associates to conduct a structural integrity assessment on the unfinished structure which took three months to complete. The two firms concluded that the building is structurally sound and suitable for use. Architectural firm William V. Coscolluela & Associates consulted on the original structure.

== See also ==
- List of tallest buildings in Metro Manila
