= Wack Wack Twin Towers =

- Interactive map of the Wack Wack Twin Towers area

General information
- Status: Completed
- Type: Residential
- Location: Wack Wack Road, Mandaluyong, Metro Manila, Philippines
- Coordinates: 14.5865°N 121.0488°E
- Completed: 1994

Height
- Height: 140 m (459.32 ft)

Technical details
- Floor count: 30

Design and construction
- Architects: W.V. Coscolluela and Associates

Wack Wack Twin Towers are twin residential towers situated in Mandaluyong, Metro Manila, Philippines. Both of its towers are 30-storeys high with a height of 140 m (459.32 ft).

The towers are set in a country park, developed on former grassland. The area is named after the local bird "uwak" (crow).

== See also ==
- List of tallest buildings in Metro Manila
