= Ramon Magsaysay Center =

18-storey building in Malate, Manila, Philippines

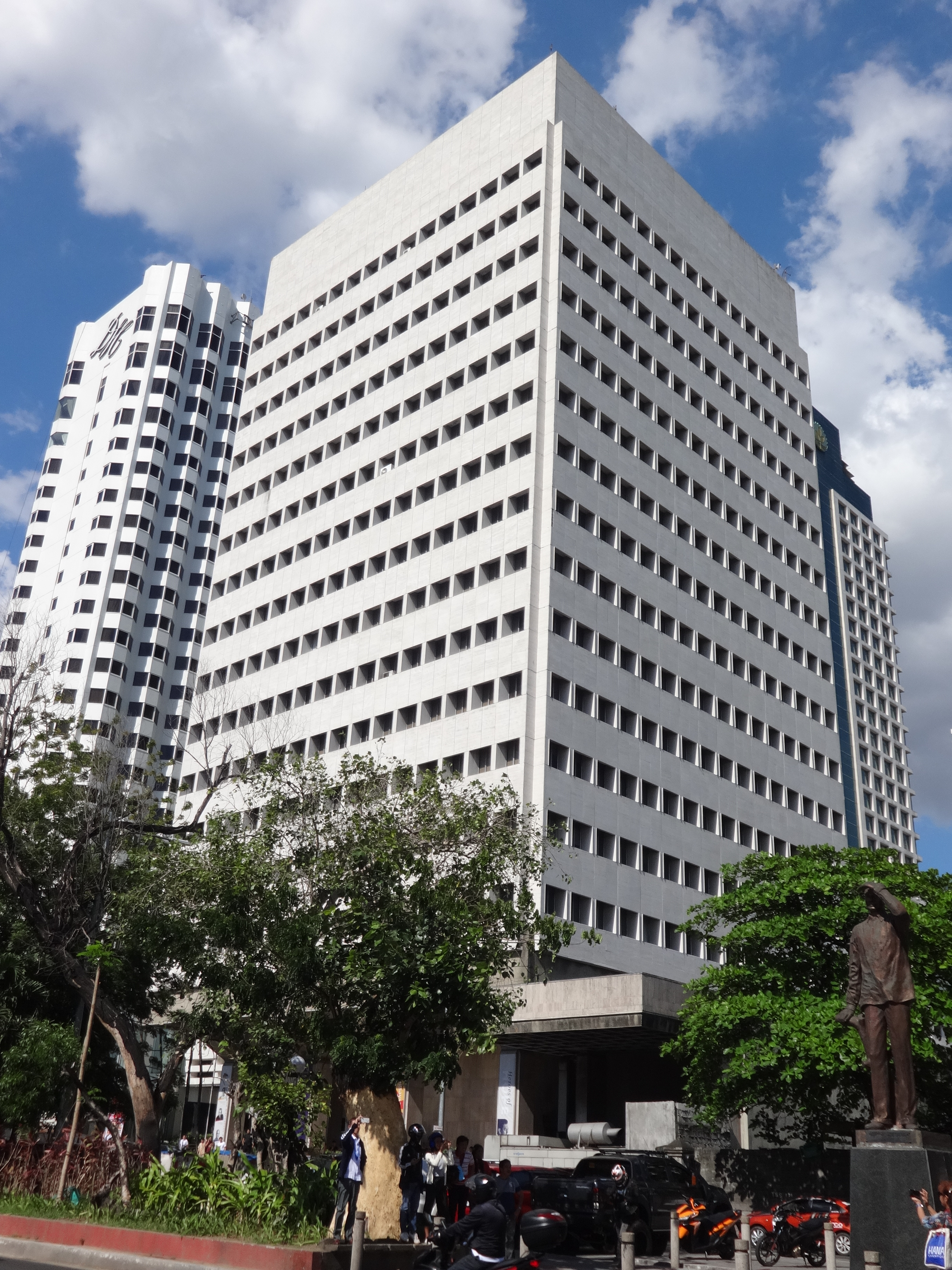
- Interactive map of the Ramon Magsaysay Center area
- Alternative names: RM Center

Record height
- Tallest in the Philippines from 1967 to 1968^{[I]}
- Preceded by: Manila Hotel
- Surpassed by: Manila Pavilion Hotel

General information
- Status: Completed
- Location: Roxas Boulevard corner Quintos Street, Malate, Manila, Philippines
- Coordinates: 14.5719°N 120.9822°E
- Named for: Ramon Magsaysay
- Completed: 1967

Technical details
- Floor count: 18

Design and construction
- Architect: Ruben Payumo
- Architecture firm: A.J. Luz Associates

The Ramon Magsaysay Center (abbreviated as RMC or RM Center) is an 18-storey building located at the corner of Roxas Boulevard and Quintos Street in Malate, Manila, Philippines.

It was built and opened in 1967 and was designed by Alfredo J. Luz and Associates, in consultation with Italian-American Pietro Belluschi and Alfred Yee Associates. It is named after Ramon Magsaysay, the 7th President of the Philippines who died in a plane crash in Cebu in 1957. It previously held the title as the tallest building in the Philippines from 1967 to 1968, before the completion of the Manila Pavilion Hotel.

== Architecture and design ==
Ruben Payumo of the Alfredo Luz's architectural firm was the project manager for the Ramon Magsaysay Center It is the first structure in the country to sport column-free structural concept. The design used pre-cast and pre-stressed beams like a tree rooted on the ground. The exterior of the building was designed to withstand the salty environment that surrounds the building. It was clad with travertine marble slabs embedded in the frame of the building.

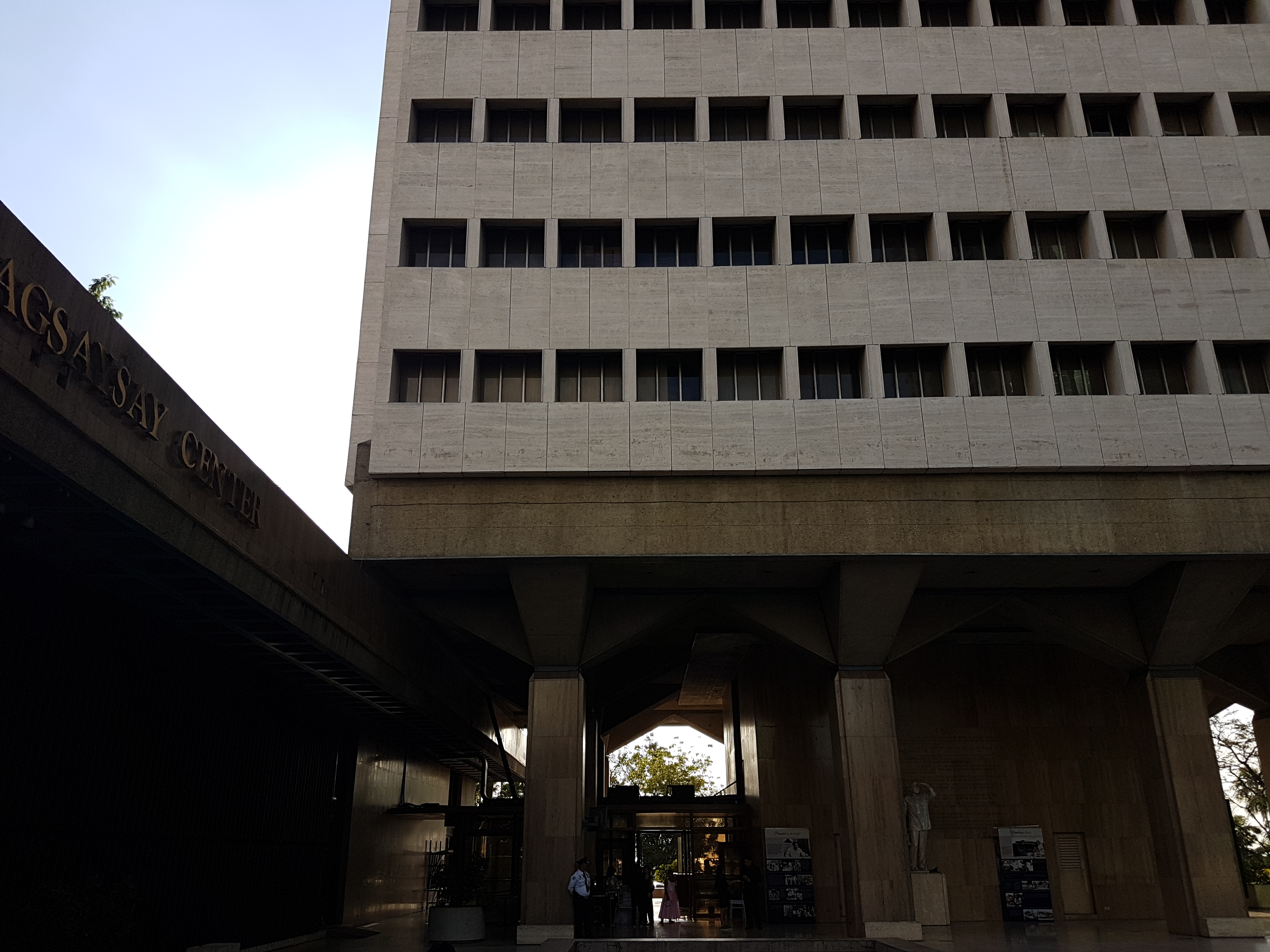
Ground level showing the base of the building

== See also ==
- List of tallest buildings in Metro Manila
