= 8 Wack Wack Road =

- Interactive map of the 8 Wack Wack Road area

General information
- Status: Completed
- Type: Residential
- Location: 8 Wack Wack Road, Mandaluyong, Metro Manila, Philippines
- Coordinates: 14.5864°N 121.0499°E
- Completed: 2000
- Management: H&D Facilities Management Team

Height
- Height: 147.14 m (482.74 ft)

Technical details
- Floor count: 42
- Lifts/elevators: 4

Design and construction
- Architect: Recio+Casas Architects
- Developer: Megaworld Corporation

8 Wack Wack Road is a 42-story residential skyscraper in Mandaluyong, Metro Manila, Philippines. The building has a height of 147.14 m (482.74 ft). It is located in Brgy. Wack Wack. The building was completed in the year 2000 from the architectural company Recio+Casas.

== Building ==
=== Functionality ===
The residence has a pool, a country club and a golfing place, multiple rooms, and a lobby featuring a marble flooring and several paintings. The residence has 24-hour security, air-conditioning, and lobby receptionists. The two-bedroom units have a bathroom, and a view of the Makati skyline. The master bedroom albeit has the same things, but with a closet. The building also has lounge areas, a children's playground, function rooms, and a gymnasium.

== See also ==
- List of tallest buildings in Metro Manila
