= The World Centre =

- The World Centre as seen from Buendia Avenue in Makati.
- Interactive map of the The World Centre area

General information
- Status: Completed
- Type: Office
- Location: 330 Gil Puyat Avenue, Salcedo Village, Makati, Philippines
- Coordinates: 14°33′42″N 121°01′16″E
- Construction started: 1994
- Opening: November 1996
- Owner: Megaworld Properties & Holdings, Inc.
- Operator: Megaworld Land Inc.

Height
- Antenna spire: 152.4 m (500.00 ft)

Technical details
- Floor count: 30 aboveground, 5 belowground
- Lifts/elevators: 7 passenger, 1 service

Design and construction
- Architects: Skidmore, Owings and Merrill; W.V. Coscoluella & Associates
- Developer: Megaworld Corp.
- Structural engineer: Ove Arup & Partners

The World Centre is an office skyscraper located in Makati, Philippines. It is owned by Megaworld Corp. It stands at 152.4 metres (500 feet), and is located on the largest central business district of the country.

== Design ==
The World Centre building was designed and planned by Filipino architectural firm W.V. Coscolluela & Associates, in cooperation with international architectural firm Skidmore, Owings and Merrill. Structural engineering consultancy work was done by Ove Arup and Partners. The building's exterior is clad with glossy curtain walls, and has a spire for communications and transmission. The building also has a helicopter deck area at the roof deck.

== Occupants ==
The World Centre houses the Embassy of China's consular section and military attaché office.

== See also ==
- List of tallest buildings in Metro Manila
