= Mandarin Square =

Residential building in Manila, Philippines

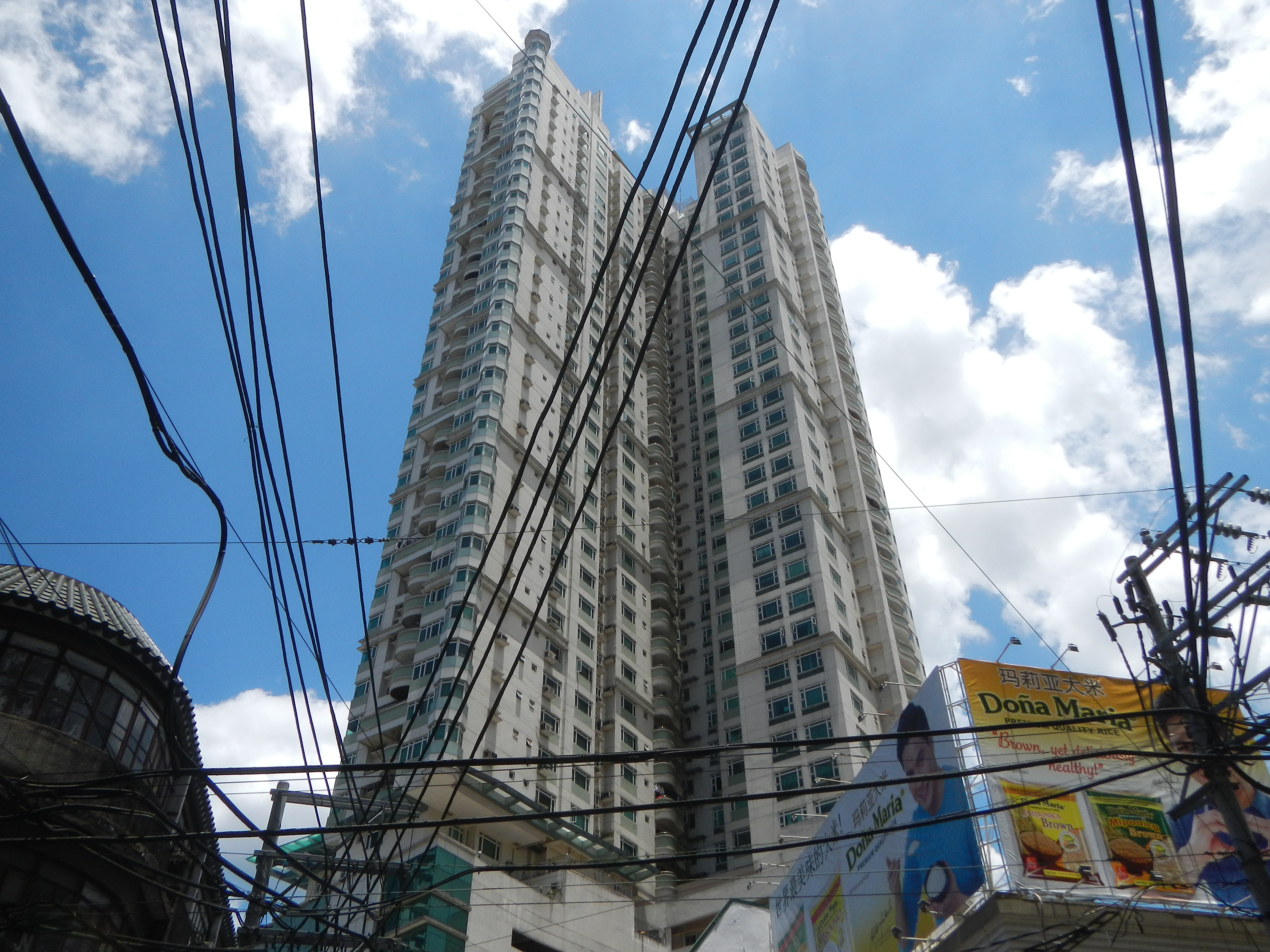
- Interactive map of the Mandarin Square area

General information
- Status: Completed
- Location: 777 Ongpin Street, Binondo, Manila, Philippines
- Coordinates: 14°36′07″N 120°58′36″E
- Completed: 2010

Height
- Height: 149 m (488.85 ft)

Technical details
- Floor count: 39

Design and construction
- Developer: Anchor Land Holdings Inc.

The Mandarin Square is a 39-storey residential skyscraper at the Binondo district in Manila, Philippines. The building has a height of 149 m (488.85 ft) and built on a 2,350 square meters lot.

The building was the second residential tower that was developed by Anchor Land Holdings in Binondo district (the first was the Lee Tower). It was constructed by EEI Corporation.
