= The Shang Grand Tower =

Skyscraper in Makati, Philippines

- The Shang Grand Tower as seen from Ayala Triangle Gardens.
- Interactive map of the The Shang Grand Tower area

General information
- Status: Completed
- Type: Residential
- Architectural style: Post Modernist-Art-Deco architecture
- Location: Perea Street corner De la Rosa Street, Legaspi Village, Makati, Philippines
- Coordinates: 14°33′16.96″N 121°1′17.67″E
- Construction started: 2003
- Completed: November 2005
- Opening: March 8, 2006
- Cost: Php 2,000,000,000
- Owner: The Shang Grand Tower Condominium Corporation
- Management: The Shang Grand Tower Condominium Corporation

Height
- Roof: 180 m (590.55 ft)

Technical details
- Floor count: 46 aboveground, 4 belowground
- Floor area: 71,316 m^{2} (768,000 sq ft)
- Lifts/elevators: 7

Design and construction
- Architects: Palmer & Turner (P & T) Architects and Engineers Ltd.; Recio + Casas Architects
- Developer: EDSA Property Holdings, Inc.
- Structural engineer: Ove Arup Philippines
- Main contractor: D.M. Consunji, Inc.

The Shang Grand Tower, also known as simply the Shang Tower, is a high-end residential condominium skyscraper located in Makati, Philippines. It was developed by Shang Properties, Inc. The 46-story building was opened in 2006 and rises to 180 metres (630 feet) from the ground to its architectural top. It is currently the 10th-tallest complete building in Makati, and is the 19th-tallest building in the country and Metro Manila as well. The 250-unit condominium was the first self-funded residential condominium of Shangri-La Hotels and Resorts’ Kuok Group in the country, and all units were sold-out as of 2006.

== Construction and design ==
The Shang Grand Tower was designed by international architectural firm Palmer & Turner (P & T) Architects and Engineers Ltd., in cooperation with local architectural firm Recio + Casas Architects; while the structural design was provided by engineering company Ove Arup Philippines, the local branch of international engineering firm Arup. Project and construction management works were provided by Jose Aliling & Associates, and the general contractor was D.M. Consunji, Inc.

International landscape consultants Belt Collins were responsible for its outdoor panoramic designs, while “designers to the hotel and resort industry,” Hospitality and Leisure Asia set the tone for its general interiors.

The Shang Grand Tower construction began in September 2003, a period in which the Philippines was recovering from the effects of the 1997 Asian financial crisis. Structural work was done at a rate of 1 floor per week, and was topped-off in March 2005. The building was formally completed in November 2005, and was formally opened to the public on March 8, 2006

== Design ==
The building stands on a nearly 2,900 sq.m. of land, and roughly 71,000 sq.m. of floor space takes the shape of the letter “Z” with a straight line in the middle. This enables unit owners at the extreme ends of “Z” to have three views of the outside.

The exterior has a post-modern with traditional art deco design with verdant tinted glass. The entrance lobbies have marble and granite finishes, and are divided into low zone (from 6th to 26th floor) and high zone (from 27th floor up to the penthouse). Each zone consists of three passenger lifts and one common service lift.

Residential units have floors in “engineered wood” Pergo flooring; tiles from Hong Kong; imported granite kitchen countertop; main doors in solid wood and veneered on the surface; picture windows in blue-green tempered glass in powder-coated aluminum frames; underground and overhead water tanks, a standby generator to supply 75 percent of the building's power needst. Main doors have one side that have a narrow extra door which opens to allow entry or exit of big items for the homes.

The building is purely residential in nature, with no commercial or office space, no bridgeways or walkways to connect it to any commercial and office establishment.

== See also ==
- List of tallest buildings in Metro Manila
