= DDT Sky Tower =

Office tower in Quezon City, Philippines

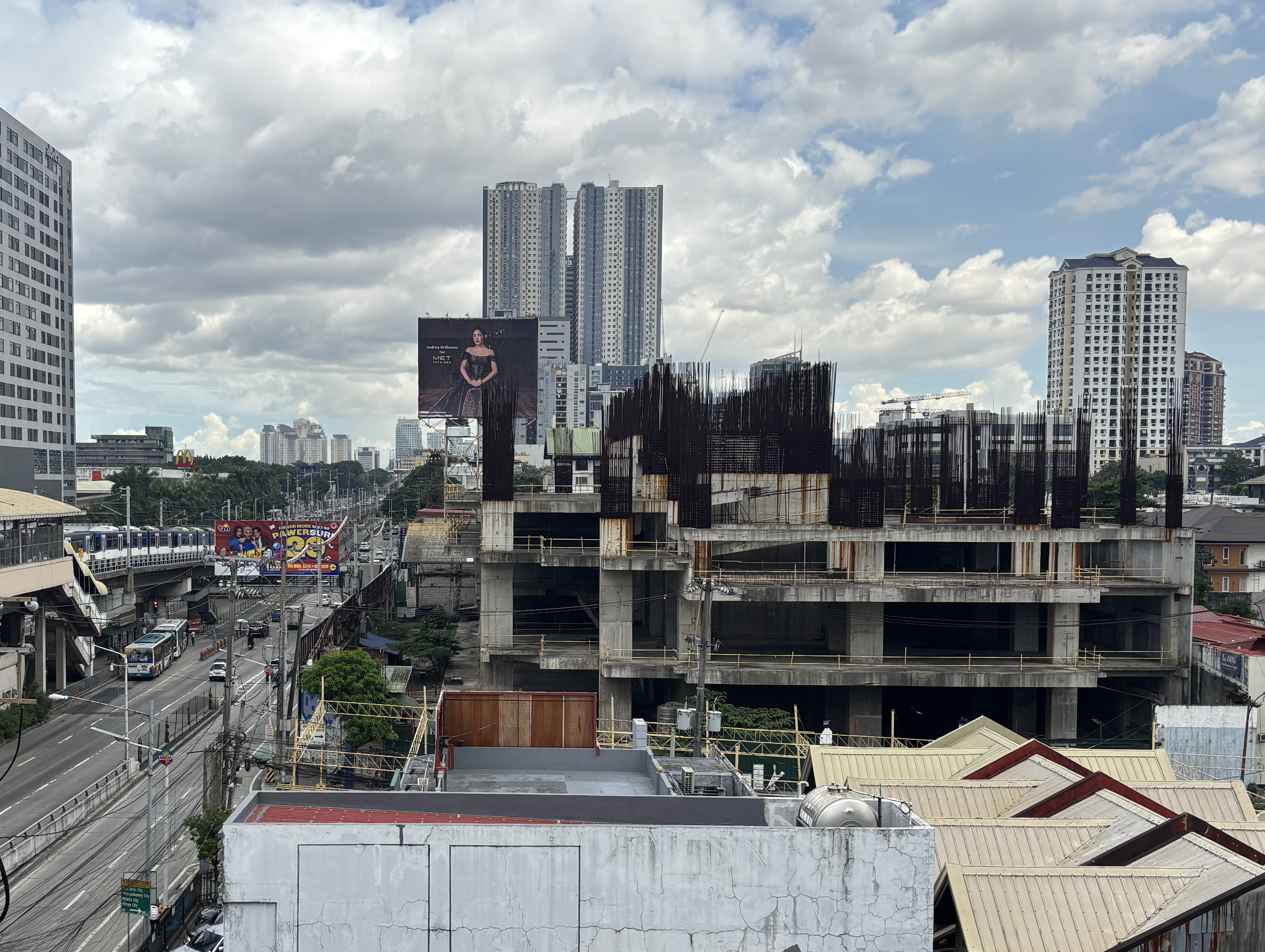
- Construction progress as of August 2025
- Interactive map of the DDT Sky Tower area

General information
- Status: On hold
- Type: office, residential
- Location: Epifanio De los Santos Avenue, Quezon City, Philippines
- Coordinates: 14°38′29″N 121°02′19″E
- Groundbreaking: June 2019
- Construction started: 2019
- Estimated completion: ?

Height
- Tip: 300.1 m (985 ft)
- Roof: 280 m (920 ft)

Technical details
- Floor count: 65
- Lifts/elevators: 27
- Grounds: 5,000 square meters (54,000 sq ft)

Design and construction
- Architects: Aidea, Inc.
- Developer: DataLand, Inc.
- Main contractor: DDT Konstract, Inc.

Other information
- Parking: 1,434 slots (including 312 underground)

Website
- www.ddtskytower.ph

The DDT Sky Tower is an unfinished mixed-use skyscraper in Quezon City, Metro Manila, Philippines.

== Background ==
The DDT Sky Tower is a project of DataLand Inc. and is the first project of the company under its office spaces arm, DataLand Offices. The 60-storey building was planned stand on a 5,000 m^{2} (54,000 sq ft) land and would have a total leasable office space of 115,000 m^{2} (1,240,000 sq ft), reportedly the biggest in the Philippine office space industry as of mid-2019. The office spaces of the building would be divided into three zones: Low zone (16th to 27th floors), mid zone (28th zone) and high zone (43rd to 57th floors). Parking spaces are allocated to the building's 3rd to 13th floors and three basement levels with 1,122 parking slots above ground and 312 parking slots underground. The first two floors are allotted for retail space and the 14th floor will host a food court for the employees of the building's tenants. The building has accreditation from the Philippine Economic Zone Authority and LEED certification is being aspired for the building.

In 2022, DataLand Inc. reported a change in the plans for the building. The DDT Sky Tower was renamed as 947 Sky Towers a two-tower mixed-use development in a 5,250 square meters (56,500 sq ft) lot. The first and second towers would have 54 and 55 floors respectively and three basement parking sites and three podium parking facilities. The development, which was reported to be worth ₱11,000,000,000, would be used for residence and office spaces, would be launched in March 2023.

== Delay ==
In 2022, construction of the DDT Sky Tower was delayed, as it stayed on the 2nd or 3rd floor for many months. It was confirmed that it will become a mixed-use development, called the 947 Sky Towers, to be launched in 2023.
