= The Infinity Fort Bonifacio =

Mixed-use skyscraper in Taguig, Philippines

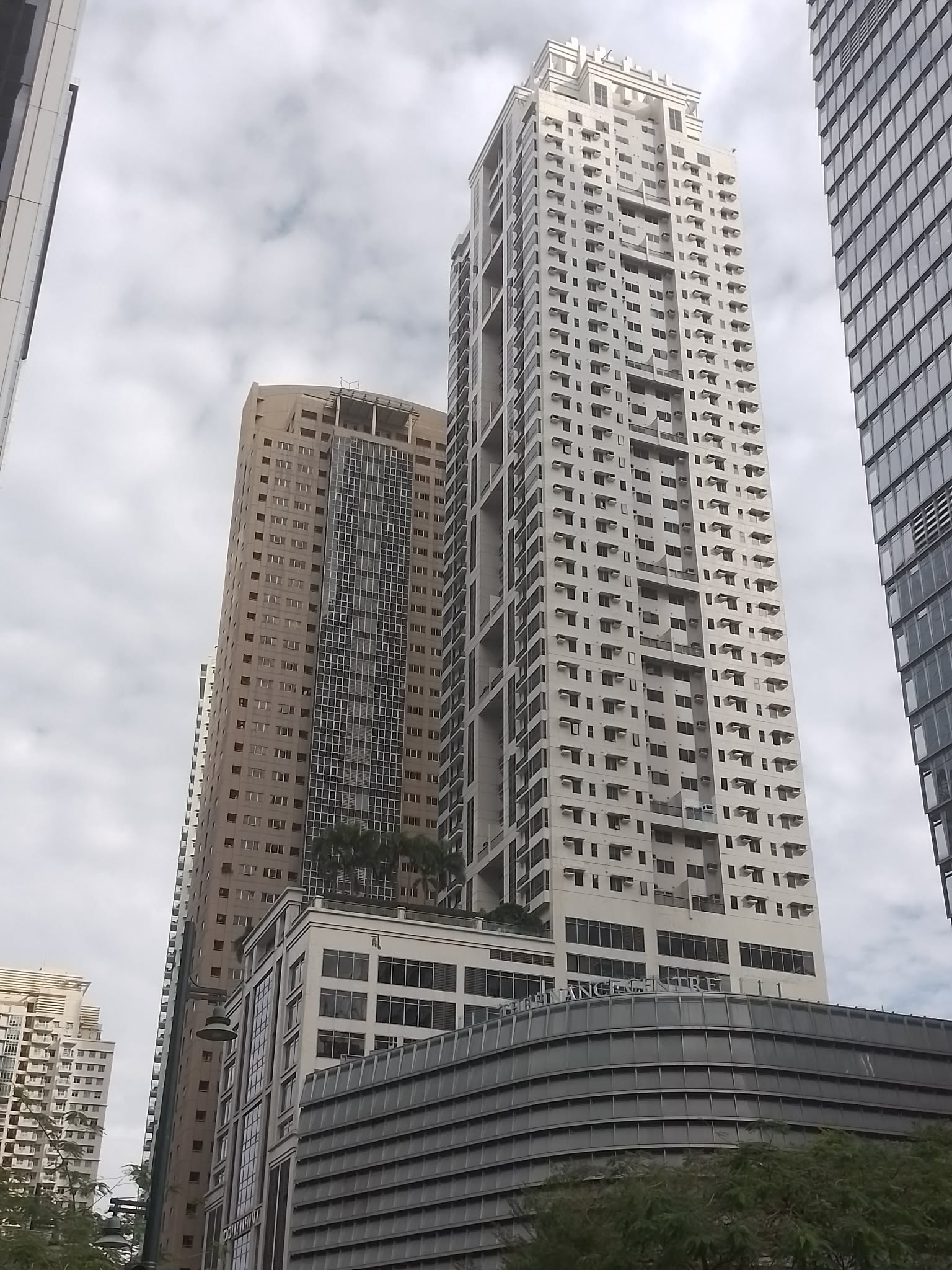
- Interactive map of the The Infinity Fort Bonifacio area

General information
- Status: Completed
- Type: Mixed-use
- Location: 26th Street, Fort Bonifacio Global City, Taguig City, Metro Manila, Philippines
- Coordinates: 14°32′50″N 121°03′05″E
- Construction started: 19 November 2007
- Completed: 2013
- Owner: Nuvoland Philippines Inc.

Height
- Roof: 189.8 m (622.70 ft)

Technical details
- Floor count: 48 aboveground
- Lifts/elevators: 6

Design and construction
- Architect: Joy Manimtim
- Developer: Nuvoland Philippines Inc.
- Main contractor: China State Construction Engineering Corp.

The Infinity Fort Bonifacio is a mixed-use skyscraper in Bonifacio Global City, Taguig, Metro Manila, Philippines. Although no exact height details was disclosed, it is found to have a height of 189.8 metres (622.70 feet), and has 48 floors above ground level.

The Infinity Fort Bonifacio was designed by Abigail Pangilinan of Recio + Casas Architects, while the project construction management is handled by S.P. Castro Inc. The building was constructed by China State Construction Engineering Corp.

== See also ==
- List of tallest buildings in Metro Manila
