= Anchor Skysuites =

Residential skyscraper in Manila

- The Anchor Skysuites in 2019
- Interactive map of the Anchor Skysuites area

General information
- Status: Completed
- Architectural style: Organicism
- Location: Binondo, 827 Ongpin Street, Manila, Philippines
- Coordinates: 14.6020115°N 120.9777767°E
- Construction started: 2011
- Topped-out: December 1, 2012
- Completed: 2015

Height
- Architectural: 190.55 m (625.16 ft)
- Top floor: 181.25 m (594.65 ft)

Technical details
- Material: Concrete
- Floor count: 53 (plus 1 underground)
- Floor area: 79,167 square metres (852,150 sq ft)
- Lifts/elevators: 6

Design and construction
- Architect: Albert Yu
- Architecture firm: Asya Design Partner
- Developer: Anchor Land Holdings
- Structural engineer: SY^{2} + Associates; AIT-Consulting
- Main contractor: AC Technical Servicesc; AMASI; EEI Corporation; FDPY Pipe Specialist Co.

Other information
- Number of units: 346
- Parking: 484

Website
- www.anchorskysuites.com

The Anchor Skysuites is a residential skyscraper at the Binondo district in Manila, Philippines.

== Construction ==
The building had its launching in February 2011. The topped-off ceremony for the building took place on December 1, 2014.

== Architecture and design ==
Street-level view of Anchor Skysuites

Albert Yu of Asya Design Partner was responsible for the architectural design of the Anchor Skysuites. The design of the building was derived from organic architecture. Its biomorphic form is designed to utilize air and sunlight to reduce the energy consumption of the building. The windows were provided by German firm, Lemmens.

For the structural engineering of the Binondo skyscraper, Jose "Boy" Sy and Naveed Anwar of the Asian Institute of Technology were responsible. The Anchor Skysuites was also evaluated to have high earthquake resistance. The façade of the building was painted waterproof paints from UKUSA which were imported from the United Kingdom.

The building's architectural height is 190.55 metres (625.2 ft) while its highest floor that can be occupied is at 181.25 metres (594.7 ft) making it the tallest building in Manila Chinatown and is claimed by its developers to be the tallest building in the world situated within a Chinatown outside China. There are 56 designated floors for the building with the 13th, 14th, 34th, 44th, and 54th floors skipped and the ground, mezzanine and 1st floors being three separate floors. Thus the building which also has a single basement level has 53 physical floors above ground.

The units of the residential building is also oriented towards the southern direction a decision guided by Feng shui tradition.

== Features ==
The Anchor Skysuites as a residential condominium have 346 units. Among its amenities are a basketball half-court, a full badminton court, a table tennis room, a billiards room, a gymnasium, a 25 metres (82 ft) lap swimming pool and children's pool, a garden lounge and café, bar, golfer's rest area, mini-theater, a dance studio, and karaoke rooms,
