= One Shangri-La Place =

Twin tower in the Philippines

- The towers in 2022

General information
- Status: Completed
- Type: Residential
- Location: Epifanio de los Santos Avenue, Ortigas Center, Mandaluyong, Metro Manila, Philippines
- Coordinates: 14.5821°N 121.0558°E
- Completed: 2014
- Owner: Shang Properties, Inc.

Height
- Height: 227 m (745 ft)

Technical details
- Floor count: 64
- Grounds: 9,852 m^{2} (106,050 sq ft)

Design and construction
- Architects: Casas + Architects; Palmer & Turner, HK (Consultant)
- Developer: Shang Properties, Inc.
- Structural engineer: Sy^2 + Associates

Other information
- Number of units: 1,304

One Shangri-La Place is a residential development with twin residential towers situated in Mandaluyong, Metro Manila, Philippines. Both of its towers are 64-storeys high with a height of 227 meters (745 ft), making them the tallest twin towers in the Philippines. The building's podium also hosts a wing of the Shangri-La Plaza mall, which opened in 2013.

== Architecture and design ==
Casas + Architects was the architecture firm behind One Shangri-La Place along with Hong Kong–based Palmer & Turner which served as architecture consultants. Hong Kong firms BTR Workshop Ltd. and Adrian L. Norman Ltd. were also involved with the former responsible for the retail and interior design and the latter for the Landscaping. Sy^2 + Associates were behind the buildings' superstructure while Aecom were behind their substructure. Meinhardt Phils was behind the MEPF (mechanical, electrical, plumbing and fire protection) of the buildings. Worktect worked with the lighting and Graphia for the signage designs.

Street-level view of One Shangri-La Place

The towers, the North and South Towers are 64-storeys above ground. A total of 14 high-speed passenger and service elevators are installed in the tower complex.
