= The Finance Centre =

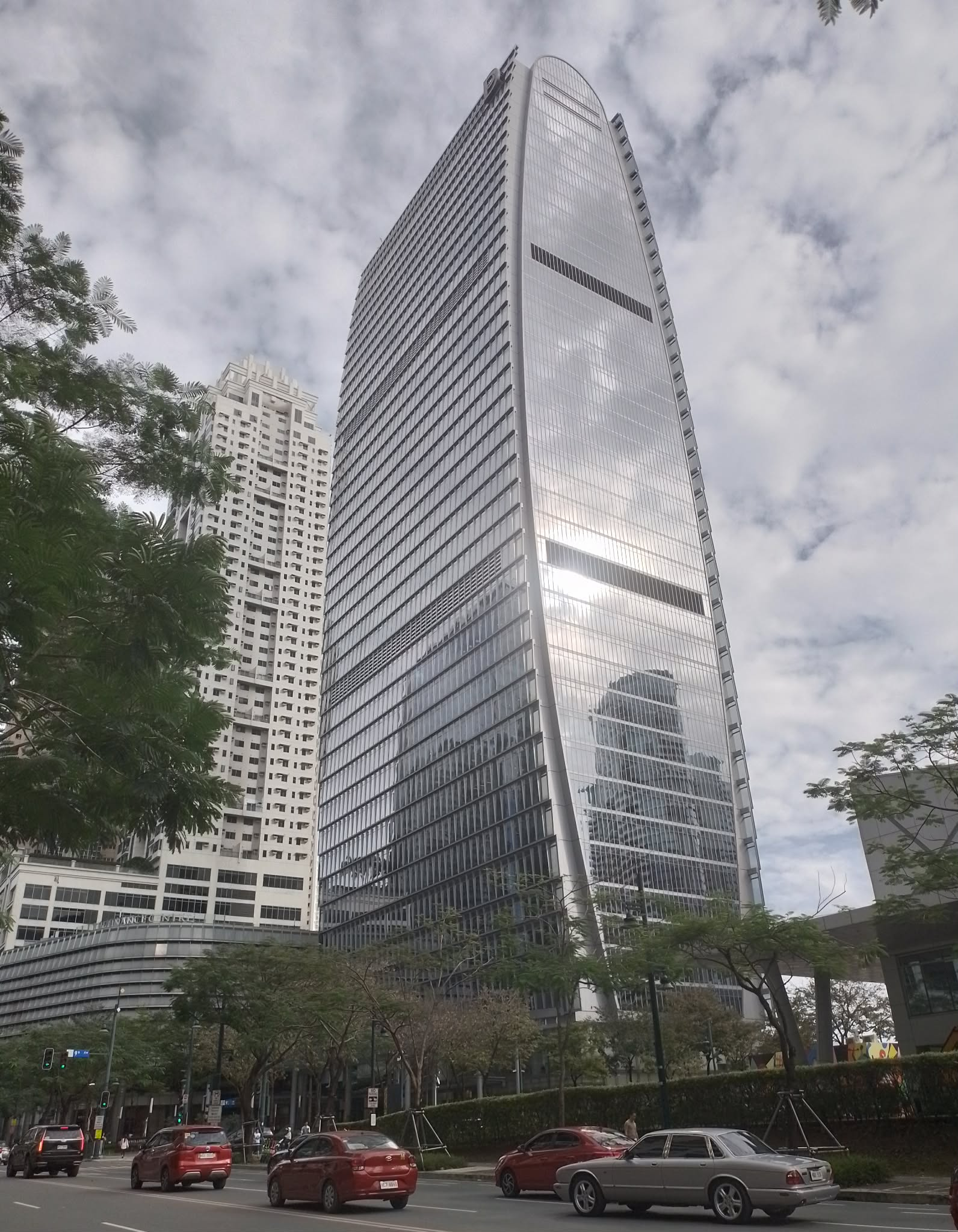

General information
- Status: Completed
- Architectural style: Neofuturism
- Location: 9th Avenue corner 26th Street, Bonifacio Global City
- Construction started: June 5, 2014
- Completed: 2018

Technical details
- Floor count: 42
- Floor area: 1,700 sqm (18,000 sq ft)

Design and construction
- Architects: Gensler, Aidea
- Developer: Daiichi Properties and Development, Inc.

The Finance Centre is a skyscraper in Bonifacio Global City, Metro Manila, Philippines. The building's architectural and interior design is a collaboration of GENSLER and AIDEA and was developed by Daiichi Properties & Development, Inc. The office building broke ground on June 5, 2014 and is the landmark building for Daiichi Properties. It is one of few buildings in the Philippines with LEED Gold rating.

The topping-off ceremonies were held in May 2017 and was completed in 2018.

== Design ==
The Finance Centre has a fully unitized curtain wall made of combined insulated high performance glass and aluminum composite panels. It has an enhanced structural design to resist earthquakes. The tower has 42 floors where 31 floors are dedicated for office spaces. Its form and layout is designed to provide flexibility for various planning needs of future tenants. The Finance Centre was designed by Gensler.

The building contains a 1,700-square-metre (18,000 ft^{2}) plaza with water features and a sky garden above its retail podium.

== Location ==
The Finance Centre is located at 26th Street corner 9th Ave., in the southern part of Bonifacio Global City, and is within the vicinity of Serendra, Bonifacio High Street, Market! Market!, and SM Aura.
