= Tower 6789 =

Skyscraper in Makati, Philippines

- Tower 6789 in 2022.
- Interactive map of the Tower 6789 area

General information
- Status: Completed
- Location: 6789 Ayala Avenue, Makati, Metro Manila, Philippines
- Coordinates: 14°33′29″N 121°01′12″E
- Completed: 2013

Height
- Roof: 180 m (590.55 ft)

Technical details
- Floor count: 35
- Floor area: 48,000 m^{2} (517,000 sq ft)

Tower 6789, also known as Makati Tower (formerly named Alphaland Makati Tower), is a commercial skyscraper in Barangay Bel-Air, Makati, Metro Manila, Philippines. With a height of 180 meters (590.551 feet) and 35 floors, Tower 6789 is also the 11th tallest building in the country's financial district, closely following RCBC Plaza Yuchengco Tower. It has a gross leasable area of 26,582 square meters with a floor template between 1,100 and 1600 sqms. The tower was owned by local developer Alphaland, a joint venture between London-based private equity fund Ashmore Group and RVO Capital Ventures of former Trade Minister Roberto V. Ongpin, but was already transferred to give Ashmore 100 percent ownership.

Designed by Wong & Ouyang, the tower employs the glass design concept, featuring a lobby that's entirely clad in glass to admit natural light. It also includes features for improved energy performance, indoor air quality, and efficiency in water consumption. Tower 6789 currently holds a LEED pre-certified Gold rating for Core and Shell construction based on its structure, building envelope, and HVAC system. The project was inaugurated in June 2013.

== Design and features ==
Tower 6789 is created to allow future tenants to maintain lower operating costs and reduce carbon footprint. Its low-flow plumbing fixtures provides 20% savings on water consumption. It also has state-of-the-art conference centers, meeting rooms, and dining facilities, as well as fiber optic cabling.

== Location ==
The building is built along 6789 Ayala Avenue, one of the busiest streets in Makati. It is on the same block as PBCom Tower, the tallest building in the area. Other nearby buildings are Robinsons Summit Center, Insular Life, 6780 Ayala Bldg., and Bank of the Philippine Islands (BPI) Head Office.

== Name ==
Alphaland Makati Tower was renamed to Makati Tower as its ownership has been transferred to the Ashmore group: Alphaland Holdings (Singapore) Pte Ltd. (AH) and Masrickstar Corporation. As of 2016, the building is called simply Tower 6789.
