= Skycity (Mandaluyong) =

Skyscraper in Mandaluyong, Philippines

- Interactive map of the Skycity area

General information
- Status: Never built (Excavation only)
- Type: Mixed-use
- Location: Ortigas Avenue, corner EDSA, Mandaluyong, Metro Manila, Philippines
- Coordinates: 14°35′38.98″N 121°03′29.49″E
- Construction started: 1997

Height
- Antenna spire: 335 m (1,099 ft)

Technical details
- Structural system: Steel frame
- Floor count: 77
- Grounds: 4,109 m^{2} (44,230 sq ft)

Design and construction
- Developer: E. Ganzon Inc. (EGI); Sam Buena Realty Corporation

Skycity is an unbuilt 77-storey supertall skyscraper in an intersection corner of Ortigas Avenue and EDSA in Mandaluyong, Metro Manila, Philippines.

The site of the proposed building was excavated in 1997 but construction was halted due to the opposition of residents of the nearby Greenhills East Village.

Planned to rise 335 m (1,099 ft), it would have been among the tallest buildings in the world if completed within schedule. No vertical construction has occurred despite the Supreme Court ruling in favor of its developers in 2010.

== History ==
=== Excavation work (1997) ===
The lot where Skycity proposed to be built had a Tropical Hut restaurant and supermarket outlet, a bank, some parking spaces and a telecom tower.

E. Ganzon Inc. began work on Skycity around 1997, fencing the site in Ortigas, demolishing existing buildings, and starting excavation. The lot is owned by San Buena Realty and Development Corporation.

=== Opposition by the Greenhills East Association (1998–2010) ===
Construction was halted due to a lawsuit filed by the Greenhills East Association Inc. (GEA), the homeowners' association from nearby upscale Greenhills East Village on the following year. Their objections included concerns over residents’ privacy, potential effects on the village’s water supply, and the shadow the proposed tower would cast on nearby homes, among other issues.

The GEA in 1998 wrote to the Housing and Land Use Regulatory Board (HLURB) to oppose the project. In November 1999, the HLRUB dismissed the GEA's opposition. The GEA made a failed appeal to the Office of the President before elevating the case to the Court of Appeals which ruled against them in 2004.

In 2010, the Second Division of the Philippine Supreme Court rejected the GEA's challenges, deferring to the expertise of HLURB. EGI then stated that it could resume construction.

=== Aftermath ===
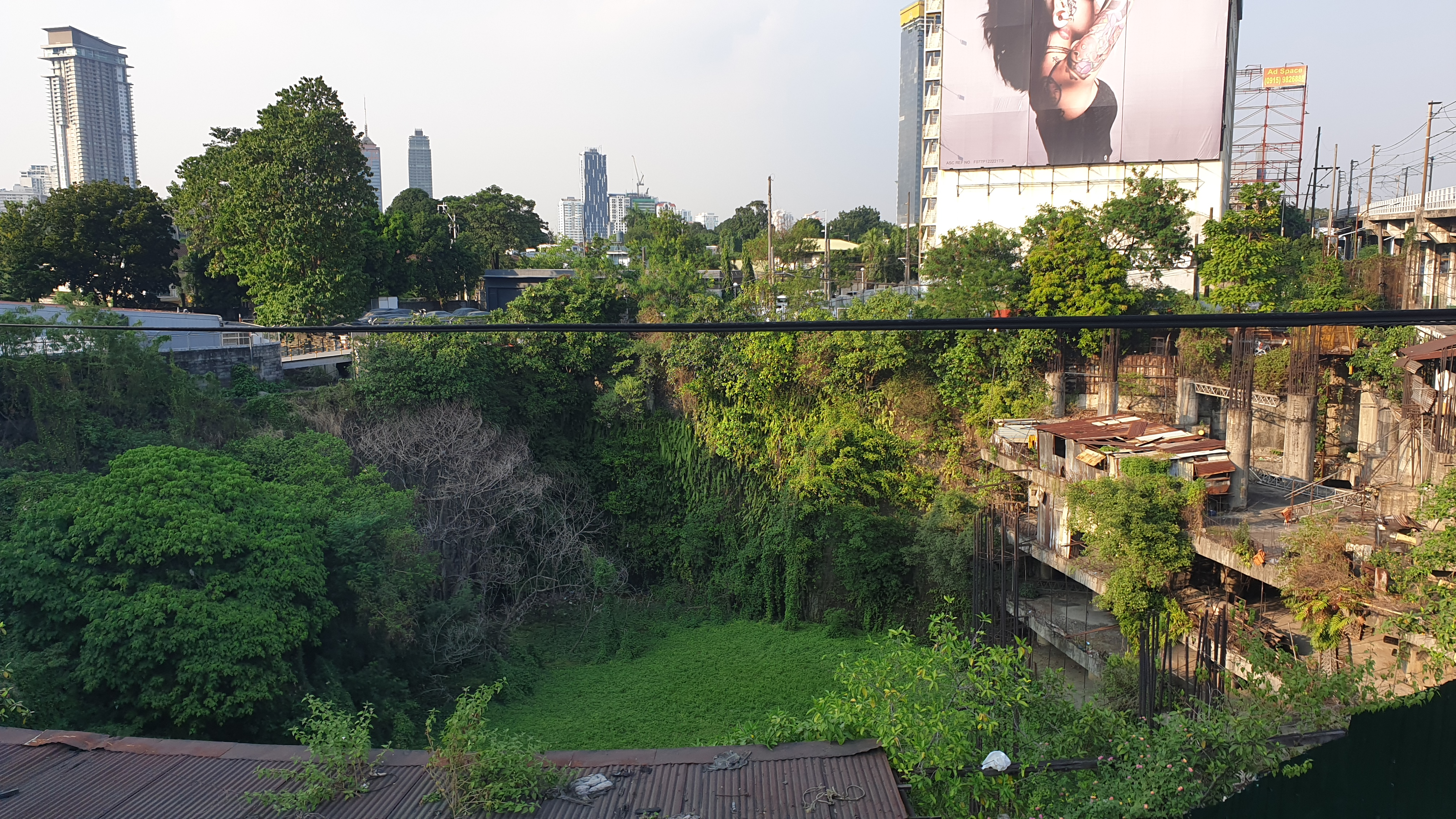
The excavation site where Skycity was supposed to be built. c. 2022.

The excavation area as of 2020, now commonly referred to as the "big hole" is filled with moss with no visible signs of resumption of construction.

== Architecture and design ==
Had Skycity been built as planned in the early 2000s, it was projected to have been the tallest in the Philippines and among the tallest buildings in the world. Skycity was planned to be a 335-meter (1,099 ft) skyscraper with 77-storeys above ground and eight levels of basement. The lot the building would have built on measures 4,109 square meters (44,230 sq ft) The building would have build using steel framing over the traditional beams-columns-slabs building system.

It is a joint venture between real estate developer E. Ganzon Inc. (EGI) and Sam Buena Realty Corporation.

== See also ==
- List of tallest buildings in Metro Manila
- NIMBY
