= Salcedo Park Twin Towers =

The Salcedo Park Condominium are residential condominium skyscrapers in Makati, Philippines.

Records
Preceded by Ritz Tower	Tallest Twin Towers in the Philippines; 1996—2001	Succeeded by Pacific Plaza Towers
