= The Stratford Residences =

Mixed-use skyscraper in Makati, Philippines

- Computer rendering of The Stratford Residences.
- Interactive map of the The Stratford Residences area

General information
- Status: Under construction
- Type: Mixed-use
- Location: Picar Place, Kalayaan Avenue, Poblacion, Makati, Metro Manila, Philippines
- Coordinates: 14°33′59″N 121°01′38″E
- Construction started: 2011
- Estimated completion: 2027
- Owner: Picar Development

Height
- Tip: 400 m (1,300 ft)
- Roof: 355 m (1,165 ft)

Technical details
- Floor count: 74 aboveground 9 underground
- Floor area: 3,504.65 m^{2} (37,723.7 sq ft)

Design and construction
- Architect: Jose Pedro Recio
- Architecture firm: Rchitects Inc.
- Developer: Picar Development

The Stratford Residences is an unfinished high-rise residential and commercial building that will rise in Makati, Philippines. It is being developed by Picar Development Inc. The development arm and real estate subsidiary of the AMA Group of Companies owned by Ambassador Amable R. Aguiluz V.

The building was originally meant to have 74 storeys, which would have made it the tallest residential building in the Philippines. Construction of the half-completed building ground to a halt around 2016. In 2022, plans were announced to downsize the building and complete it by 2027.

The Stratford Residences was to serve as the anchor structure to The Picar Place, a mixed-use complex. It will have three towers, retail stores and other commercial structures, such as Buddha Bar which opened in 2012.

== History ==
On 15 June 2011, Picar Development announced its construction of a 74-storey residential condominium that will rise along Kalayaan Avenue in Makati Poblacion. According to its website, the condominium will have 1,136 fully furnished residential studio, two-bedroom, three-bedroom and penthouse units. The Stratford Residences takes inspiration from skyscrapers such as the Hearst Tower and Bank of America Tower (Manhattan), both in New York City.

It was later announced that Tower 3 will house a Mövenpick hotel.. In 2012, Picar Development broke ground for the hotel. It will have 305 European-contemporary designed hotel rooms and 320 residential apartments.

Construction of the building and entire complex grounded to a near-total halt after reaching approximately half its height around 2016. For several years, the site remained largely abandoned, becoming a well-known unfinished building in the Poblacion area.

In 2022, plans were announced to finish the building at its current height, effectively downsizing the building from the initial 74-storeys, with completion set for 2027.

== Architecture and design ==
The Stratford Residences was designed by Filipino architect Jose Pedro C. Recio of Rchitects, Inc.

But according to Aguiluz, its "folded facade is not just for aesthetics, it helps in capturing and maximizing the presence of natural and artificial light." The model units have been designed by Ivy and Cynthia Almario, and "feature neutral hints of steel gray, slate and white, the pad’s premium fixtures, structured proportions and minimalistic design elements convey a functional yet contemporary space..."

The residents will have 24-hour concierge service, remote-controlled lighting system, Wi-Fi access on all floors, security control systems, as well as energy, ventilation and communication technology features.

The first three floors of the condominium will be allotted for commercial establishments. It will also have nine underground floors for its parking area, which will have the capacity of 700 cars.

As of April 2026, construction is moving at a slow pace, with repainting and exterior works underway.

== Amenities ==
The Stratford Residences' amenities will include a fitness center, meditation garden, lanai, adult- and kiddie-sized swimming pools, a day care center for children and a play area. The Stratford Residences will also have a music library, a private mini-theater, and a function room.

== Reception ==
In 2009, BCI Asia awarded The Stratford Residences the Best Design award for its distinct curvilinear design.

== See also ==
- List of tallest buildings in the Philippines
