= BDO Corporate Center Makati =

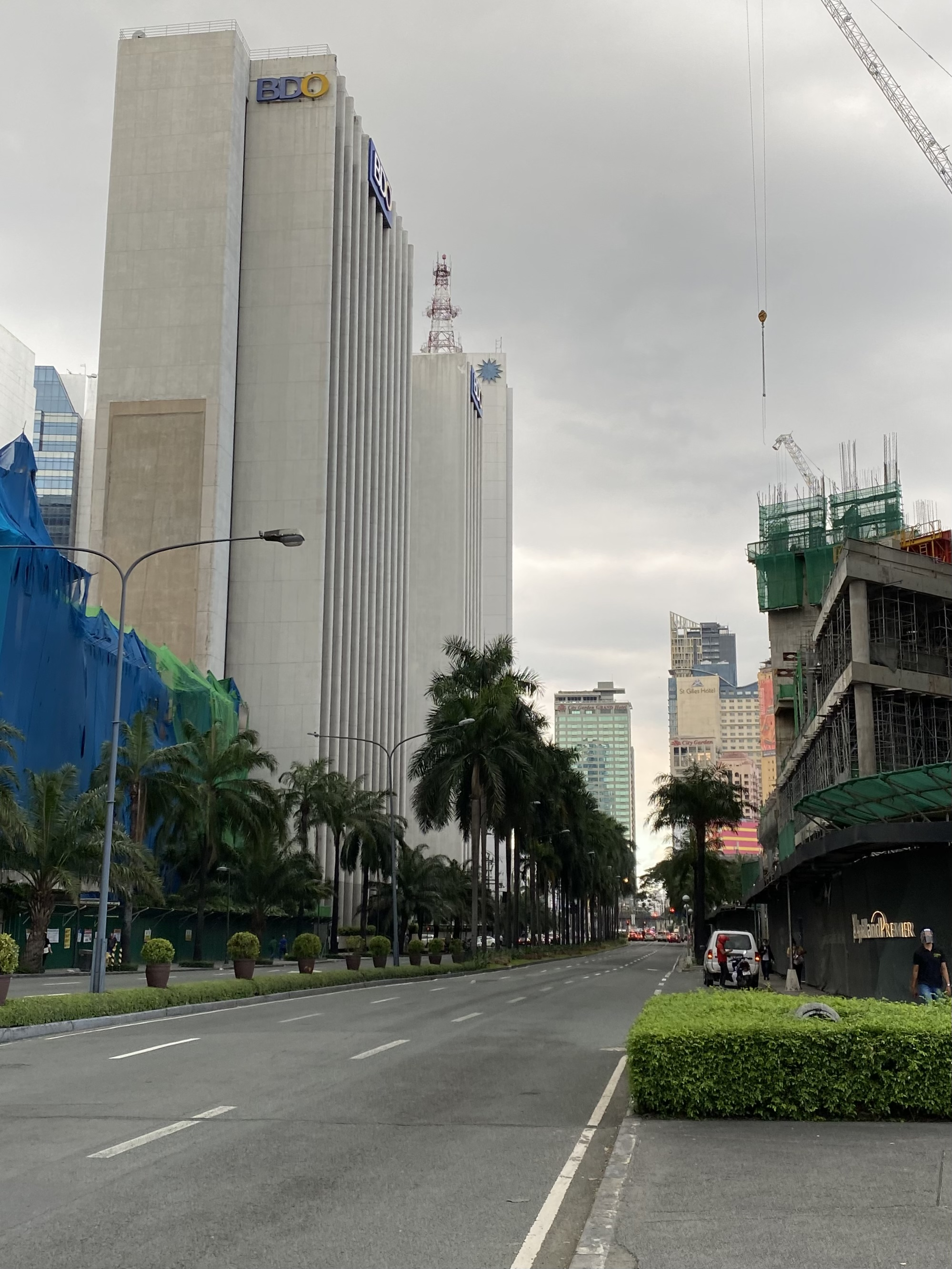

General information
- Status: Demolished
- Type: Office
- Location: Makati, Philippines
- Demolished: 2022

Design and construction
- Architect: Leandro Locsin

The old BDO Corporate Center Makati, formerly the PCI Bank Towers, was a two-skyscraper complex in Makati, Metro Manila, Philippines.

== History ==
It was the headquarters of Equitable PCI Bank until its merger with Banco de Oro (later known as BDO Unibank) in 2007.

Demolition work on the building complex started as early as March 2022, by BDO Unibank. It obtained a demolition permit in December 2021 with JLC Construction as its constructor.

The National Commission for Culture and the Arts issued a cease and decease order against the demolition in August 2022. Heritage advocates behind the brutalist.ph website would publicize the order in the following month and reported that the South Tower is already half-way demolished.

== Architecture and heritage status ==
The complex was designed by National Artist Leandro Locsin, and was considered as an Important Cultural Property.

== Replacement ==
The towers are to be replaced with a new complex with two-towers connected by a multi-storey structure. The towers, designed by Foster and Partners, will stand at 272 m (892 ft) and 220 m (720 ft) tall.

Upon completion in 2028, the taller tower will become the tallest steel structure in the Philippines. The towers will have a steel frame and buckling-restrained braced frame which will be made by Chinese firm Jinggong Steel International.
