= Gil Puyat Avenue =

Road in Metro Manila, Philippines

Coordinates: 14°33′31″N 121°0′35″E

Gil Puyat Avenue
- Buendia Avenue
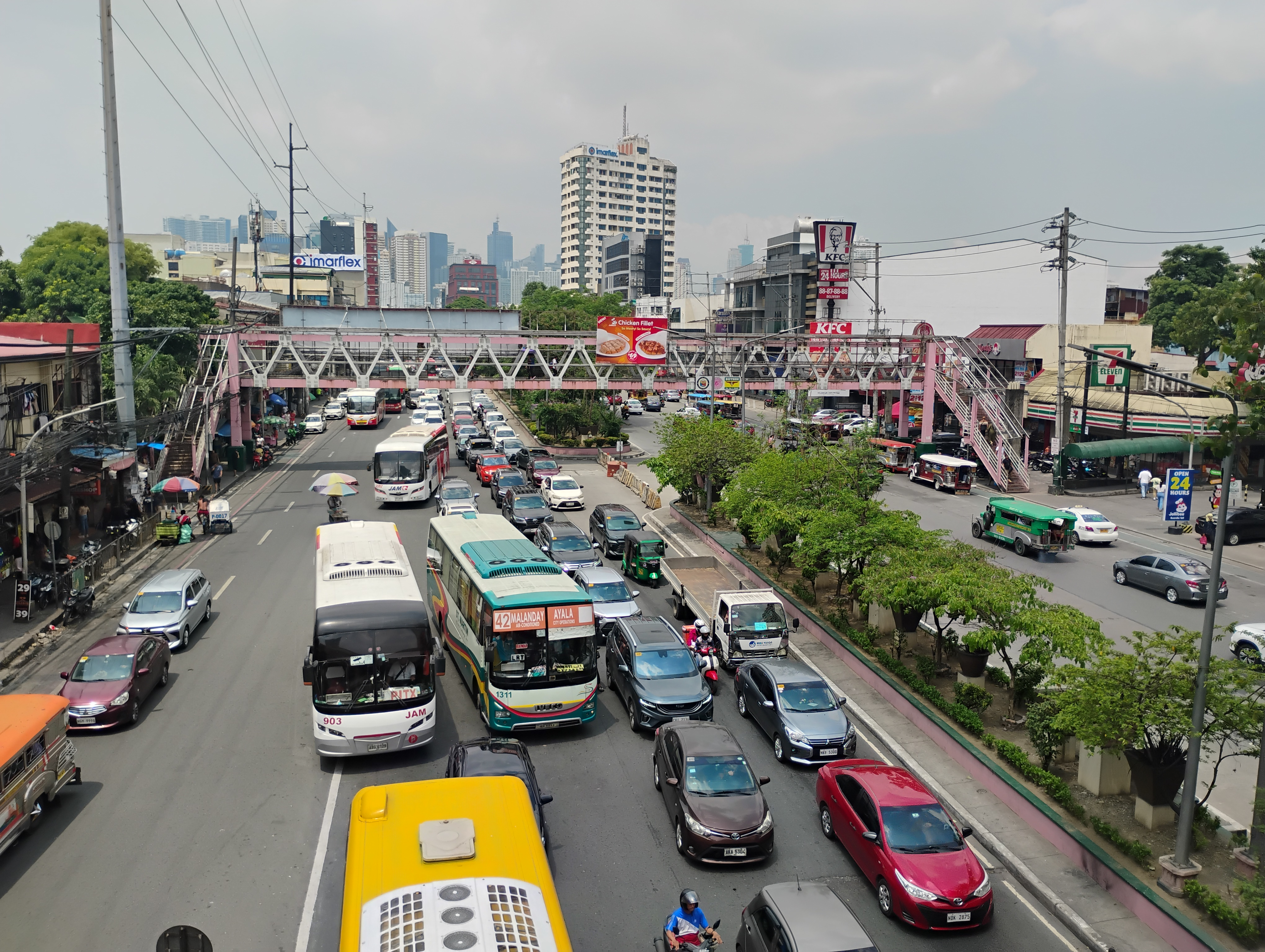
- The avenue in Pasay, photographed in 2025

Route information
- Maintained by the Department of Public Works and Highways
- Length: 5.4 km (3.4 mi)
- Component highways: N190 from Roxas Boulevard to Epifanio de los Santos Avenue

Major junctions
- West end: Jose W. Diokno Boulevard / Atang Dela Rama Street / Zoilo Hilario Street in Pasay
- AH26 (Roxas Boulevard); N170 (Taft Avenue); N145 (Osmeña Highway)
- East end: AH26 (Epifanio de los Santos Avenue) in Makati

Location
- Country: Philippines
- Major cities: Makati and Pasay

Highway system
- Roads in the Philippines; Highways; Expressways; List

Senator Gil J. Puyat Avenue, also known simply as Gil Puyat Avenue and by its former official name Buendia Avenue, is a major arterial thoroughfare which runs east–west through Makati and Pasay in western Metro Manila, Philippines. It is one of the busiest avenues in Metro Manila, linking the Makati Central Business District with the rest of the metropolis.

The entire route currently forms part of National Route 190 (N190) of the Philippine highway network. Part of the avenue from Roxas Boulevard to Epifanio de los Santos Avenue was previously designated as a component of Circumferential Road 3 of the Metro Manila Arterial Road System.

== Etymology ==
Since 1982, this 4-to-12-lane divided avenue is named after Gil J. Puyat, a Filipino senator who served from 1951 to 1972. It was originally named Buendia Avenue after Nicolas Buendia, a Katipunero and politician from Bulacan. Additionally, Buendia is a Spanish surname from an interjection of the phrase buenos días, meaning "good morning"; buen día itself is a literal Spanish translation of "good day."

=== Alternate names ===
According to the Department of Public Works and Highways, the avenue's extension from Roxas Boulevard to Jose W. Diokno Boulevard in Pasay also has alternative names that vary per segment. Its segment from Roxas Boulevard to the zipper lane of Magdalena Jalandoni Street is alternatively known as Spine Road, while its segment from thereon to Atang Dela Rama Street is alternatively known as Manila Film Center Main Road, after the Manila Film Center. Both are designated as national tertiary roads.

=== "Gil Tulog" publicity stunt ===
In July 2024, several street signs along the avenue in Makati were replaced with signs saying "Gil Tulog Ave. (formerly Gil Puyat)" as part of a publicity stunt by Wellspring, a melatonin brand, in collaboration with Gigil. The name was a wordplay on the Filipino words puyat (sleepless) and tulog (sleep). On July 26, however, Makati mayor Abby Binay ordered the removal of these signs, citing that city officials had approved the stunt without her knowledge and that the request would have been rejected had it reached her office. The stunt was also criticized by Gil Puyat's family, who called it a "disrespect" to their family name and filed charges against Gigil with the Ad Standards Council. Both Wellspring and Gigil later issued separate apologies to the Puyat family, with Wellspring also apologizing to Binay.

== Route description ==
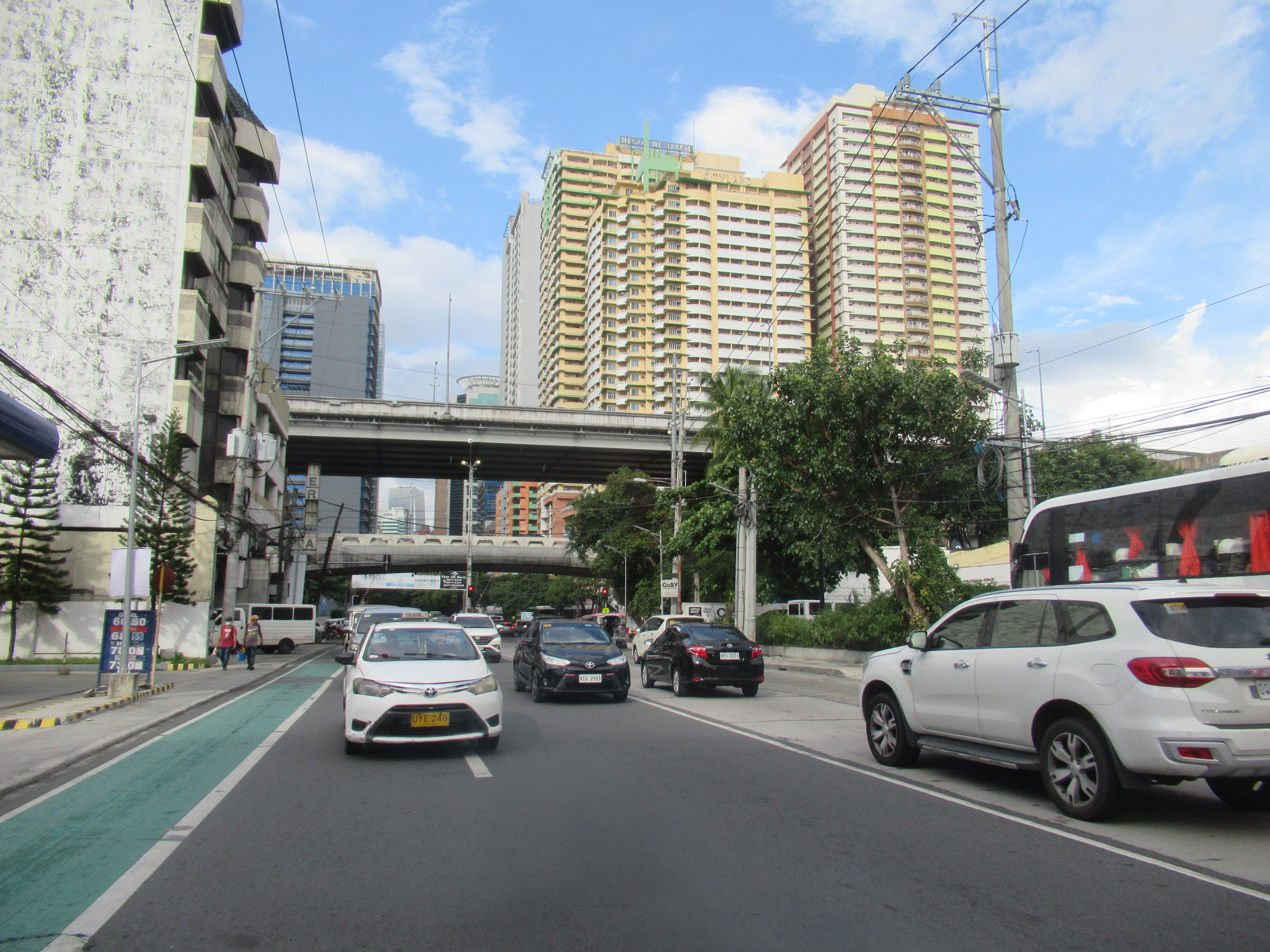
Gil Puyat Avenue eastbound towards Osmeña Highway in Makati

The avenue begins at an unsignaled intersection with Jose W. Diokno Boulevard and Atang Dela Rama Street, continuing from Zoilo Hilario Street in Bay City, Pasay. It then intersects Macapagal Boulevard, Magdalena Jalandoni Street, Roxas Boulevard, F.B. Harrison, Leveriza, Donada, and A. Luna Streets. West of its intersection with Taft Avenue, several bus terminals, including JAC Liner and DLTBCo., are located along the avenue.

It enters the city of Makati after crossing the Estero de Tripa de Gallina. It narrows as a four-lane road from Edison Street to Osmeña Highway. After its intersection with Osmeña Highway, it becomes divided by a center island once again for the rest of its route as it traverses the Makati Central Business District. Past Ayala Avenue, it enters Bel-Air, where several office buildings are located along the avenue, including Petron Megaplaza and Pacific Star Building, which used to be the country's tallest buildings from 1989 to 1992 and 1998 to 2000, respectively. It then intersects some of the CBD's streets, Nicanor Garcia Street, Makati Avenue, Paseo de Roxas, and Urdaneta Avenue, which provides access into the gated Urdaneta Village, before meeting Kalayaan Flyover and its eastern terminus at Epifanio de los Santos Avenue. The avenue extends into the gated Forbes Park in Makati as Buendia Avenue Extension.

It is also part of a clearway scheme from Roxas Boulevard in Pasay to Edison Street in Makati. Vehicles from Leveriza, F.B. Harrison, Donada/A. Luna, Taft Avenue, Sandejas/Fernando, Dominga/P. Burgos, Tramo Street, and Emilia Street are not allowed to cross the avenue; instead, motorists can use the U-turn slots on Gil Puyat Avenue 100 meters (330 ft) away to reach their destinations. Left turns are also not allowed between Edison and Malugay Streets in Makati. Instead, motorists have to use side streets to reach their destinations.

== History ==
Based on 1940s maps, the avenue traces its origin as a short street named Calle Buendia, stretching between Calle P. Burgos (its portion north of the avenue is now Dominga Street) and Calle Luna (now Donada Street) in Pasay. It was extended westward to the Manila Bay shoreline, occupying the former Calle Ochoa in Pasay and eastward to the former Nielson Field in Makati. Subsequently, it was extended to the present-day Bay City reclamation to the west and Epifanio de los Santos Avenue to the east, following the development of the Makati Central Business District. On November 14, 1982, Buendia Avenue was officially renamed to Senator Gil J. Puyat Avenue by virtue of Batas Pambansa Bilang 312.

== Future developments ==
In 2014, under the Roadmap for Transport Infrastructure Development for Metro Manila and Its Surrounding Areas (Region III & Region IV-A; also known as the Metro Manila Dream Plan), the Japan International Cooperation Agency study proposes a dual two-lane elevated expressway from the intersection of Roxas Boulevard and this road to the intersection of C-5 and Kalayaan Avenue for about 9.3 kilometers (5.8 mi).

A 600-meter (2,000 ft) Buendia Tunnel was proposed to run along the avenue in Makati, crossing its intersections with Makati Avenue and Paseo de Roxas. Construction began in 2015. However, the project was later shelved.

== Landmarks ==
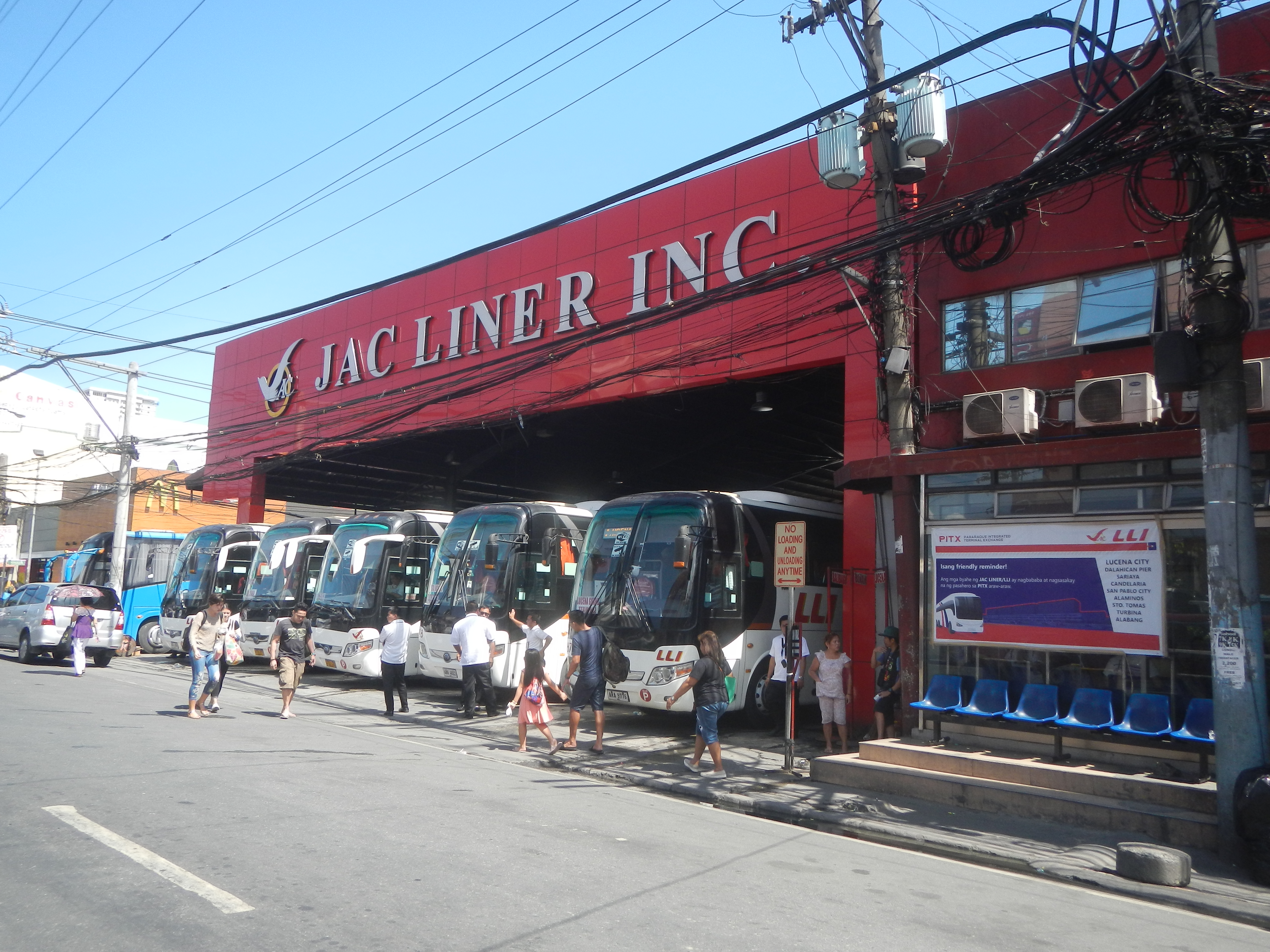
JAC Liner Bus Terminal, Pasay

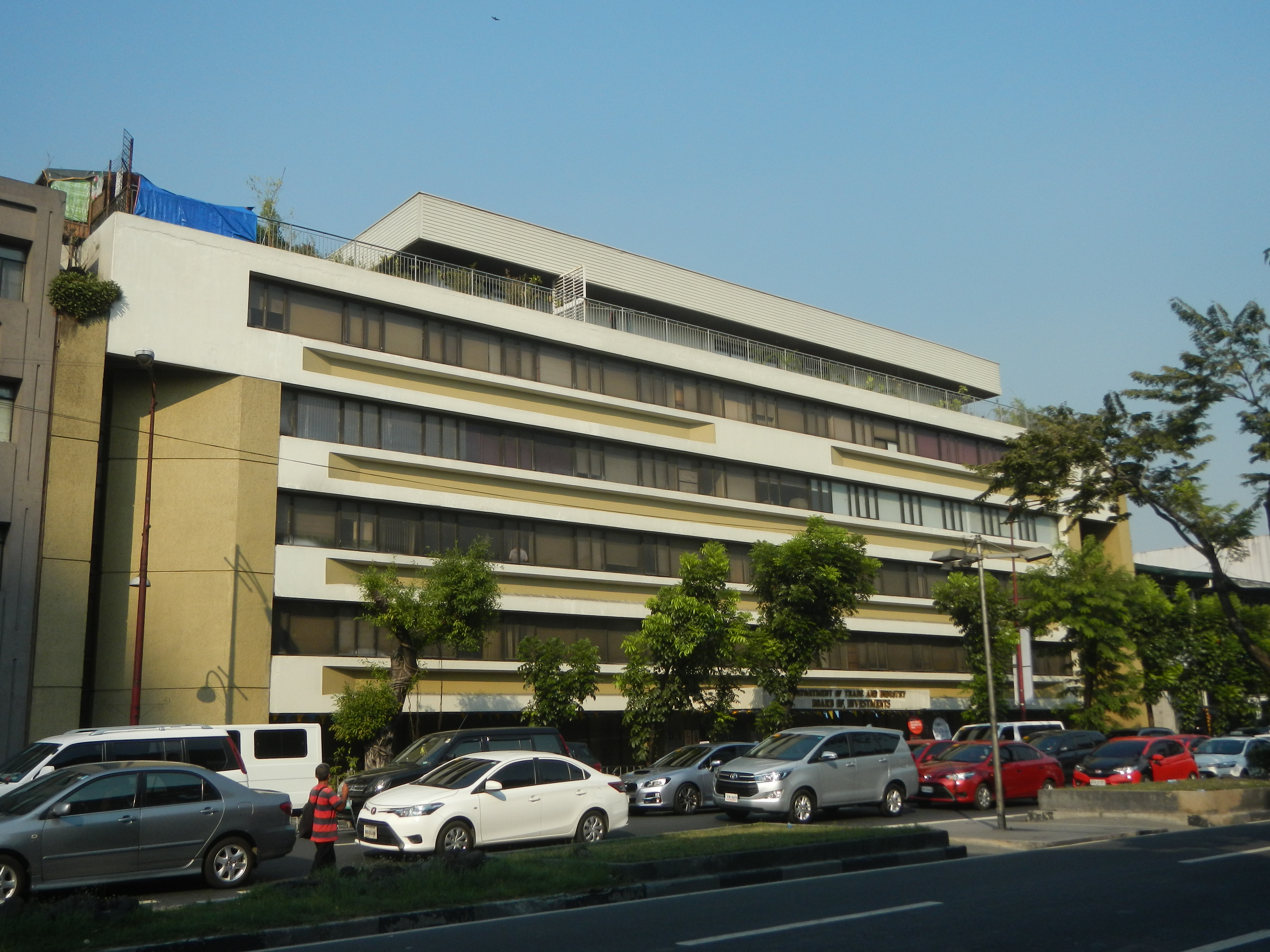
Industry and Investments Building in Makati, which houses the headquarters of the Board of Investments

Gil Puyat Avenue travels between the neighborhoods of Leveriza, San Jose, San Isidro, and Santa Clara in Pasay and barangays Palanan, San Isidro, San Antonio, Pio del Pilar, San Lorenzo, Bel-Air, and Urdaneta in Makati. It is the site of some of the tallest buildings in Metro Manila, such as RCBC Plaza on the junction with Ayala Avenue and Petron Megaplaza, the country's tallest building from 1998 to 2000. It also hosts the Pacific Star Building, Grand Soho Makati, The World Centre, One Central Makati, Exportbank Plaza, as well as the New Makati Central Fire Station and headquarters of the Department of Trade and Industry, Department of Tourism, and Philippine Board of Investments. Landbank of the Philippines was also formerly headquartered along this avenue before the construction of its new building in Malate District, City of Manila.

The stretch of Gil Puyat between Makati Avenue and Paseo de Roxas hosts the headquarters of the Metropolitan Bank and Trust Company (under demolition) and the Development Bank of the Philippines on Roxas Triangle. Several educational institutions are also located on the avenue, such as Pasay City Academy, Andres Bonifacio Elementary School, and the Makati campuses of Far Eastern University, Centro Escolar University, and iAcademy; Mapúa University used to have its Makati campus along the avenue. The avenue's other notable landmarks in Makati are the Makati Central Post Office, One Pacific Place, Burgundy Tower, West of Ayala Tower, Teleperformance Center, and SM Cyber Makati. The avenue is also the location of government offices such as the Field Office of Department of Migrant Workers, Central Offices of the Philippines' Department of Tourism, Philippine Guarantee Corporation, Metro Manila offices of the National Police Commission, and the Bureau of Internal Revenue's district offices serving Pasay, Makati, and southern National Capital Region, respectively.

Gil Puyat Avenue in Pasay is the site of Networld Hotel Spa and Casino, World Trade Center Manila, and the CCP Open Grounds. The intersection with Taft Avenue is the location of several provincial bus terminals, including DLTBCo, JAM Liner, JAC Liner, and LLi (formerly Green Star Express).

== Transportation ==
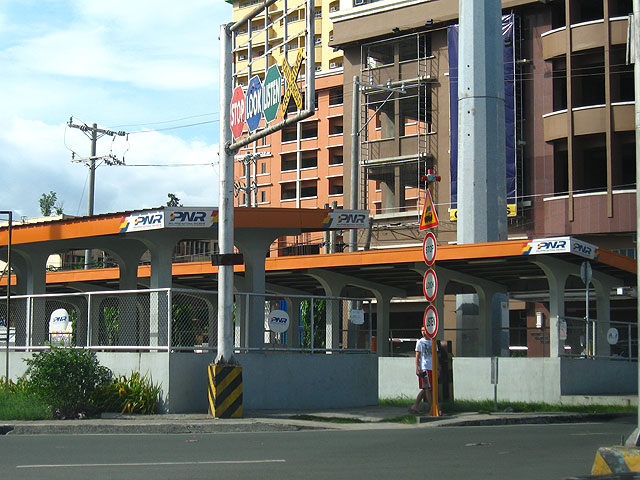
Buendia PNR Station at the junction with Osmeña Highway in Makati, before closure for the construction of the NSCR.

Gil Puyat Avenue is a major stop on three lines of the Metro Manila Transit System.

- Gil Puyat Station at Taft Avenue that is served by LRT-1;
- Buendia Station at Epifanio de los Santos Avenue (Major portion of C-4 Road) that is served by MRT-3; and
- Buendia railway station along Osmeña Highway that was served by PNR and will be served by North–South Commuter Railway (NSCR).
  - This station closed when Dela Rosa railway station, located one block southwards, replaced it from 2017 to 2024.

Green Frog Transport Corp. operates hybrid buses serving the route between Gil Puyat and Kalayaan Avenue and the bus transit between Parañaque Integrated Terminal Exchange and Bonifacio Global City. Provincial buses with terminals along the avenue's section in Pasay, as well as regular and air-conditioned jeepneys, also serve the route.

== Intersections and junctions ==
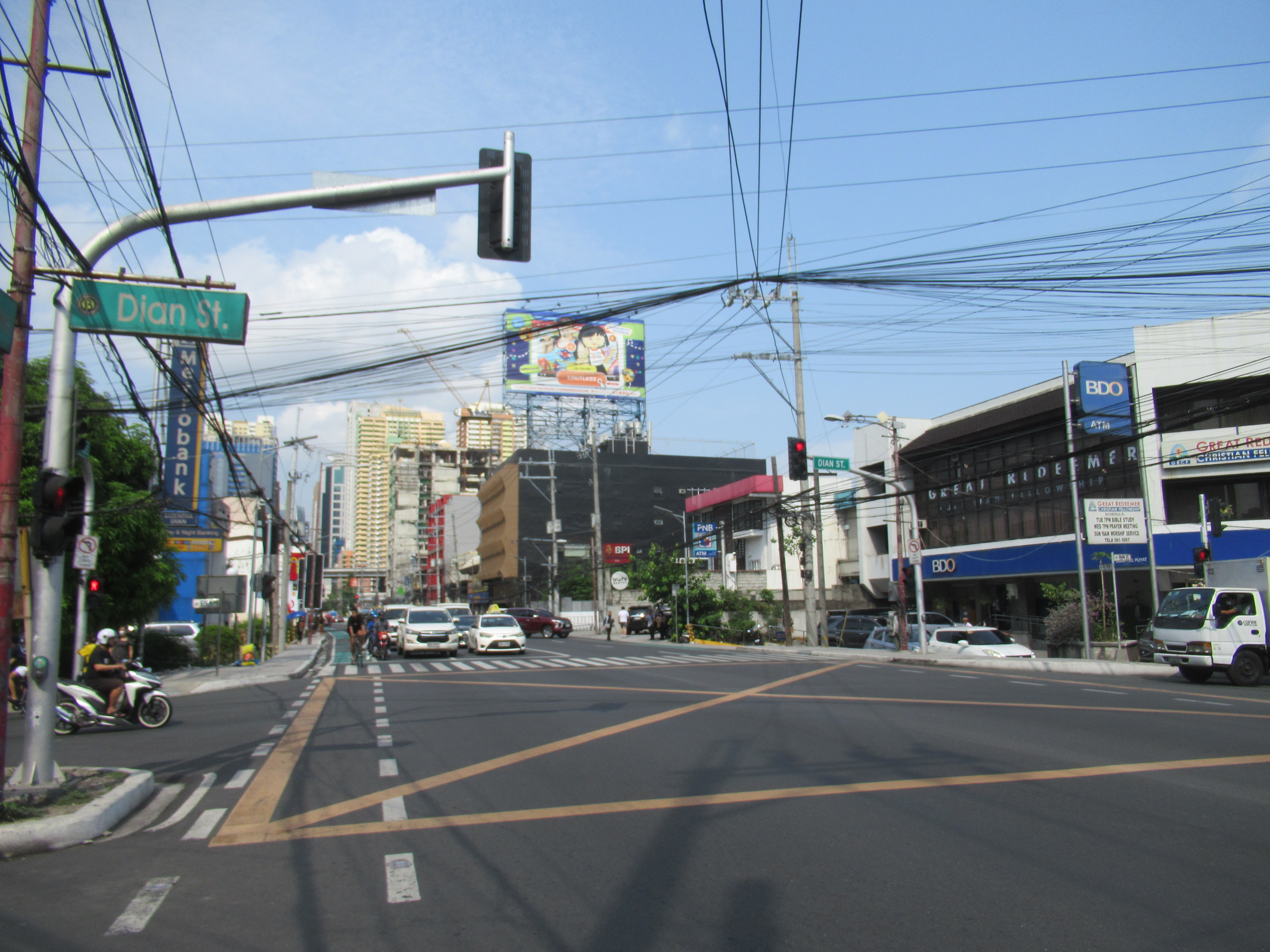
Intersection of Gil Puyat Avenue and Dian Street

Here is a list of junctions and distances according to the Department of Public Works and Highways. Rizal Park in Manila is designated as kilometer zero.

Province	City/Municipality	km	mi	Destinations	Notes
Pasay				Jose W. Diokno Boulevard / Atang Dela Rama Street	Western terminus. Continues west as Zoilo Hilario Street.
Pasay				Macapagal Boulevard / Magdalena Jalandoni Street	Traffic light intersection
Pasay		3.286	2.042	AH26 (Roxas Boulevard); R-1	Former traffic light intersection. Transition from unnumbered to N190.
Pasay				F.B. Harrison Street	Access from opposite directions via U-turn slot, former traffic light intersection.
Pasay				Leveriza Street	Access from opposite directions via u-turn slot, former traffic light intersection.
Pasay				Donada Street / A. Luna Street	Access from opposite directions via u-turn slot; no entry to Donada Street.
Pasay				N170 (Taft Avenue); R-2	Traffic light intersection beneath Gil Puyat station; no left turn allowed from Gil Puyat westbound.
Pasay				Sandejas Street / F. Fernando Street	Access to opposite directions via u-turn slot.
Pasay				Dominga Street / P. Burgos Street	Access to opposite directions via u-turn slot.
Pasay				Tramo Street	U-turn slot and unsignaled intersection. No left turn allowed from Gil Puyat westbound.
Pasay				Emilia Street	Westbound entrance.
Tripa de Gallina Creek		4.724	2.935	Tripa de Gallina Bridge	
Makati				Marconi Street	Westbound access only.
Makati				Edison Street	Eastbound exit. Alternative route to Skyway (southbound).
Makati				Bautista Street	Traffic light intersection.
Makati				Dian Street	Traffic light intersection.
Makati				Filmore Street / Batangas Street	Traffic light intersection.
Makati				N145 (Osmeña Highway); R-3	Traffic light intersection. Also provides access to Skyway. No left turn allowed from both directions.
Makati				Mayapis Street / Medina Street	Westbound exit and eastbound entrance. No access from opposite directions.
Makati				Washington Street	Eastbound entrance and exit. Provides access into Barangay Pio del Pilar.
Makati				Chino Roces Avenue	Traffic light intersection.
Makati				Tindalo Street / Urban Avenue	No access from opposite directions.
Makati				Ayala Avenue	Traffic light intersection.
Makati				Zuellig Loop / Geronimo Street	No access from opposite directions.
Makati				Malugay Street / Tordesillas Street	Traffic light intersection. No left turn allowed from eastbound.
Makati				Nicanor Garcia Street	Traffic light intersection.
Makati				Buendia Extension Access Road	Eastbound entrance and exit only.
Makati				Makati Avenue	Traffic light intersection.
Makati				Paseo de Roxas	Traffic light intersection.
Makati				Urdaneta Avenue	Eastbound entrance and exit only; access to Urdaneta Village.
Makati				West end of N191 (Kalayaan Flyover)	
Makati				Zodiac Street	Westbound entrance and exit only.
Makati				AH26 (EDSA) – Baclaran; C-4	Eastern terminus. Eastern terminus of N190. Continues eastward into Forbes Park North village as Buendia Avenue Extension.
1.000 mi = 1.609 km; 1.000 km = 0.621 mi: Incomplete access; Route transition
