= EDSA =

Limited-access circumferential highway around Metro Manila

C-4 Epifanio de los Santos Avenue
- EDSA
- Map of highways in Metro Manila with EDSA highlighted in red.

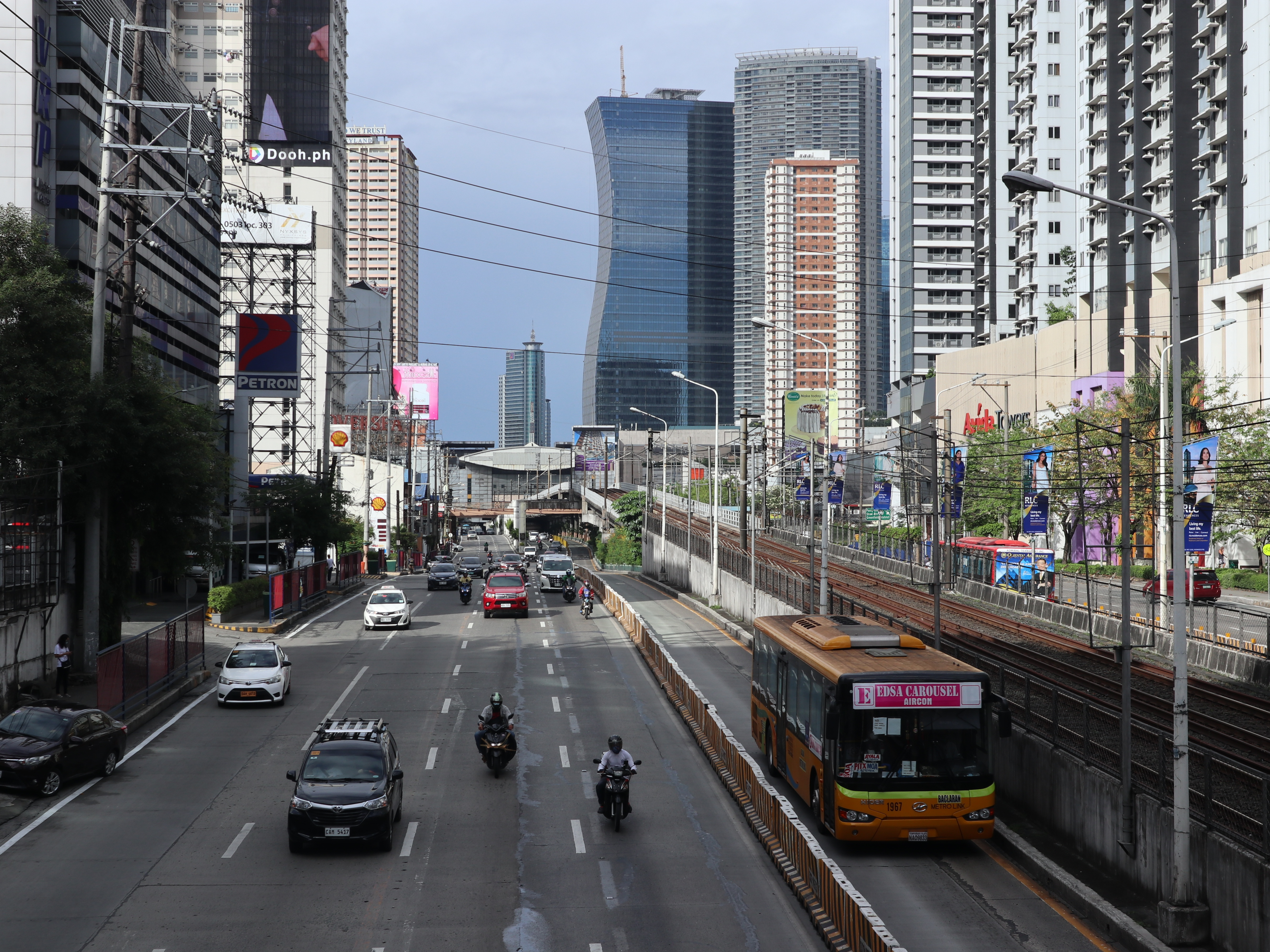
- EDSA in Mandaluyong, with Ortigas Center in the background

Route information
- Part of AH26
- Maintained by the Department of Public Works and Highways, (Note: Section from Bonifacio Monument in Caloocan until Roxas Boulevard in Pasay.) Philippine Reclamation Authority, (Note: Short extension section of the road from Roxas Boulevard to SM Mall of Asia.) and Metropolitan Manila Development Authority (Note: Traffic management for the whole road both the original and extension sections.)
- Length: 23.8 km (14.8 mi) Including PRA-maintained short extension portion in Bay City, Pasay
- Existed: 1940–present
- Component highways: C-4 C-4; AH26 from Monumento to Roxas Boulevard
- Restrictions: No heavy trucks, tricycles

Major junctions
- Beltway around Manila
- North end: AH26 (Bonifacio Monument Circle) in Caloocan
- AH26 (North Luzon Expressway) / N160 (Andres Bonifacio Avenue) at Balintawak Interchange in Quezon City; N171 (West Avenue) / N173 (North Avenue) in Quezon City; N170 (Quezon Avenue) in Quezon City; N172 (Timog Avenue) / N174 (East Avenue) in Quezon City; N180 / N59 (Aurora Boulevard) in Quezon City; N184 / N60 (Ortigas Avenue) at Ortigas Interchange in Quezon City and Mandaluyong; N141 (Shaw Boulevard) in Mandaluyong; N190 (Gil Puyat Avenue / Kalayaan Avenue) at Kalayaan Flyover in Makati; N145 (Osmeña Highway) / AH26 (South Luzon Expressway) at Magallanes Interchange in Makati; N170 (Taft Avenue) in Pasay; AH26 / N61 (Roxas Boulevard) in Pasay; Macapagal Boulevard in Pasay
- South end: SM Mall of Asia Globe Rotunda in J.W. Diokno Boulevard, Pasay

Location
- Country: Philippines
- Major cities: Caloocan, Makati, Mandaluyong, Pasay, Quezon City, San Juan

Highway system
- Roads in the Philippines; Highways; Expressways; List

Epifanio de los Santos Avenue, commonly referred to by its acronym EDSA (Tagalog: [ˈʔɛd.sɐ]), is a major circumferential road around Metro Manila, Philippines named after academic Epifanio de los Santos. It passes through 6 of Metro Manila's 17 local government units or cities, namely, from north to south, Caloocan, Quezon City, San Juan, Mandaluyong, Makati, and Pasay. It is the longest and the most congested highway in the metropolis, stretching some 23.8 kilometers (14.8 mi).

== Structure ==
EDSA forms part of Circumferential Road 4 (C-4) of Metro Manila's arterial road network, National Route 1 (N1) of the Philippine highway network and Asian Highway 26 (AH26) of the Asian Highway Network. The locations around the avenue were marked with great economic and industrial growth, proven by the fact that all but five financial and industrial centers or districts and four SM Supermalls in the metropolis are directly accessible and passing from the thoroughfare which are SM North EDSA, Triangle Park, Araneta City, Ortigas Center, SM Megamall, Makati CBD, SM Makati, Bay City, and SM Mall of Asia. The decent economic growth of the areas around the avenue adds a significant volume of traffic on the avenue, and in recent estimates, and an average of 385,096 vehicles go through it every day.

The whole avenue serves as an access point or gateway to other geographical divisions of Luzon outside Metro Manila, Visayas, and the capital city of Manila which are (with notable roads shown in parenthesis):

- Bonifacio Monument in Caloocan to SM North EDSA in Quezon City: Central and Northern Luzon (MacArthur Highway and North Luzon Expressway (NLEX))
- SM North EDSA in Quezon City to SM Mall of Asia in Pasay: Southern Luzon and Visayas (Aurora Boulevard, Ortigas Avenue, Magallanes Interchange to South Luzon Expressway (SLEX) and STAR Tollway, Harrison Street, Elpidio Quirino Avenue and Diego Cera Avenue to Zapote River at the boundary of the metropolitan area's Las Piñas and Bacoor in Cavite, Roxas Boulevard to Manila–Cavite Expressway (CAVITEX), and Macapagal Boulevard and J.W. Diokno Boulevard to Seaside Drive, Pacific Avenue and CAVITEX)
- Bonifacio Monument to Balintawak Interchange and Makati CBD in Makati to SM Mall of Asia: Manila (Rizal Avenue, Andres Bonifacio Avenue, Buendia Avenue, Antonio Arnaiz Avenue, Magallanes Interchange to Osmeña Highway, Taft Avenue, Roxas Boulevard, Macapagal Boulevard, Magdalena Jalandoni Street and Vicente Sotto Street to Roxas Boulevard, and J.W. Diokno Boulevard, Atang Dela Rama Street and also Vicente Sotto Street to Roxas Boulevard).

The road is a divided carriageway, often consisting of 12 lanes, 6 in either direction, with the elevated railroads Manila Metro Rail Transit System Line 3 and Manila Light Rail Transit System Line 1 often serving as its median. Although it is not an expressway, traffic rules and speed limits are strictly implemented to the vehicles that pass along it. It is operated by the Metropolitan Manila Development Authority, and is maintained by the Department of Public Works and Highways from Bonifacio Monument in Caloocan to Roxas Boulevard in Pasay and Philippine Reclamation Authority (PRA) from Roxas Boulevard to SM Mall of Asia.

== Route description ==
Quezon City

Pasay

Street signs used for EDSA

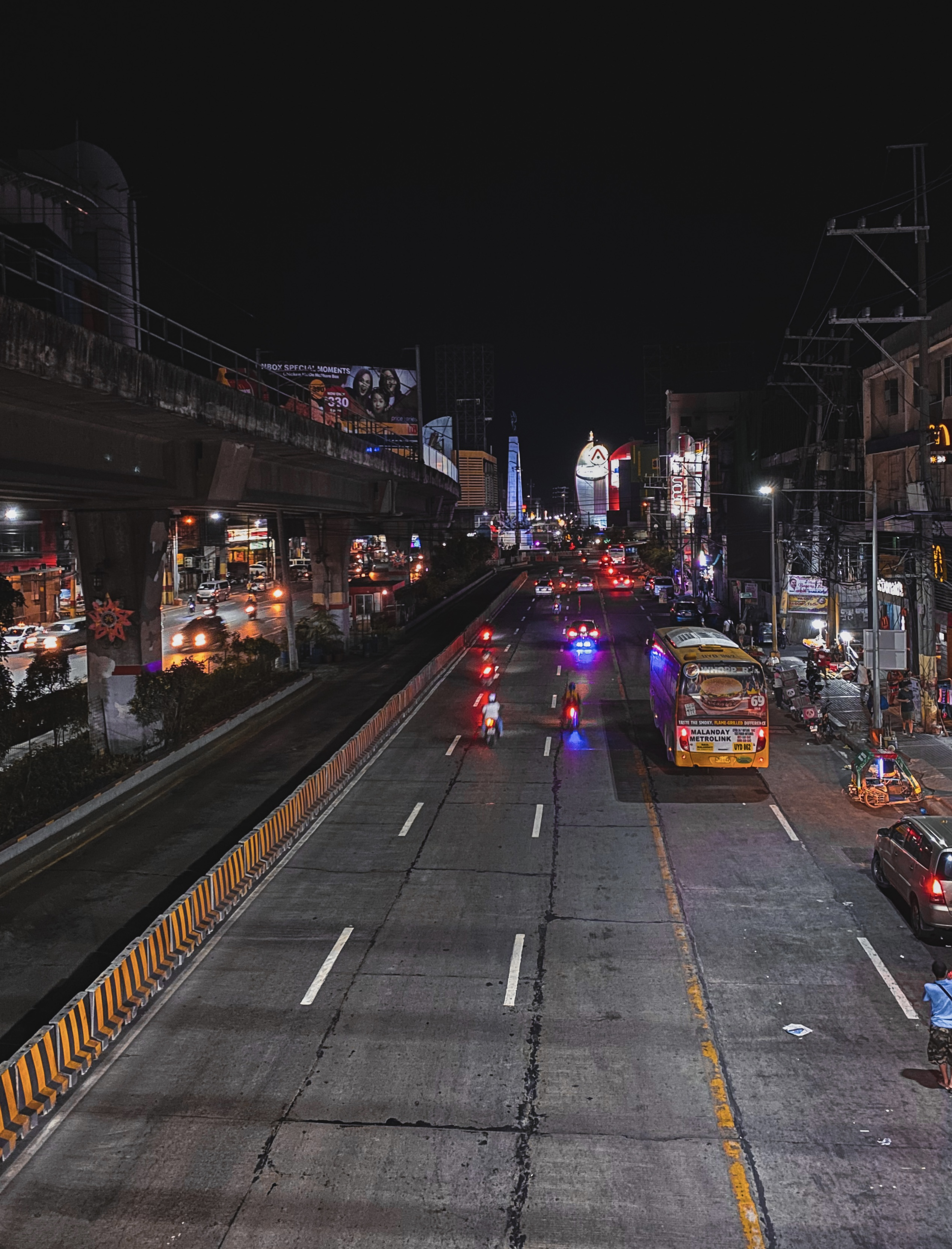
The northern terminus of EDSA at the Bonifacio Monument in Caloocan

EDSA starts from the Bonifacio Monument (Monumento) Circle in Caloocan, its intersection with MacArthur Highway, Rizal Avenue Extension, and Samson Road, the western side of the C-4 Road. This roundabout is also the marker of the 1896 Revolution led by Andres Bonifacio. A 1.7 kilometers (1.1 mi) portion of the road is in Caloocan. The Avenue then enters Quezon City through the Balintawak district, following an intersection with the North Luzon Expressway (NLEX) and A. Bonifacio Avenue at the Balintawak Interchange.

EDSA looking east near SM North EDSA

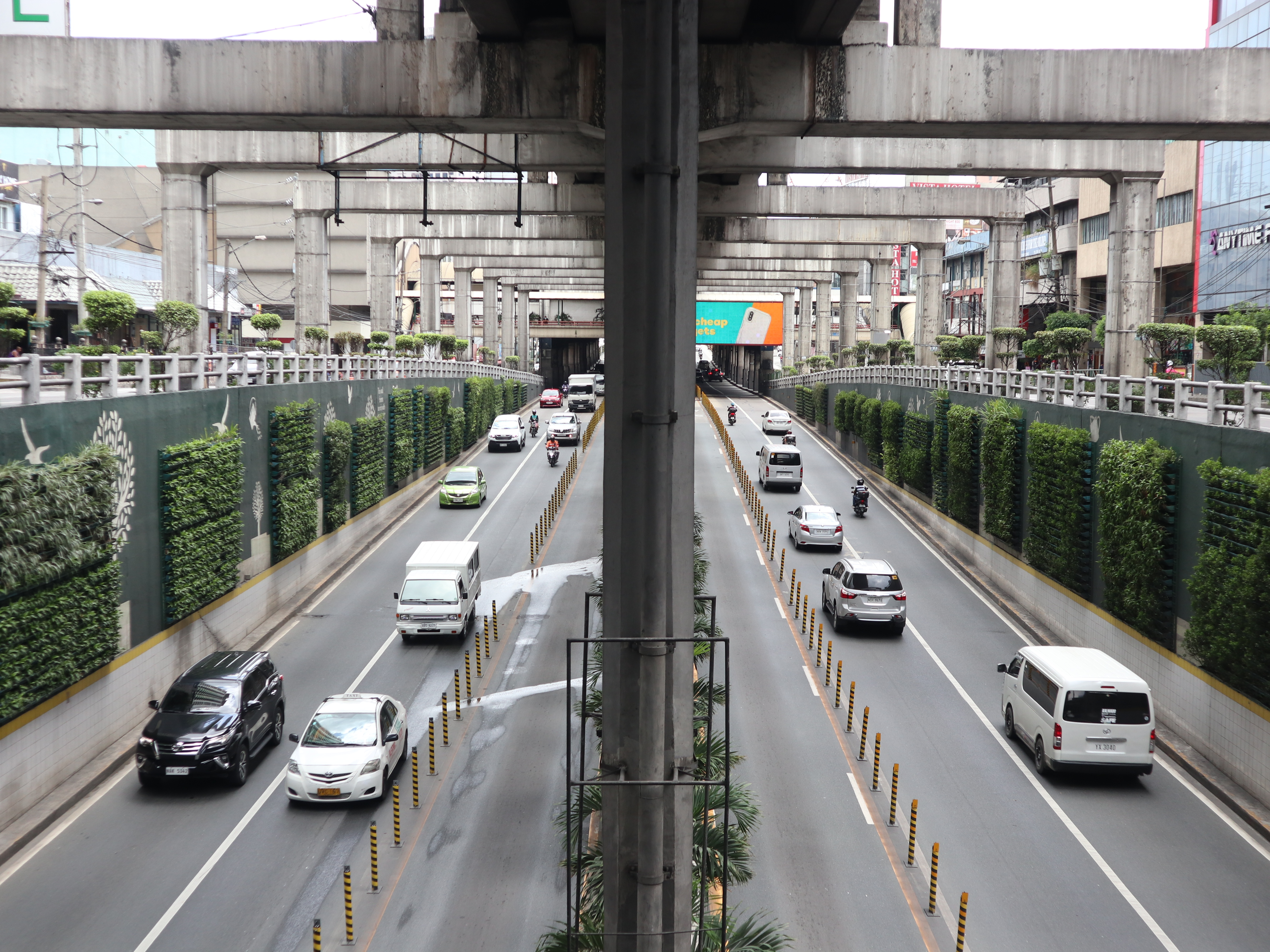
EDSA-Aurora Underpass in Quezon City

EDSA crosses much of the northern part of Quezon City, passing through the Balintawak, Muñoz, and Project 7 districts. It sharply curves southwards after crossing the North Avenue-West Avenue Intersection in the Triangle Business Park. On the north side of EDSA is the SM North EDSA. In front of it are the TriNoma mall, with the Eton Centris seen afterwards. The soon-to-be demolished ABS-CBN Broadcasting Center and transmitter, and ELJ Communications Center, with the whole compound serving as headquarters of ABS-CBN Corporation, can be easily seen from EDSA and continues southwards, slightly turning westwards slowly until it leaves the Triangle Park after crossing the East Avenue-Timog Avenue Intersection, where GMA's GMA Network Center is located. It continues through the district of Cubao, entering the Araneta City after crossing the Aurora Boulevard Tunnel. In Cubao, several malls, infrastructure and offices are located. The Avenue curves southwards and crosses Santolan Road near Socorro, where the twin bases of Camps Crame and Aguinaldo are located. EDSA then continues on its route and serves as the boundary of the cities of San Juan and Quezon City. Primex Tower, the tallest building in San Juan, is located on the southbound side of EDSA at its junction with Connecticut Street, while People Power Monument can be seen on the northbound side of EDSA at its junction with White Plains Avenue. After 11 kilometers (6.8 mi) in Quezon City, EDSA will eventually leave the city, straddling along the boundary with San Juan. EDSA enters Mandaluyong after crossing the borders of the Ortigas Center. In the Ortigas Center, some notable buildings around the area are the Department of Migrant Workers building, Robinsons Galleria, SM Megamall, and the bronze EDSA Shrine, a memorial church to the 1986 People Power Revolution. It then curves smoothly westwards after it crosses Boni Avenue and Pioneer Street, and crosses the Pasig River via the Guadalupe Bridge, leaving the city of Mandaluyong.

After crossing the Pasig River, EDSA enters the city of Makati through Guadalupe, where it provides access to the Rockwell Center, a major mixed-use business park in Makati, through J.P. Rizal Avenue. The highway also provides quick access to the city of Taguig nearby. After crossing Buendia Avenue, the highway enters the Ayala Center, an important commercial district in the Philippines. It also cuts through the exclusive villages of Bel-Air, Forbes Park, Urdaneta, Dasmariñas, and Magallanes. The road then curves eastwards, continues on a straight route to the city of Pasay, and passing the Chino Roces Avenue, Osmeña Highway and South Luzon Expressway (SLEX) through Magallanes Interchange.

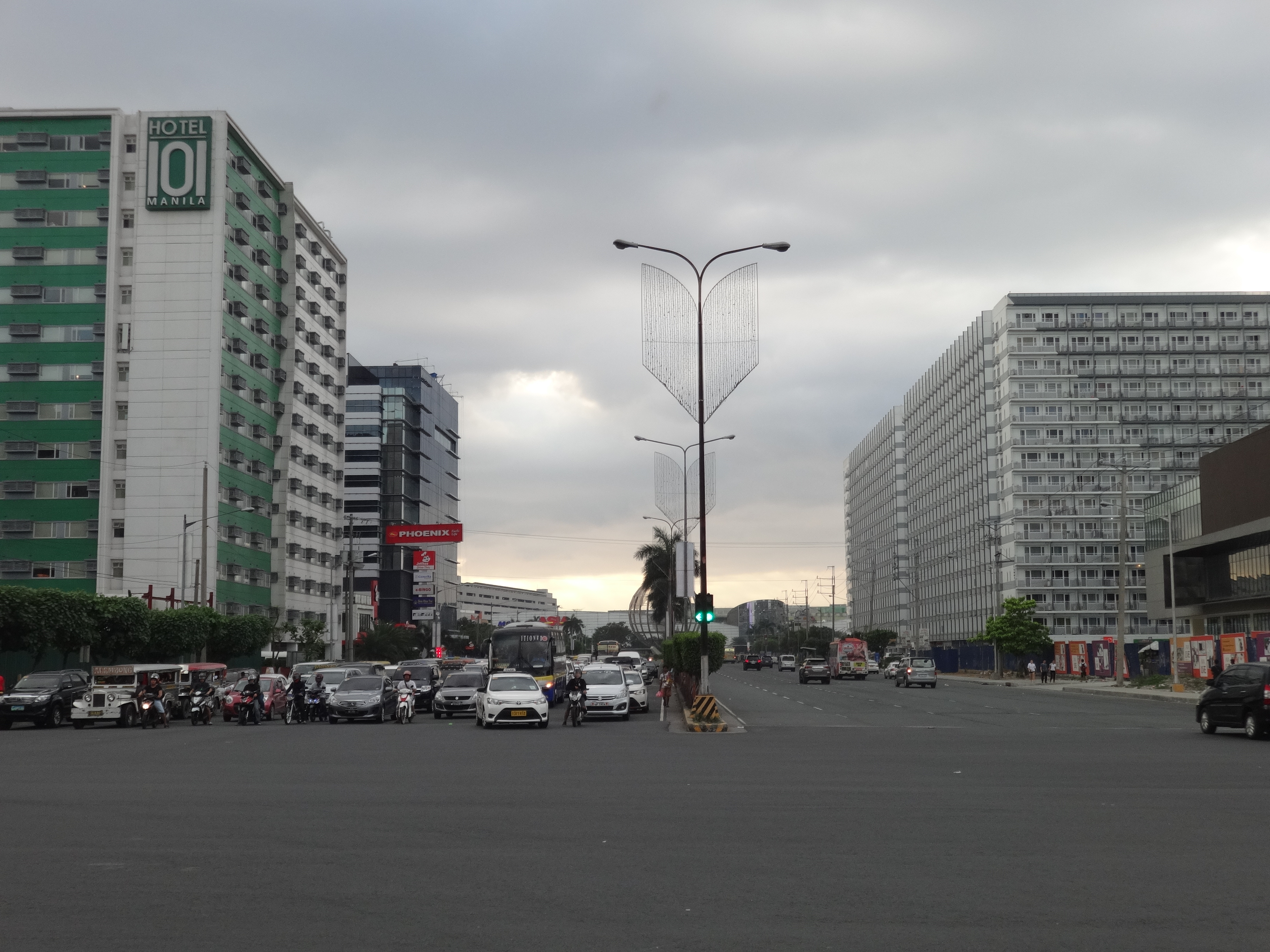
The southern terminus of EDSA at SM Mall of Asia in Pasay, taken at the avenue's newer short extension section intersection with Macapagal Boulevard

EDSA enters Pasay shortly after crossing the Magallanes Interchange. In Pasay, the highway provides access to Ninoy Aquino International Airport via a flyover to Tramo Street. EDSA would pass through Pasay Rotonda within Taft Avenue and continues on a straight route until its terminus at Globe Rotunda and SM Mall of Asia along J.W. Diokno Boulevard. The avenue then intersects with Roxas Boulevard where the former headquarters of ABS-CBN before its relocation to Quezon City which is outside the premises of EDSA but still visible from the avenue and Radio Philippines Network (RPN) can be seen which is now occupied by Kanlaon Condominium as well as being a halfway of the boulevard's landlocked section from Cultural Center of the Philippines (CCP) compound after passing the Bangko Sentral ng Pilipinas (BSP) complex to Manila–Cavite Expressway (CAVITEX). After intersecting Roxas Boulevard, it becomes known as EDSA Extension which is a newer short extension of the avenue where it enters Central Business Park 1-A of the Bay City reclamation area, and crosses the Macapagal Boulevard and Sunrise Drive. EDSA ends at a rotunda and SM mall mentioned before.

=== Bicycle lanes ===
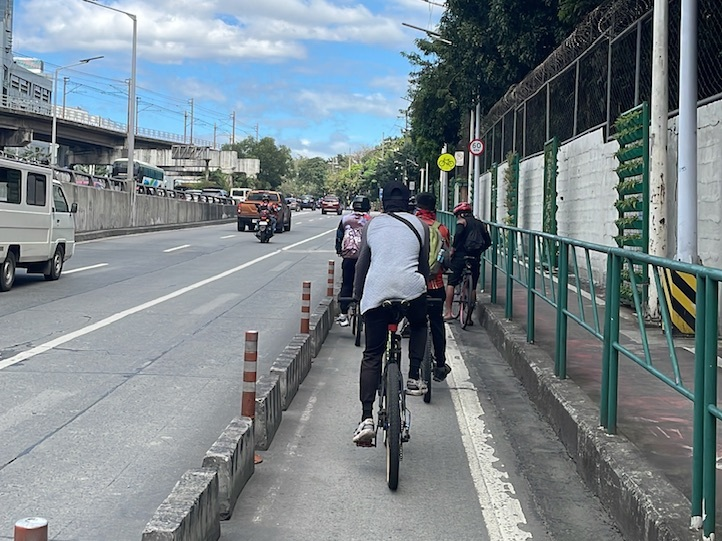
A one-way bike lane with physical protection along EDSA in Quezon City

The entire span of EDSA has one-way Class II bike lanes along both sides of the road, established as part of the national government's Metropolitan Bike Lane Network and funded by the Bayanihan to Recover as One Act during the COVID-19 pandemic. Most of the bicycle lanes along EDSA are paint separated while some sections have physical separation using bollards and concrete barriers. During the rehabilitation, it is slowly being replaced by a shared bicycle and pedestrian lane.

=== Traffic management ===
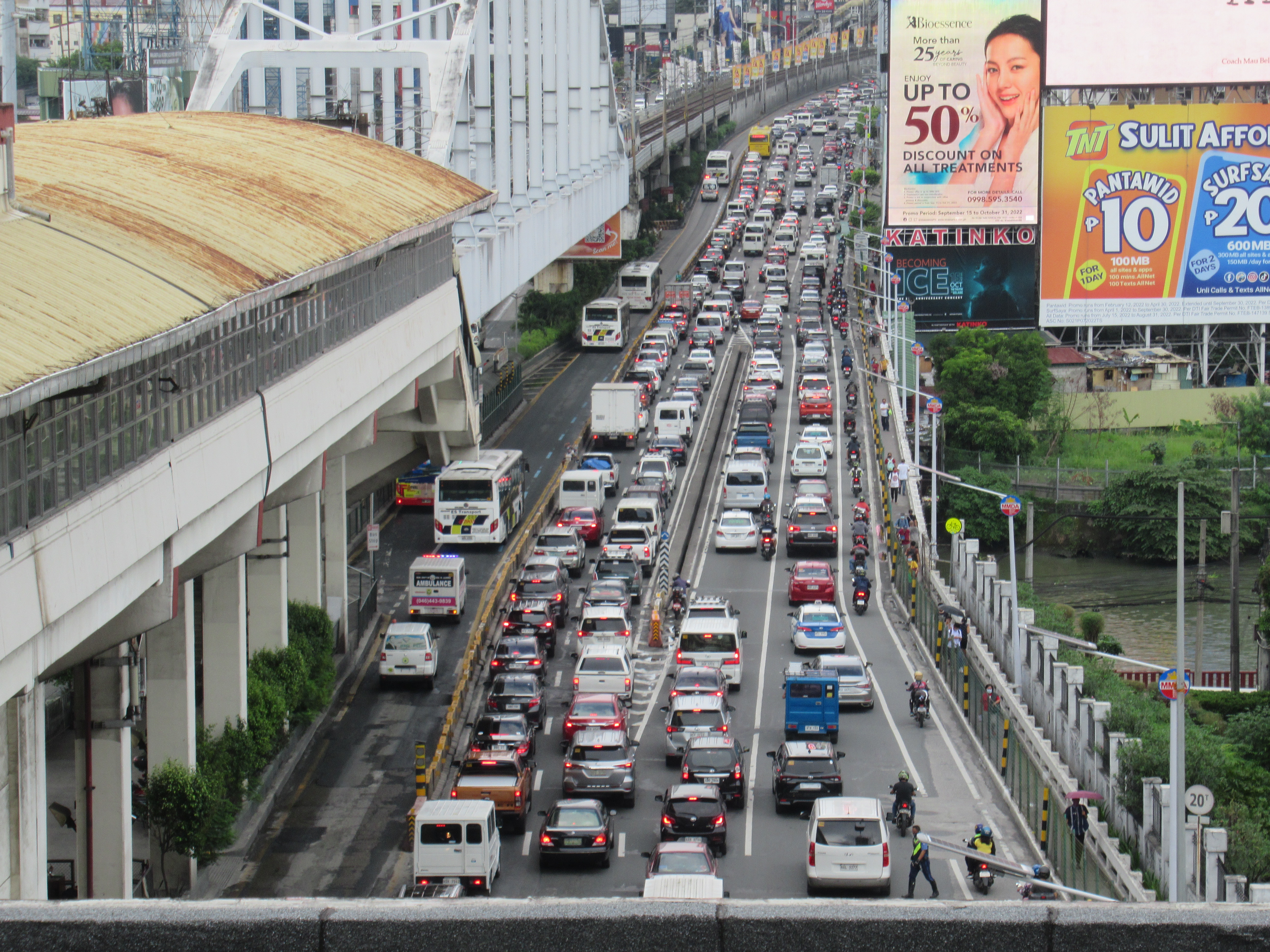
Heavy traffic on Guadalupe Bridge

The lead agency that manages the flow of traffic along EDSA, both the original from Bonifacio Monument to Roxas Boulevard and newer extension sections from Roxas Boulevard to SM Mall of Asia, is the Metropolitan Manila Development Authority (MMDA), a government agency under the Office of the President of the Philippines and is advised by the Metro Manila Mayors League. One of the MMDA's traffic management schemes that is in effect on EDSA, among other major thoroughfares in the metropolis, is the Uniform Vehicular Volume Reduction Program.

Many have observed that the cause of many traffic jams on EDSA is its change from being a highway to an avenue. This resulted the erection of erring establishment, buses and jeepneys. Subsequently, buses have been the target of other traffic management programs, like the MMDA's Organized Bus Route Program. The MMDA is strictly implementing also the Motorcycle and Bus laning in EDSA, making it the second highway in the Philippines ever to have such traffic rule to be enforced, after Commonwealth Avenue. The average speed of vehicles in EDSA is 15 kilometers per hour (9.3 mph).

On January 18, 2016, strict implementation on bus lanes started on the Shaw–Guadalupe segment, where plastic barriers are placed and prohibited entry of private vehicles and taxis on the bus lanes except when turning to EDSA's side streets. Despite the plastic barrier, many private vehicles still enter the lanes.

In June 2020, bus routes in the avenue were rationalized, creating the EDSA Carousel line carried by the new EDSA Busway. The EDSA Busway is separated from normal road traffic and now used only for buses and emergency vehicles. The new bus route spans from Monumento to PITX, while the busway is divided mostly by concreted barriers and steel fences. The old rightmost bus lanes were now opened for all vehicles, with the avenue now having total of four to five public-use lanes per direction instead of three, excluding interchanges.

==== Decongestion program ====
A decongestion program under the Build! Build! Build! Infrastructure Program is ongoing to help decongest EDSA (which is under overcapacity, carrying 402,000 vehicles daily while has the capacity of 288,000). This involves the construction of other roads and bridges that will divert traffic from the avenue. The government aims to reduce travel time from Cubao to Makati to 5–6 minutes.

== History ==
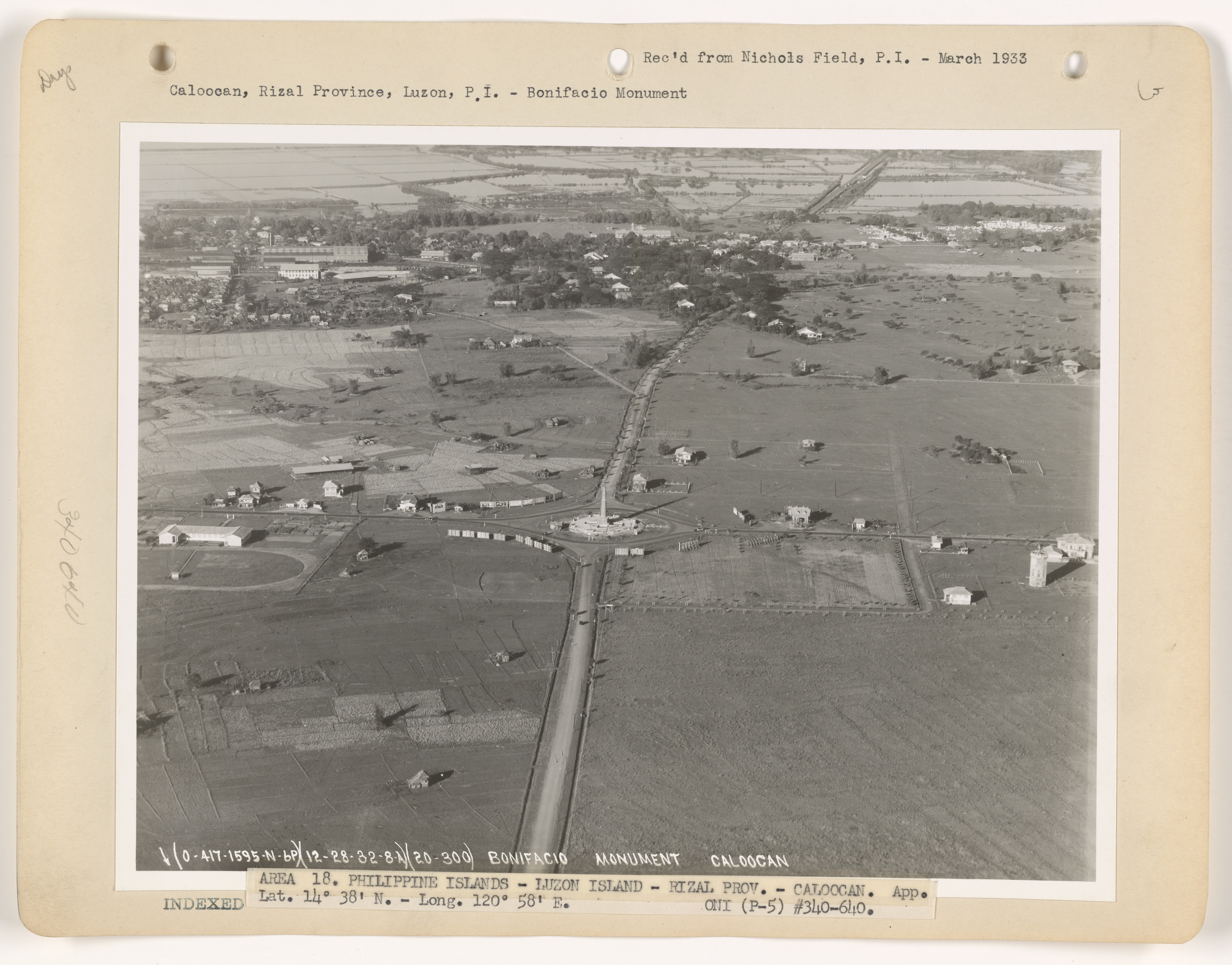
Aerial view showing Calle Samson in Caloocan, 1933. The section in front of the Bonifacio Monument now forms part of EDSA.

Construction of what was then called the North and South Circumferential Road began in 1939 under President Manuel L. Quezon, amidst Manila's rapid expansion. This necessitated inland growth and a planned new capital city, which became Quezon City. The construction team was led by engineers Florencio Moreno and Osmundo Munsod, integrating the former stretch of Calle Apelo Cruz from present-day Cabrera Street to Taft Avenue in Pasay and Calle Samson up to Balintawak in Quezon City at the east.

The road, starting from North Bay Boulevard in Navotas and ending at Taft Avenue (formerly known as Taft Avenue Extension / Manila South Road) in Pasay, both then in Rizal, was partially opened in 1940, shortly before the outbreak of World War II and the subsequent Japanese occupation. However, was then discontinuous due to the Pasig River. It was then known as the Manila Circumferential Road or simply as Circumferential Road. During the war, its section in Diliman Estate served as a runway of the Quezon Airfield, along with Malawen Boulevard (now Quezon Avenue). The road was also renamed to Highway 54 and thus designated as Route 54. Due to the route number, there was a common misconception on that time that the avenue is 54 kilometers (34 mi) long. The present-day North EDSA section in Caloocan and Quezon City was referred to as Calle Samson (Samson Street), while its section in Pasay was also known as P. Lovina Street. It was later renamed as McArthur Boulevard in 1945, and after the independence of the Philippines from the United States in 1946, it became known as Avenida 19 de Junio (June 19 Avenue), after the birth date of national hero José Rizal.

In the 1950s, the northern end of the avenue was designated to its present terminus at Bonifacio Monument in Caloocan and its part west of it later becoming Samson Road, General San Miguel Street, and Letre Road. The avenue was widened from two to four lanes during this decade. Rizalists also wanted the avenue's name to remain 19 de Junio, while President Ramon Magsaysay wanted the avenue named after Rizal. Residents of Rizal province (to which most parts of Metro Manila belonged until 1975) wanted the avenue to be named after a Rizaleño: the historian, jurist and scholar named Epifanio de los Santos y Cristóbal, who was born in Malabon. The Philippine Historical Committee (now the National Historical Commission of the Philippines), the Philippine Historical Association, the Philippine Library Association, Association of university and College Professors, the Philippine China Cultural Association, and the Philippine National Historical Society, led by fellow Rizaleños Eulogio Rodriguez and Juan Sumulong, supported the renaming of Highway 54 to Epifanio de los Santos Avenue.

On April 7, 1959, de los Santos' birth anniversary, Republic Act No. 2140 was passed, renaming the avenue to honor him. Rapid urbanization in the 1960s and 1970s, particularly after the annexation of several Rizal towns to the newly established National Capital Region, marked the growth of the industrial centers along the road, and several other roads connected to the avenue, such as Ayala Avenue and McKinley Road in Makati.

Construction of EDSA continued into the 1970s, including the construction of the Guadalupe Bridge in the 1960s to connect its segments on the north and south banks of the Pasig River, with the Pasay segment being delayed due to right-of-way issues. During the rule of President Ferdinand Marcos, traffic jams along the avenue started to build up. Several interchanges were constructed to relieve congestion, including the Balintawak and Magallanes Interchanges. Later, with the implementation of the Metro Manila Arterial Road System in 1965, in order to complete the Circumferential Road 4 system, EDSA was extended from Taft Avenue to Roxas Boulevard, occupying parcels of land along the old F. Rein Street and Del Pan Avenue (P. Lovina Street) in Pasay. Until the mid-1980s, many parts of the highway still overlooked vast grassland and open fields.

=== The EDSA Revolution ===
By 1986, political opposition to the 20-year dictatorship of President Ferdinand Marcos mounted. In late February, high-ranking military officers including Defence Minister Juan Ponce Enrile and General Fidel Ramos, defected from the Marcos government and seized Camp Crame and Camp Aguinaldo, two military bases located across each other midway along EDSA. This triggered three days of peaceful demonstrations that became the People Power Revolution.

The majority of protesters were gathered at the gates of the two bases, along a stretch of EDSA between the commercial districts of Cubao in Quezon City and Ortigas Center in Mandaluyong. Over two million Filipino civilians, along with political, military, and religious groups led by Archbishop of Manila Cardinal Jaime Sin, succeeded in toppling President Marcos. Corazon Aquino, the widow of assassinated opposition senator Benigno Aquino Jr., was installed as president on the morning of February 25; by midnight, Marcos had escaped Malacañang Palace with his family, and was flying to exile in Hawaii.

=== Monuments ===
Several landmarks commemorate historical events that occurred along the avenue. At the intersection of EDSA and Ortigas Avenue is EDSA Shrine, a Catholic church capped by a bronze statue of the Blessed Virgin Mary as Our Lady of Peace. The shrine is dedicated to this Marian title in memory of the pious folk belief that in the 1986 Revolution, the Virgin Mary personally shielded the protesters – many of whom were peacefully praying and singing – as they faced government troops, tanks, and aircraft.

The People Power Monument (Tagalog: Monumento ng Lakás ng Bayan), consisting of a giant statue and esplanade, sits at the corner of EDSA and White Plains Avenue. Sculpted by Eduardo Castrillo and unveiled in 1993, the central sculpture depicts protesters standing upon a circular podium, all surrounding a woman (representing Ináng Bayan or the Motherland), reaching up to the heavens with her outstretched hands and broken shackles. A Philippine flag rises behind her, while a statue of Ninoy Aquino and an eternal flame stand on either side at its base. A huge, limestone-faced wall with grooves for ribbons in the national colors forms a backdrop to the scene. The surrounding pavement contains a row of flagstaffs, and is the center for protests and ceremonies held on the Revolution's anniversary of February 25.

Monuments dedicated to Andrés Bonifacio are situated at two locations along EDSA: the Balintawak Interchange and the avenue's terminus, the Monumento Circle. The monument at Balintawak, erected in 1971, replaced the old Cry of Balintawak Monument, a monument commemorating the Cry of Pugad Lawin and was transferred to the University of the Philippines Diliman campus in 1968. On the other hand, the Bonifacio Monument at Monumento was built in 1929 and unveiled in 1933.

=== Recent history ===
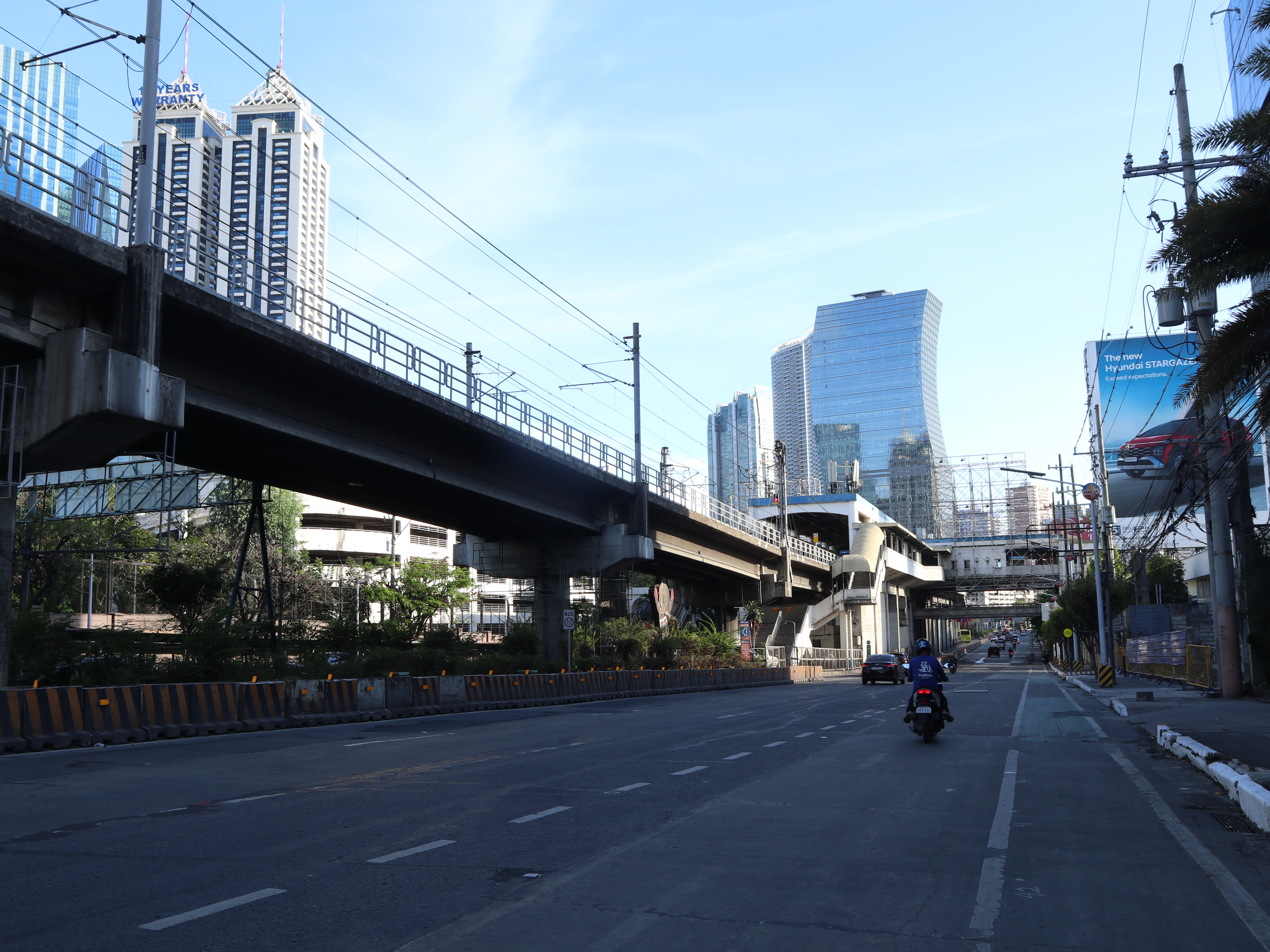
EDSA with Ortigas station in the background

After the People Power Revolution, the highway was commonly referred to as EDSA, and it was connected until SM Mall of Asia.

In 1997, construction began on the Manila Metro Rail Transit System, which runs the length of EDSA from North Avenue to Taft Avenue. It was opened under the administration of Joseph Estrada, the thirteenth President of the Philippines.

The Second EDSA Revolution, which also took place along the avenue, resulted in the peaceful ouster of President Estrada following his impeachment trial. He was succeeded by his Vice President, Gloria Macapagal Arroyo. She was sworn in on the terrace of EDSA Shrine by then-Chief Justice Hilario Davide Jr. at noon on January 20, 2001, several hours before Estrada and his family fled Malacañang Palace.

The EDSA III, which also took place along the avenue from April 25 to May 1 of the same year, resulted in violence when the supporters of former President Estrada attempted to storm the presidential palace and the military and police were ordered to use their arms to drive them back. Arroyo declared a state of rebellion because of the violence and prominent political personalities affiliated with Estrada were charged and arrested.

In 1999, the avenue was further extended from Roxas Boulevard to the future SM Mall of Asia on the Bay City Reclamation Project, where it now ends at the Globe Rotunda along J.W. Diokno Boulevard, a roundabout. The avenue was badly damaged in September 2006, when Typhoon Milenyo hit Manila.

In 2010, the LRT Line 1 (LRT-1) of the Manila Light Rail Transit System was extended from Monumento to Roosevelt (now Fernando Poe Jr.), ultimately transversing EDSA to end at the site of the current North Avenue MRT station.

On September 9, 2015, the Philippine National Police (PNP) deployed the Highway Patrol Group to support MMDA traffic constables easing traffic on congested segments of EDSA.

In September 2017, the construction of the North Triangle Common Station was started after numerous delays due to bureaucracy and location disputes. It will connect the LRT Line 1, MRT Line 3, MRT Line 7, and the Metro Manila Subway.

== EDSA Busway ==
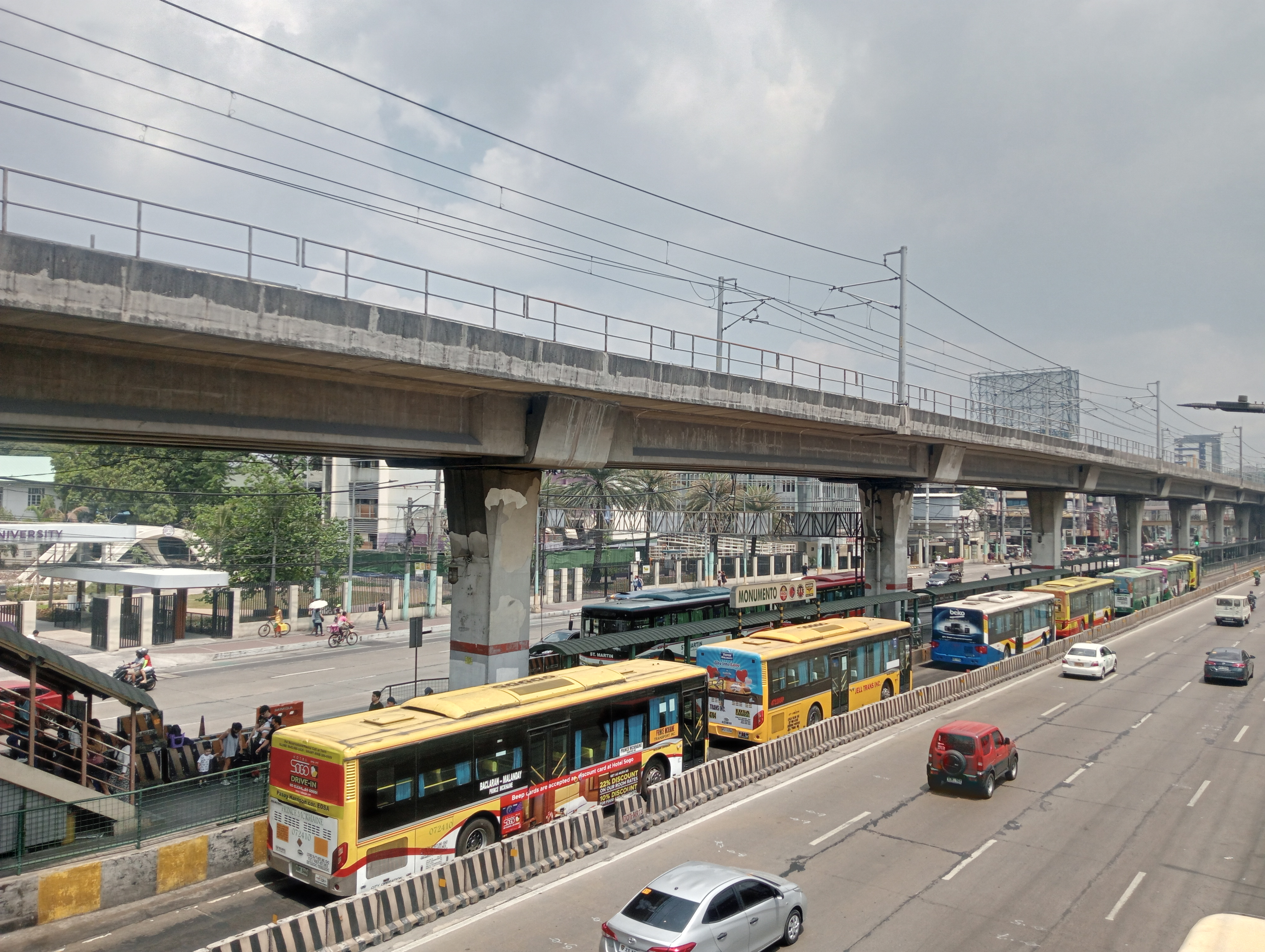
The Monumento stop of the EDSA Carousel in Caloocan

The EDSA Busway is a bus lane located on the innermost lanes of EDSA, used by the EDSA Carousel, specific P2P bus routes, and authorized government vehicles. It is a bus rapid transit (BRT) system with EDSA Carousel stops mostly on the avenue's median serving as the main bus route of the avenue. The system was put into place after almost all public and private transportation along EDSA was prohibited during the enhanced community quarantine in Luzon imposed during the start of the COVID-19 pandemic in March 2020. Interim operations of the BRT system began on July 1, 2020. Intended to be largely served by bus stops along the median, some stops are temporarily served by stations on the curbside.

The busway spans most of EDSA, with exclusive sections spanning the entirety of EDSA from Monumento to the Globe Rotunda. The lane is 3.3 to 3.5 m (10.8 to 11.5 ft) and is delineated by painted markings and concrete barriers. Some segments of the busway have openings for mixed traffic, particularly at intersections and interchanges along EDSA.

Prior to the establishment of the EDSA Carousel, the Department of Transportation proposed in 2017 to create two BRT lines in Metro Manila, which would be part of a Metro Manila Bus Rapid Transit System. EDSA would have had been designated as "Line 2: Central Corridor" and would have had 48.6 kilometers (30.2 mi) of segregated busways covering the length of the road. The agency planned to scrap the project by June 2018. However, this appeal was rejected and the Line 1 which will be built on Quezon Avenue, which passes EDSA, was later approved by the National Economic and Development Authority (NEDA) on November 2, 2018.

In 2019, Senator Win Gatchalian called for the approval of the BRT system as an alternate mode of transportation to the PNR Metro Commuter Line.

== Intersections ==
Intersections are numbered by kilometer post, with Rizal Park in Manila designated as kilometer zero.

Province	City/Municipality	km (Note: Sources:)	mi	Destinations	Notes
Caloocan		9.014– 9.209	5.601– 5.722	N1 (MacArthur Highway) / N150 (Rizal Avenue) – Valenzuela, Manila, Navotas	Roundabout with Bonifacio Monument Circle (Monumento). Northern terminus.
Caloocan				5th Street (B. Serrano)	Northbound access via U-turn slot
Caloocan				8th Street (A. De Jesus)	Unsignalized intersection. Access to 5th Avenue.
Caloocan				Biglang Awa Street	Northbound access via U-turn slot. Access to 10th Avenue.
Caloocan				Katipunan Street	Northbound entry only from the West Service Road
Quezon City		10.942– 11.270	6.799– 7.003	N160 (A. Bonifacio Avenue) / AH26 (NLEX) – Manila, Valenzuela, Bulacan, Pampanga, Bataan, Zambales, Baguio	Balintawak Interchange
Quezon City				N127 (Quirino Highway)	Northbound access only. Access to East Service Road running parallel to NLEX.
Quezon City				Kaingin Road / Howmart Road	Access from opposite direction via U-turn slot
Quezon City		12.425	7.721	Dario Bridge I over Dario Creek	
Quezon City		12.680	7.879	Culiat Bridge I over San Juan River	
Quezon City				N129 (Congressional Avenue) / Fernando Poe Jr. Avenue	Access from opposite directions via U-turn slot. Former traffic light intersection.
Quezon City				Corregidor Street / Bansalangin Street	Access from opposite directions via U-turn slot
Quezon City				N171 (West Avenue) / N173 (North Avenue)	Access to North Avenue from southbound and access to West Avenue from northbound via U-turn slot. Access to SM North EDSA and TriNoma.
Quezon City				Trinoma Access Road/Mindanao Avenue Extension	Northbound access only. Access to TriNoma.
Quezon City				Vertis North Access Road	Northbound access only. Access to Vertis North Complex.
Quezon City				North end of Quezon Avenue Flyover	
Quezon City		15.432– 16.536	9.589– 10.275	N170 (Quezon Avenue) – Manila, QMC	Traffic light intersection.
Quezon City				Panay Avenue	Southbound access only.
Quezon City				Mother Ignacia Avenue	Southbound access only. Access to the soon-be-demolished ABS-CBN Broadcasting Center, ELJ Communications Center, and St. Mary's College of Quezon City.
Quezon City				South end of Quezon Avenue Flyover	
Quezon City				Eugenio Lopez Drive	Southbound access only. Access to the soon-be-demolished ABS-CBN Broadcasting Center and ELJ Communications Center.
Quezon City				Scout Borromeo St / NIA South Road	Northbound and southbound access only. Site of the Kamuning Footbridge.
Quezon City				GMA Network Drive	Southbound access only. Access to GMA Network Center.
Quezon City				North end of Kamuning Flyover	
Quezon City				N172 (Timog Avenue) / N174 (East Avenue)	Traffic light intersection. Access to GMA Network Center and Land Transportation Office head office.
Quezon City				Kamias Road / Kamuning Road	Traffic light intersection. No left turn on both sides.
Quezon City				South end of Kamuning Flyover	
Quezon City		17.650	10.967	Lagarian Bridge I over Diliman Creek	
Quezon City				Ermin Garcia Street	Northbound/southbound access only. Access from opposite directions via U-turn slots (northbound via Kamuning U-turn slot and southbound via Aurora Boulevard U-turn slot.) Southbound side access to Ramon Magsaysay High School
Quezon City				New York Street	Northbound/southbound access only. Access from opposite direction via U-turn slots (northbound via Kamuning U-turn slot and southbound via Aurora Boulevard U-turn slot).
Quezon City				North end of Aurora Boulevard Underpass	
Quezon City				N180 / N59 (Aurora Boulevard) – Marikina, Rizal, Laguna, Quezon	Traffic light intersection. Access to Araneta Center. No left turn from northbound.
Quezon City				General Roxas Street	Northbound access only. Access to Araneta Center.
Quezon City				P.A. Bernardo Avenue	Southbound access only.
Quezon City				South end of Aurora Boulevard Underpass	
Quezon City				North end of P. Tuazon Underpass	
Quezon City				Mayor Ignacio Santos Diaz Street / General MacArthur Street	Northbound/southbound access only. Access from opposite directions via U-turn slots (northbound via Aurora Boulevard U-turn slot and southbound via P. Tuazon U-turn slot). Access to Araneta Center from northbound.
Quezon City				P. Tuazon Boulevard	Traffic light intersection. Access to Araneta Center. No lef turn from both directions.
Quezon City				South end of P. Tuazon Underpass	
Quezon City				North end of Santolan Flyover	
Quezon City				N185 (Bonny Serrano Avenue)	Traffic light intersection. Access to Camp Crame and Camp Aguinaldo.
Quezon City				South end of Santolan Flyover	
San Juan – Quezon City boundary				Annapolis Street	Southbound access only
San Juan – Mandaluyong – Quezon City boundary				Connecticut Street	Southbound access only. Access to Greenhills Shopping Center.
Mandaluyong – Quezon City boundary		20.778– 21.659	12.911– 13.458	White Plains Avenue	Northbound access only. Access to Camp Aguinaldo.
Mandaluyong – Quezon City boundary				North end of Ortigas Flyover	
Mandaluyong – Quezon City boundary				N60 (Ortigas Avenue) – Pasig, Rosario	Southbound ramp of EDSA–Ortigas Interchange. Access to Ortigas Center, Meralco Complex, and The Medical City.
Mandaluyong – Quezon City boundary				N60 / N184 (Ortigas Avenue)	Traffic light intersection under EDSA–Ortigas Interchange. Access to Robinsons Galleria and EDSA Shrine.
Mandaluyong – Quezon City boundary				N184 (Ortigas Avenue) – Greenhills, San Juan	Northbound ramp of EDSA–Ortigas Interchange. Access to La Salle Greenhills and Greenhills Shopping Center.
Mandaluyong – Quezon City boundary				South end of Ortigas Flyover	
Mandaluyong				Guadix Drive	Northbound access only. Access to Asian Development Bank.
Mandaluyong				Julia Vargas Avenue	Northbound access only. No right turn from Shaw Underpass. Access to SM Megamall.
Mandaluyong				North end of Shaw Underpass	
Mandaluyong				N141 (Shaw Boulevard) – Pasig, Manila	Traffic light intersection. Access to Shangri-La Plaza and Starmall EDSA-Shaw. No left turn from both sides of EDSA to Shaw Boulevard.
Mandaluyong				South end of Shaw Underpass	
Mandaluyong				Reliance Street	Northbound access only. Access to TV5 Media Center and United Laboratories (Unilab) head office.
Mandaluyong				Boni Avenue / Pioneer Street	Northbound and southbound access only.
Mandaluyong – Makati boundary		25.000– 25.163	15.534– 15.636	Guadalupe Bridge over the Pasig River	
Makati		25.163– 26.854	15.636– 16.686	J.P. Rizal Avenue	Guadalupe Interchange
Makati				Bernardino Street / P. Burgos Street	No access from opposite directions.
Makati				Orense Street	Northbound access only. Access to MMDA Metrobase.
Makati				Estrella Street	Exit from northbound via flyover ramp. Access to Power Plant Mall. Connection with Estrella–Pantaleon Bridge.
Makati		27.132	16.859	N190 (Kalayaan Avenue) – BGC	Southbound access via U-turn slot. Access to EDSA southbound via flyover ramp.
Makati				Kalayaan Flyover	Southbound entrance only from the Bonifacio Global City.
Makati				Kalayaan Flyover	Northbound entrance only from Gil Puyat Avenue.
Makati				N190 (Gil Puyat Avenue) / Buendia Avenue Extension	Northbound access to Buendia Avenue Extension accessible via U-turn slot at Ayala Avenue Intersection.
Makati				East end of Ayala Underpass	
Makati				Ayala Avenue / McKinley Road	Traffic light intersection. Access from Ayala Avenue either through flyover ramp or traffic light intersection. Access to Makati Central Business District, Ayala Center, Forbes Park, and Bonifacio Global City.
Makati				Arnaiz Avenue / Pasay Road	Traffic light intersection. Access to Dasmariñas Village.
Makati				West end of Ayala Underpass	
Makati				Chino Roces Avenue	Connects with U-turn to EDSA northbound, also route for vehicles which exceeds the height of the Chino Roces Avenue underpass.
Makati				N145 (Osmeña Highway) / AH26 (South Luzon Expressway) – Manila, Alabang, Laguna, Batangas, Quezon, Camarines Sur, Albay, Visayas	Magallanes Interchange. Access to STAR Tollway, Batangas City and Batangas International Port at the SLEX-STAR boundary signages after LISP Underpass and before Santo Tomas southbound exit and entrance, and Visayas through SLEX TR4 and TR5 passing the provinces of Quezon, Camarines Sur, Albay, and Sorsogon towards Matnog, and from northbound via at-grade roads.
Makati				Lapu-Lapu Avenue	Entrance to EDSA-Osmeña service road only
Makati				Magallanes Avenue	Traffic light intersection. Northbound entrance only.
Makati – Pasay boundary				Evangelista Street	Southbound only. Access via U-turn slot under Magallanes Interchange
Makati – Pasay boundary				P. Santos Street	Access via u-turn slot under Magallanes Interchange.
Pasay				C. Jose Street	Access via u-turn slot under Magallanes Interchange
Pasay		31.839	19.784	Malibay Bridge over Malibay Creek	
Pasay				Tramo Street	Southbound ramp, and northbound at-grade intersection. Access to EDSA southbound via U-turn slot under Magallanes Interchange.
Pasay				N170 (Taft Avenue)	Pasay Rotonda. Former southern terminus. No left turn from EDSA southbound, no left turn to EDSA northbound from Taft Avenue. Access to EDSA southbound via U-turn slot under Magallanes interchange.
Pasay				F.B. Harrison Street	Access to opposite direction provided by U-turn slot (northbound at P. Celle Street and southbound fronting The Heritage Hotel).
Pasay		32.285	20.061	AH26 / N61 (Roxas Boulevard) – Manila, Cavite, Batangas	Traffic light intersection. Access to Manila–Cavite Expressway at the end of Roxas Boulevard, and opposite direction formerly provided by U-turn slot. South end of C-4 concurrency. Change from N1/AH26 to unnumbered highway. Former southern terminus (1965–1999). End of DPWH maintenance and start of Philippine Reclamation Authority (PRA) maintenance. (Note: The Philippine Reclamation Authority (PRA) maintains a short section of the avenue from Roxas Boulevard to its southern terminus at SM Mall of Asia, and is unnumbered since it is not part of the avenue's original construction as such, serving as an extension to its DPWH-maintained older existing portion from Bonifacio Monument to the said boulevard, with the MMDA still holding the extension's traffic management.)
Pasay				Macapagal Boulevard	Traffic light intersection. Access to NAIA Expressway (NAIAX), Seaside Drive, Pacific Avenue, and Manila–Cavite Expressway (CAVITEX).
Pasay				Sunrise Drive	No access to opposite directions.
Pasay				J.W. Diokno Boulevard	Roundabout with SM Mall of Asia Globe Rotunda. Current southern terminus (1999–present). Serves SM Mall of Asia and surrounding areas. End of PRA maintenance and MMDA traffic management. Access to Seaside Drive, Pacific Avenue, and Manila–Cavite Expressway (CAVITEX).
1.000 mi = 1.609 km; 1.000 km = 0.621 mi: Incomplete access; Route transition

== Landmarks ==
This list is from the Bonifacio Monument in the north to MOA Globe and SM Mall of Asia in the south.

- Bonifacio Monument
- Manila Central University
- La Verdad Christian College Caloocan campus
  - DWAO-TV
  - DWNU
  - DZXQ
- Bonifacio Memorial Elementary School
- Balintawak Interchange
  - North Luzon Expressway
  - Metro Manila Skyway
- Balintawak market
- Balintawak station
- Dario Bridge (San Juan River)
- Fernando Poe Jr. station
- Quezon City Academy
- SM North EDSA
- Philippine College of Surgeons
- Paramount Building
  - DZRV-AM
- Trinoma
- North Avenue station
- Vertis North
  - Solaire Resort North
- United Church of Christ in the Philippines
- Department of the Interior and Local Government
  - National Police Commission
- The Skysuites Tower
- Eton Centris
- Quezon Avenue station
- National Government Center
  - National Printing Office
  - National Irrigation Administration
  - Philippine Crop Insurance Corporation
  - Department of Public Works and Highways Bureau of Research and Standards
- Manuel L. Quezon University
- GMA–Kamuning station
- GMA Network
  - GMA Network Center
    - DZBB-TV
    - DZBB-AM
    - DWLS
- Bernardo Park
- Lagarian Bridge (Diliman Creek)
- Mega Q Mart
- Ramon Magsaysay (Cubao) High School
- Araneta City
  - Farmers Plaza
  - Farmers Market
  - Expo Centro
  - Embassy of Colombia
- Araneta Center–Cubao MRT station
- Samson College of Science and Technology
- Camp Aguinaldo
- Camp Crame
- Santolan–Annapolis station
- Primex Tower
- People Power Monument
- Department of Migrant Workers
- Ortigas Interchange
- Ortigas station
- Ortigas Center
  - EDSA Shrine
  - Robinsons Galleria
  - Saint Pedro Poveda College
  - SM Megamall
    - Mega Tower
  - Shang Place
    - Edsa Shangri-La
    - Shangri-La Plaza
- Starmall EDSA Shaw
  - Advanced Media Broadcasting System
- Shaw Boulevard station
- Greenfield District
- Paragon Plaza
  - DWBL-AM
  - DWJM
  - DWLL
  - DWOW
  - DWRT-FM
  - DWSS-AM
  - DWTM
- Boni station
- Philippine Red Cross National Headquarters
- Guadalupe Bridge (Pasig River)
- Guadalupe station
- Guadalupe Commercial Complex
- San Carlos Seminary
- Global City Innovative College
- Metropolitan Manila Development Authority
- Kalayaan Flyover
- Buendia MRT station
- McKinley Exchange Corporate Center
- Ayala Center
  - One Ayala
  - SM Makati
  - Dusit Thani Manila
- Ayala station
- Magallanes station
- EDSA PNR station
- Magallanes Interchange
  - Metro Manila Skyway
  - Osmeña Highway
  - South Luzon Expressway
- Malibay Bridge (Estero de Tripa de Galina)
- Tramo Street
- Taft Avenue Intersection
  - Metro Point Mall
  - Taft Avenue station
- STI College Pasay EDSA
- Pasay Auto Mall
- Roxas Boulevard Intersection and Flyover
  - San Juan de Dios Educational Foundation
  - Shell EDSA Heritage
  - Mitsubishi Manila Bay
  - Heritage Hotel Manila
  - ABS-CBN Corporation and Radio Philippines Network (RPN) Former Headquarters
    - Kanlaon Condominium
- Bay City
  - Le Parc
  - Macapagal Boulevard Intersection
    - DD Meridian Park
      - DoubleDragon Plaza
    - MetPark
      - Met Live
    - Hotel101-Manila
  - SM Central Business Park
    - Ice Tower
    - Shell Residences
    - Sea Residences
    - MOA Globe
    - SM Mall of Asia

== Future developments ==
=== Proposed interchanges ===
An overpass over the North Avenue–West Avenue Intersection and Mindanao Avenue Junction in the Triangle Park and a flyover over Congressional Avenue–Fernando Poe Jr. Avenue intersection in Muñoz are already approved and was slated to begin construction in 2013. As of 2020, the project is currently on hold.

=== Proposed renaming ===
On October 13, 2011, Representative Rene Relampagos (Bohol–1st) filed House Bill (HB) No. 5422, proposing to rename Epifanio de los Santos Avenue as "Corazon Aquino Avenue." According to Relampagos, the idea to rename EDSA after Aquino, who led the 1986 People Power, was conceptualized in the aftermath of her death. However, the measure only went as far as referral to the House Committee on Public Works and Highways on November 14, 2011.

=== Construction of EDSA-Taft flyover ===
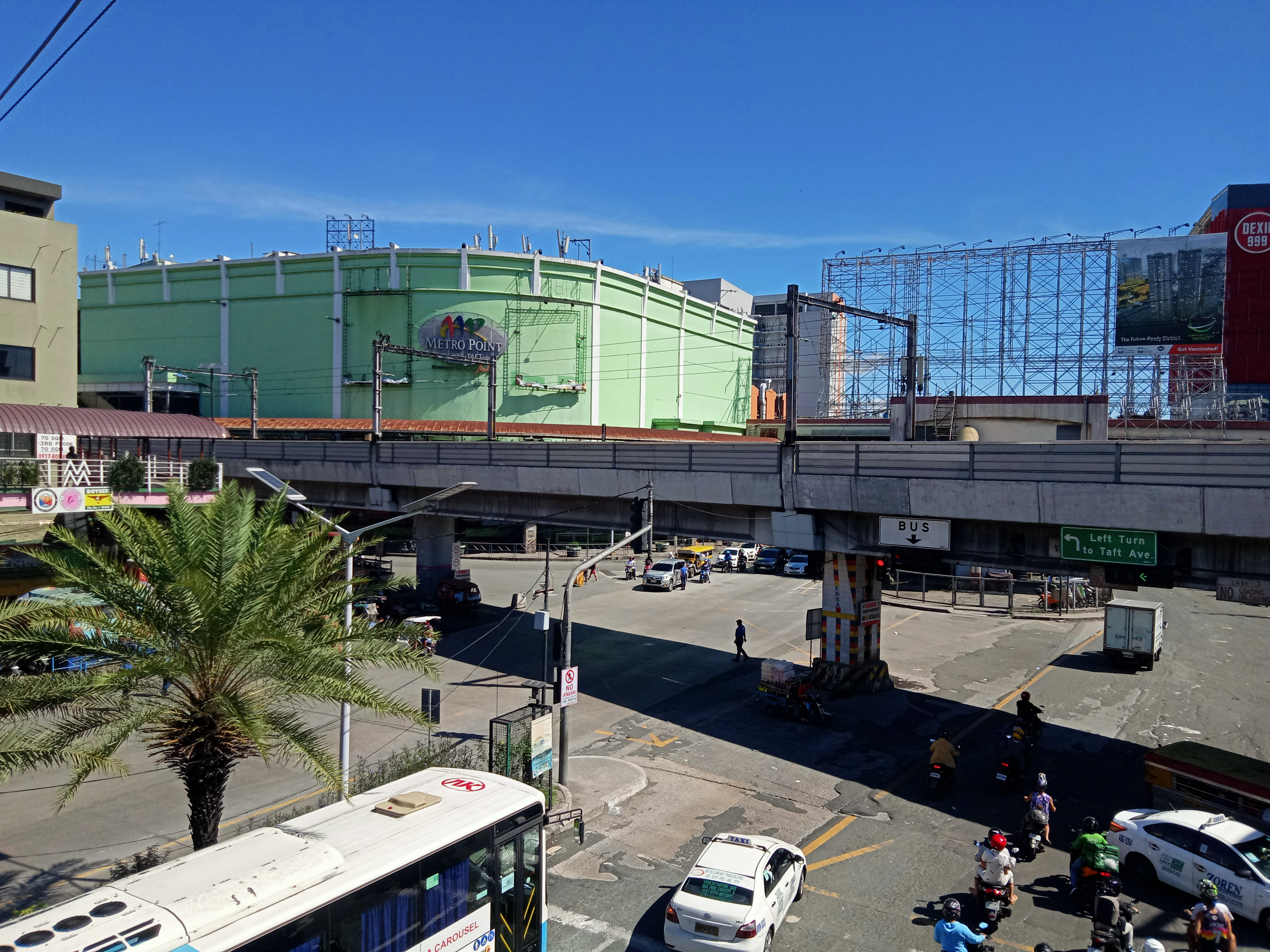
Intersection of EDSA and Taft Avenue, also known as Pasay Rotonda, the proposed site for the EDSA–Taft flyover

On April 2, 2013, then-President Benigno Aquino III gave the go-signal for the construction of a flyover at the perennially traffic-choked corner of EDSA and Taft Avenue in Pasay.

The project is estimated to cost ₱2.8 billion, with the flyover extending to about 1.4 kilometers (0.87 mi) each side and it will take one and a half years to complete the project.

=== Proposed road pricing scheme ===
With support from Singapore, the Metropolitan Manila Development Authority proposed the implementation of congestion pricing, based on the Electronic Road Pricing scheme on Singapore, on EDSA to alleviate traffic congestion, along with providing alternate routes and opening some gated community roads. Implementation is set for 2018, but Rene Santiago, a transport engineer and planner, criticized the proposal because it may only worsen congestion, along with the numerous intersections and side streets along EDSA.

The congestion pricing proposal was revived again in 2025 by the MMDA, believing that improvements and projected capacity increases in the MRT-3 would allow them to more feasibly introduce congestion pricing and high-occupancy vehicle lanes.

=== Proposed shared bicycle-motorcycle lanes ===
On August 18, 2023, the MMDA proposed converting the bicycle lanes on EDSA exclusive to bicycles into shared lanes for bicycles and motorcycles, claiming that the EDSA bicycle lanes are "underutilized", and also proposed plans to build an elevated walkway and bikeway on EDSA from Guadalupe to Cubao. A preliminary feasibility study will be conducted within the week, with a stakeholders' meeting with cyclists and motorcycle riders taking place on August 29, 2023.

The proposal was criticized by sustainable transport advocates, who claimed that the proposed scheme would compromise the safety of cyclists and argued instead to carve an exclusive motorcycle lane from the regular lanes. The Department of Transportation will have the final say on the MMDA's proposal, which has jurisdiction over the EDSA bicycle lanes.

The MMDA, together with the DILG, revived its proposal for shared bicycle and motorcycle lanes again in 2025, with the latter citing the need for a dedicated motorcycle lane.

=== Rehabilitation ===
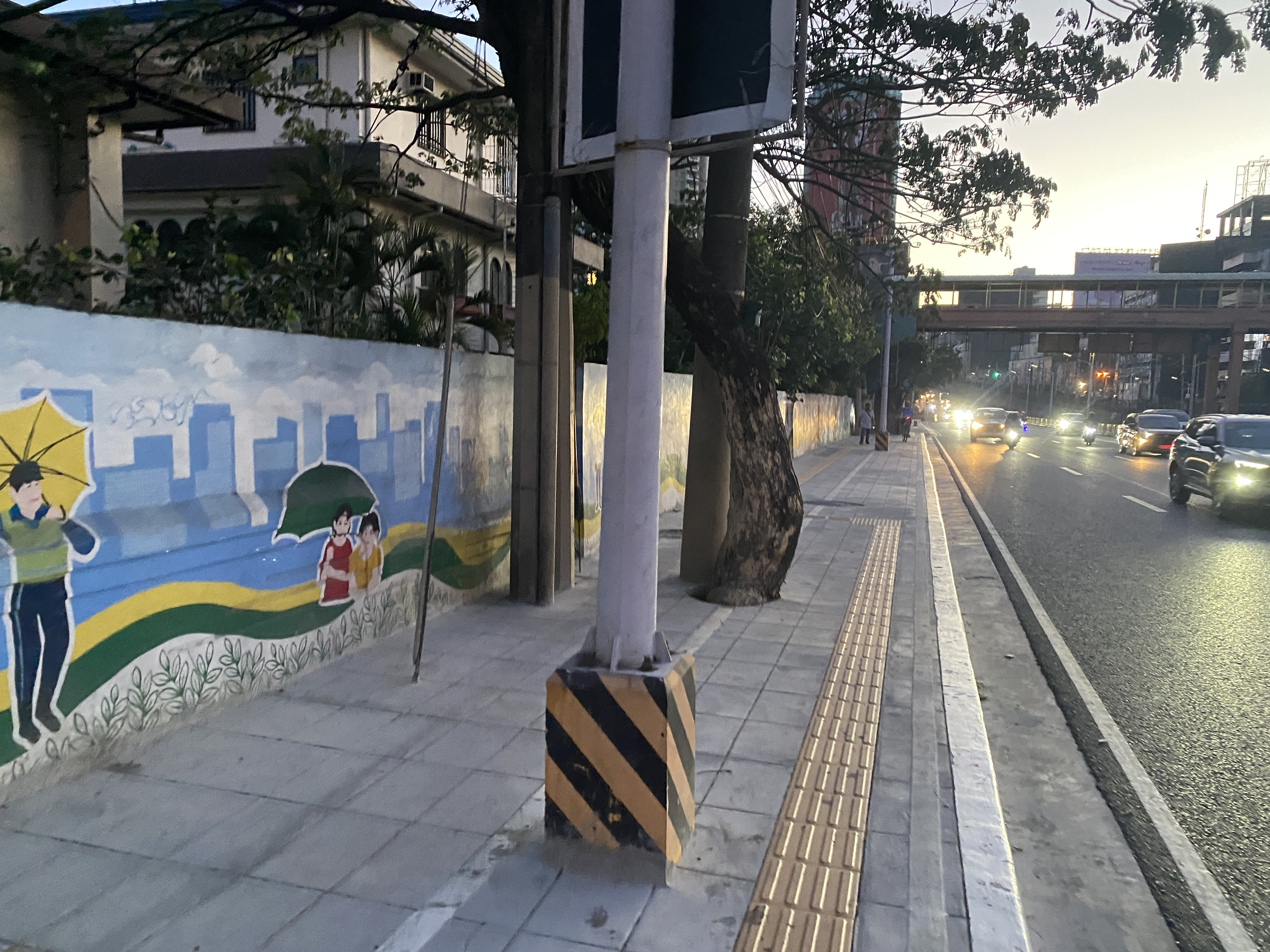
Rehabilitated sidewalk along EDSA southbound in Guadalupe Viejo, Makati

EDSA is currently undergoing a rehabilitation project initiated by the Department of Public Works and Highways. The project, slated to originally begin on June 16, 2025, involves phased road repairs, drainage upgrades, and the application of durable asphalt, starting with the segment between Pasay and Shaw Boulevard in Mandaluyong. The project is part of the broader Build Better More infrastructure program under the administration of President Bongbong Marcos It is also planned to be completed ahead of the 2026 ASEAN Summits, which will be hosted by the Philippines. However, on June 1, 2025, the project was temporarily suspended by President Marcos Jr. to search for a "better way." It would later be pushed back to 2026, citing the rainy season during the second half of 2025 as the cause. The project was restarted, which will now only include concrete reblocking of some sections, asphalt overlaying, and rehabilitation of both sidewalks and bike lanes (which is shared with the sidewalk). It finally commenced on December 24, 2025, with Phase 1 of the project originally to be completed on May 31, 2026, covering Roxas Boulevard to Orense being "ahead of schedule".

== Protests ==
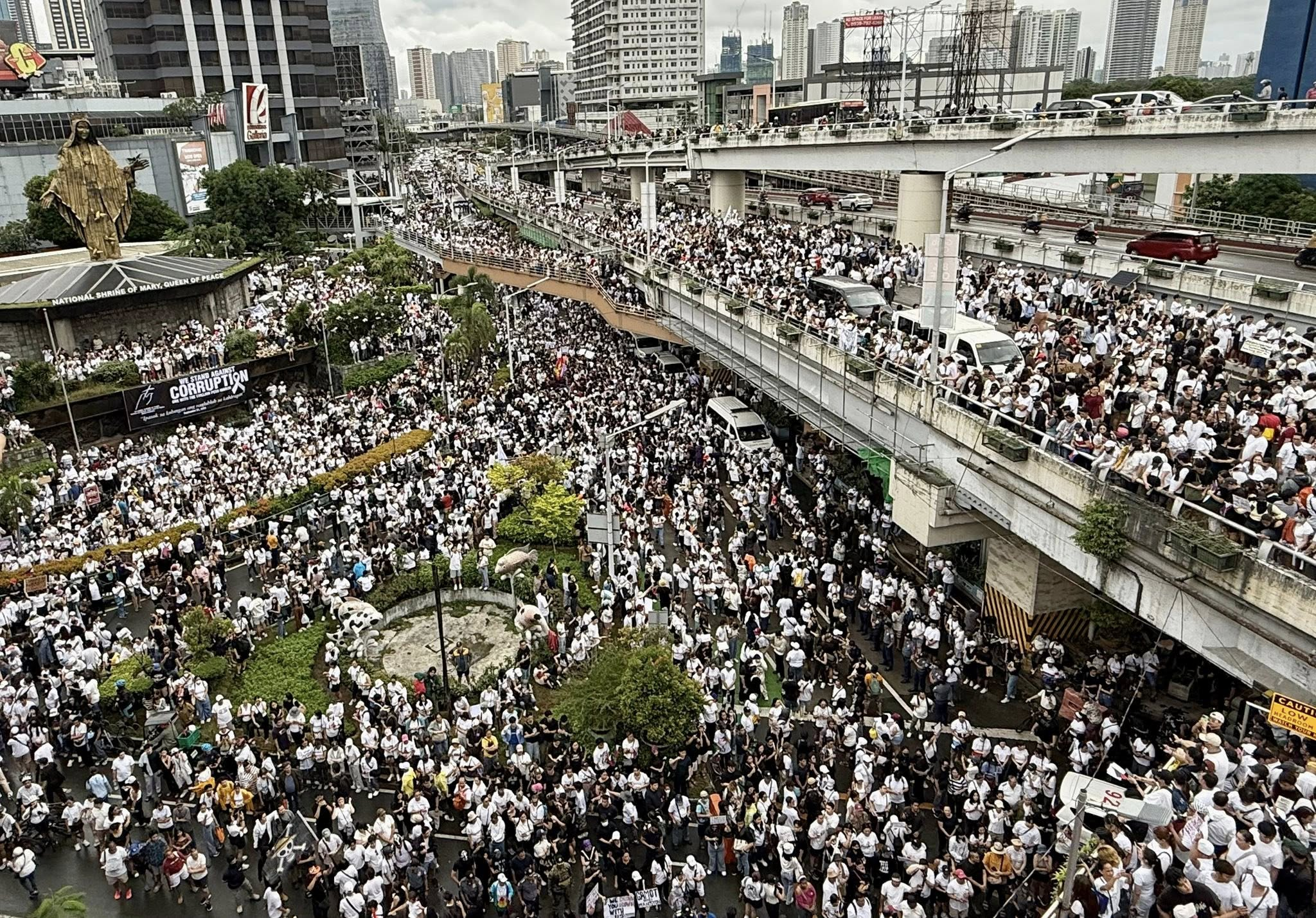
The Trillion Peso March at the vicinity of EDSA Shrine on September 21, 2025

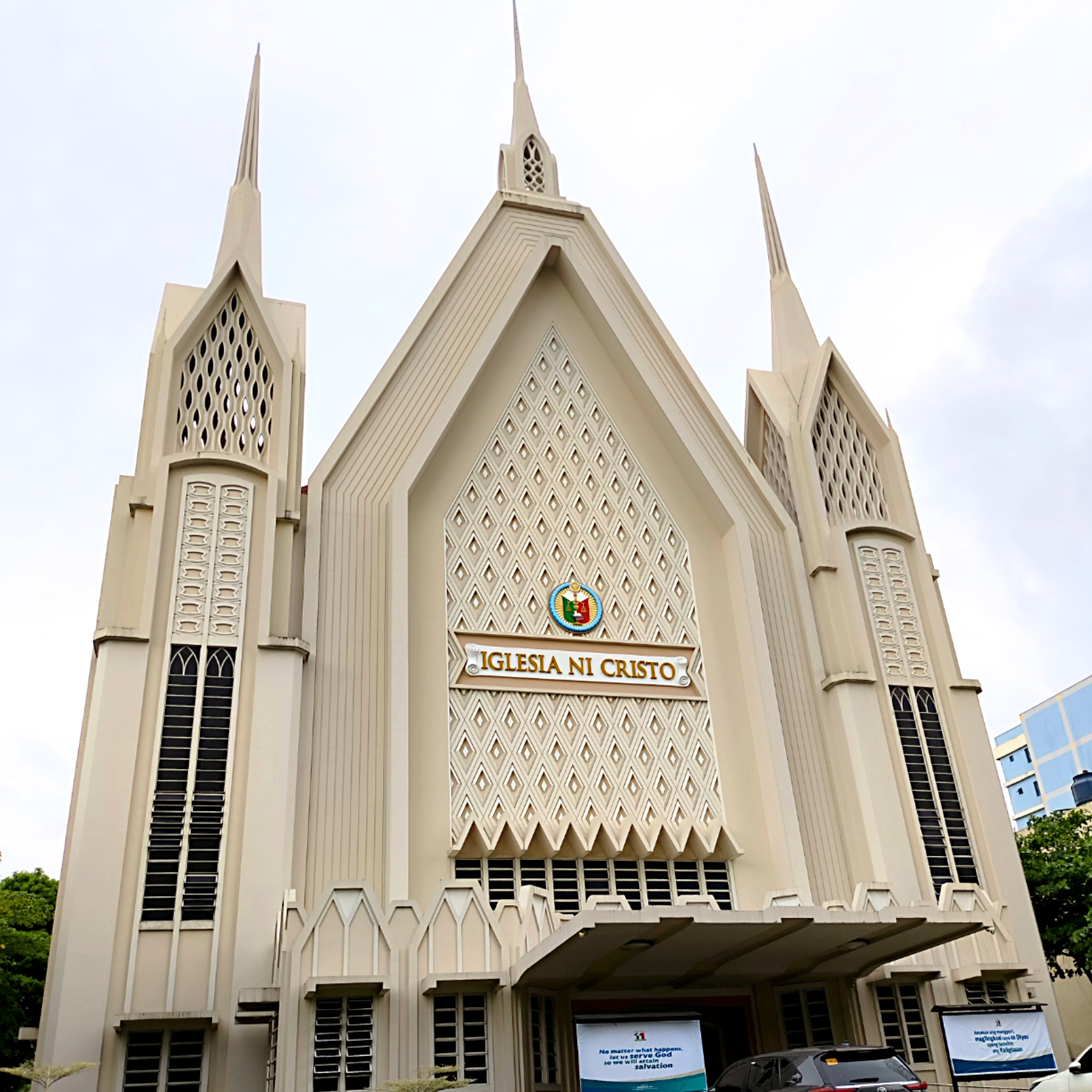
The Iglesia Ni Cristo (INC) Lokal ng Bago Bantay, completed on December 4, 1964, is currently the only INC chapel located along EDSA.

EDSA is frequently used as a protest site.

- In August 2012, the Catholic Church assembled a mass rally on EDSA to oppose the Reproductive Health Bill.
- On September 11, 2013, a prayer vigil called EDSA Tayo was held at the EDSA Shrine, where around 500–700 people were gathered to call for the abolition of the Priority Development Assistance Fund.
- On February 25, 2015, various groups held a demonstration along EDSA to demand that President Benigno Aquino III stand down.
- On August 27–31, 2015, Iglesia ni Cristo adherents staged demonstrations along EDSA near SM Megamall, calling on then-Justice Secretary Leila De Lima to focus on issues such as the Mamasapano clash instead of a case filed by former INC minister Isaias Samson Jr. against Church leaders.
- On November 30, 2016, an anti-Marcos protest was held in the People Power Monument due to the burial of Ferdinand Marcos at the Libingan ng mga Bayani.
- On November 5, 2017, critics of the Rodrigo Duterte administration attended a Mass at the EDSA Shrine to protest against extrajudicial killings in the country.
- On February 22, 2018, groups gathered at People Power Monument to hold a prayer vigil to show their opposition against constitutional reform.
- On February 22, 2020, demonstrators gathered at the People Power Monument to call on President Rodrigo Duterte to resign from office.
- On September 21, 2025, protests were held at the People Power Monument and EDSA Shrine, with thousands gathering for the Trillion Peso March to call for government transparency and accountability amidst the flood control projects controversy.
- On June 28, 2026, thousands of protesters marched from the EDSA Shrine to the People Power Monument for the "White Ribbon March," a non-partisan, faith-based demonstration calling for government accountability and electoral reforms.
- On June 30, 2026, members of the Iglesia ni Cristo (INC) staged a surprise anti-corruption protests at the People Power Monument to oppose an impending plunder case against INC adherent Senator Rodante Marcoleta over his 2025 senatorial campaign funds. Although the Metropolitan Manila Development Authority (MMDA) confirmed the rally had proceeded without a permit, organizers subsequently secured an official permit from the Quezon City government for the continuation of the rally on July 1.

The avenue is also used in political campaigns by several politicians, particularly those who had been involved in the EDSA People Power Revolution such as Joseph Estrada and Benigno Aquino III.

== In popular culture ==
EDSA was also featured in the film The Bourne Legacy. Portions of the road from Magallanes Interchange to Taft Avenue were featured in a car chase wherein Aaron Cross, played by Jeremy Renner, jumps from the Taft Avenue footbridge to a plying bus.

Due to its notorious traffic congestion, Programang EDSA, a weekday rush hour radio program that aired on 90.7 Love Radio Manila in the early evening, is named after the avenue.

Pablo of SB19 wrote and performed the song "EDSA" that describes the experience of driving along this avenue especially during rush hour.
