= Harrison Street =

Road in Metro Manila, Philippines

Coordinates: 14°32′55″N 120°59′35″E

- F.B. Harrison Street
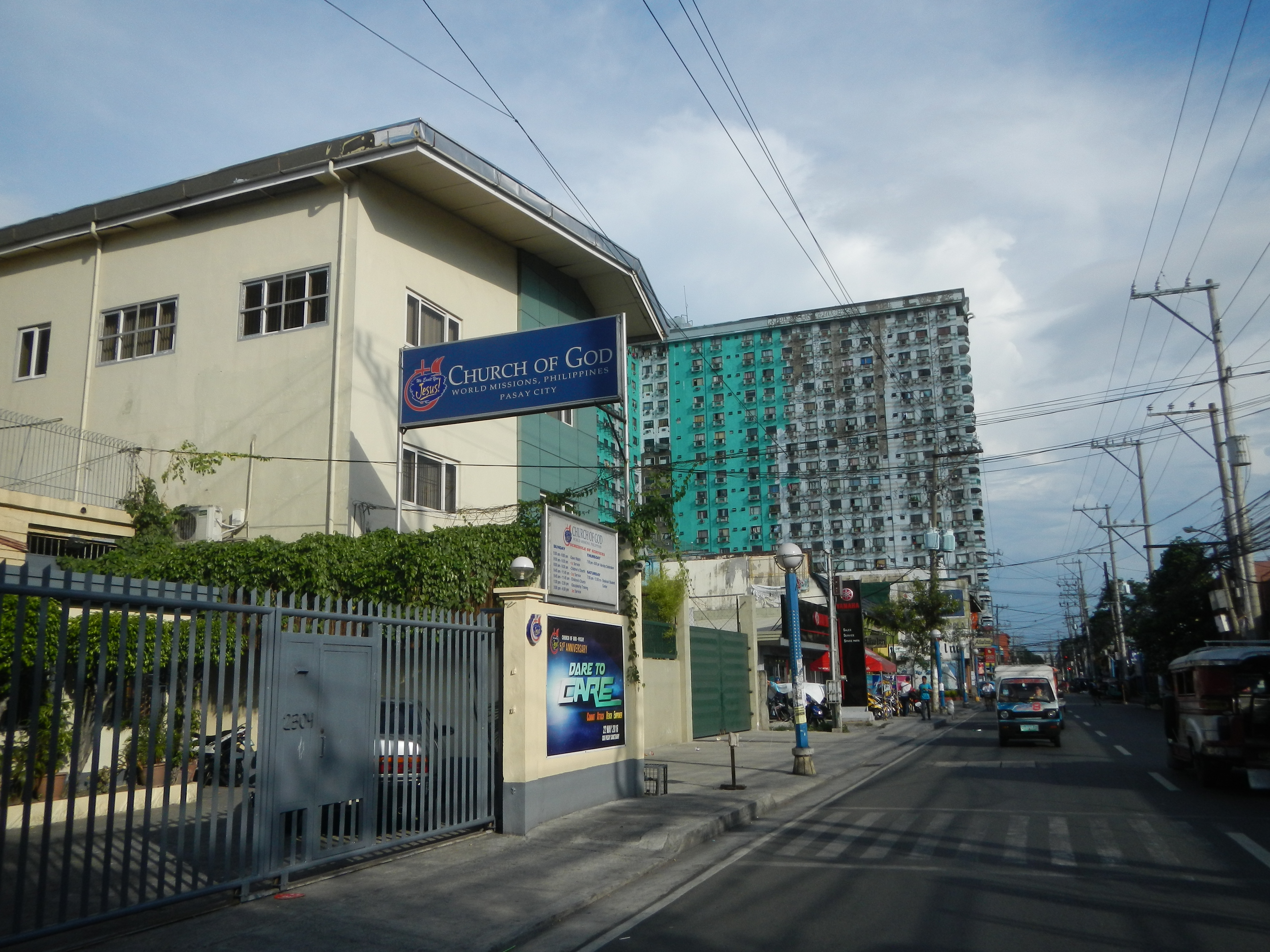
- Harrison Avenue near the Church of God
- Interactive map of Harrison Street
- Former names: Calle Real; Calle San Lucas
- Namesake: Francis Burton Harrison
- Length: 3.2 km (2.0 mi)
- Location: Manila, Parañaque, and Pasay
- North end: Pablo Ocampo Street and Mabini Street in Malate, Manila
- Major junctions: N190 (Gil Puyat Avenue); Arnaiz Avenue; AH 26 (N1) (EDSA)
- South end: Taft Avenue Extension, Redemptorist Road, and Elpidio Quirino Avenue in Baclaran, Parañaque

Francis Burton Harrison Street, commonly known as F. B. Harrison Street or simply Harrison Street, is a major north-south collector road in Pasay, western Metro Manila, Philippines. It is a four-lane undivided arterial running parallel to Roxas Boulevard to the west and Taft Avenue to the east, from Pasay's border with Malate district in the north to Baclaran in Parañaque in the south. The street is named for U.S. Governor-General of the Philippines Francis Burton Harrison.

== Street description ==
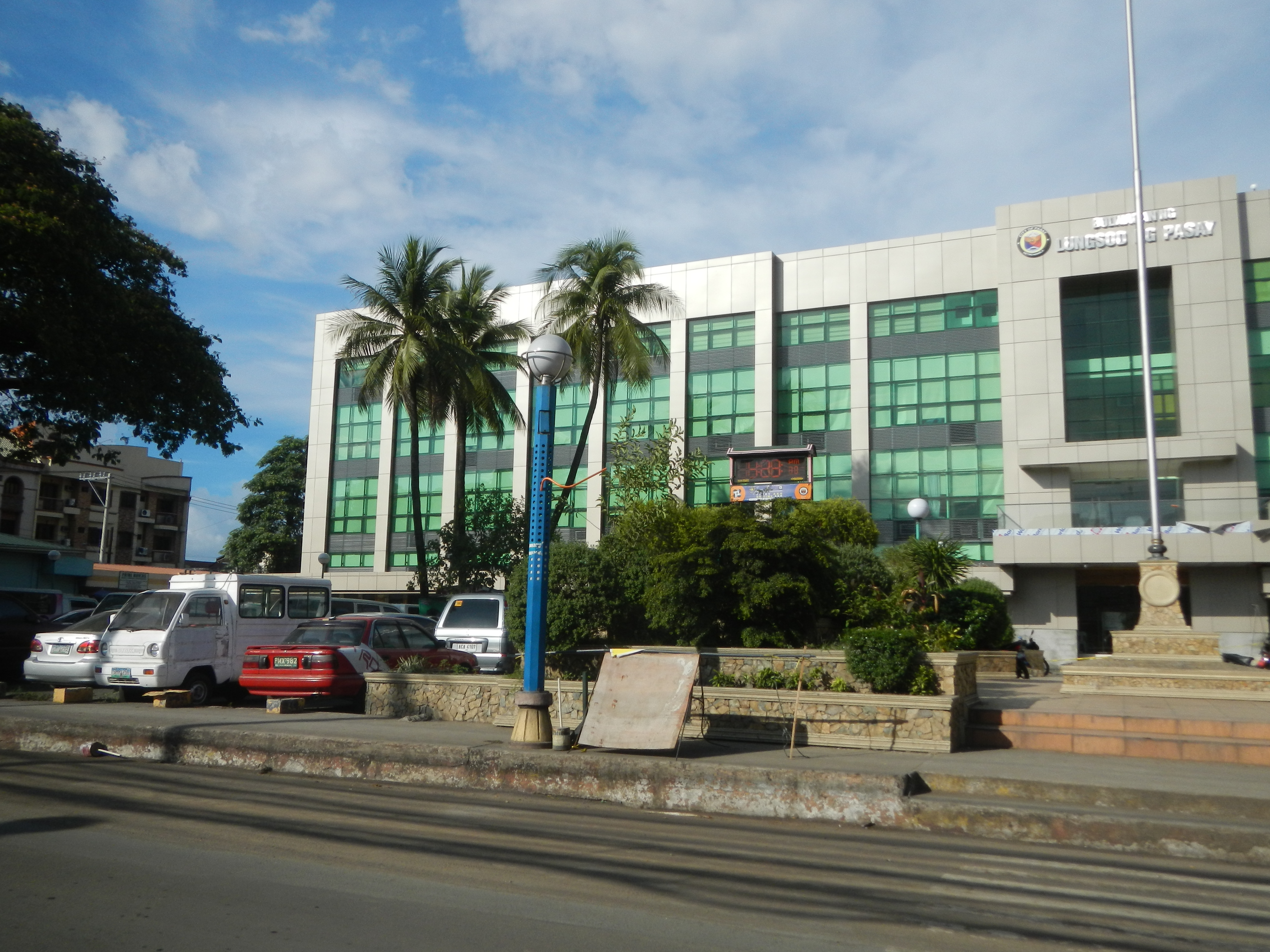
Pasay City Hall on Harrison Avenue

Harrison Street has a right-of-way width of approximately 25 meters (82 ft). It is a public transportation or medium-occupancy vehicle corridor frequented by intra-metropolitan jeepneys and mega-taxis. This condition gives Harrison Street its relatively slow-moving, congested, and highly pedestrian character.

== History ==
Harrison Street forms part of an old Spanish coastal highway that linked the Province of Manila to La Laguna and other southern provinces. It was called Calle Real or Camino Real (Spanish for "royal street") and spanned from Ermita to Muntinlupa. Presently, only the Las Piñas and Muntinlupa section is called Calle Real or Real Street as an alternative name for the road. The Pasay portion, also historically known as Calle San Lucas, is renamed Calle F.B. Harrison, while those of the City of Manila and Parañaque have been renamed to Del Pilar Street and Quirino Avenue, respectively. It was also one of the right-of-way alignments of tranvía that existed until 1945.

== Intersections ==
Province	City/Municipality	km	mi	Destinations	Notes
Parañaque				Taft Avenue Extension; R-2 / Redemptorist Road	Southern terminus; continues south as Elpidio Quirino Avenue.
Pasay				Aguarra Street	
Pasay				Russel Avenue	
Pasay				Ortigas Street	
Pasay				Cuneta Avenue	
Pasay				AH 26 (26) (EDSA); C-4	Access to opposite direction via u-turn slot
Pasay				Ignacio Street	One-way road
Pasay				Galvez Street	
Pasay				Arnaiz Avenue	Traffic light intersection
Pasay				Villaruel Street	One-way entrance and exit
Pasay				N190 (Gil Puyat Avenue)	Access to opposite direction via u-turn slot
Pasay				San Juan Street	
Pasay				Dapitan Street / Suerte Street	
Manila				Pablo Ocampo Street	Traffic light intersection, southern terminus. Continues north as Mabini Street
1.000 mi = 1.609 km; 1.000 km = 0.621 mi: Concurrency terminus; Incomplete access
