= Jose W. Diokno Boulevard =

Major road in Bay City, Metro Manila, Philippines

Coordinates: 14°32′30″N 120°58′59″E

J.W. Diokno Boulevard
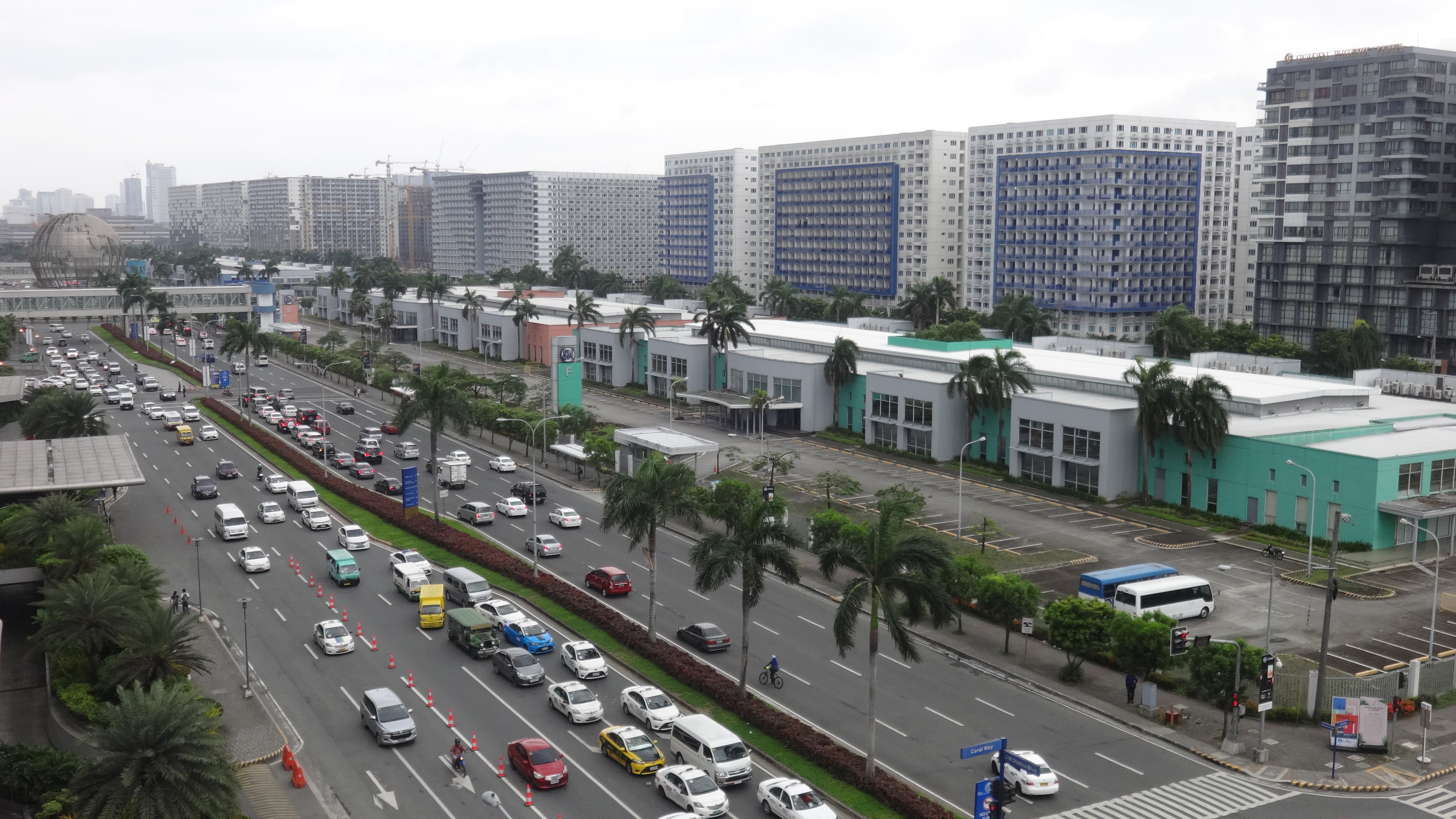
- SM Corporate Offices on Jose W. Diokno Boulevard at the Mall of Asia Complex
- Interactive map of J.W. Diokno Boulevard
- Former name: Bay Boulevard
- Namesake: Jose W. Diokno
- Maintained by: Philippine Reclamation Authority (Note: Philippine Reclamation Authority maintains Jose W. Diokno Boulevard's section from the Redemptorist Channel to Asean Avenue in Parañaque.) and Department of Public Works and Highways – South Manila District Engineering Office (Note: The Department of Public Works and Highways through its South Manila District Engineering Office maintains Jose W. Diokno Boulevard's national tertiary road section from Gil Puyat Avenue Extension to J.W. Diokno Bridge in Pasay.)
- Length: 4.38 km (2.72 mi)
- North end: Gil Puyat Avenue Extension / Zoilo Hilario Street / Atang Dela Rama Street in Pasay
- Major junctions: Seaside Boulevard; Epifanio de los Santos Avenue; Coral Way; Bradco Avenue; Asean Avenue; New Seaside Drive
- South end: Pacific Avenue in Parañaque

J.W. Diokno Boulevard, officially Jose W. Diokno Boulevard, is a 4.38-kilometer (2.72 mi) long major collector road that runs north–south along the eastern perimeter of the SM Mall of Asia complex and parallel to Macapagal Boulevard in Bay City, Metro Manila, Philippines. It provides access from the Cultural Center of the Philippines Complex (CCP Complex) and Roxas Boulevard north to the shopping and lifestyle hub by Manila Bay in Pasay. Motorists use the highway as the less congested alternative route from Manila to the Bay City vis-à-vis its parallel partner road on Macapagal Boulevard. It also connects to Entertainment City further south in Parañaque, and unlike Macapagal Boulevard, it is situated along the coastline overlooking Manila Bay.

The 8-lane median-divided boulevard was formerly known as Bay Boulevard. It was renamed in 2007 after Jose Wright Diokno, the founding chair of the Commission on Human Rights, Free Legal Assistance Group (FLAG) founder, and former Filipino senator. The road was originally planned to stretch up to the present site of the Manila–Cavite Expressway's Parañaque toll plaza. It was constructed by the Philippine Reclamation Authority and fully completed in 2011.

== Route description ==
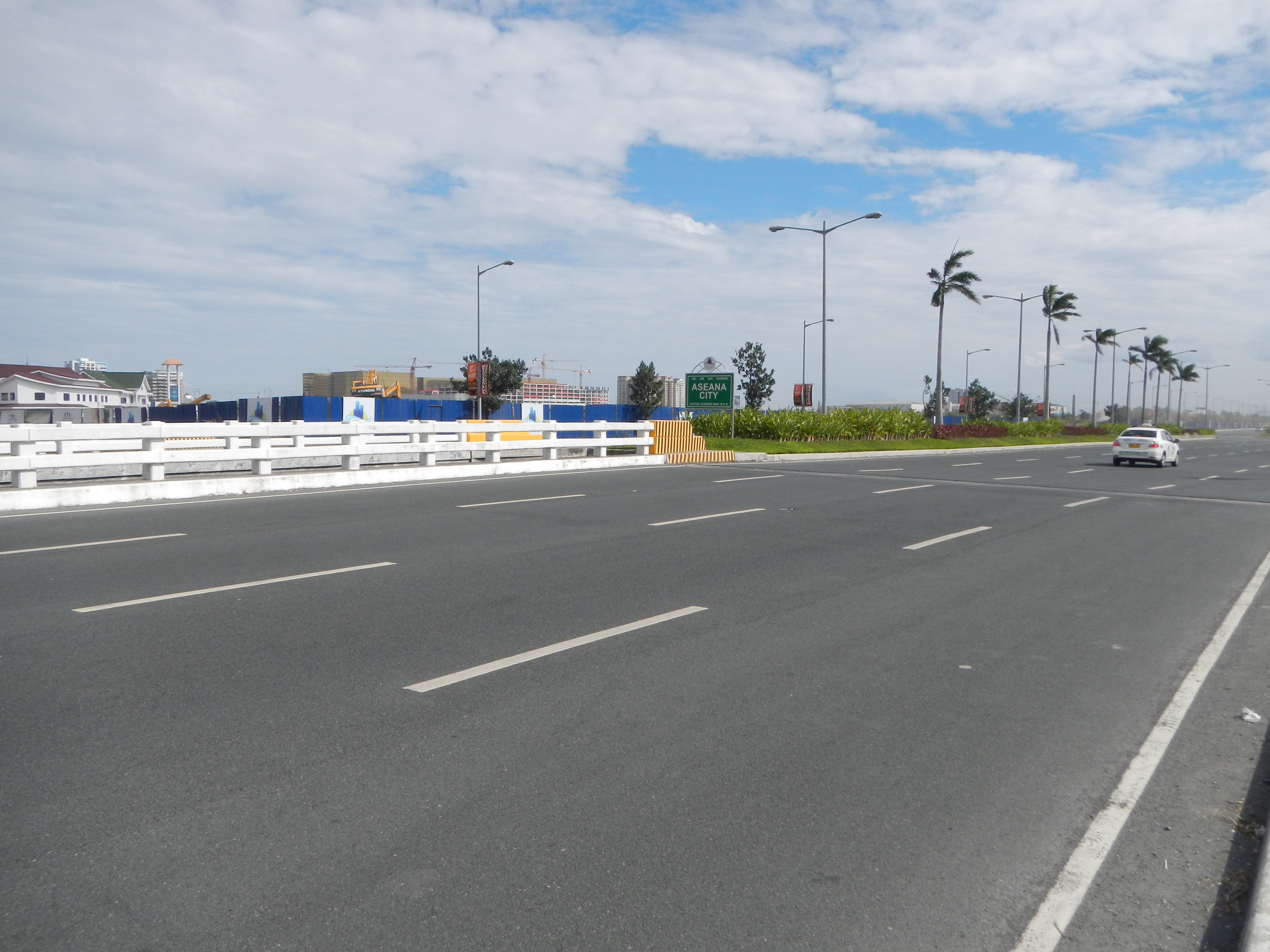
On the southbound lane of Jose W. Diokno Boulevard looking towards Entertainment City

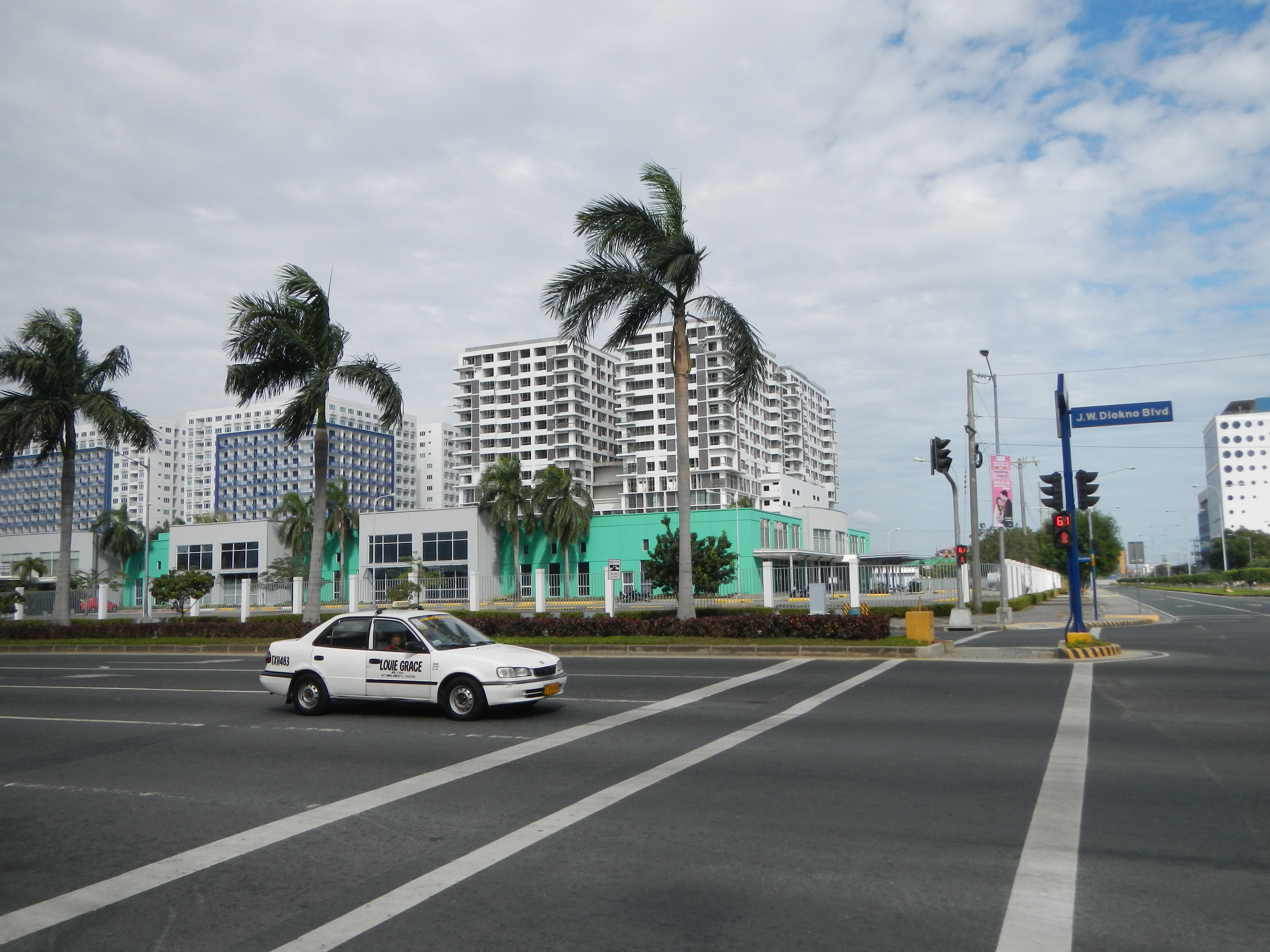
Jose W. Diokno Boulevard at the intersection of Coral Way

Jose W. Diokno Boulevard commences at the intersection with Gil Puyat Avenue Extension and Zoilo Hilario Street, near the Manila Film Center, as a logical continuation of Atang Dela Rama Street.

The 100-meter (330 ft) J.W. Diokno Bridge carries the boulevard across the Libertad Channel, connecting the CCP-FCA Island with Central Business Park 1-A. From there, it becomes a north–south road running for 1.28 kilometers (0.80 mi) across the SM Mall of Asia complex. This section is dominated by the Globe Rotunda, the terminus of Epifanio de los Santos Avenue (EDSA).

After crossing the Redemptorist Channel, the boulevard enters the mixed-use developments of Aseana City and Entertainment City in Parañaque. It runs for 1.65 kilometers (1.03 mi) from Redemptorist to Asia World City (Asiaworld), intersecting with Asean Avenue, where the boulevard then becomes part of the NAIA Expressway (NAIAX) At-Grade section. It then comes to a roundabout fronting Westside City Resorts World, where it continues to the southwest. It then intersects New Seaside Road, where NAIAX At-Grade continues and leaves the boulevard. It passes through the Okada Manila development before entering Marina Asiaworld City, ending at its southern terminus at or near Pacific Avenue.

== Intersections ==
Intersections are numbered by kilometer post, with Rizal Park in Manila designated as kilometer 0. The kilometer count is discontinuous.

Province	City/Municipality	km	mi	Destinations	Notes
Parañaque				Seaside Drive	Traffic light intersection. Southern terminus. Access to Seaside Drive, Pacific Avenue, and Manila–Cavite Expressway (CAVITEX).
Parañaque				Asean Avenue (Aseana Avenue)	Traffic light intersection.
Parañaque				A. Luz Drive	Northbound access only.
Parañaque				B. Cabrera Drive	Northbound access only.
Parañaque				Bradco Avenue	Traffic light intersection.
Parañaque				Valera Drive	Northbound exit only.
Redemptorist Channel					
Pasay				Coral Way	Traffic light intersection.
Pasay				Marina Way	
Pasay				Epifanio de los Santos Avenue (EDSA) Extension	Globe Rotunda
Pasay				Sunset Avenue	Traffic light intersection. One-way road.
Pasay				Palm Coast Avenue	Southbound access only.
Pasay				Bayshore Avenue	Traffic light intersection.
Pasay				Seaside Boulevard	Traffic light intersection.
Libertad Channel				J.W. Diokno Bridge	
Pasay				N190 (Gil Puyat Avenue) / Zoilo Hilario Street	Northern terminus. Continues to CCP Complex as Atang de la Rama Street.
1.000 mi = 1.609 km; 1.000 km = 0.621 mi: Incomplete access

== Landmarks ==
Manila Film Center

Four E-Com Center

Mall of Asia Arena

- Ayala Malls Manila Bay
- CCP Open Field
- Center for International Trade Expositions and Missions (CITEM)
- Grand Westside Hotel
- Government Service Insurance System Center
  - Senate of the Philippines
- Kingsford Hotel Manila
- Landers Aseana
- Manila Film Center
- Monarch Parksuites
- Okada Manila
- Philippine Trade Training Center
- Resorts World Bayshore Residential
- SM Mall of Asia
  - Four E-Com Center
  - Globe Rotunda
  - LUXE Duty Free
  - Mall of Asia Arena
  - Mall of Asia Arena Annex (MAAX) Building
  - One Esplanade Events Venue
  - SM by the Bay Amusement Park
  - SM Corporate Office
  - SMX Center for International Trade and Exhibitions (under construction)
- Solaire Resort & Casino
