= Primex Tower =

- The Primex Tower in June 2024.
- Interactive map of the Primex Tower area
- Hotel chain: Pullman Hotels and Resorts

General information
- Status: Completed
- Location: EDSA corner Connecticut Street, San Juan, Philippines
- Coordinates: 14°36′06.4″N 121°03′31.3″E
- Current tenants: Pullman Manila
- Construction started: July 2018
- Topped-out: 2022
- Completed: 2023
- Cost: ₱3.6 billion
- Owner: Primex Corporation

Height
- Height: 617 ft (188 m)

Technical details
- Floor count: 50 (including basement)

Design and construction
- Architecture firm: JSLA Architects

Other information
- Number of rooms: 200
- Number of restaurants: 2

The Primex Tower (stylized as PRIMEX Tower) is a 50-storey office skyscraper in San Juan, Metro Manila, Philippines.

== Location ==
The building is located on the 1,944-square-meter (20,930 sq ft) lot bounded by EDSA, Connecticut, and Florida Streets in Barangay Greenhills, San Juan, Metro Manila.

== Features ==
With a total of 50 storeys including basement level/s, the Primex Tower became the tallest building in San Juan, Metro Manila upon its completion. Designed by JSLA Architects, it will have 41,000 m^{2} (440,000 sq ft) of total leasable office space. Its first 12 floors will be allotted for above-ground and basement parking, while office spaces will occupy the next 27 floors. The last 10 will be occupied by a hotel.

Billboards are also hung on the building's northern and eastern side.

== History ==
Primex Corporation announced in 2017 that it would be building the Primex Tower. The groundbreaking ceremony for the building was held a year later on July 11, 2018.

In December 2020, Primex secured a deal with Accor to open a hotel named Pullman Manila at the Primex Tower. The hotel under Accor's Pullman hotel brand will occupy the building's ten topmost floors.

The building topped-off by early 2022, and was completed the following year. In July 2023, the Department of Transportation opened a satellite office at the tower for the Office of the Secretary.

In October 2024, Pullman backed out from the deal over difference in design preferences with Primex.

In March 2025, Primex found another hotel firm to replace Pullman with Dusit International planning to operate the Dusit Greenhills Manila on the top ten floors of the building. The hotel is projected to open in 2026.
