= Grand Soho Makati =

Residential skyscraper in Makati, Philippines

- Interactive map of the Grand Soho Makati area

General information
- Status: Completed
- Type: Residential
- Location: 131 H.V. de la Costa Street, Makati, Philippines
- Coordinates: 14°33′43″N 121°01′23″E
- Completed: June 2010

Height
- Height: 152.62 m (500.7 ft)

Technical details
- Floor count: 41

Design and construction
- Architects: Roger Villarosa Architects & Associates
- Developer: Century Properties

The Grand Soho Makati is a residential skyscraper in Makati, Philippines. Located in Salcedo Village, it has 41 floors above ground, and was developed by Century Properties. It was completed in June 2010.

== Features ==
Six units are allocated for commercial spaces at the ground floor. The 41-storey residential building comes with high-speed elevators, a Travertine stone-clad lobby, and concierge services.

== See also ==
- List of tallest buildings in Metro Manila
