= Mandarin Oriental Manila =

Former hotel in Makati, Philippines (1976–2014)

- Mandarin Oriental Manila in 2012, along with the statue of General Pio del Pilar at the intersection of Makati Avenue and Paseo de Roxas.
- Interactive map of the Mandarin Oriental Manila area

General information
- Location: Makati Avenue, Makati, Philippines
- Coordinates: 14°33′32.5″N 121°01′37.7″E
- Opening: September 1976
- Closed: September 9, 2014
- Operator: Mandarin Oriental Hotel Group

Technical details
- Floor count: 18

Design and construction
- Architect: Leandro Locsin
- Developer: Ayala Land
- Known for: Longest operating international chain hotel in the Philippines

Other information
- Number of rooms: 413
- Number of suites: 29
- Number of restaurants: 7 restaurant and bars (2014)

Website
- www.mandarinoriental.com/manila/ (Archived)

The Mandarin Oriental Manila was a hotel along Makati Avenue in Makati, Metro Manila, Philippines, managed by the Mandarin Oriental Hotel Group and designed by National Artist Leandro Locsin, which operated from 1976 to 2014. The replacement hotel, the Mandarin Oriental Makati, Manila will open on December 14, 2026.

== History ==
The hotel was designed by Leandro Locsin and a British design consultant. The 18-storey building was built on a site which was known as the Diamond Triangle and opened in 1976. It had the first in-house movie system in the Philippines. Since 1996, the hotel was known for its annual Chinese New Year celebrations. These celebrations were cited among the celebrations within Metro Manila outside Binondo. In 2001, the hotel opened The Spa at Mandarin Oriental, a luxury spa within its premises, becoming the first hotel in the country to have done so.

On June 4, 2014, The Mandarin Oriental Hotel Group announced that it would close the hotel by the end of 2014. The management began closing the hotel gradually, area by area, instead of shutting down all the hotel areas at once. The hotel saw its last day of operation on September 9, 2014.

Ayala Land stated in September 2014 that the redevelopment of the site of the Mandarin Oriental Manila was being planned along with architectural consultations with LVLP, the firm of Leandro Locsin. The redevelopment of the site of InterContinental Manila was also being planned. The building was later demolished.

== Heritage status ==
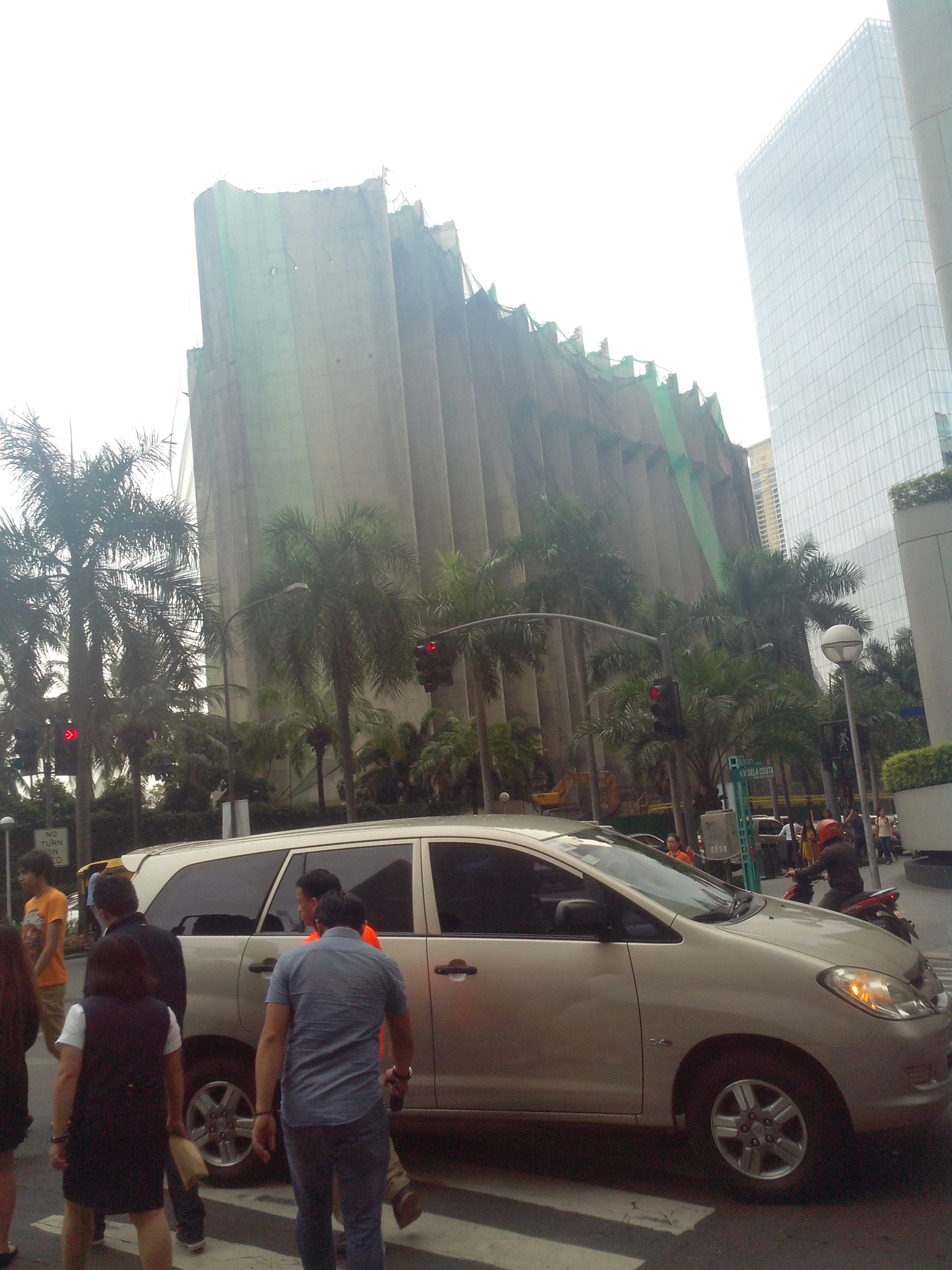
Gradual demolition works of the building. December 2015.

The Heritage Conservation Society (HCS) expressed concern on its Facebook page about the possible demolition of the old Mandarin Oriental Manila building along with InterContinental Manila. Former HCS Vice President and member of the group's Advisory Council, Domic Garcia, who is also an architect, urged for the buildings not to be demolished and argued that while not all of the works of architect Leandro Locsin should be preserved, his best works should. He also suggested that the buildings may be reused for other purposes or integrated into a new design; specifically, he proposed to use the Mandarin Oriental building as the base of a new and taller tower complementing the architecture of the older building. The HCS also cited the National Cultural Heritage Act of 2009, which stated that works of National Artists such as Locsin were considered as important cultural property (ICP). However the building was never officially considered as an ICP, with the removal of its presumption as such by the National Commission for Culture and the Arts paved way for its demolition.

Under the National Cultural Heritage Act, a site can only be declared a heritage site if it is at least 50 years old. The Mandarin Hotel building was about 38 years old on its full closure in 2014.

== Replacement ==
The Park Central Towers was built on the site of the old Mandarin Oriental Manila. The building topped off in October 2022.

The lease of the management of the Mandarin Oriental Manila with Ayala Land was due to end in 2026 but the board decided to close the hotel instead of waiting for the lease to expire. The new Mandarin Oriental Manila will be built across the street at the Ayala Triangle Gardens and is planned to have 275 rooms. The new hotel to be developed and owned by Ayala Land Hotels & Resorts is planned to be completed by 2020.

On April 25, 2024, however, Ayala Land President and CEO Anna Ma. Margarita B. Dy told stockholders that the hotel will open in 2026, instead of 2020 due to construction delays by the outbreak of COVID-19 pandemic in the Philippines.
