= The Residences at Greenbelt =

Residential skyscraper complex in Makati, Philippines

Coordinates: 14°33′04″N 121°01′12″E

The Residences at Greenbelt as seen from Greenbelt

The Residences at Greenbelt is a residential skyscraper complex in Makati, Philippines. Adjacent to the Greenbelt shopping mall, the project is developed and managed by Ayala Land. It is composed of three towers:

- The Residences at Greenbelt - Laguna Tower
- The Residences at Greenbelt - Manila Tower
- The Residences at Greenbelt - San Lorenzo Tower

The towers are among the country's tallest, with the San Lorenzo Tower set to be the 6th tallest building in the Philippines upon completion. It sits on the lot where Anson's Arcade once stood.

== See also ==
Residences at Greenbelt in 2014

- List of tallest buildings in Metro Manila
