= Pacific Star Building =

Office building in Makati, Philippines

- Interactive map of the Pacific Star Building area
- Alternative names: Nauru Building

Record height
- Tallest in the Philippines from 1989 to 1991^{[I]}
- Preceded by: Manila Pavilion Hotel
- Surpassed by: The Peak Tower

General information
- Status: Completed
- Type: Office
- Coordinates: 14°33′40″N 121°01′38″E
- Completed: 1989
- Operator: Century Property Group

Height
- Roof: 112.5 m (369.09 ft)

Technical details
- Floor count: 29
- Floor area: More than 56,000 m^{2} (602,778.98 ft^{2})
- Lifts/elevators: 14

Design and construction
- Architect: Gabriel Formoso
- Architecture firm: GF & Partners Architects
- Structural engineer: Siemens Building Technologies
- Main contractor: Republic of Nauru

The Pacific Star Building, also known as the Nauru Building, is a 29-storey high-rise building in Makati, Metro Manila, Philippines. It was the tallest building in the country upon its completion.

== Background ==
The building was built by the Republic of Nauru through its Nauru Phosphate Royalties Trust. The high-rise building is managed by Century Properties Group. An adjacent 6-storey low-rise office building, the Pacific Star Building Low Rise is also partially owned by the company and is part of the building complex. The Monterrey building of DMCI was demolished to give way to the construction of the building. Completed in 1989 and inaugurated on May 17, 1989, by then Nauruan Health and Education Minister Reuben J. Kun, Pacific Star Building was the tallest building in the Philippines upon its completion until it was surpassed by Rufino Pacific Tower.

== Architecture and design ==
Pacific Star Building entrance

The Pacific Star Building consists of two buildings, a 29-storey high-rise building with four basement levels and a 6-storey low-rise building which is built around a semicircular driveway ornamented with a fountain. The taller building stands 112.5 meters (369.09 ft) high.

The building was designed by architect, Gabriel Formoso under his firm, GF & Partners Architects. The architecture firm describes the building's arches as inspired from Spanish architecture. Siemens Building Technologies was responsible for the structural engineering of the building.

== Reception ==
The building is among the few buildings at the Makati Central Business District to be rated five stars by the Makati Commercial Estates Association.

== See also ==
- List of tallest buildings in Metro Manila
- Nauru House
