= The Residences at Greenbelt – San Lorenzo Tower =

The Residences at Greenbelt - San Lorenzo Tower
- The Residences at Greenbelt. San Lorenzo Tower is at the center.
- Interactive map of the The Residences at Greenbelt - San Lorenzo Tower area

General information
- Status: Completed
- Type: Residential
- Location: Arnaiz Avenue, Makati, Philippines
- Coordinates: 14°33′3.93″N 121°1′12.18″E
- Construction started: 2006
- Completed: 2009
- Opening: 2009
- Cost: ₱2,800,000,000
- Owner: Ayala Land, Inc.
- Operator: Ayala Property Management Corp.

Height
- Antenna spire: 204.5 m (670.9 ft)
- Roof: 196 m (643.0 ft)

Technical details
- Floor count: 57 aboveground, 3 belowground
- Lifts/elevators: 4

Design and construction
- Architects: Architecture International, in cooperation with GF & Partners Architects
- Developer: Ayala Land, Inc.
- Structural engineer: Aromin & Sy + Associates, Inc., in cooperation with Skilling Ward Magnusson Barkshire
- Main contractor: Makati Development Corporation

The Residences at Greenbelt – San Lorenzo Tower is a residential condominium skyscraper in Makati, Philippines. It is the second building of The Residences at Greenbelt (TRAG) complex, and is the highest of the three. It is the 21st-tallest building in the country and Metro Manila with a height of 204.5 meters (671 ft) from the ground to its architectural spire.

The building has 57 floors above ground, which includes a 4-level podium with commercial establishments, and 3 basement levels for parking. It is considered to be one of the most prestigious residential building in the Philippines. It is apparently named after the adjacent San Lorenzo Village, which it faces to the south.

== Location ==
The Residences at Greenbelt complex is located along Arnaiz Avenue, formerly known as Pasay Road, and the entire complex block is bounded by Paseo de Roxas, Greenbelt Drive and Esperanza Street. The complex was formerly the site of the old Coronado Lanes bowling center and parking lot. The building is located at the Makati Central Business District and is part of the Greenbelt Complex which includes the Greenbelt Mall. Just right across Greenbelt Drive is the New World Makati Hotel.

== Construction and design ==
The Residences at Greenbelt – San Lorenzo Tower was masterplanned and designed by Architecture International, in cooperation with local architectural firm GF & Partners Architects, which also made the Space Planning consultancy services. Structural design for the building was provided by Aromin & Sy + Associates, and reviewed by international engineering firm Skilling Ward Magnusson Berkshire.

The buildings mechanical engineering works was designed by R.J. Calpo & Partners; electrical engineering works design & security consultancy was provided by R.A. Mojica & Partners. Sanitary / plumbing engineering design and fire protection design was provided by NBF Consulting Engineers.

Other members of the design team are E.A. Aurelio + ADI Ltd. Inc. (Landscape design); ALT Cladding & Design Philippines (Exterior Cladding); C.T. Onglao Architects (San Lorenzo Tower Interior Design for common areas); and Master Charlie Chao (Feng Shui Consultant).

The construction team is composed of Jose Aliling & Associates (Project / Construction Management); Rider Hunt Liacor Inc. (Quantity Surveying); and Makati Development Corporation (General Contractor).

Property management is provided by Ayala Property Management Corporation.

During the construction phase, it is also known as the TRAG-2 Project.

== See also ==
- The Residences at Greenbelt - Laguna Tower
- The Residences at Greenbelt - Manila Tower
- List of tallest buildings in the Philippines
