= The Residences at Greenbelt – Laguna Tower =

Residential condominium skyscraper in Makati, Philippines

The Residences at Greenbelt - Laguna Tower
- The Residences at Greenbelt. Laguna Tower is at the left.
- Interactive map of the The Residences at Greenbelt - Laguna Tower area

General information
- Status: Completed
- Type: Residential
- Location: Arnaiz Avenue, Makati, Philippines
- Coordinates: 14°33′3.97″N 121°1′14.24″E
- Named for: Laguna de Bay
- Construction started: 2005
- Completed: 2008
- Opening: 2008
- Owner: Ayala Land, Inc.
- Operator: Ayala Property Management Corp.

Height
- Roof: 170.75 m (560.2 ft)

Technical details
- Floor count: 48 aboveground, 3 belowground
- Lifts/elevators: 4

Design and construction
- Architects: Architecture International, in cooperation with GF & Partners Architects
- Developer: Ayala Land, Inc.
- Structural engineer: Aromin & Sy + Associates, Inc.
- Main contractor: EEI Corporation

The Residences at Greenbelt – Laguna Tower is a residential condominium skyscraper in Makati, Philippines. It is the first of three buildings constructed as part of The Residences at Greenbelt (TRAG) complex, and is the twin of The Residences at Greenbelt - Manila Tower. It is expected to be one of the tallest skyscrapers in the Philippines with a height of 170.75 meters (560.2 ft) from the ground to its architectural top.

The building has 48 floors above ground, which includes a four-level podium with commercial establishments, and 3 basement levels for parking. It is considered to be one of the most prestigious residential building in the Philippines. It is named after the Laguna de Bay, which lies to its southeast, toward which it faces east.

== Location ==
The Residences at Greenbelt complex is located along Arnaiz Avenue (formerly known as Pasay Road), and the entire complex block is bounded by Paseo de Roxas, Greenbelt Drive and Esperanza Street. The complex was formerly the site of the old Coronado Lanes bowling center and parking lot. Being inside the Makati Central Business District, it is strategically located near malls, hotels, offices, schools, and entertainment areas. As with its name, it is part of the Greenbelt Complex which includes the Greenbelt Mall. Just right across Greenbelt Drive is the New World Makati Hotel.

== The Project Team ==
The Residences at Greenbelt – Laguna Tower was designed by Architecture International, in cooperation with local architectural firm GF & Partners Architects. Structural design for the building was provided by Aromin & Sy + Associates, and reviewed by international engineering firm Skilling Ward Magnusson Barkshire.

The buildings mechanical engineering works was designed by R.J. Calpo & Partners; electrical engineering works design was provided by R.A. Mojica & Partners. Sanitary / plumbing engineering design and fire protection design was provided by NBF Consulting Engineers and NBF Firetech Fire Protection Systems, respectively.

Other members of the design team are Shen Milson & Wike Paoletti {Acoustics Consultant); Windtech Consultants {Wind Tunnel Consultants]; Glover / Resnick & Associates (Security Consultant); Roy Barry & Associates (Elevator Design Consultant); International Parking Design (Parking Design Consultant); ACL Asia {now E.A. Aurelio + ADI Ltd. Inc. - Landscape design); ALT Cladding & Design Philippines (Exterior Cladding); Periquet Galicia Inc. (Space Planning Consultant); and Master Joseph Chau Kam Shing (Feng Shui Consultant).

The construction team is composed of Design Coordinates Inc. (Project / Construction Management); Rider Hunt Liacor Inc. (Quantity Surveying); and EEI Corporation (General Contractor).

Property management is provided by Ayala Property Management Corporation.

During the construction phase, it is also known as the TRAG-1 Project.

== See also ==
- The Residences at Greenbelt – San Lorenzo Tower
- The Residences at Greenbelt – Manila Tower
