= De la Rosa Elevated Walkway =

Elevated pedway network in Makati, Philippines

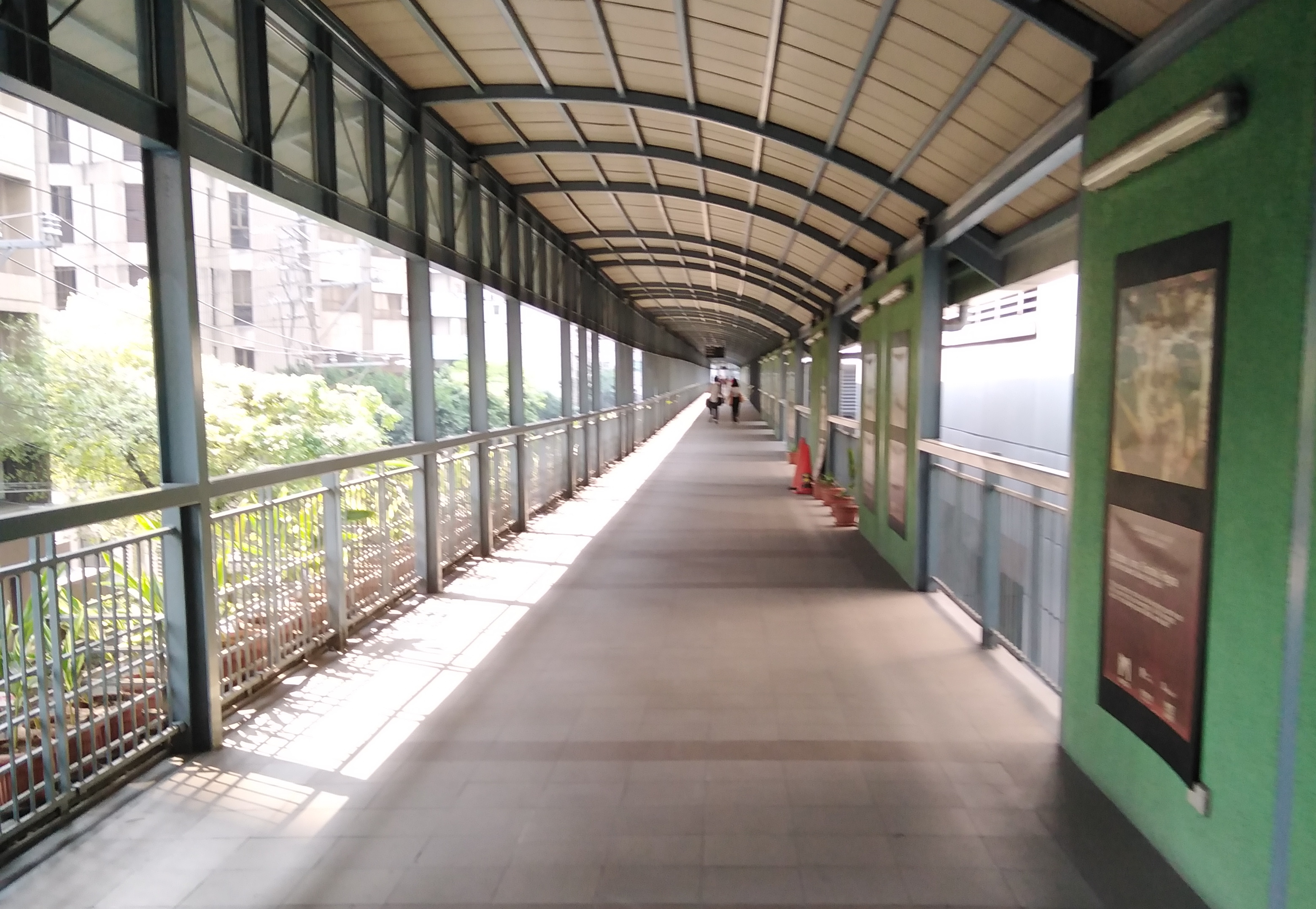
- Type: Elevated pedway network
- Owner: Makati Commercial Estate Association
- Length: 1,110 m (3,640 ft)
- Location: Makati, Metro Manila, Philippines

Construction
- Completed: 1990s

The De la Rosa Elevated Walkway is a network of elevated pedway in Makati, Metro Manila, Philippines. Measuring 1,110 meters (3,640 ft), the structure is the longest elevated pedway in the Philippines. It runs mostly along De la Rosa Street in Legazpi Village of Makati Central Business District from Greenbelt at Ayala Center to Ayala North Exchange along Salcedo Street. It physically links buildings such as the Ayala North Exchange, Makati Medical Center, Eton Tower Makati, De la Rosa Car Park 1 & 2, The Enterprise Center Tower, and Greenbelt.

The pedway's construction began in the early 1990s. The first phase of the pedway network was completed at the length of 795 meters (2,608 ft). In the mid-2010s, pedway was extended by 305 meters (1,001 ft) with the new portion inaugurated in November 2016 but was completed in 2018.
