= Roxas Triangle Towers =

- The Roxas Triangle Towers in 2022

General information
- Status: Completed
- Type: Residential Condominium
- Location: Paseo de Roxas cor. Cruzada St., Makati, Philippines
- Coordinates: 14°33′34″N 121°1′44″E
- Completed: 2001 (One Roxas Triangle); 2019 (Two Roxas Triangle)
- Opening: 2001 (One Roxas Triangle); 2019 (Two Roxas Triangle)
- Owner: Roxas Land Corporation
- Operator: Ayala Property Management Corporation

Height
- Roof: 174.3 m (571.85 ft)

Technical details
- Floor count: 51 aboveground
- Lifts/elevators: 6

Design and construction
- Architects: Skidmore, Owings & Merrill, LLP, in cooperation with Pimentel Rodriguez Simbulan & Partners
- Developer: Ayala Land, Inc.; Hongkong Land Inc.; Bank of the Philippine Islands
- Structural engineer: Aromin & Sy + Associates, in cooperation with Skilling Ward Magnusson Barkshire Inc.
- Main contractor: D.M. Consunji, Inc. (One Roxas Triangle); Makati Development Corporation (Two Roxas Triangle)

The Roxas Triangle Towers, are a complex of 2 residential condominium skyscrapers located in Makati, Philippines. The complex is owned by Roxas Land Corp., a joint venture between Ayala Land, Inc., Hongkong Land, Ltd. and Bank of the Philippine Islands.

== Project team ==
Street-level view of One Roxas Triangle

The One Roxas Triangle, also known as the One Roxas Triangle Tower 1 or Roxas Triangle Tower One, was designed by international architectural firm Skidmore, Owings & Merrill, LLP in cooperation with local architectural firm Pimentel Rodriguez Simbulan & Partners; while the structural design was provided by international engineering company Skilling Ward Magnusson Barkshire Inc. in cooperation with renowned local engineering firm Aromin & Sy + Associates. Construction management works were provided by TCGI Engineers, quantity surveying works by Davis, Langdon and Seah Philippines, and the general contractor is D.M. Consunji, Inc. It stands at 174.3 metres (571.85 feet).

Members of the engineering and design team are Flack & Kurtz Consulting Engineers, LLP in cooperation with DCCD Engineering Corp. (Mechanical and Electrical Works); N.B. Franco Consulting Engineers (Sanitary and Fire Protection Works); Belt Collins (HK) Ltd. (Landscape Architecture); Shen Milson & Wilke (Acoustic Design); Control Risks Pacific Pty. Ltd. (Security Services); and Paul Lau (Feng Shui consultancy).

== Two Roxas Triangle ==
Street-level view of Two Roxas Triangle

Twenty years after the launch of One Roxas Triangle, Roxas Land Corp. launched the second tower called Two Roxas Triangle in 2013 to address the needs of the uppermost luxury segment of the market. It was completed and opened in 2019.
