= Gabriel Formoso =

Filipino architect

- Born: Gabriel P. Formoso; April 9, 1915; Manila, Philippine Islands
- Died: December 22, 1996 (aged 81)
- Occupation: Architect
- Years active: 1939–1990
- Awards: Order of National Artists of the Philippines (2026)

Gabriel P. Formoso was a Filipino architect who was posthumously recognized as a National Artist of the Philippines for architecture.

== Early life and education ==
Gabriel P. Formoso was born in Manila on April 9, 1915. He attended Ateneo de Manila High School finishing his secondary studies in 1933 He attended the University of Santo Tomas where he graduated with an architecture degree in 1937. He was registered as an architect in 1939.

== Career ==
Gabriel Formoso apprenticed under Andres Luna (the son of Juan Luna), and later Pablo Antonio Sr. His collaboration with Luis Araneta marked the beginning of his career, preceding his establishment of a private practice. On December 20, 1973, Formoso and his associates transformed his sole proprietorship into a professional partnership, establishing Gabriel Formoso & Partners Co.

One of the first 100 licensed architects in the Philippines, Formoso designed over 200 residential, industrial, and commercial structures. His style is characterized as a post-modernist.

His notable works include the Asian Institute of Management Building, Doña Narcisa Building, Bangko Sentral ng Pilipinas Complex, Philippine National Bank Financial Center, Lepanto Building, United Coconut Planters Bank, Dusit Thani Manila, Pacific Star Building, The Peninsula Manila, Heritage Hotel, and PLDT Sampaloc Complex.

Formoso also taught architecture at the University of Santo Tomas.

Formoso retired in 1990, after which Gabriel Formoso & Partners Co. was renamed GF & Partners Architects Co. by its remaining members in his honor. The firm was later renamed GFP Architects in 2021.

== Death and legacy ==
Formoso died on December 22, 1996.

Formoso was conferred multiple awards for his architectural work, including the 1977 Patnubay ng Kalinangan Award from the Commission on Arts and Culture and the 1979 Outstanding Architect of the Year Award from the Professional Regulation Commission. In 1990, Formoso received the Likha Award from the United Architects of the Philippines, the organization's highest distinction for fellows.

Formoso has been nominated for the National Artist of the Philippines award as early as 2003. He was recognized as a National Artist for architecture in September 2026.
