= Mandarin Oriental Makati, Manila =

- The hotel building from the Ayala Triangle Gardens; March 2020

General information
- Location: Makati Avenue, Makati, Philippines
- Coordinates: 14°33′25.9″N 121°01′29.3″E
- Opening: December 14, 2026 (planned)
- Operator: Mandarin Oriental Hotel Group

Height
- Height: 98.7 m (324 ft)

Design and construction
- Developer: Ayala Land

Other information
- Number of rooms: 275

Website
- mandarinoriental.com/en/manila/makati

The Mandarin Oriental Makati, Manila is a hotel under construction in Makati, Metro Manila, Philippines.

== History ==
=== Original hotel ===
An older hotel building stood near the site of the Mandarin Oriental Makati, Manila. The original Mandarin Oriental Manila opened in 1976 with 18-storeys. It was designed by Leandro Locsin and a British design consultant.

On June 4, 2014, The Mandarin Oriental Hotel Group announced that it would close the hotel by the end of 2014. The hotel saw its last day of operation on September 9, 2014. The demolition of the building was subject of concern by heritage conservationists due to it being a work of Locsin, a National Artist. The building was eventually demolished.

The Park Central Towers was built on the site of the old Mandarin Oriental Manila. The new building topped off in October 2022.

=== Current hotel ===
The lease of the management of the Mandarin Oriental Manila with Ayala Land was due to end in 2026 but the board decided to close the hotel instead of waiting for the lease to expire. The new hotel to be developed and owned by Ayala Land Hotels & Resorts was originally planned to be completed by 2020.

On April 25, 2024, however, Ayala Land President and CEO Anna Margarita Dy told stockholders that the hotel will open in 2026, instead of 2020 due to construction delays by the COVID-19 pandemic.

Hotel reservations opened in June 2026. The opening of the hotel is scheduled for December 14, 2026.

== Facilities ==
The Mandarin Oriental Makati, Manila will be housed inside a 98.7-meter (324 ft) building and will have 275 rooms. It also has a 800-square-meter (8,600 sq ft) spa and wellness floor, fitness and yoga facilities and a 25 m (82 ft) outdoor swimming pool. It will also have a 740 m^{2} (8,000 sq ft) Grand Hall which can accommodate 1,000 guests for events.
