= The Residences at Greenbelt – Manila Tower =

The Residences at Greenbelt - Manila Tower
- The Residences at Greenbelt. Manila Tower is at the right.
- Interactive map of the The Residences at Greenbelt - Manila Tower area

General information
- Status: Completed
- Type: Residential
- Location: Arnaiz Avenue, Makati, Philippines
- Coordinates: 14°33′4.33″N 121°1′10.10″E
- Named for: Manila Bay
- Construction started: September 2006
- Completed: 2012
- Cost: ₱2,100,000,000
- Owner: Ayala Land, Inc.
- Operator: Ayala Property Management Corp.

Height
- Roof: 170.75 m (560.2 ft)

Technical details
- Floor count: 48 aboveground, 3 belowground
- Lifts/elevators: 4

Design and construction
- Architects: Architecture International, in cooperation with GF & Partners Architects
- Developer: Ayala Land, Inc.
- Structural engineer: Aromin & Sy + Associates, Inc., in cooperation with Skilling Ward Magnusson Barkshire
- Main contractor: SKI Construction Group

The Residences at Greenbelt – Manila Tower is a residential condominium skyscraper in Makati, Philippines. It is the third buildings of The Residences at Greenbelt (TRAG) complex, and is the twin of The Residences at Greenbelt – Laguna Tower. It is one of the tallest skyscrapers in the Philippines with a height of 170.75 meters (560.2 ft) from the ground to its architectural top.

The building has 48 floors above ground, which includes a four-level podium with commercial establishments, and 3 basement levels for parking. It is considered to be one of the most prestigious residential buildings in the Philippines. It is named after the Manila Bay, which it faces to the west.

== Location ==
The Residences at Greenbelt complex is located along Arnaiz Avenue (formerly known as Pasay Road), and the entire complex block is bounded by Paseo de Roxas, Greenbelt Drive and Esperanza Street. The complex was formerly the site of the old Coronado Lanes bowling center and parking lot. Being inside the Makati Central Business District, it is strategically located near malls, hotels, offices, school, and entertainment areas. As with its name, it is part of the Greenbelt Complex which includes the Greenbelt Mall. Just right across Greenbelt Drive is the New World Makati Hotel.

== The Project Team ==
The Residences at Greenbelt – Manila Tower was masterplanned and designed by Architecture International, in cooperation with local architectural firm GF & Partners Architects, who also made the Space Planning consultancy services. Structural design for the building was provided by Aromin & Sy + Associates, and reviewed by international engineering firm Skilling Ward Magnusson Barkshire.

The buildings mechanical engineering works was designed by R.J. Calpo & Partners; electrical engineering works design & security consultancy was provided by R.A. Mojica & Partners. Sanitary / plumbing engineering design and fire protection design was provided by NBF Consulting Engineers.

Other members of the design team are E.A. Aurelio + ADI Ltd. Inc. (Landscape design); ALT Cladding & Design Philippines (Exterior Cladding); and Master Charlie Chao (Feng Shui Consultant).

The construction team is composed of Jose Aliling & Associates (Project / Construction Management); Davis Langdon & Seah Philippines Inc. (Quantity Surveying); and SKI Construction Group Inc. (General Contractor).

Property management is provided by Ayala Property Management Corporation.

During the construction phase, it is also known as the TRAG-3 Project.

== See also ==
- The Residences at Greenbelt – Laguna Tower
- The Residences at Greenbelt – San Lorenzo Tower
