= Sebastian Ugarte =

Filipino footballer

- Ugarte in 1930
Association football career
College career
Years	Team	Apps	(Gls)
1924–1925	De La Salle University		
International career
- Philippines
- Military career
- Allegiance: Philippines
- Branch: Philippine Army
- Rank: Major

Sebastian Ugarte was a Filipino international footballer and sports executive.

== Career ==
=== Youth career ===
From 1924 to 1925, Ugarte was part of the La Salle football and track and field teams.

=== International career ===
Ugarte was part of the Philippine national team that participated at the Far Eastern Championship Games. He became a household name among other players for his stints.

=== Non-playing career ===
Ugarte joined the San Miguel Corporation and was deeply involved in the now-defunct Philippine Football Association league. He led the team of San Miguel, and was also the Executive Vice-President at A. Soriano & Co. In the early 1960s, Ugarte through the Soriano group, hired British coaches Alan Rogers, Brian Birch, Danny McClelan and Graham Adams to train coaches, players and referees as well as the national youth and senior teams. In 1961, San Miguel through the Philippine Football Association hired four medical students from Spain who were proficient in football to aid the national team.

== Non-football activities ==
After his attendance in De La Salle University, he joined the Manila Daily Bulletin as a sports reporter and covered the sports of basketball, football, swimming and track and field.

At the start of the Commonwealth era, he served as legal adviser to Resident Commissioner Joaquín Miguel Elizalde and joined President Sergio Osmeña upon his return to the Philippines. Ugarte also worked under President Manuel Roxas in Malacañang. He was also a major at the Philippine Army.

== Legacy ==
He was inducted to the DLSAA Sports Hall of Fame in 1993. March 1974, a football venue which was named after him, the Sebastian Ugarte Football Field was inaugurated. The Ugarte Field is located inside the Ayala Triangle Gardens but there is no football field in the area since the early 1980s.

The footballer's descendant, Antonio Ugarte later became involved in football playing for Kaya F.C. of the United Football League.
