= Dusit Thani Manila =

Hotel in Manila, Philippines

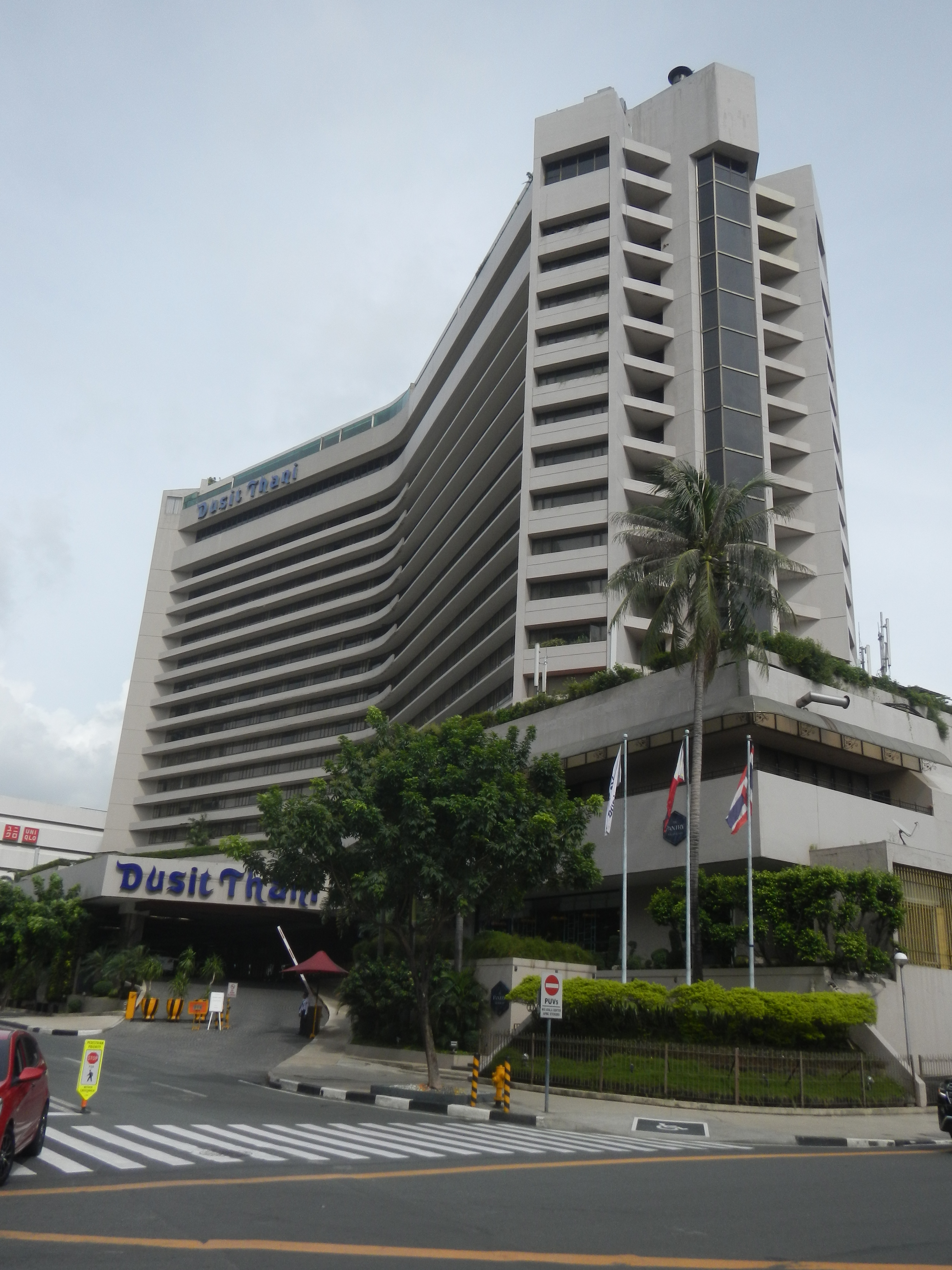
- Dusit Thani Manila in 2017

- Location within Philippines
- Former names: Manila Garden Hotel; Hotel Nikko Manila Garden; Dusit Hotel Nikko, Manila

General information
- Location: Ayala Center, Makati, Metro Manila, Philippines
- Coordinates: 14°32′54″N 121°1′34″E
- Completed: 1976; 50 years ago
- Opening: 1976; 50 years ago
- Renovated: 2008; 2017
- Operator: Dusit International

Technical details
- Floor count: 16
- Floor area: 2,500 m^{2} (27,000 sq ft)

Design and construction
- Architect: Gabriel Formoso

Other information
- Number of rooms: 538

The Dusit Thani Manila is a hotel in Makati, Metro Manila, Philippines. The hotel has a total area of 2,500 square meters (27,000 sq ft) and 538 rooms spread across 16 floors.

== History ==
Dusit Thani Manila was among the hotels which opened in Metro Manila in the 1970s in the lead up to the metropolis' hosting of the 1976 International Monetary Fund–World Bank meeting. The hotel building was completed in 1976 as the Manila Garden Hotel. Upon its opening, it had 511 rooms. Having a unique design and shaped like a "Y", the hotel has been compared to the Disney Contemporary Resort in Orlando, Florida for having a similar façade. They are well known in Metro Manila for their cuisine and Filipino dishes.

In 1995, Dusit International acquired the hotel by purchasing shares in the holding company, Philippine Hoteliers, Inc. (PHI), from Japan Airlines Development Company Limited and JAL Trading Inc. The hotel was rebranded in 1996 as the Hotel Nikko Manila Garden, which was co-operated by Hotel Nikko. It was later known as Dusit Hotel Nikko, Manila. It underwent major renovations and was renamed as Dusit Thani Manila on April 1, 2008. It is the first property with the Dusit Thani branding.

== Awards ==
- Benjarong is named among Top 20 Restaurants by T. Dining Best Restaurants Guide by Philippine Tatler
- World Luxury Travel Awards 2019
