= Lepanto Building =

- The Lepanto Building as seen from Ayala Triangle.
- Interactive map of the Lepanto Building area

General information
- Status: Completed
- Type: Office
- Location: 8749 Paseo de Roxas, Salcedo Village, Makati, Philippines
- Coordinates: 14.5581°N 121.0242°E
- Completed: 1978

Height
- Height: 74.80 m (245.41 ft)

Technical details
- Floor count: 20

Design and construction
- Architect: Gabriel Formoso

The Lepanto Building, (also known as the B.A. Lepanto Building or Bank of America Lepanto Building), is a 20-storey office building in Paseo de Roxas in Makati City. It was inaugurated in 1978 and was designed by distinguished architect Gabriel Formoso.

== History ==
The Lepanto Building is one of the earliest buildings in the Makati Central Business District. Built along Paseo de Roxas in the early 1970s, beside the now demolished Doña Narcisa de Leon Building (also by Formoso), the building was designed for the Philippine headquarters of the Bank of America and the Lepanto Consolidated Mining Company.

== Architecture and design ==
The Lepanto Building was a product of Filipino architect Gabriel Formoso (under his firm GF & Partners Architects), known for his distinctive high-arch design inspired by Spanish architecture, and his preference for the use of adobe walls. This can be seen in the building's tall arches, flanked by adobe clad walls on either side. The interior was rid of columns to allow maximal use of space for office planning.

== Location ==
Located along Paseo de Roxas across Ayala Triangle Gardens midway between Sedeño and Villar streets, it is beside the BDO Equitable Tower and Chinabank Building. Other nearby landmarks include the Paseo Center and the Citibank Center.

== Amenities and tenants ==
The building mainly functions as a commercial or office space with 10 elevators (8 passenger units, 1 executive and 1 service). It also has a restobar and a penthouse for multi-purpose events. Building occupants include Dole, AT&T, and Sodexo Philippines.
