= Tower One & Exchange Plaza =

- Interactive map of the Tower One & Exchange Plaza area
- Former names: Ayala Tower One

General information
- Status: Completed
- Type: office
- Location: 6767 Ayala Avenue corner Paseo de Roxas, Makati, Philippines
- Coordinates: 14°33′23.27″N 121°1′20.44″E
- Construction started: 1993
- Completed: 1996
- Opening: April 17, 1997
- Owner: Ayala Corporation
- Operator: Ayala Property Management Corporation

Height
- Roof: 160 m (524.93 ft)

Technical details
- Floor count: 35 above ground
- Lifts/elevators: 15

Design and construction
- Architect: Skidmore, Owings and Merrill, LLP
- Developer: Ayala Land, Inc.
- Structural engineer: Aromin & Sy + Associates, Inc.
- Main contractor: D.M. Consunji, Inc. (DMCI), Local Architect of Record: Leandro V. Locsin & Partners

Tower One & Exchange Plaza (formerly Ayala Tower One) is a skyscraper regarded as one of the tallest in the Philippines. It is located in the Makati Central Business District and has a height of 160 meters (520 ft). The building has 35 floors above ground level, and is originally planned to be the first of three towers for the Ayala Triangle. Plans for the construction of the two additional buildings did not materialize until 2021, due to the completion of the Ayala Triangle North complex. The area adjacent to the tower composes of 3 buildings, the Ayala Tower One, The Makati Stock Exchange (MkSE) and the former trading floor of the Philippine Stock Exchange.

Tower One & Exchange Plaza was designed by Skidmore, Owings and Merrill, LLP. Leandro V. Locsin & Partners was the local architect of record. The building is owned by Ayala Land, a subsidiary of the Ayala Corporation, which is headquartered in the building. Other institutions that headquartered at Ayala Tower One include the primary trading floor of the Philippine Stock Exchange (Until February 2018) and Banco de Oro Universal Bank (BDO). The tower also served as the headquarters of the Ayala Corporation, the company that built the Makati Central Business District, from its opening in 1997 to 2021, as the company moved its headquarters to the Ayala Triangle Gardens Tower 2, which is also located close within the vicinity of the Ayala Triangle complex.

== Location ==
The building is located at the corner of Ayala Avenue and Paseo de Roxas, on one of the three ends of the Ayala Triangle Gardens. Tower One & Exchange Plaza is located near two other famous buildings, the headquarters of Bank of the Philippine Islands, an Ayala Corporation company, and the former main office of Insular Life.

== History ==
This building was built solely as a response to the Philippine Stock Exchange relocating from Makati to the Tektite Towers - West Tower in Ortigas Center. Ayala Land was hoping that the Philippine Stock Exchange would reconsider its plan. It did not completely succeed with its attempt to keep the stock exchange exclusively in Makati since the Philippine Stock Exchange ultimately decided to have two trading floors: one each in Makati and Ortigas Center.

== Ownership ==
The building is strata title having multiple unit owners.
