= Siemens Building Technologies =

Operating Division of Siemens AG

Siemens Building Technologies, an Operating Division of Siemens AG
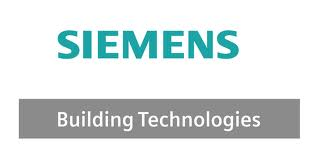
- Type: Aktiengesellschaft
- Industry: Building Automation, HVAC, Energy management, Fire safety, Security
- Founded: October 1, 1998
- Headquarters: Zug, Switzerland
- Area served: Worldwide
- Key people: Matthias Rebellius (CEO), Axel Meier (CFO)
- Products: Building automation and control systems, HVAC, fire safety, extinguishing, evacuation, security
- Services: Energy efficiency and sustainability management, enterprise security solutions
- Number of employees: 28,069 (September 2018), excl. trainees
- Website: www.buildingtechnologies.siemens.com

Siemens Building Technologies is an operating division of Siemens providing automation technologies and services for commercial, industrial and public buildings, and infrastructures. The division is headquartered in Zug, Switzerland, and employs 28,069 people worldwide (September 2018).

== History ==
Siemens Building Technologies resulted from the 1998 acquisition of the industrial activities of Elektrowatt Ltd. (Zurich, Switzerland), Cerberus Ltd. (Männdedorf, Switzerland), and of Staefa Control System Ltd. (Stäfa, Switzerland) by Siemens.

The newly built Siemens Building Technologies CPS Software House was opened in Chicago in October 2017, built for $20 million as an R&D facility. In 2018, the division made a number of acquisitions, including Comfy in Oakland, and the smart-building companies J2 Innovations and Enlightened. President of the Siemens Building Technologies division was Dave Hopping. The company is "a vertically-integrated company in relation to smart building design, construction and operation." The company's products are used in LaGuardia airport in New York. In early 2019, Siemens Building Technologies began working with Violet Defense.

== Corporate division ==
Since January 2013, the three former Business Units - Security Systems (SES), Building Automation (BAU) and Fire Safety and Security (FSS) are divided into two business areas: Control Products & Systems (CPS) and Solutions & Service Portfolio (SSP).

=== Control Products & Systems (CPS) ===
CPS designs and manufactures systems for building automation as well as products for heating, ventilation, air conditioning applications, for lighting, blinds controls, fire safety and extinguishing systems.

=== Solutions & Service Portfolio (SSP) ===
The SSP unit offers integrated solutions for specialized areas of application or markets such as data centers, airports or life science. The SSP unit develops strategies, messaging and tools which support the digitalization of buildings and processes.

== Controversies ==
=== Scandal about the merger with Landis and Gyr ===
In 2002 the Siemens Group sold seven subsidiary companies to the US financial investor KKR. Most affected by this sale was the Swiss company Siemens Metering, located in Zug. 160 out of 360 employees lost their jobs. Siemens Metering was the result of the merger between Siemens and Landis & Gyr in 1998.

The documentary “Verlorene Welt – Aus dem Innenleben des einstigen Konzerns Landis & Gyr” by Claudia Schmid and Michael van Orsouw involves the subject and had its first performance at the Solothurn Film Festival 2006.

=== Pension funds scandal ===
Siemens sharpened 2006 the rules of conduct for its employees as a reaction to the financial scandal about disloyalty and assumed corruption. Peter Rüegg and Siemens Manager Roland Rümmeli found themselves in the sight of the investigations. Rümmeli was accused to have redirected kickbacks to his private accounts. The laid-off portfolio manager paid back the illegally drawn money (400’000.00 CHF) to Siemens.
