= The Enterprise Center =

Skyscraper in Makati, Philippines

- The Enterprise Center as seen from Ayala Avenue.

General information
- Status: Completed
- Type: Office
- Location: 6766 Ayala Avenue corner Paseo de Roxas, Makati, Philippines
- Coordinates: 14°33′22.61″N 121°1′16.07″E
- Construction started: 1995
- Opening: 1999
- Owner: KSA Realty Corporation
- Operator: Shang Properties Management Services Inc. (SPMSI)

Height
- Roof: Tower 1: 172 m (564.30 ft); Tower 2: 124 m (406.82 ft)

Technical details
- Floor count: Tower 1: 40 aboveground, 7 belowground Tower 2: 30 aboveground
- Floor area: 81,000 m^{2} (871,876.74 sq ft)

Design and construction
- Architects: Wong & Tung International Limited - Hong Kong; ARADS & Associates - Manila
- Developer: KSA Realty Corporation
- Structural engineer: Aromin & Sy Associates, Inc.

The Enterprise Center is an office skyscraper located in Makati, Philippines. It is owned and developed by KSA Realty Corporation, a joint venture of the Kuok Group (majority shareholder) through Shang Properties, Inc. (PSE:SHNG), ING, and A. Soriano Corporation (ANSCOR) (PSE:ANS). The taller Tower I of the complex stands at 171.9 metres (564 feet) and is currently the 74th tallest building in the Philippines.

== Design ==
Hong Kong–based Wong & Tung International Limited (WTIL) is behind The Enterprise Center, in collaboration with ARADS & Associates, the local architect of The Enterprise Center.

By night, high intensity beams bathe the crowns in light.

== Location ==
The Enterprise Center, specifically Tower 1, is located at the corner of Ayala Avenue and Paseo de Roxas Avenue, while Tower 2 faces Dela Rosa Street. The center is situated at the heart of the business and finance district.

The building stands on the former site of SMC–Soriano Building.

== Amenities ==
The building has multiple entrances and exits, speeding up arrival and departure from the seven-level underground parking facility. The parking levels can accommodate over 1,200 vehicles for both tenants and visitors. A new bike stand is also provided, and is located at the Basement 1 parking area just at the back of the Drop Off staircase at Tower 2.

The tower is equipped with a helipad, and a private lounge one level below the helipad.

The fourth floor houses a 1,250 m^{2} (13,454.89 sq ft) International Food Court which serves a wide variety of cuisine. There are 25 outlets serving both building tenants and visitors.

Also available is a business center.
