= Ayala Triangle Gardens =

Urban park in Makati, Philippines

Coordinates: 14°33′23″N 121°1′25″E

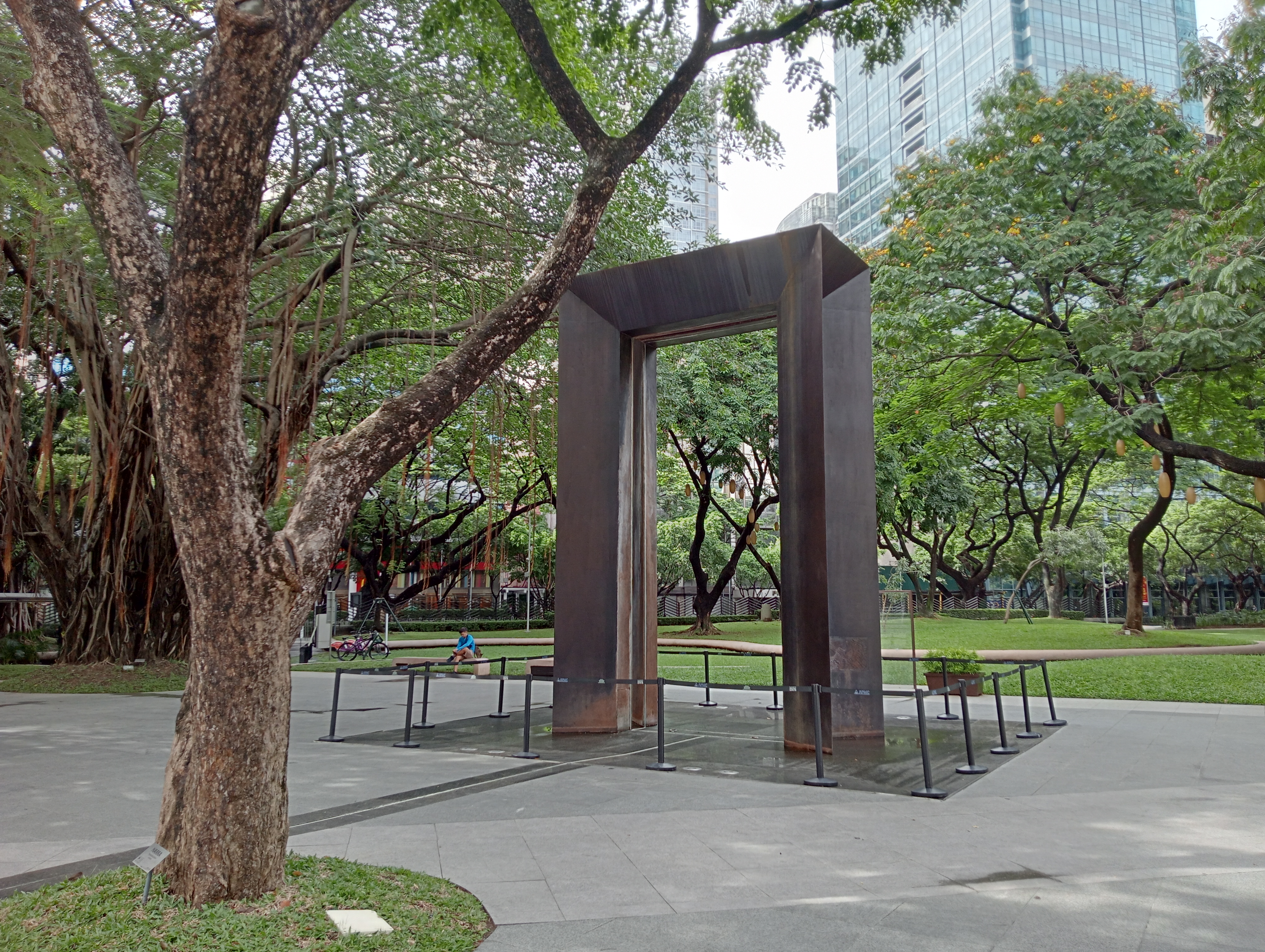
- McMicking Memorial at Ayala Triangle
- Interactive map of Ayala Triangle Gardens
- Type: Urban park
- Location: Makati, Philippines
- Area: 2 hectares (20,000 m^{2})
- Created: November 19, 2009; 16 years ago
- Operator: Ayala Land
- Status: Opened
- Public transit: Ayala Triangle: 10 11 12 38 40 42 45 46 59; Robinsons Summit Center; L02 Makati Stock Exchange
- Website: www.ayalatriangle.com/gardens

The Ayala Triangle Gardens is a 2-hectare (4.9-acre) landscaped urban park in Makati, Metro Manila, Philippines. It is a triangular public garden and courtyard in the center of the Makati Central Business District. It was named after its owner and developer Ayala Land, and opened to the public in November 19, 2009. Inspired by Hyde Park in London, the park, which is dotted with palms, acacia trees, and tropical foliage, is considered to be one of the largest "green" areas in Makati.

The Triangle has become a focal point for social events in the business district, and is popular at Christmas for its extravagant light-and-sound display. It is also home to the Tower One and Exchange Plaza and the Makati Stock Exchange Building, as well as Helm, the Philippines' first and only two-Michelin-starred restaurant, and the old Nielson Tower, which houses a fine dining restaurant called Blackbird.

== History ==
The land of the present-day Ayala Triangle Gardens was once the 42-hectare (100-acre) Nielson Field, Manila's pre-World War II airport, located in the vast Hacienda de San Pedro de Macati of the Zóbel de Ayala family. When the airport was decommissioned in 1948 and transferred its present site in Nichols Field, the site was returned to the Ayalas and redeveloped as a commercial district. The runways were converted into roads which now form the Triangle's boundaries: Ayala Avenue along its southwest; Paseo de Roxas along the north-northeast; and Makati Avenue to the east-southeast. Only the airport's control tower was preserved, and was converted into the Filipinas Heritage Library, and later as the Blackbird fine dining restaurant in 2014.

By 1971, the Ayala Corporation moved to its new headquarters in the Triangle at the Makati Stock Exchange Center building designed by National Artist for Architecture Leandro Locsin. The rest of the Triangle was then transformed into the football field known as Ugarte Field, named after the Filipino football legend of the 1930s, Sebastian Ugarte. In the 1980s, Ugarte Field was the site of regular protests against the Marcos dictatorship.

== Description ==
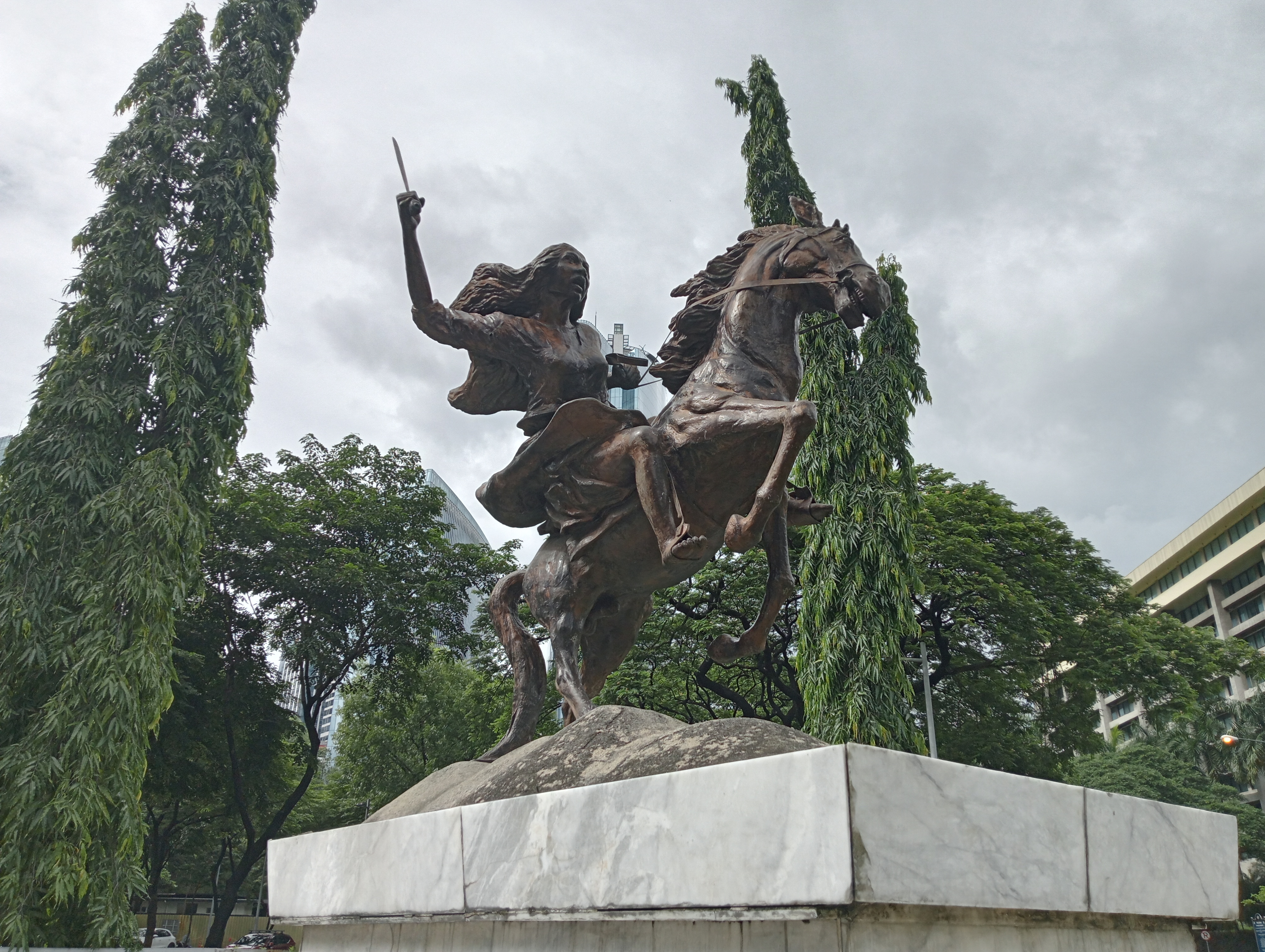
Gabriela Silang Monument at Ayala Triangle

View of Ayala Triangle Gardens North

The Ayala Triangle Gardens is located south of Salcedo Village, a part of barangay Bel-Air by its border with barangays San Lorenzo and Urdaneta. Buildings on the Triangle include the old Makati Stock Exchange Center and Ayala Tower One (former home of the Philippine Stock Exchange) along the Ayala Avenue side, the old Nielson Tower that has since been converted into a restaurant, and Ayala Triangle Tower One and Ayala Triangle Tower Two (cotaining The Shops at Triangle Gardens, an Ayala Mall) at the intersection of Makati Avenue and Paseo de Roxas.

The park has over a hundred trees of several different types, including rain trees, golden palms, fire trees, kamuning and podocarpus. It contains several public art pieces created by Filipino artists Ovvian Castrillo-Hill and Ral Arrogante. At the northwest corner of the Triangle is a monument to assassinated opposition leader Ninoy Aquino, designed by Anastacio Caedo and erected in 1986. Two other monuments can be found on the other corners of the Triangle: the Gabriela Silang monument at the southwest tip erected in 1971, and the Muhammad Kudarat monument at the northeast tip erected in 1973, both designed by sculptor José M. Mendoza.

A recent addition to the Triangle is the row of al fresco restaurants behind the Makati Stock Exchange building. The southeast corner of the Triangle also contains a parking lot just beside the old Nielson Tower. An 80,000-square-meter (860,000 sq ft) high-grade office tower named Ayala Triangle Tower Two was also built on its north corner, as well as the new Mandarin Oriental Manila, opposite its former location.

In 2017, a memorial to two of Makati CBD's visionaries and builders, Joseph McMicking and Mercedes Zobel McMicking of the Zóbel de Ayala family, was unveiled at the gardens.

== Events and shows ==
=== Car-Free Sundays at Ayala Avenue ===
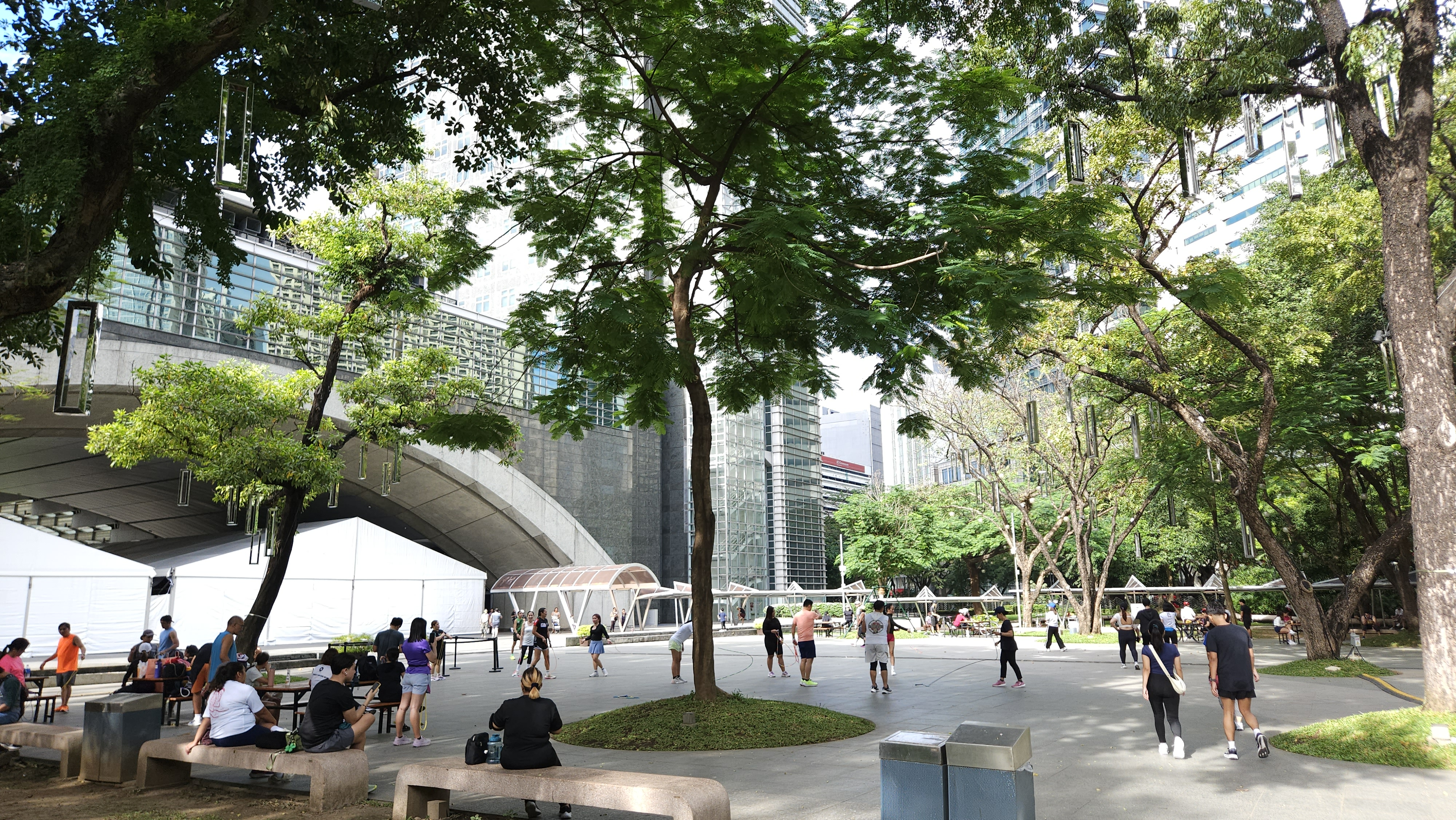
Ayala Triangle Gardens during Car-Free Sundays

Since September 2023, sections of Ayala Avenue as well as parts of Makati Avenue and Paseo de Roxas around the Ayala Triangle Gardens are closed to traffic on Sunday mornings as part of Ayala Land's Car-Free Sundays at Ayala Avenue, a car-free day initiative to encourage people to exercise and do other recreational activities. A pop-up 3x3 basketball court was added at the Gardens for the event in June 2025, and a pickleball court was added in August 2025.

=== Festival of Lights ===
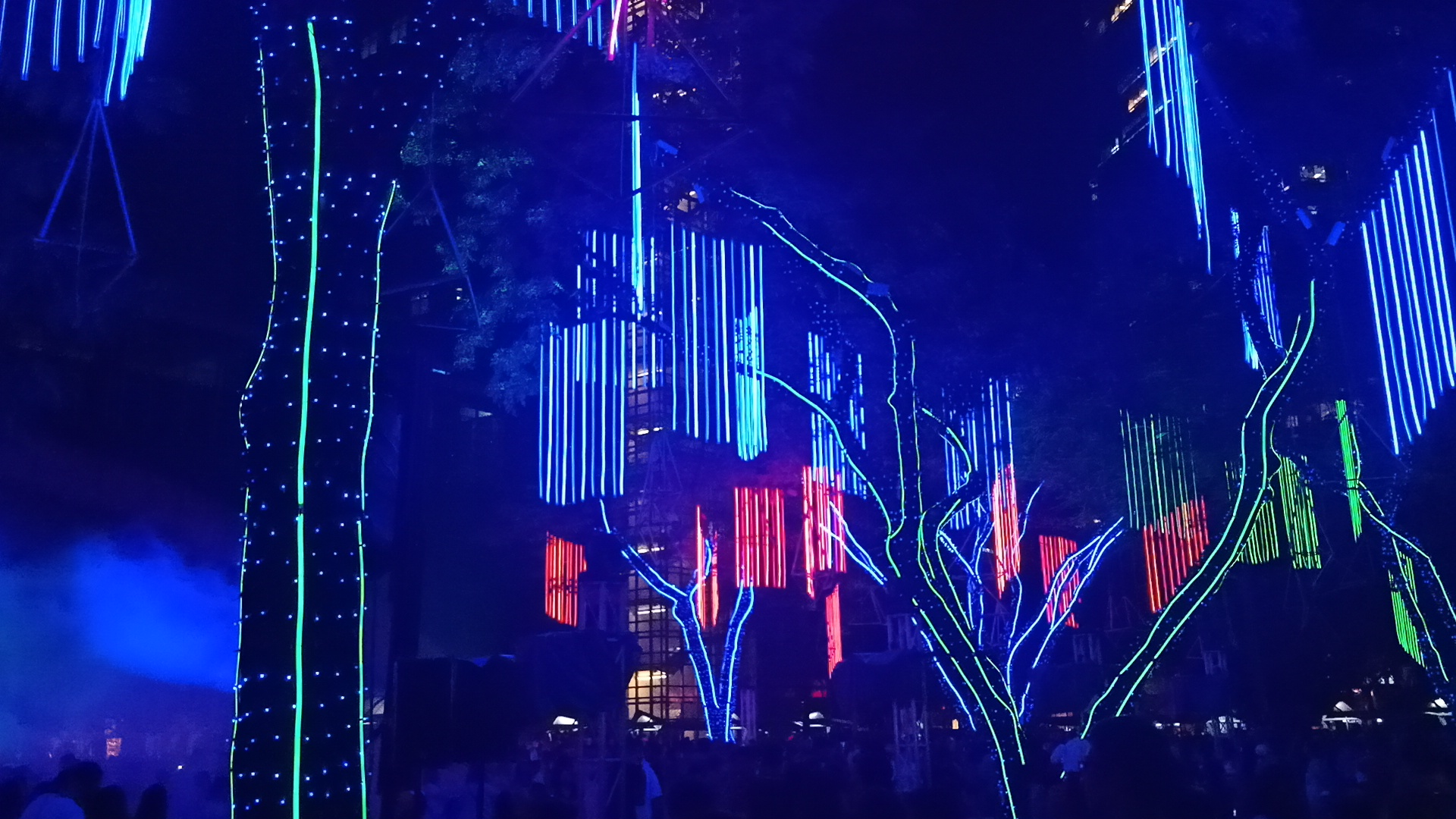
The Gallery of Lights display at the Ayala Triangle Gardens in November 2019.

The Ayala Triangle Gardens hosts the annual Festival of Lights, a lights and sound display from November to January of the following year. It premiered on November 20, 2009 as the Symphony of Lights. The show runs every 30 minutes from 6:00 p.m. PHT (UTC+8) until 10:00 p.m.

The show is conceptualized by award-winning lighting designers Voltaire de Jesus and Luther Gumia.

The show has flashing LED lights, laser effects and fog effects. A recent addition in the 2019 edition is a projection mapping at the Tower One and Exchange Plaza.

It features Filipino and international Christmas music. Some medleys in the show were inspired by the carnivals in Rio de Janeiro, Brazil.

During the COVID-19 pandemic, in 2020 and 2021, the show was recreated in a 360-degree animation, under the direction of filmmaker and director Quark Henares, head of Globe Studios. After two years, the Festival of Lights returned its onsite shows on November 10, 2022.

=== Music festivals ===
The park also hosts some music festivals, with some notable being the Pinoy Music Festival on September 5, 2014, and the ASEAN Music Festival on November 14, 2017. The ASEAN Music Festival in 2017 was cancelled during the show due to overcrowding.
