= Park Central Towers =

Twin Residential Building in Makati, Philippines

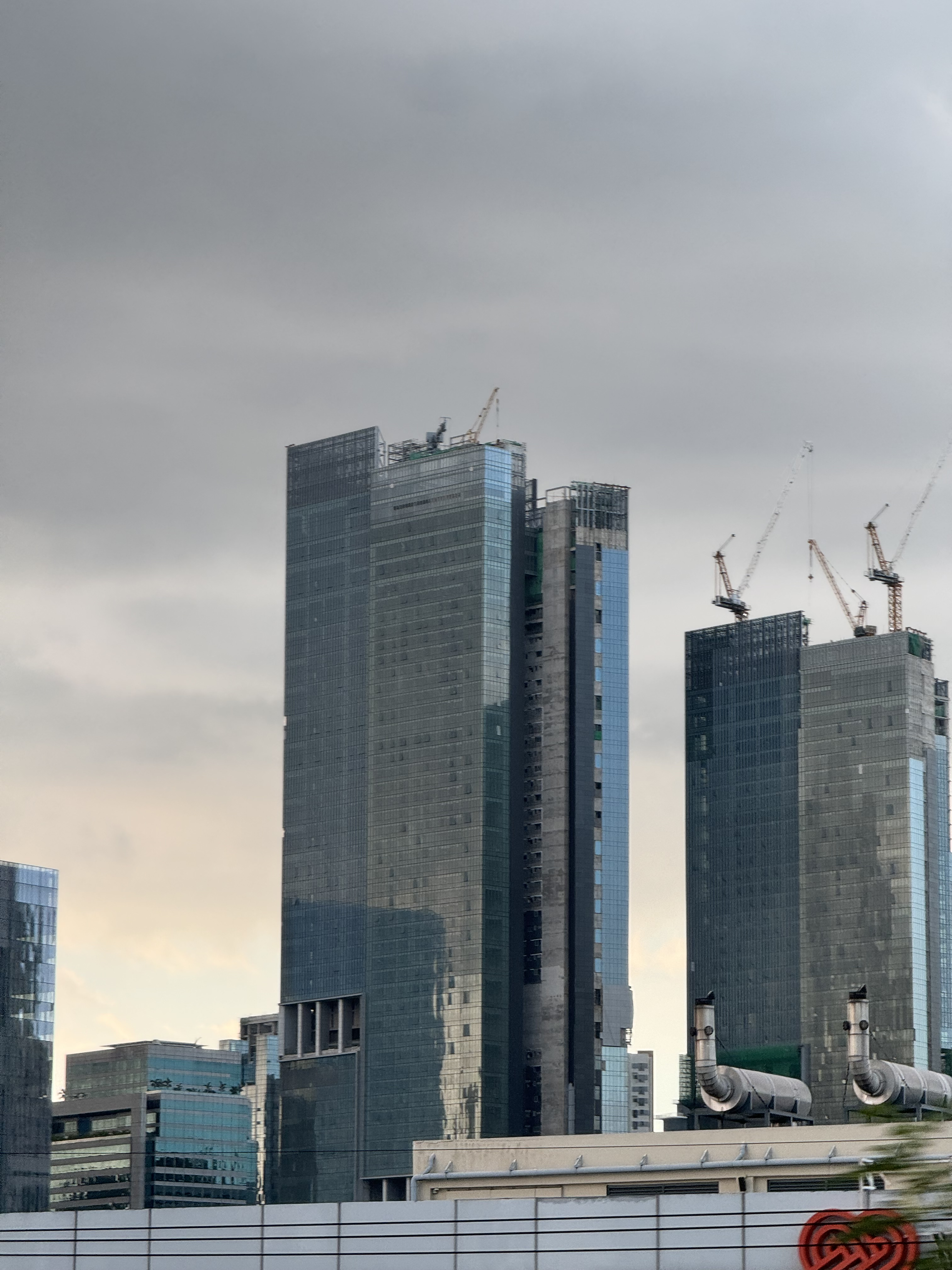
- Park Central Towers in 2023.
- Interactive map of the Park Central Towers area

General information
- Status: Completed
- Type: Residential
- Location: Makati Avenue, Makati, Philippines
- Coordinates: 14°33′34″N 121°01′39″E
- Opening: 2025

Technical details
- Floor count: South Tower - 69; North Tower - 56

Design and construction
- Architecture firm: SCDA Design; Leandro V. Locsin Partners
- Developer: Ayala Land
- Main contractor: Makati Development Corporation

Website
- ayalalandpremier.com/our-portfolio/park-central-towers/

The Park Central Towers is a complex of two skyscrapers in Makati, Metro Manila, Philippines.

== History ==
The Park Central Towers were publicly announced in August 2016 by its developer Ayala Land, replacing the Mandarin Oriental Manila, which was relocated to a new structure across the street. Park Central Towers was placed under the Ayala Land Premier brand.

The first building to be built was the Park Central South Tower. The South Tower was topped out on October 21, 2022.. It was completed in 2024. The North Tower was topped out in 2023, and was completed in 2025.

== Architecture and design ==
The Park Central Towers are composed of the 69-storey North Tower with a height of 248 metres (814 ft) and the 56-storey South Tower. Its exterior design was designed by Singaporean firm SCDA Design by Soo Chan, in collaboration with Philippine firm Leandro V. Locsin Partners. The residential towers' interiors were designed by J. Antonio Mendoza Design Consultants, Asuncion Berenguer Inc. in collaboration with Studio Taku Shimizu for the retail podium’s interiors, Q-Works for environmental graphics, Ace and Associates for security, and BCL Asia for landscaping.
