= Paseo de Roxas =

Avenue in Makati, Philippines

Coordinates: 14°33′13″N 121°1′10″E

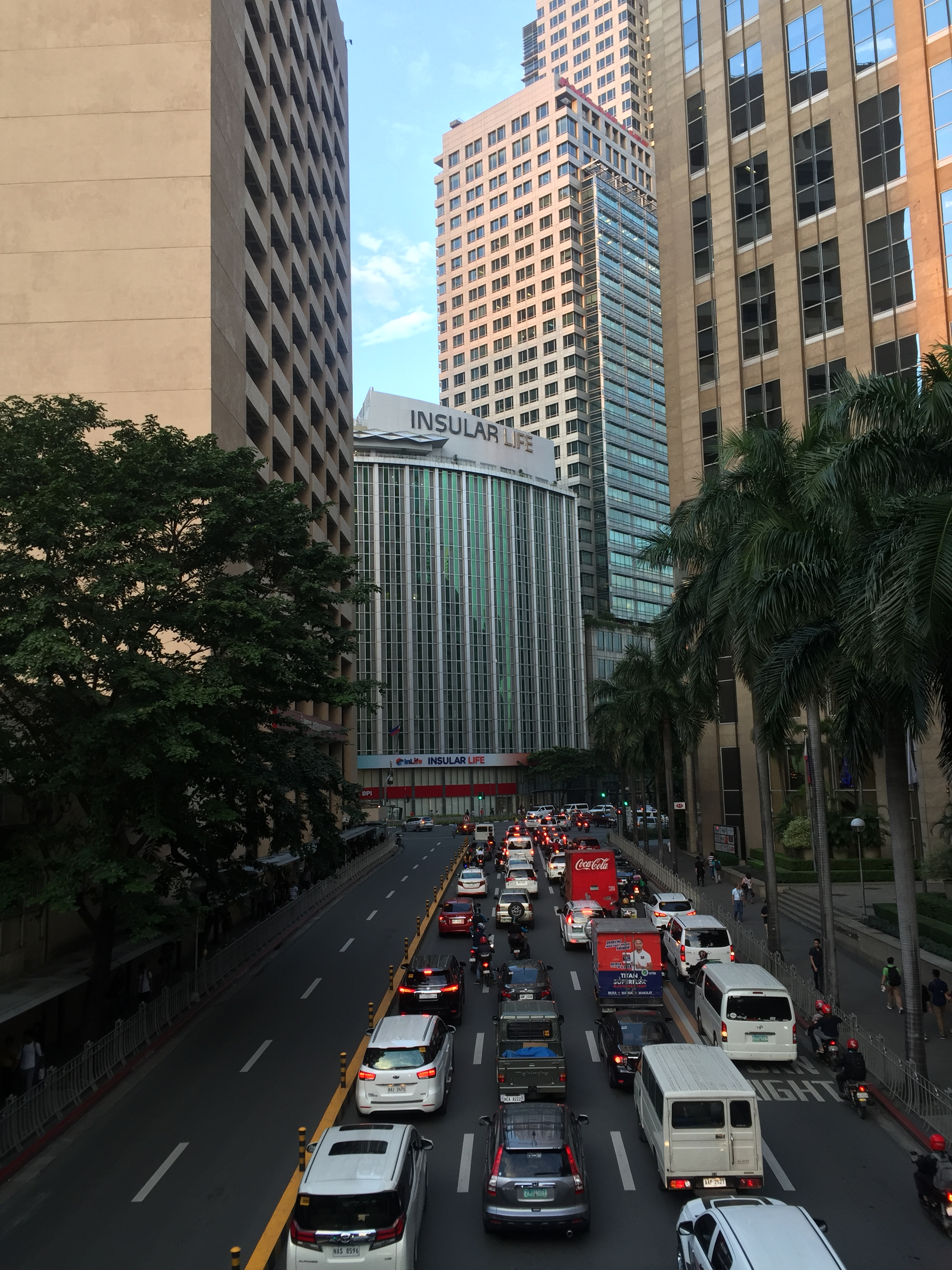
- Paseo de Roxas in Legazpi Village, near its intersection with Ayala Avenue
- Interactive map of Paseo de Roxas
- Namesake: Domingo Róxas
- Length: 2.15 km (1.34 mi)
- Location: Makati, Metro Manila
- From: Arnaiz Avenue in Barangay San Lorenzo
- Major junctions: Legazpi Street; De la Rosa Street; Ayala Avenue; Makati Avenue; N190 (Gil Puyat Avenue); Jupiter Street
- To: Mercedes & Hydra Streets in Bel-Air Village

Paseo de Roxas is a prime commercial artery in the Makati Central Business District of Metro Manila, Philippines. It is a two- to six-lane avenue that cuts through the middle of the business district, connecting San Lorenzo Village in the west to Bel-Air Village in the east.

Starting at its western terminus at Arnaiz Avenue (formerly Pasay Road), the road crosses into Legaspi Village, passing by the Greenbelt complex, the Asian Institute of Management, and several low- to mid-rise office and residential towers. As it passes by Salcedo Village east of Ayala Avenue, the buildings give way to high rises on the north side and the entire length of the Ayala Triangle Gardens on the south. Past the intersection with Makati Avenue, Paseo de Roxas skirts the northern side of Urdaneta Village. It then crosses Gil Puyat Avenue and Jupiter Street before entering the gated Bel-Air Village, ending at its intersection with Mercedes and Hydra Streets.

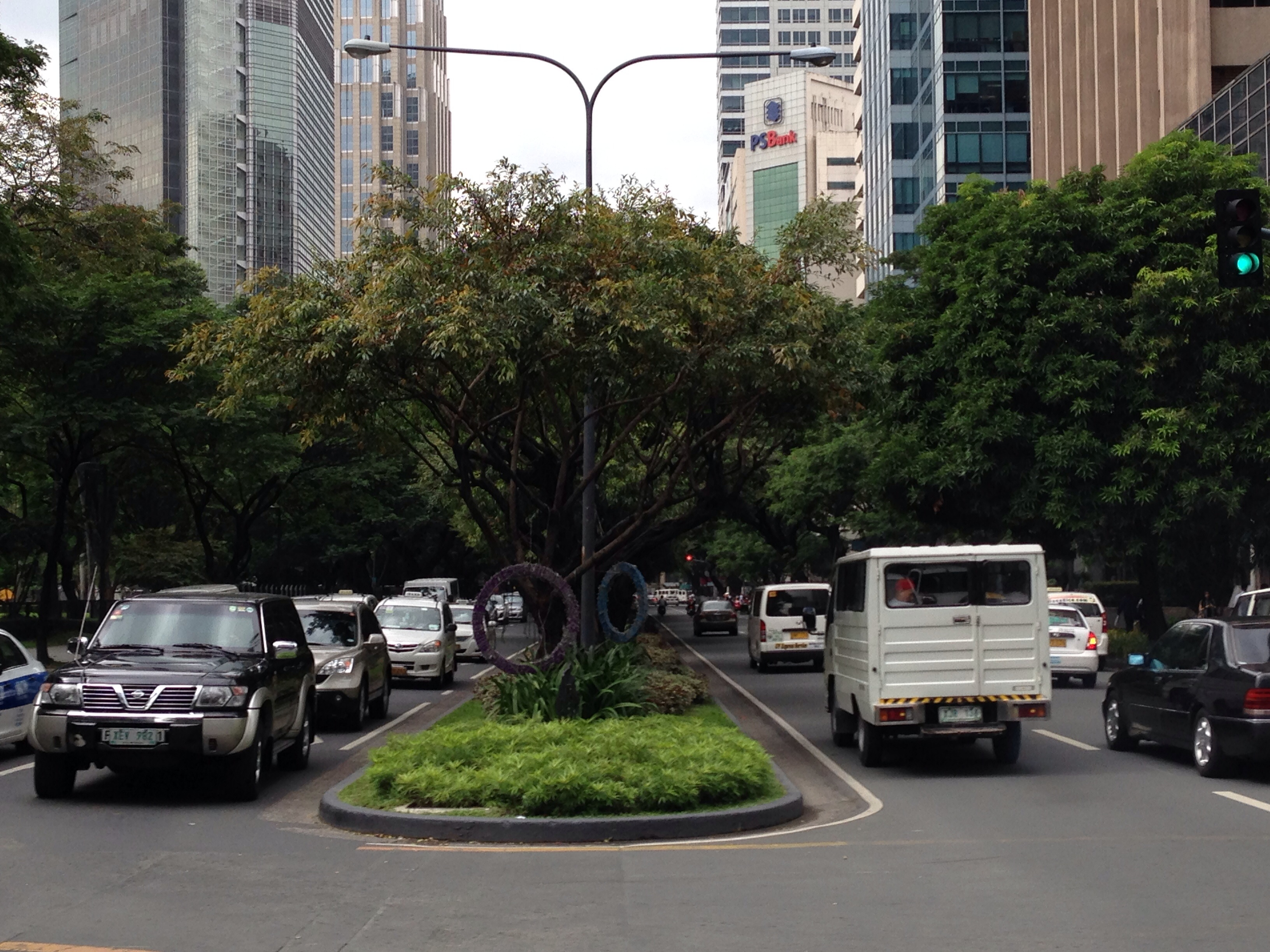
Another shot of Paseo de Roxas

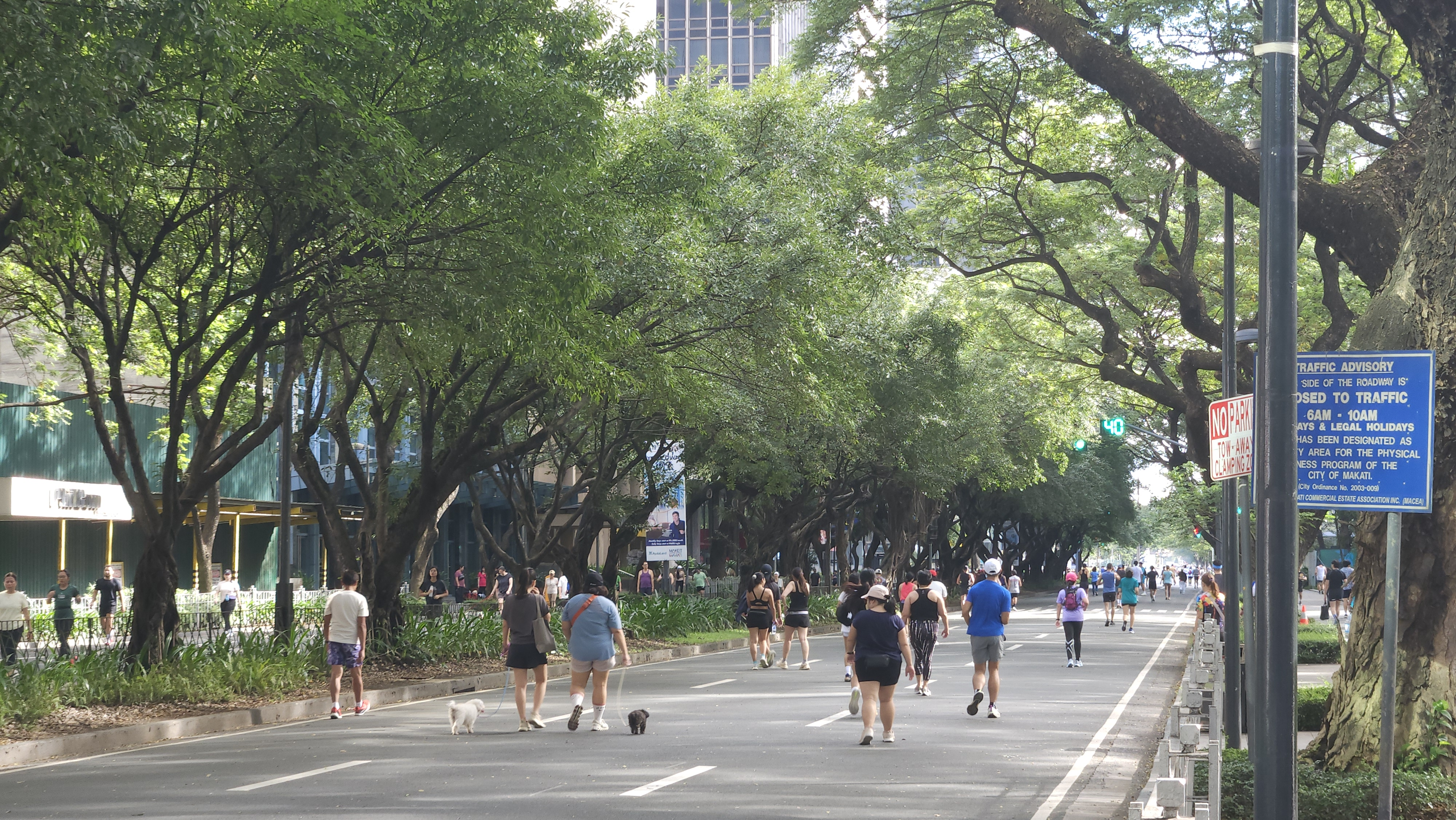
Jogging and strolling along Paseo de Roxas during Car-Free Sundays

The avenue was named after Ayala Corporation founder Domingo Róxas of the Zobel de Ayala family, who owns the land. It was the site of the old Nielson Field airport, where the avenue's section east of Ayala Avenue served as a runway along with Ayala Avenue. Paseo de Roxas also has short extensions into the gated San Lorenzo Village as Edades Street and the gated Bel-Air Village as Hydra Street.

The Department of the Interior and Local Government designated Paseo de Roxas as one of Metro Manila's freedom parks in 2006.

== Intersections ==
The entire route is located in Makati.

km	mi	Destinations	Notes
		Arnaiz Avenue	Southern terminus. Traffic light intersection. Continues south into San Lorenzo Village as Edades Street.
		Benavidez Street	Traffic light intersection, entry to Paseo de Roxas only
		Esperanza Street	Traffic light intersection; Access to Greenbelt complex.
		Gamboa Street	Traffic light intersection, one-way road towards Rada Street.
		Legazpi Street	Traffic light intersection, no left turn allowed from northbound and no right turn from southbound.
		Gallardo Street	Northbound exit only
		Perea Street	Northbound entrance only
		Nieva Street	Northbound exit only
		De la Rosa Street	Traffic light intersection; one-way road towards Makati Medical Center and no left turn allowed from southbound.
		Ayala Avenue	Traffic light intersection
		Sedeño Street	Traffic light intersection, one-way entrance to Paseo de Roxas
		Villar Street	Traffic light intersection, one-way exit from Paseo de Roxas
		Makati Avenue	Traffic light intersection
		Santa Potenciana Street	Access to Urdaneta Village.
		Cruzada Street	
		N190 (Sen. Gil Puyat Avenue)	Traffic light intersection.
		Jupiter Street	Start of village restrictions.
		Mercedes Street	Northern terminus. Continues north as Hydra Street.
1.000 mi = 1.609 km; 1.000 km = 0.621 mi: Incomplete access

== Notable landmarks ==
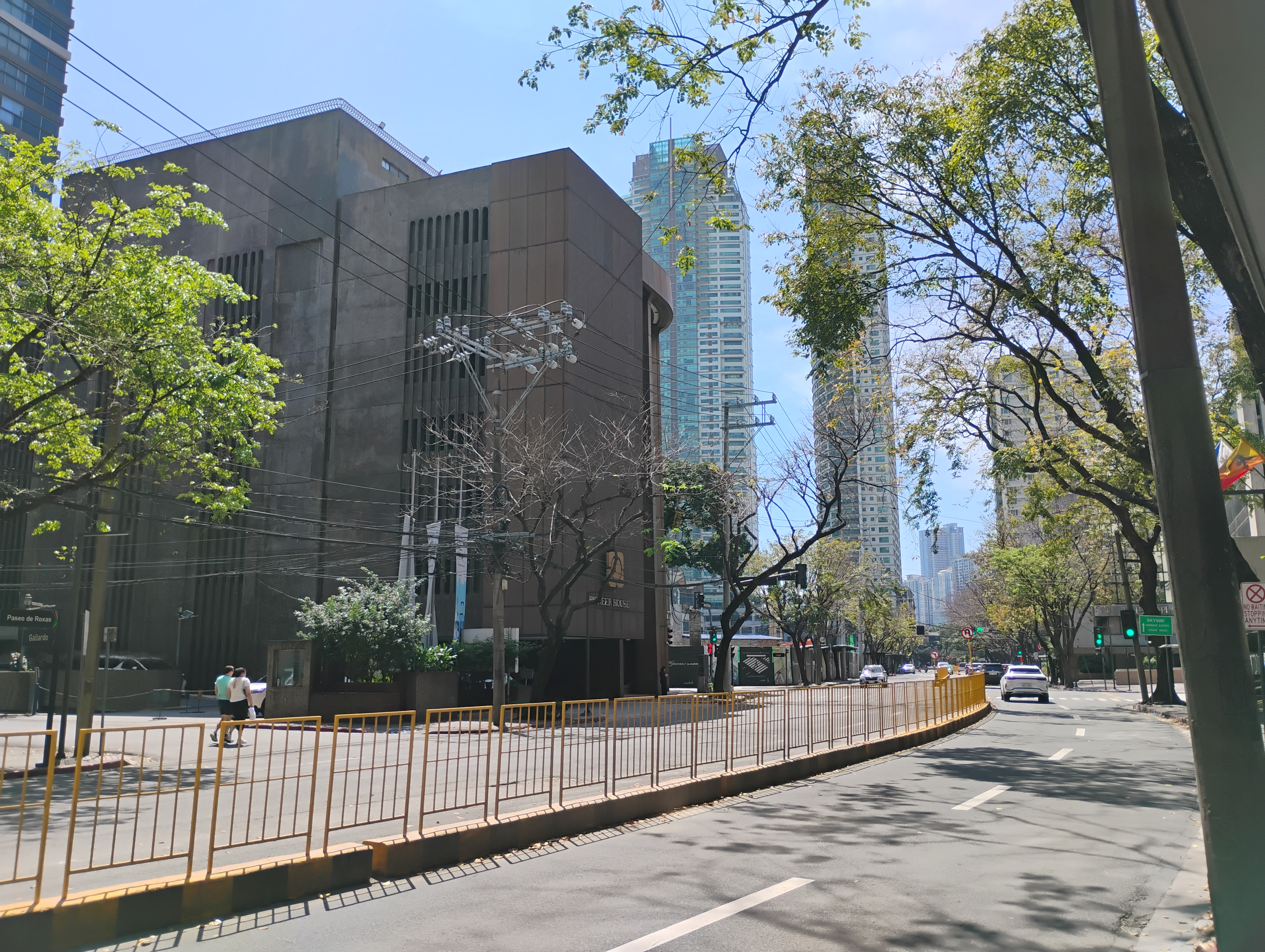
Paseo de Roxas in Legaspi Village

Paseo de Roxas is the address of the Asian Institute of Management, which occupies a full block on the north side of the street between Benavidez and Gamboa Streets across from Greenbelt. The street also hosts the headquarters of several banks, notably the Bank of the Philippine Islands (BPI), Chinabank, and PSBank. The intersection of Paseo de Roxas and Ayala Avenue is framed by The Enterprise Center Tower 1, Ayala Tower One, the former site of the BPI Building (to be replaced by the future BPI Headquarters) and Insular Life Building which featured the Philippine Stock Exchange LED Display, the first and longest curved-type LED display in Southeast Asia.

Paseo de Roxas is also home to numerous other skyscrapers such as the AIA Tower, Zuellig Building, One Roxas Triangle, Lepanto Building and The Residences at Greenbelt's Manila Tower. Across the street from the Ayala Triangle Gardens is the Paseo Center, which houses a Marketplace supermarket and a flagship branch of Anytime Fitness.
