= Greenbelt (shopping mall) =

Mall in Metro Manila, Philippines

Greenbelt by Ayala Malls

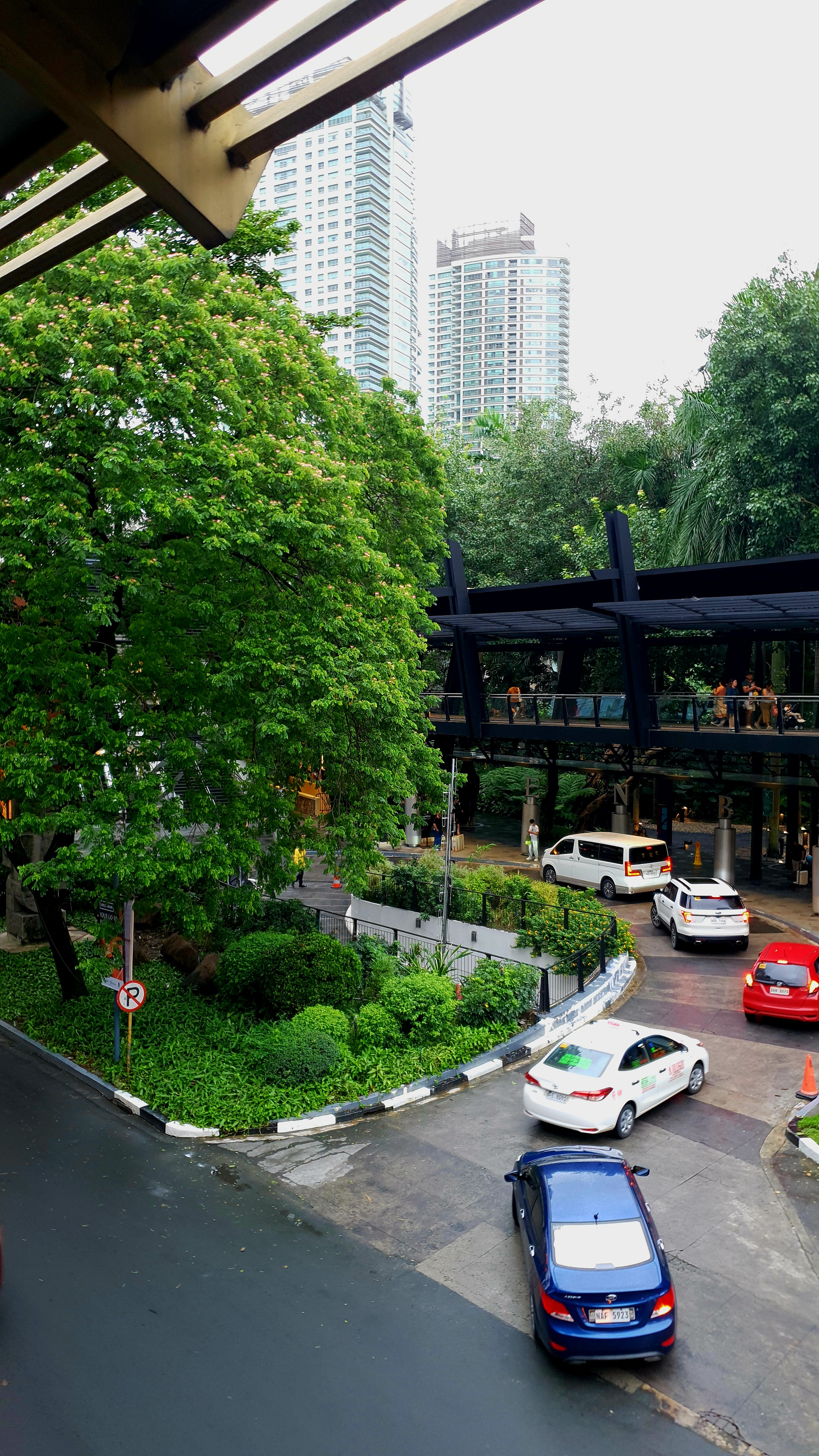
- Greenbelt in 2023
- Location: Ayala Center, San Lorenzo, Makati, Philippines
- Coordinates: 14°33′06.6″N 121°01′19.9″E
- Opened: 1988; 38 years ago
- Developer: Ayala Land
- Manager: Ayala Malls
- Architect: Greenbelt Square (old Greenbelt 1): Leandro Locsin; Old Greenbelt 1: Leandro V. Locsin Partners; Center Mall (old Greenbelt 1): WV Coscolluela & Associates; Greenbelt 2 to 4: Callison, GF & Partners (associate), and Edward D. Stone & Associates (landscape); Greenbelt 5: GF & Partners; New Greenbelt 1: Gensler
- Num. of stores: 300+
- Floor area: 250,000 m^{2} (2,700,000 sq ft)
- Floors: Mall: 5 (maximum) (Note: The mall consists of Levels 1 to 4 and Lower Ground Level.); Greenbelt Townhomes: 3 (maximum); Basement Parking: 1
- Parking: 2000+ cars
- Website: Greenbelt Website

Greenbelt (also known as Greenbelt by Ayala Malls) is a large shopping mall located at Ayala Center, Makati, Metro Manila, Philippines. It records about 50,000 daily visitors. It is owned by Ayala Malls, a real-estate subsidiary of Ayala Land, which is an affiliate of Ayala Corporation. It opened in 1988 after merging existing structures and is one of the Ayala Corporation's flagship projects. Since 2025, it is the oldest operating Ayala Mall after Ayala Land sold its stake in Alabang Town Center to the Madrigal Group.The mall offers a mix of high-end retail shops, restaurants, amenities, leisure and entertainment. Currently, the mall has five sections and an urban park with a Roman Catholic chapel at the center.

== History ==
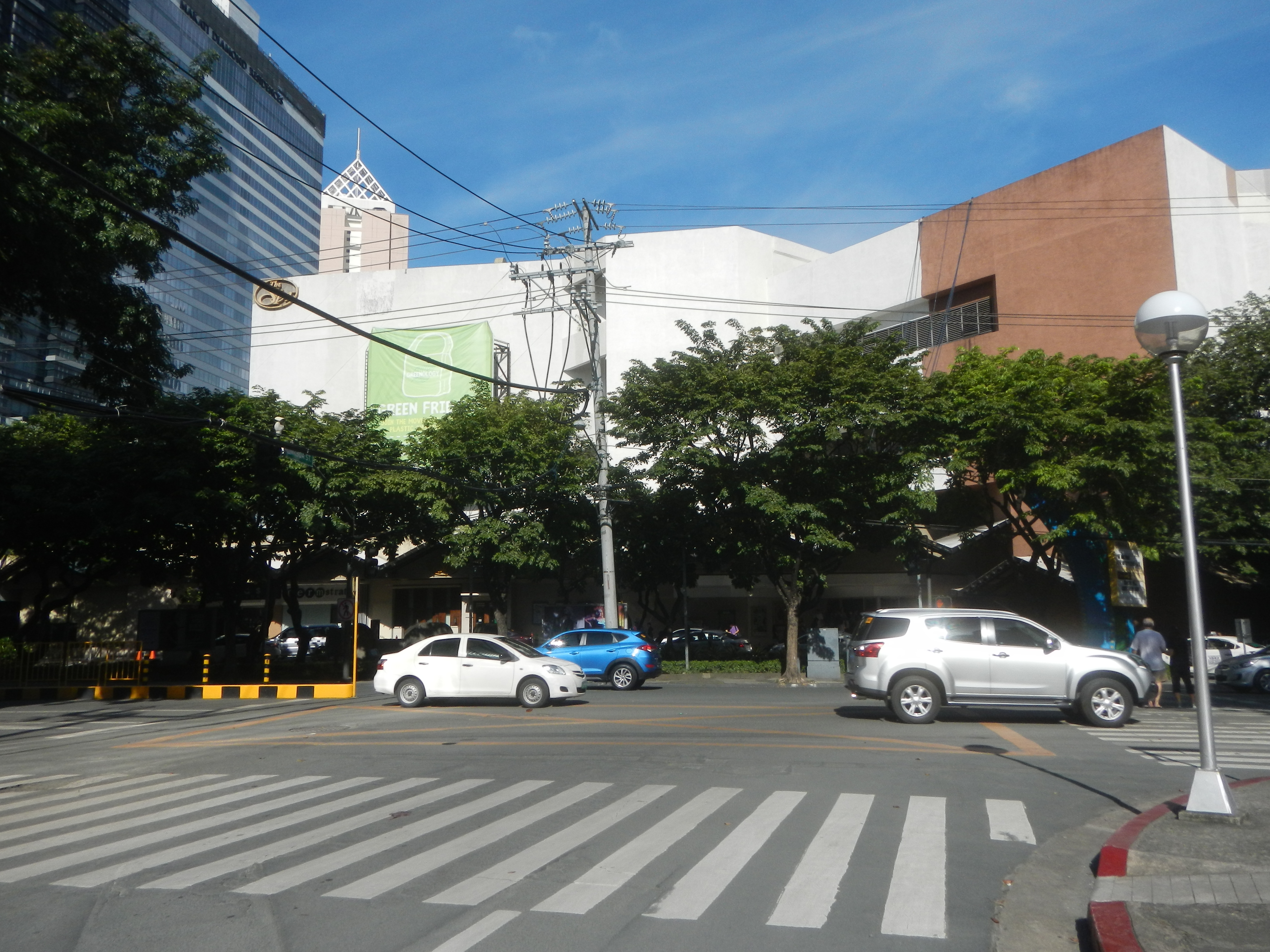
The old Greenbelt 1, captured from Gamboa Street, featuring the component Brutalist structure formerly known as Greenbelt Square.

=== Origin ===
The origin of Greenbelt could be traced to the 1970s as an open-space park also known as Greenbelt Junction, which had an aviary and was surrounded by low-rise structures featuring various dining establishments and the United Supermart. The park underwent renovations, followed by the inauguration of the Santo Niño de Paz Greenbelt Chapel on the park in 1983 and the decommissioning of the aviary later that decade.

In 1982, Greenbelt Square, a three-story Brutalist building containing retail spaces and four cinemas (two of which were later converted into the OnStage performing arts theater and the ArtFilm Theater for non-commercial films) was opened. The building was designed by Leandro Locsin, who would later be named as a National Artist for Architecture. Structures that were later added are:

- Fair Center, a three-story department store opened in 1983, later known as Shop & Lift Plaza;
- Greenbelt Arcade, a two-story shopping arcade opened in 1985;
- McDonald's Greenbelt branch, the Philippine franchise's 9th store opened in 1985; and
- Greenbelt Mall, a three-story building with parking spaces, boutiques, and shops, opened in 1987.

=== As an Ayala Mall ===
The park, aforementioned buildings, and open parking area collectively formed the retail complex known as Greenbelt, officially opening as such in 1988 as the second Ayala Mall. Real estate company Ayala Land conceptualized Greenbelt as the Philippines's first lifestyle center with bars, posh boutiques, lush tropical greenery, a world-class museum, and an elegant chapel. In the 1990s, Greenbelt, along with the adjacent Makati Commercial Center, was integrated into the Ayala Center. Greenbelt underwent enhancements, starting with the construction of the indoor Center Mall from 1989 to 1994 and the renovation in 1994 that added wheelchair ramps.

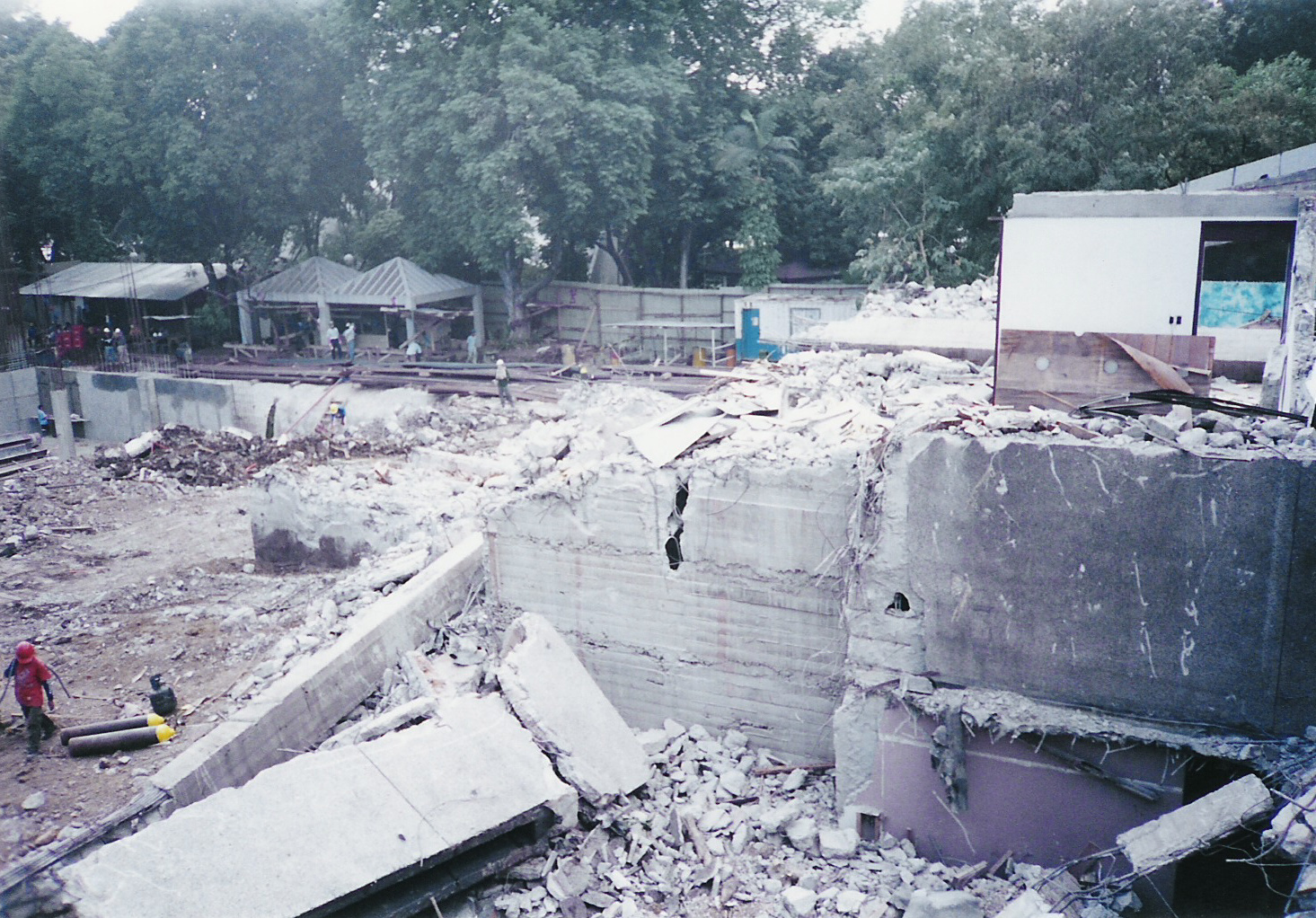
Demolition of the old Ayala Museum in 2001, which later became the site of Greenbelt 4, opened in 2004.

The mall later underwent a major expansion project, with planning beginning in the late 1990s. As a result, the original wing was renamed Greenbelt 1 in 2000. This redevelopment included the expansion of Greenbelt Park and the addition of the Paseo Steel Parking and new wings. Greenbelt 2 and 3 broke ground in October 2000 and opened in May and June 2002, respectively, with Greenbelt 3 introducing five additional cinemas and the MyCinema private mini-theater to the mall complex. Greenbelt 4 broke ground in March 2002 and opened in November 2003 on the former site of the Ayala Museum, which had relocated next to the new wing and was constructed from 2001 to 2004. Finally, Greenbelt 5 broke ground in 2006 and opened in 2007. Demolition of surrounding structures, including United Supermarket, Garden Square Building, Shop & Lift Plaza, Greenbelt Arcade, and Greenbelt 1's service driveways occurred until 2006, mostly due to expired contracts, making way for these developments.

Logo from 2007 to 2026

The mall underwent major redevelopment, with the ground level of Greenbelt 3 closed in 2019. The new area reopened in October 2021, which now hosts luxury labels and a newly renovated Starbucks Reserve cafe. Greenbelt 4 was later renovated from the third quarter of 2022 to its reopening in April 2023.

==== Future redevelopment ====
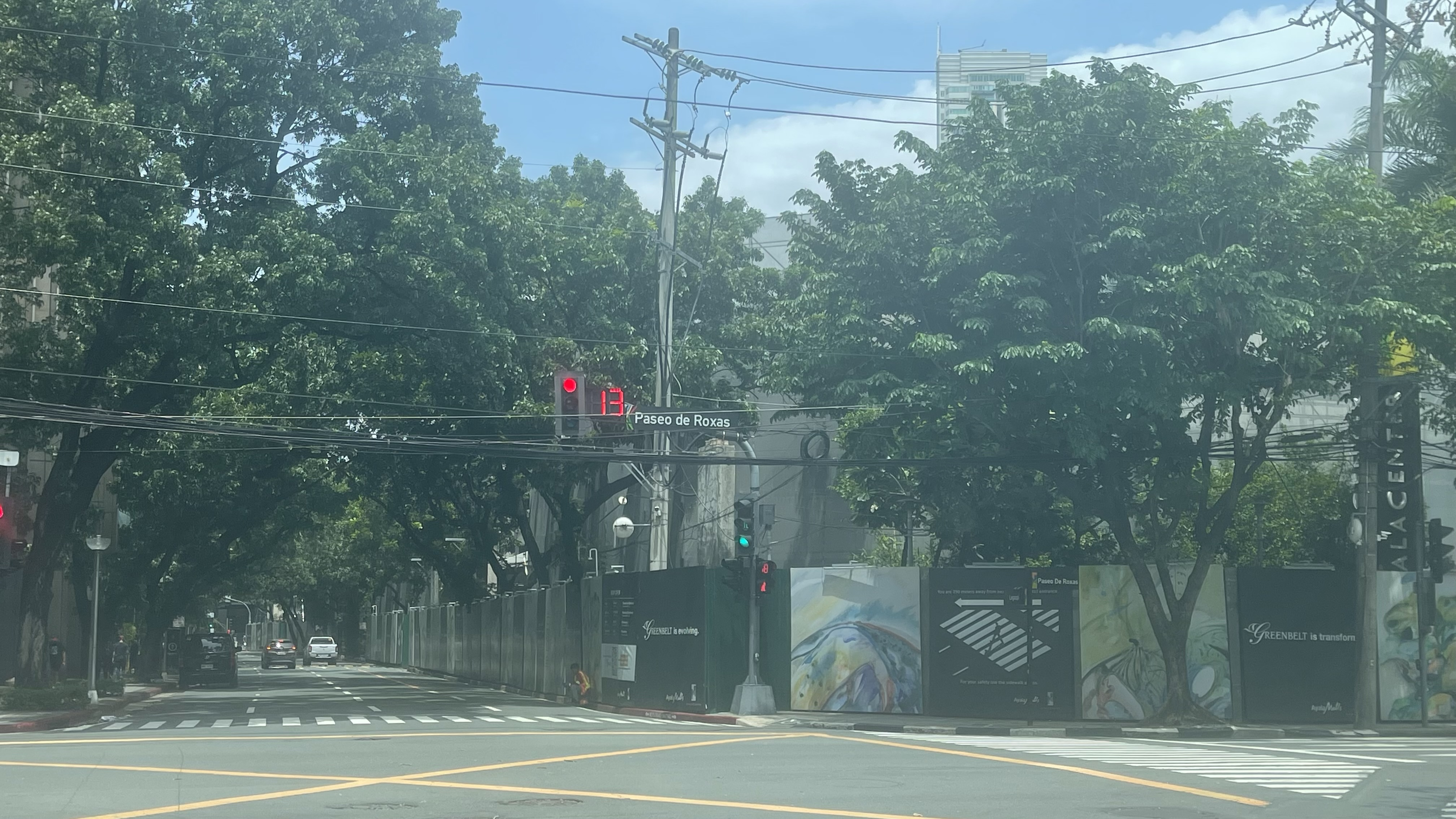
Greenbelt 1 being demolished in July 2024 as part of a major redevelopment

On July 25, 2023, Ayala Land filed a Petition to Remove the Presumption as Important Cultural Property designation from Greenbelt 1 before the National Commission for Culture and the Arts, arguing that alterations made to the original structure as a result of renovations over the past decades had made the building unrecognizable from its original design.

Greenbelt 1 and 2 are undergoing another major redevelopment, costing ₱13 billion, since the first quarter of 2024. Ayala Malls has tapped San Francisco-based architectural firm Gensler for the redesign of Greenbelt. Greenbelt 1's redevelopment is also funded by a fraction of a ₱12.87 billion (US$225 million) loan by Ayala Land from the International Finance Corporation. Greenbelt 2's ground level was closed in January 2024 for renovation converting its al fresco dining area into retail spaces, officially reopening in July 2026. Greenbelt 1 was later closed on April 1, 2024, for its eventual demolition alongside the Paseo Steel Parking. It will be replaced by a newer complex that will include a hotel, office spaces, a larger cinema complex, a four-level shopping mall with four parking levels beneath, and possibly a new park expected to open in 2028. The Greenbelt 3 Cinemas were also renovated in 2025, closing temporarily from February to their reopening on December 17. As part of the upgrade, Cinema 4 was converted into an A-Luxe theater. Despite the mall's renovation, McDonald's Greenbelt would remain open, with their lease extended until 2027 and drive-thru lanes also undergoing renovation.

== Features ==
Greenbelt, located in Ayala Center, has a gross floor area (GFA) of 250,000 m^{2} (2,700,000 sq ft), making it the thirteenth largest shopping mall in the Philippines in terms of GFA, tied with Glorietta. Its lot is bounded by Legazpi Street, De la Rosa Street, Makati Avenue, Esperanza Street, and Paseo de Roxas.

=== Retail Wings ===
Greenbelt consists of five separate retail wings and the Ayala Museum that encloses a central garden, Greenbelt Park, which contains the Santo Niño de Paz Greenbelt Chapel and is bisected by Greenbelt Drive. As of 2024, Greenbelt 2 to 5 are interconnected through walkways on their respective second levels. The walkways also connect Greenbelt to nearby landmarks: from between Greenbelt 5 and the Ayala Museum to the De la Rosa Elevated Walkway, from Greenbelt 4 to The Landmark Makati, and from Greenbelt 2 to The Residences at Greenbelt.

==== Greenbelt 1 ====
Prior to its closure on April 1, 2024, Greenbelt 1 featured lifestyle, food, and supply stores, as well as the Expo Exchange exhibition hall, two cinemas, and the OnStage Theater. two cinemas, and the OnStage Theater, a performing arts theater that hosted Repertory Philippines from 2002 to 2024. It was also the location of The Marketplace supermarket, National Book Store and an Automatic Centre branch.

The reconstructed Greenbelt 1 will feature new spaces for flagship stores.

==== Greenbelt 2 ====
Greenbelt 2 features the Greenbelt Townhomes, a two- to three-story condominium on top, and high-end boutiques on the ground level. Prior to its renovation from 2024 to 2026, it featured high-end al fresco restaurants on the ground level.

==== Greenbelt 3 ====
Greenbelt 3 has four retail levels, featuring a mix of international brands including luxury labels at the ground level's indoor area. Sit-down restaurants with al fresco dining are situated in the outdoor units of the ground level, directly facing Greenbelt Park. The upper levels offer a diverse mix of retail, entertainment, and further dining options. Notably, Greenbelt 3 houses six cinemas, including an A-Luxe theater, the Philippines' third 4DX cinema (launched in 2016), and MyCinema (a premium private mini-theater).

The largest Philippine branch of Louis Vuitton and the country's only Hermès boutique is found here.

==== Greenbelt 4 ====
Greenbelt 4 features high-end boutiques on its enclosed ground level. On the second and third levels is an H&M branch. Greenbelt 4's second level hallway serves as a rear access to the Ayala Museum and an extension of the Dela Rosa Elevated Walkway connecting the latter to The Landmark, the rest of Greenbelt, and Ayala Center.

==== Greenbelt 5 ====
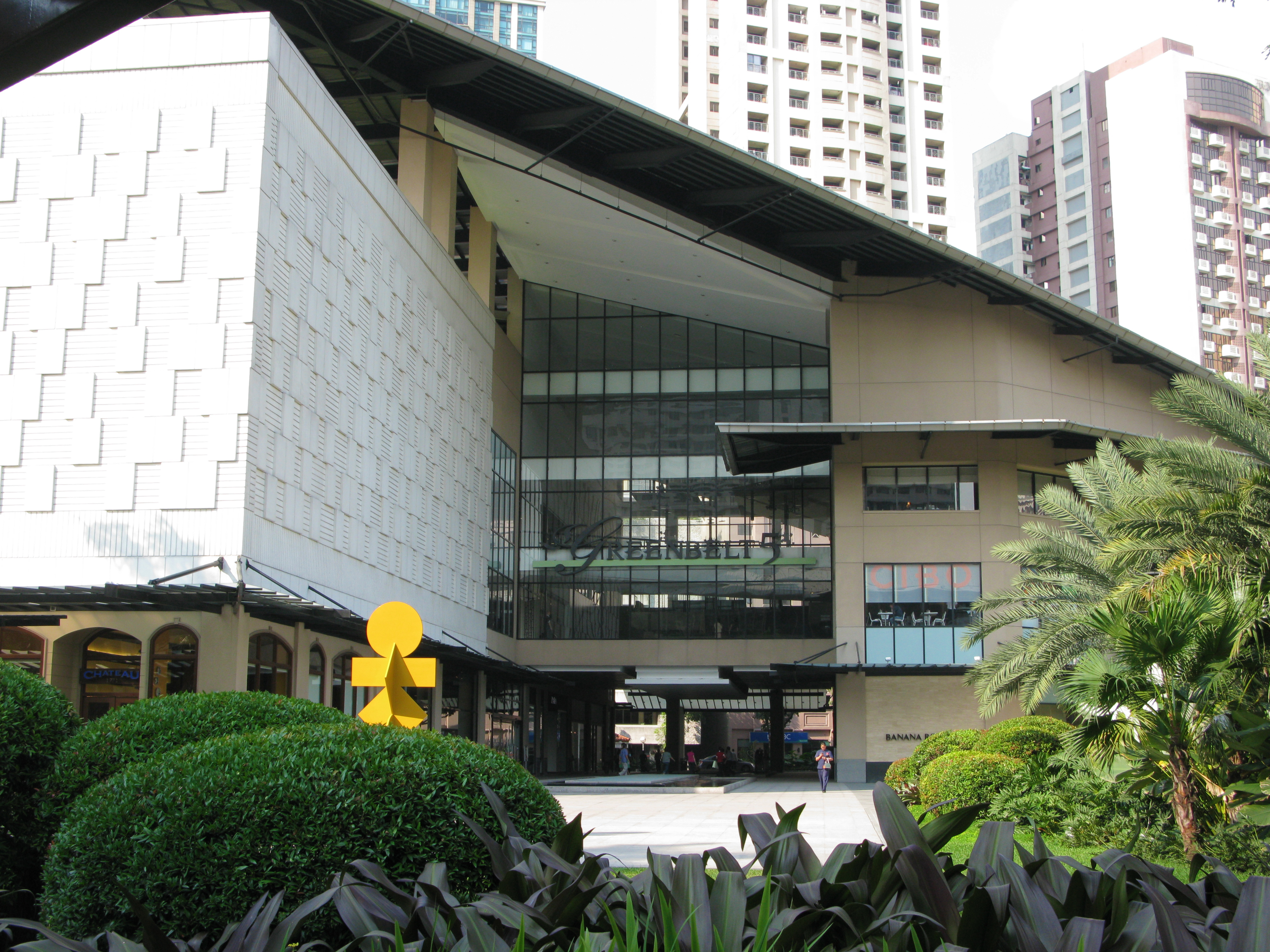
Façade of Greenbelt 5

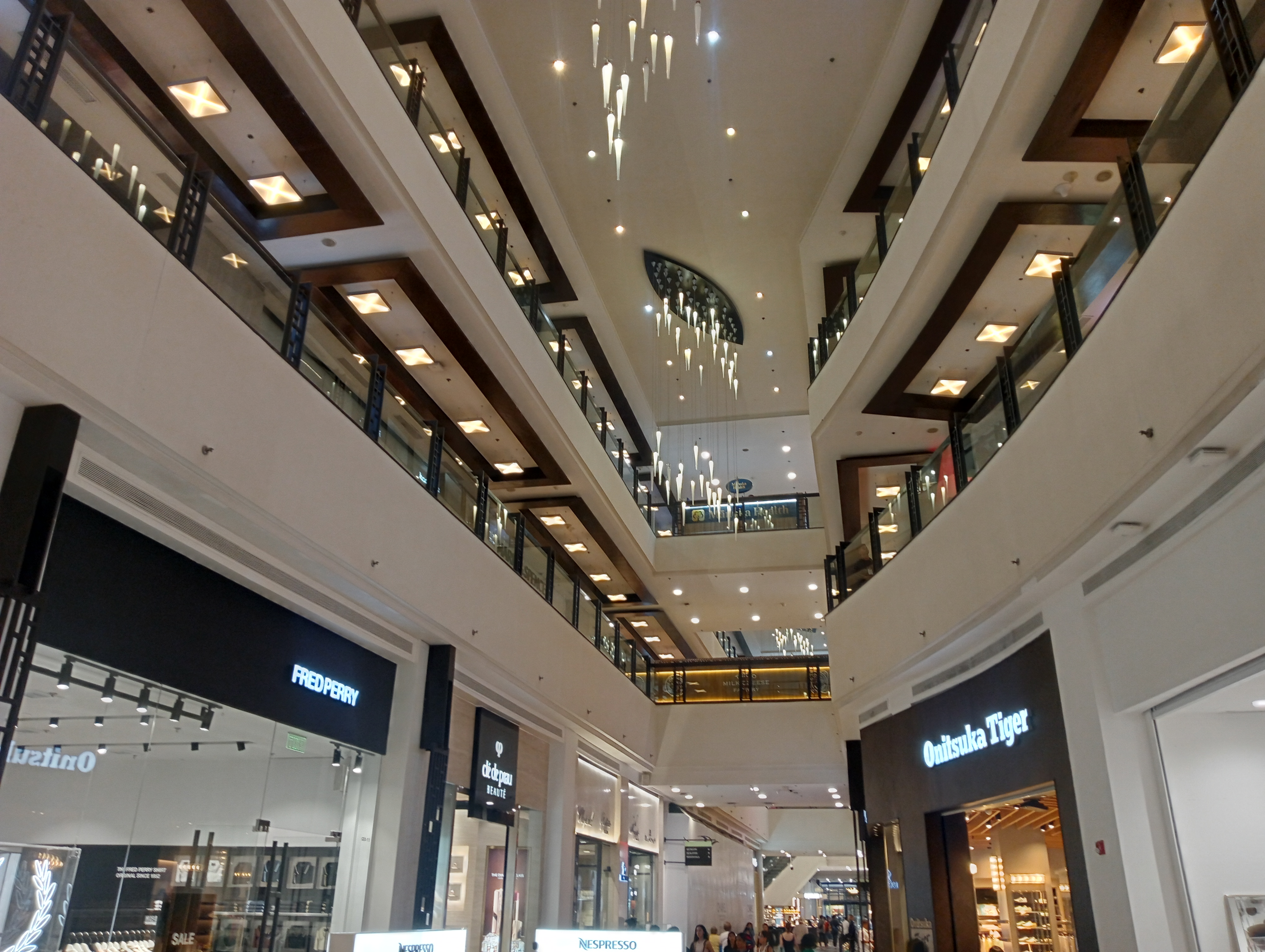
Interior of Greenbelt 5

Greenbelt 5 is the largest wing, divided into 2 sections: Phase 1 and Phase 2. Phase 1 has 3 retail levels, houses boutiques of Filipino designers, luxury boutiques, art galleries, and restaurants. Phase 2, with 5 levels of retail space, one underground and four over ground, features the high-end department store Adora, entertainment facilities, luxury boutiques and restaurants. Phase 2's underground level connects to Greenbelt Drive beneath Greenbelt Park. The garden facing side of Greenbelt 5's ground level is lined with sit in restaurants with al fresco seats. Both phases are connected through an elevated atrium that is used for events.

The design of Greenbelt 5's façade facing Greenbelt Park was inspired by a fabric woven by the T'boli people.

=== Restaurants ===
Restaurants are located in Greenbelt 3 and 5, as well as in Greenbelt 2 until its ground-level dining spaces were closed for renovations in 2024, while Greenbelt 1 concentrated more on fast food until it closed in 2024. The complex is also home to a colony of well-fed cats who lounge around walkways and in unoccupied al fresco cafe seats.

=== Parking ===
Greenbelt is served by an interconnected basement parking built beneath it, as well as the above-ground carpark inside Greenbelt 2.

Former parking facilities at Greenbelt were the Paseo Steel Parking at the corner of Paseo de Roxas and Esperanza Street, Greenbelt 1 (the portion initially known as Greenbelt Mall), and an open parking area, all above-ground. The open parking area has since been replaced by new wings in early 2000s, while Paseo Steel Parking was interconnected with the parking in Greenbelt 2 until its demolition in 2024 as part of a redevelopment that also involved the demolition of Greenbelt 1.

=== Santo Niño de Paz Greenbelt Chapel ===
Santo Niño de Paz Greenbelt Chapel

Santo Niño de Paz Greenbelt Chapel is a Roman Catholic place of worship in Greenbelt Park at the complex's center. It is under the mission station of the same name of the Roman Catholic Archdiocese of Manila. Built as an open-air, concrete dome in the middle of a pond, the chapel holds masses and other religious services every day. It celebrates its titular feast day every third Sunday of January. It was inaugurated on July 28, 1983, and designed by architects William Fernandez and Jess Dizon. Additionally, glass sculptor Ramon Orlina contributed to the design by creating the tabernacle altar, the cross at one of the entrances, among others. Additionally, ceiling art was made by painter Jermaine Alvarez.

=== Transportation links ===
Point-to-point (P2P) bus stops are also located on Legazpi Street, just beside Greenbelt 5 and, formerly, Greenbelt 1, respectively. Additionally, a jeepney terminal and another P2P bus stop is located at The Landmark, adjacent to Greenbelt across Makati Avenue. Greenbelt can be accessed through MRT 3 through Ayala Center's elevated pedestrian connections between its malls and Ayala station.

== Incidents ==
On October 18, 2009, between 11:45 a.m. and 1 p.m. PHT, heavily armed thieves overpowered the mall's security guards and broke into a Rolex watch shop in Greenbelt 5. The thieves, dressed in bomb squad uniforms, hammered the glass cases containing Rolex watches. A suspected robber was killed by two police escorts of Taguig Mayor Sigfrido Tiñga who, incidentally, happened to be present upon the heist while the other gun-men escaped with an undetermined value of expensive watches.

=== Fire incidents ===
- April 15, 2010: A fire broke out from an Indian restaurant in Greenbelt 3 at 6:44 p.m., causing adjacent restaurants and the nearby cinemas to temporarily close.
- July 4, 2016: A fire broke out from a BPI branch in Greenbelt 1 at 9:11 a.m. It reportedly started from the bank's warehouse. It was put out by 3:31 p.m.
- April 9, 2024: A minor fire broke out in Greenbelt 2 at 9:28 a.m., raising it to first alarm two minutes later. It was put out at 9:40 a.m.

== Gallery ==
Santo Niño de Paz Chapel

The Greenbelt park

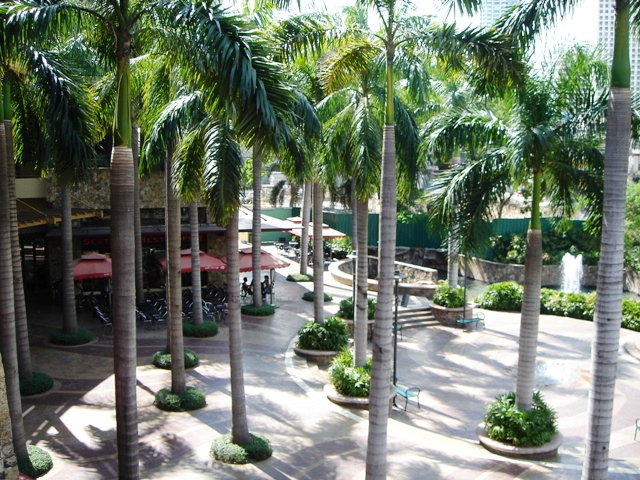
Palm trees at the Greenbelt Park

The Greenbelt Complex

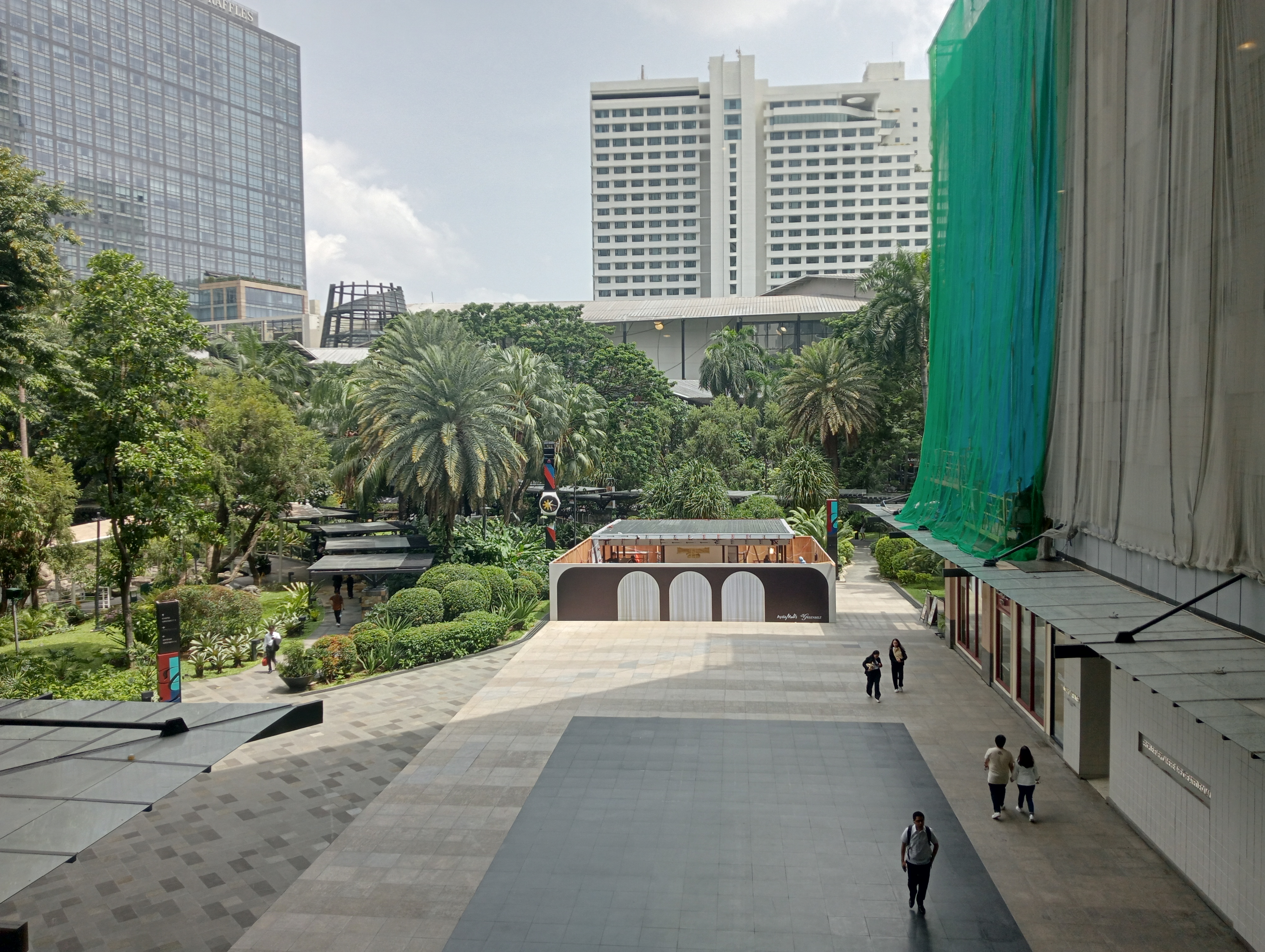
View of Greenbelt Park from Greenbelt 5

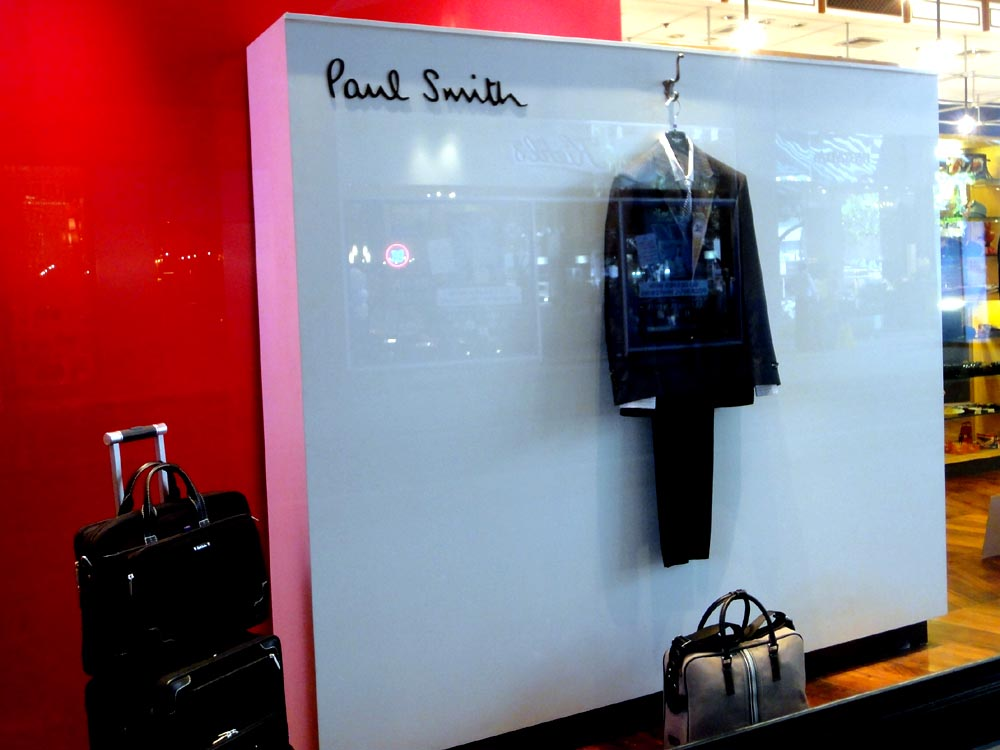
Paul Smith boutique in Greenbelt 5

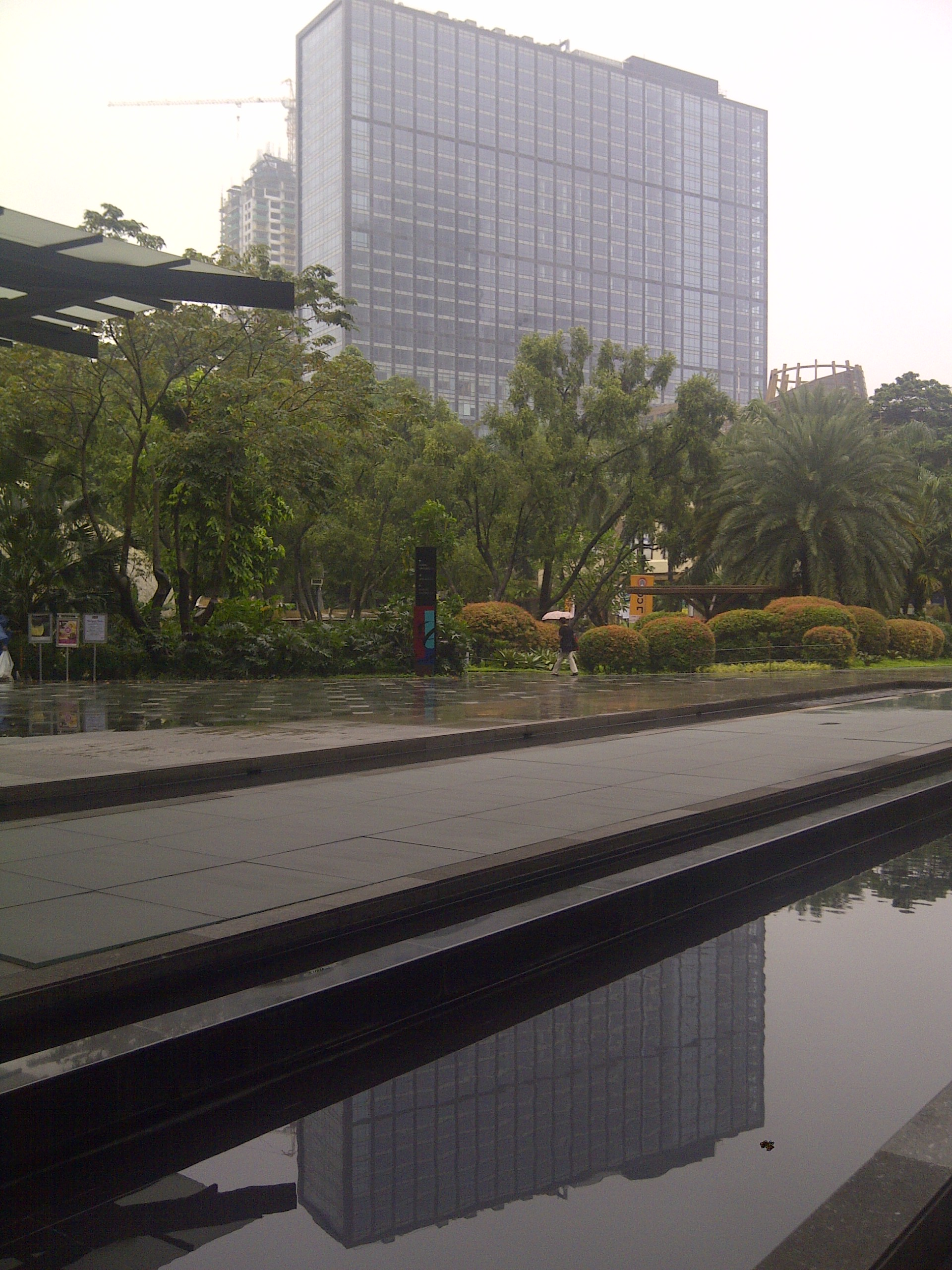
Raffles Hotels & Resorts as seen from Greenbelt

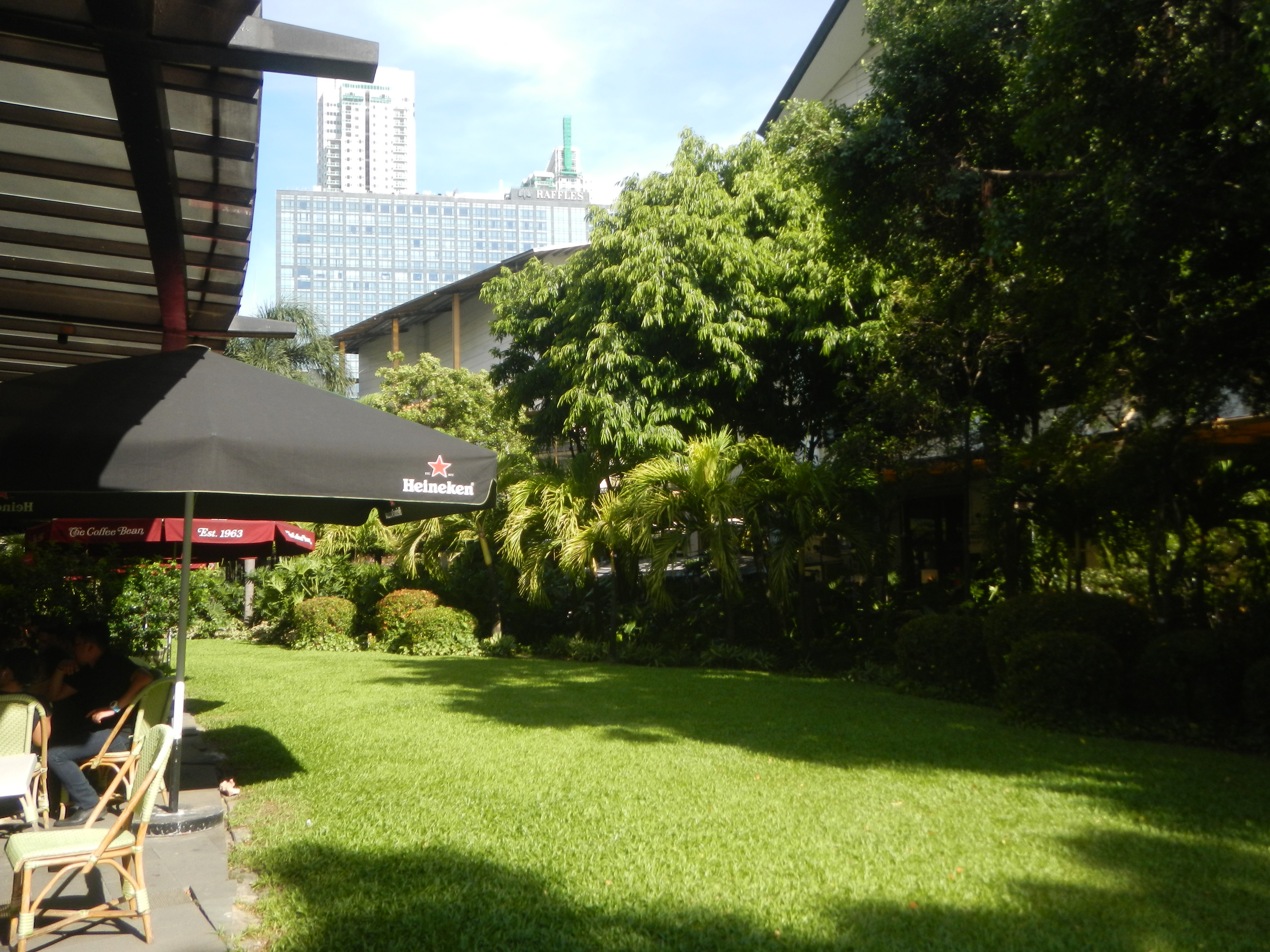
Greenbelt Park and dining

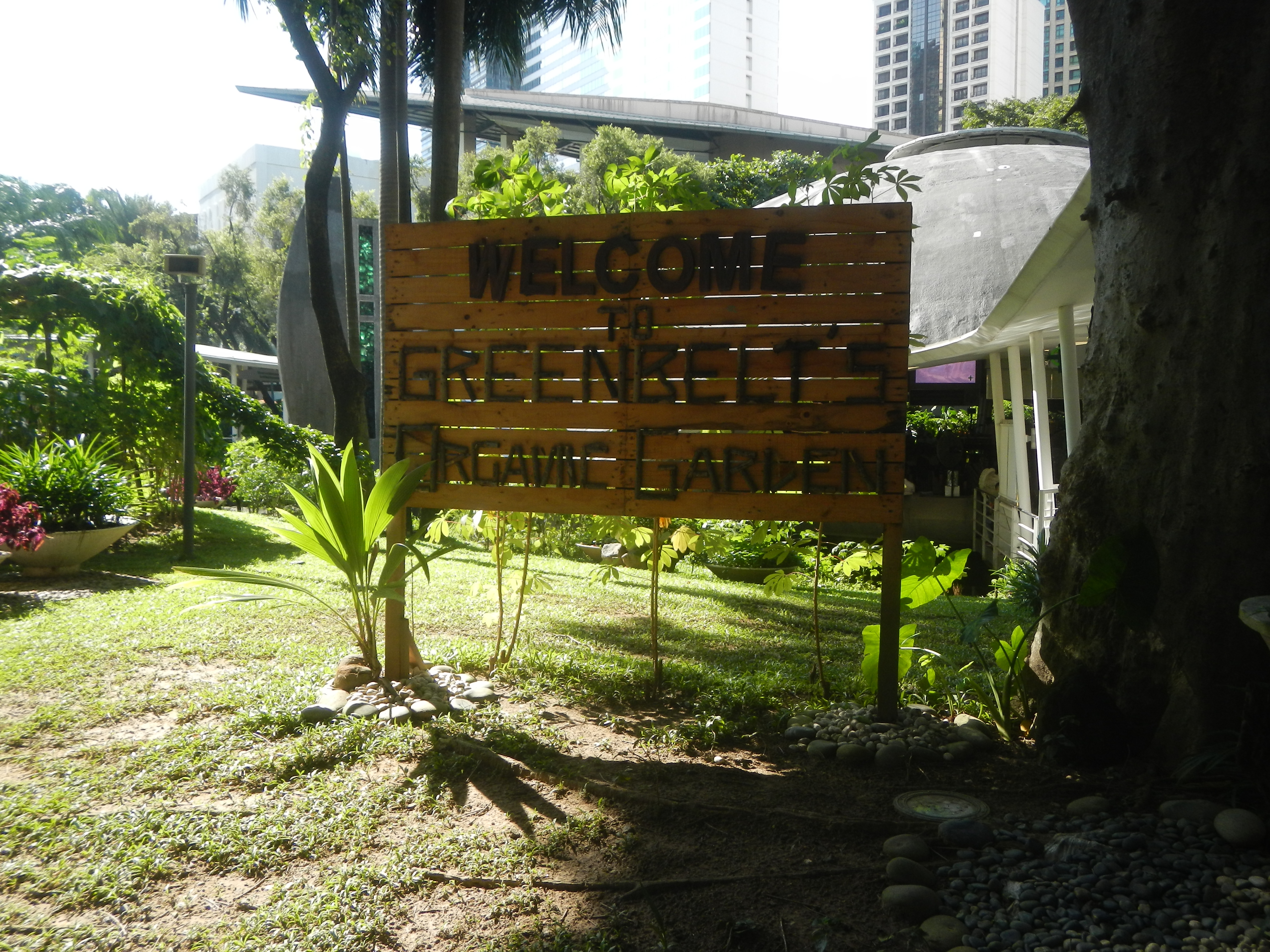
Greenbelt Organic Garden

Façade of Greenbelt 5

Entrance and taxi rank

== See also ==
- List of largest shopping malls
- List of largest shopping malls in the Philippines
- List of shopping malls in Metro Manila
