= List of tallest structures in the Philippines =

The Philippines has a number of tall buildings and structures, completed, planned or under construction.

== Tallest completed buildings ==
This list ranks the highest completed skyscrapers and buildings in the Philippines as of July 2022. Buildings and skyscrapers included here stand at least 150 metres (492 ft) tall, based on standard height measurement according to Emporis and CTBUH (unless otherwise stated, the two sources agree on the height of a building). This has been shortened because there is a very high number of highrise buildings between 100 metres (328 ft) and 150 metres (492 ft) within the country. (See also the more updated List of tallest buildings in Metro Manila.)

Existing partially habitable structures are included for comparison purposes; however, they are not ranked.

Was the tallest building in the Philippines upon completion

Outside Metro Manila

Non-building structures / partially habitable structures

Rank	Building	Location	Height	Floors	Year (est.)	Image	Notes	References
1	Metrobank Center	Taguig, Metro Manila	318 m (1,043 ft)	66	2017		The tallest building in the Philippines since its completion earlier in 2017. Roof Height, CTBUH: 259.1 m (850 ft)	
—	Net 25 Tower (Communications tower)	Quezon City, Metro Manila	276.4 m (907 ft)	—	2000			
2	PBCom Tower	Makati, Metro Manila	258.6 m (848 ft)	52	2000		The tallest building in the Philippines, 2000–2017	
3	Trump Tower Manila	Makati, Metro Manila	250.7 m (823 ft)	58	2017		2nd tallest residential building in the Philippines.	
4	The Gramercy Residences	Makati, Metro Manila	250 m (820 ft)	73	2012		3rd tallest residential building in the Philippines. CTBUH: 243.9 m (800 ft)	
4	Discovery Primea	Makati, Metro Manila	250 m (820 ft)	68	2014		CTBUH: 238.8 m (783 ft)	
4	Shangri-La at the Fort, Manila	Taguig, Metro Manila	250 m (820 ft)	61	2016		CTBUH: 229.3 m (752 ft)	
5	Shang Salcedo Place	Makati, Metro Manila	249.80 m (819.6 ft)	67	2017			
6	Mega Tower	Mandaluyong, Metro Manila	249.67 m (819.1 ft)	50	2021			
7	Century Spire	Makati, Metro Manila	245 m (804 ft)	60	2022		Irregular and interesting shape	
8	The Imperium at Capital Commons	Pasig, Metro Manila	240 m (790 ft)	63	2020			
—	Tower of Power (Communications tower)	Quezon City, Metro Manila	236.8 m (777 ft)	—	1988			
—	TV5 Satellite Tower (Communications tower)	Quezon City, Metro Manila	230.0 m (754.6 ft)	—	1990			
9	Grand Riviera Suites	Manila, Metro Manila	230 m (750 ft)	57	2014			
9	The Royalton at Capitol Commons	Pasig, Metro Manila	230 m (750 ft)	65	2019			
10	One Shangri-La Place Tower North	Mandaluyong, Metro Manila	227 m (745 ft)	64	2015		CTBUH: 222.3 m (729 ft)	
10	One Shangri-La Place Tower South	Mandaluyong, Metro Manila	227 m (745 ft)	64	2015		CTBUH: 222.3 m (729 ft)	
10	The Suites at One Bonifacio High Street	Taguig, Metro Manila	227 m (745 ft)	63	2019			
11	Corporate Finance Plaza	Pasig, Metro Manila	226.3 m (742 ft)	57	2021			
12	The Skysuites Tower	Quezon City, Metro Manila	223 m (732 ft)	44	2018			
13	BSA Twin Tower 1	Mandaluyong, Metro Manila	221.2 m (726 ft)	55	2011			
13	BSA Twin Tower 2	Mandaluyong, Metro Manila	221.2 m (726 ft)	55	2011			
14	Alphaland Makati Place	Makati, Metro Manila	220 m (720 ft)	55	2017			
—	Sual Power Station Chimney (Flue-gas stack)	Sual, Pangasinan	220 m (720 ft)	—				
—	Millennium Transmitter (Communications tower)	Quezon City, Metro Manila	219.5 m (720 ft)	—	1969 - 2025			
15	GT International Tower	Makati, Metro Manila	217.2 m (713 ft)	47	2001			
16	The St. Francis Shangri-La Place Tower A	Mandaluyong, Metro Manila	212.9 m (698 ft)	60	2009			
16	The St. Francis Shangri-La Place Tower B	Mandaluyong, Metro Manila	212.9 m (698 ft)	60	2009			
17	Petron Megaplaza	Makati, Metro Manila	210 m (690 ft)	45	1998		The tallest building in the Philippines from 1998 to 2000	
17	Podium West Tower	Mandaluyong, Metro Manila	210 m (690 ft)	48	2020			
17	BDO Corporate Center	Mandaluyong, Metro Manila	210 m (690 ft)	47	2015		CTBUH: 210.5 m (691 ft)	
17	Park Terraces Point Tower	Makati, Metro Manila	210 m (690 ft)	59	2020			
17	The Rise by Shangri-la Makati	Makati, Metro Manila	210 m (690 ft)	63	2019			
18	The Knightsbridge Residences	Makati, Metro Manila	209 m (686 ft)	62	2014			
19	UnionBank Plaza	Pasig, Metro Manila	206.04 m (676.0 ft)	49	2004			
20	Edades Tower	Makati, Metro Manila	205 m (673 ft)	53	2014		CTBUH: 161.2 m (529 ft)	
21	The Residences at Greenbelt – San Lorenzo Tower	Makati, Metro Manila	204.01 m (669.3 ft)	57	2009			
22	1322 Golden Empire Tower	Manila, Metro Manila	203 m (666 ft)	57	2002			
22	One San Miguel Avenue	Pasig, Metro Manila	203 m (666 ft)	54	2001		CTBUH: 182.9 m (600 ft)	
23	One Corporate Centre	Pasig, Metro Manila	202 m (663 ft)	54	2009			
24	One Rockwell West Tower	Makati, Metro Manila	201.9 m (662 ft)	55	2010			
25	Philamlife Tower	Makati, Metro Manila	200 m (660 ft)	48	2000			
25	Three Central Tower 2	Makati, Metro Manila	200 m (660 ft)	53	2016			
—	RPN-9 Transmitter RPTV (Communications tower)	Quezon City, Metro Manila	185.0 m (607.0 ft)	—	1975			
26	Milano Residences	Metro Manila	196 m (643 ft)	53	2016			
27	Air Residences	Makati, Metro Manila	195.6 m (642 ft)	60	2019			
28	The Proscenium Residences at The Proscenium at Rockwell	Makati, Metro Manila	195.4 m (641 ft)	60	2021			
—	ZOE TV Transmitter A2Z (Communications tower)	Antipolo City, Rizal	170.5 m (559 ft)	—	2020		Reinforced tower after the termination of a blocktime agreement with GMA Network in 2019.	
29	One Central Makati	Makati, Metro Manila	195 m (640 ft)	50	2013			
30	Ayala Triangle Garden North	Makati, Metro Manila	194.6 m (638 ft)	40	2021			
31	8 Forbestown Road	Taguig, Metro Manila	194 m (636 ft)	53	2013		One of the tallest buildings in Bonifacio Global City. CTBUH: 183 m (600 ft)	
32	Admiral Baysuites	Manila, Metro Manila	193.2 m (634 ft)	52	2014			
33	RCBC Plaza Yuchengco Tower	Makati, Metro Manila	192.03 m (630.0 ft)	46	2001			
34	Anchor Skysuites	Manila, Metro Manila	190.6 m (625 ft)	56	2013		Tallest building in Binondo and all of Chinatown all over the world	
35	The Viridian in Greenhills	San Juan City, Metro Manila	190 m (620 ft)	53	2016			
36	Jollibee Tower	Pasig, Metro Manila	188 m (617 ft)	40	2019			
37	Park Terraces Tower 1	Makati, Metro Manila	187 m (614 ft)	49	2015			
37	Park Terraces Tower 2	Makati, Metro Manila	187 m (614 ft)	49	2018			
38	Rufino Pacific Tower	Makati, Metro Manila	186 m (610 ft)	41	1994		Tallest building in the Philippines from 1994 to 1997. CTBUH: 162 m (531 ft)	
38	Eastwood Global Plaza	Quezon City, Metro Manila	186 m (610 ft)	49	2019			
39	Green Residences	Manila, Metro Manila	185 m (607 ft)	52	2016			
39	GLAS Tower	Pasig, Metro Manila	185 m (607 ft)	42	2020			
39	Horizons 101 Tower 1	Cebu City, Cebu	185 m (607 ft)	55	2016		Tallest building in the Philippines outside Metro Manila. CTBUH: 178 m (584 ft)	
40	The Kirov Tower at The Proscenium at Rockwell	Makati, Metro Manila	184.5 m (605 ft)	56	2020			
41	Summit One Tower	Mandaluyong, Metro Manila	181.15 m (594.3 ft)	49	1998			
42	Tower 6789	Makati, Metro Manila	180 m (590 ft)	34	2013		CTBUH: 180 m (590 ft)	
42	LKG Tower	Makati, Metro Manila	180 m (590 ft)	38	2000			
42	The Shang Grand Tower	Makati, Metro Manila	180 m (590 ft)	46	2006			
42	Marco Polo Ortigas Manila	Pasig, Metro Manila	180 m (590 ft)	41	2014			
42	The Finance Centre	Taguig, Metro Manila	180 m (590 ft)	43	2018		CTBUH: 180.2 m (591 ft)	
43	Pacific Plaza Tower 1	Taguig, Metro Manila	179 m (587 ft)	52	2001			
43	Pacific Plaza Tower 2	Taguig, Metro Manila	179 m (587 ft)	52	2001			
43	Admiral Grandsuites	Manila, Metro Manila	179 m (587 ft)	43	2020			
43	Avant-Garde Residences	Pasig, Metro Manila	179 m (587 ft)	45	2012			
44	Atlanta Centre	San Juan, Metro Manila	178.5 m (586 ft)	37	1998			
45	Birch Tower	Manila, Metro Manila	178 m (584 ft)	52	2012			
45	Aspire Tower at Nuvo City	Quezon City, Metro Manila	178 m (584 ft)	48	2012			
46	The Sakura at The Proscenium at Rockwell	Makati, Metro Manila	176.5 m (579 ft)	51	2018			
47	Uptown Parksuites Tower 1	Taguig, Metro Manila	175.5 m (576 ft)	48	2019			
48	Robinsons Equitable Tower	Pasig, Metro Manila	175 m (574 ft)	45	1997		Tallest building in the Philippines from 1997 to 1998	
49	One Roxas Triangle	Makati, Metro Manila	174.25 m (571.7 ft)	51	2000			
49	Two Roxas Triangle	Makati, Metro Manila	174.25 m (571.7 ft)	51	2019			
49	R Square Residences	Manila, Metro Manila	174.25 m (571.7 ft)	52	2019			
50	Robinsons Summit Center	Makati, Metro Manila	174 m (571 ft)	38	2001			
50	Paragon Plaza	Mandaluyong, Metro Manila	174 m (571 ft)	43	1998			
51	Twin Oaks Place East Tower	Mandaluyong, Metro Manila	173 m (568 ft)	51	2018			
51	Twin Oaks Place West Tower	Mandaluyong, Metro Manila	173 m (568 ft)	51	2014		CTBUH: 171.6 m (563 ft)	
52	The Enterprise Center Tower One	Makati, Metro Manila	172 m (564 ft)	45	1999			
53	The Residences at Greenbelt‑Manila Tower	Makati, Metro Manila	171 m (561 ft)	48	2010			
53	The Residences at Greenbelt‑Laguna Tower	Makati, Metro Manila	171 m (561 ft)	48	2008			
54	RCBC Plaza Tower 2	Makati, Metro Manila	170 m (560 ft)	41	2001			
54	The Beacon – Arnaiz Tower	Makati, Metro Manila	170 m (560 ft)	50	2013		CTBUH: 197 m (646 ft)	
54	Noble Place	Manila, Metro Manila	170 m (560 ft)	47	2018			
54	Trion Towers 1	Taguig, Metro Manila	170 m (560 ft)	49	2012			
54	Trion Towers 2	Taguig, Metro Manila	170 m (560 ft)	49	2015			
54	Trion Towers 3	Taguig, Metro Manila	170 m (560 ft)	49	2019			
54	Uptown Ritz Residence	Taguig, Metro Manila	170 m (560 ft)	45	2018			
—	SM Sky Tower (Observation tower)	Cebu City, Cebu	170 m (560 ft)	—	2015		Tallest observation tower in the Philippines.	
55	Pearl of the Orient Tower	Manila, Metro Manila	168 m (551 ft)	42	2004			
55	Crown Regency Cebu – Fuente Tower 1	Cebu City, Cebu	168 m (551 ft)	45	2005		Tallest building in the Philippines outside Metro Manila from 2005 to 2015; CTBUH: 157 m (515 ft)	
56	Discovery Suites Manila	Pasig, Metro Manila	167 m (548 ft)	40	1999		Tallest hotel building in the Philippines	
56	RCBC Savings Bank Corporate Center	Taguig, Metro Manila	167 m (548 ft)	37	2013			
56	Horizons 101 Tower 2	Cebu City, Cebu	167 m (548 ft)	46	2019		CTBUH: 157 m (515 ft)	
57	Exquadra (Unioil) Tower	Pasig, Metro Manila	166.6 m (547 ft)	38	2020			
58	GA Twin Tower I	Mandaluyong, Metro Manila	165.3 m (542 ft)	40	2005			
58	GA Twin Tower II	Mandaluyong, Metro Manila	165.3 m (542 ft)	40	2008			
59	One Rockwell East Tower	Makati, Metro Manila	165.2 m (542 ft)	45	2011			
60	Flair Towers – North Tower	Mandaluyong, Metro Manila	165 m (541 ft)	52	2015			
60	Flair Towers – South Tower	Mandaluyong, Metro Manila	165 m (541 ft)	52	2014			
60	Torre de Manila	Manila, Metro Manila	165 m (541 ft)	47	2019		Most controversial project in Manila.	
61	Cebu Exchange	Cebu City, Cebu	164 m (538 ft)	39	2021		The largest office building in the Philippines by gross floor area.	
62	One Uptown Residence	Taguig, Metro Manila	163 m (535 ft)	45	2018		CTBUH: 147 m (482 ft)	
63	Seven/NEO	Taguig, Metro Manila	162 m (531 ft)	38	2016			
64	Rizal Tower	Makati, Metro Manila	161 m (528 ft)	47	2000		CTBUH: 156 m (512 ft)	
65	The Lincoln Tower at The Proscenium at Rockwell	Makati, Metro Manila	160.5 m (527 ft)	47	2013			
66	Ayala Tower One	Makati, Metro Manila	160 m (520 ft)	35	1996		First building in the Philippines to be known as a "skyscraper"	
66	Orient Square	Pasig, Metro Manila	160 m (520 ft)	38	1999			
66	Uptown Parksuites Tower 2	Taguig, Metro Manila	160 m (520 ft)	48	2019			
66	Victoria Sports Tower A	Quezon City, Metro Manila	160 m (520 ft)	46	2019			
66	Victoria Sports Tower B	Quezon City, Metro Manila	160 m (520 ft)	46	2019			
66	Soho Central	Mandaluyong, Metro Manila	160 m (520 ft)	41	2008			
66	ADB Avenue Tower	Pasig, Metro Manila	160 m (520 ft)	40	2014			
67	Lancaster Suites One	Mandaluyong, Metro Manila	158 m (518 ft)	42	2007			
67	The Beacon – Amorsolo Tower	Makati, Metro Manila	158 m (518 ft)	44	2016			
67	The Beacon – Roces Tower	Makati, Metro Manila	158 m (518 ft)	44	2011			
68	Kroma Tower	Makati, Metro Manila	157 m (515 ft)	52	2018			
69	I’M Hotel	Makati, Metro Manila	156 m (512 ft)	45	2017			
69	Bellagio Towers C	Taguig, Metro Manila	156 m (512 ft)	40	2010			
70	Exportbank Plaza	Makati, Metro Manila	155 m (509 ft)	36	1998			
70	Zuellig Building	Makati, Metro Manila	155 m (509 ft)	42	2012			
70	The Lorraine Tower at The Proscenium at Rockwell	Makati, Metro Manila	156 m (512 ft)	56	2020			
71	BSA Tower Makati	Makati, Metro Manila	153.9 m (505 ft)	37	1998			
72	The World Centre	Makati, Metro Manila	152.4 m (500 ft)	30	1995			
73	Dream Tower at Nuvo City	Quezon City, Metro Manila	152.3 m (500 ft)	48	2019			
74	Salcedo Park Twin Towers	Makati, Metro Manila	151 m (495 ft)	41	1996			
75	Wharton Parksuites	Manila, Metro Manila	150.75 m (494.6 ft)	39	2012			
76	Pacific Plaza Condominium	Makati, Metro Manila	150 m (490 ft)	44	1992		Tallest building in the Philippines from 1992 to 1994.	
77	PTV Transmitter Station (Communications tower)	Quezon City, Metro Manila	150 m (490 ft)	—	1998			
77	One Legazpi Park	Makati, Metro Manila	150 m (490 ft)	45	2006			
77	Joy‑Nostalg Center	Pasig, Metro Manila	150 m (490 ft)	40	2009			
77	Forbes Tower West (Fraser Place)	Makati, Metro Manila	150 m (490 ft)	42	2000			
77	27 Annapolis	San Juan, Metro Manila	150 m (490 ft)	45	2020			
77	Four Seasons	Makati, Metro Manila	150 m (490 ft)	37	2005			
77	University Tower P. Noval	Manila, Metro Manila	150 m (490 ft)	47	2016			
77	East Tower at One Serendra	Taguig, Metro Manila	150 m (490 ft)	41	2012			
77	The Meranti	Taguig, Metro Manila	150 m (490 ft)	45	2013			
77	Century Diamond Tower	Makati, Metro Manila	150 m (490 ft)	41	2019			

Not included in the list are buildings which have heights that are only estimated based on floor counts. There are over 70 completed buildings falling under this category, some of which include One Eastwood Avenue Towers 1 and 2 (≈160 m and ≈188 m), West Tower at One Serendra (≈170–191 m), The BeauFort East and West Towers (≈161 m and ≈164 m), Acqua Private Residences Iguazu (≈207 m), Livingstone (≈196 m), Dettifoss (≈170 m), Sutherland (≈163 m), and Niagara (≈155 m) Towers, and The Infinity Fort Bonifacio (≈183–187 m).

Buildings which almost qualify are One McKinley Place (149 m) in Bonifacio Global City and Mandarin Square (149 m) in Binondo

The Beaufort East

The Infinity Fort Bonifacio

== Tallest unbuilt structures ==
The list includes proposed/planned buildings and structures projected to be at least 250 meters in height.

Structure	Year first proposed	Construction type	City	Pinnacle height	Floor count	Status
Princesa Tower	2018	Observation tower	Puerto Princesa	680 m (2,230 ft)	~128	Proposed
Pagcor Tower	2000s	Observation tower	Parañaque	655 m (2,149 ft)	—	Never built
Philippine Diamond Tower	2014	Observation/communications tower	Quezon City	612 m (2,008 ft)	—	Never built
Centennial Tower	1995	Observation tower	Manila or Pasig	390 m (1,280 ft)	~100	Never built
Sapphire Tower	2012	Skyscraper	Pasig	304.8 m (1,000 ft)	67–70	Planned
Feilong Dijing	2021–2022	Residential skyscraper	Manila	268.8 m (881.9 ft)	73	Proposed
El Pueblo	2012	Skyscraper	Pasig	263.2 m (863.6 ft)	63	Planned
The Block – Hyundai National Headquarters	2014–2015	Skyscraper	Taguig	250 m (820 ft)	56	Proposed

== List by geographical division ==
The following table shows the tallest buildings by the three main geographical divisions of the country: Luzon, Visayas and Mindanao.

Building	Height	Floors	Year (est.)	Location	Region
Metrobank Center	318 m (1,043 ft)	66	2016	Taguig	Luzon
Horizons 101 Tower 1	185 m (607 ft)	55	2016	Cebu City	Visayas
Vivaldi Residences Davao	121 m (397 ft)	36	2018	Davao City	Mindanao

== Cities with the most high-rises and skyscrapers ==
Philippine cities with the most number of buildings as of May 2023.

City	Highrises	100m+ Building	Total	Region
Makati	294	138	432	Metro Manila
Cebu City	242	100	342	Central Visayas
Taguig City	200	89	289	Metro Manila
Pasig City	146	71	217	Metro Manila
Manila	139	71	210	Metro Manila
Quezon City	176	30	206	Metro Manila
Mandaluyong	109	65	174	Metro Manila
Pasay	160	8	168	Metro Manila
Parañaque	123	21	144	Metro Manila
Muntinlupa	101	3	104	Metro Manila
Davao City	71	10	81	Davao
Lapu-Lapu	60	0	60	Central Visayas
Mandaue	50	5	55	Central Visayas
Iloilo City	34	1	35	Western Visayas
Las Piñas	24	2	26	Metro Manila
Mabalacat	26	0	26	Central Luzon
Angeles City	15	0	15	Central Luzon
Cagayan de Oro	16	2	18	Northern Mindanao
Bacolod	17	0	17	Negros Island Region
Cainta	16	0	16	Calabarzon
Marikina	13	0	13	Metro Manila
San Fernando	8	2	10	Central Luzon
Caloocan	6	3	9	Metro Manila
Dasmariñas	5	0	5	Calabarzon
Valenzuela	4	1	5	Metro Manila
	Source: Emporis.com			

== Timeline of tallest buildings ==
This lists buildings that have at some point held the title of tallest building in the Philippines. Other buildings, such as churches with tall spires, may historically have been taller but are not listed here because of a lack of available data for such buildings.

Name	Location	Years as tallest	Height	Floors	Image	Notes
San Sebastian Church	Manila, Metro Manila	1891–1912	30 m (98 ft)	5		Height of the two bell towers.
Manila Hotel	Manila, Metro Manila	1912–1927		6		A modernist high-rise building was added later in the 1970s.
University of Santo Tomas Main Building	Manila, Metro Manila	1927–1967	48 m (157 ft)	8		Four floors of the main building, another four on the tower.
Ramon Magsaysay Center	Manila, Metro Manila	1967–1968	70 m (230 ft)	18		
Manila Pavilion Hotel	Manila, Metro Manila	1968–1989	90 m (300 ft)	22		
Pacific Star Building	Makati, Metro Manila	1989–1991	112.5 m (369 ft)	29		
The Peak Tower	Makati, Metro Manila	1991–1992	138 m (453 ft)	38		
Pacific Plaza Condominium	Makati, Metro Manila	1992–1994	150 m (490 ft)	44		
Rufino Pacific Tower	Makati, Metro Manila	1994–1997	162 m (531 ft)	41		
Robinsons Equitable Tower	Pasig, Metro Manila	1997–1998	175 m (574 ft)	45		
Petron Megaplaza	Makati, Metro Manila	1998–2000	210 m (690 ft)	45		
PBCom Tower	Makati, Metro Manila	2000–2017	259 m (850 ft)	52		
Metrobank Center	Taguig, Metro Manila	2017–present	318 m (1,043 ft)	66		

== See also ==
- List of tallest buildings in the world
- List of tallest twin buildings and structures in the world
- List of tallest buildings in Metro Manila
- List of tallest buildings in Metro Cebu
- List of tallest buildings in Iloilo
- List of tallest buildings in Cagayan de Oro
- List of tallest buildings in Davao City
