= Luna Gardens =

- Interactive map of the Luna Gardens area

General information
- Status: Completed
- Type: Residential
- Location: 21 Residential Drive, Rockwell Center, Makati, Philippines
- Coordinates: 14.5651°N 121.0351°E
- Named for: Juan Luna
- Completed: 1999
- Owner: Rockwell Land Corporation

Height
- Height: 148.80 m (488.19 ft)

Technical details
- Floor count: 39

Design and construction
- Architects: Palafox Associates; Skidmore, Owings & Merrill LLP
- Developer: Rockwell Land Corporation
- Structural engineer: Aromin & Sy + Associates, Inc. Skidmore, Owings & Merrill LLP

Luna Gardens is a 39-storey residential skyscraper in Rockwell Center, in Makati, Philippines. The building was completed in 1999. It has a height of 148.80 m (488.19 ft). It is named after Filipino painter Juan Luna.

== See also ==
- List of tallest buildings in the Philippines
