= Felino Palafox =

Filipino architect, urban planner (born 1950)

Felino A. Palafox, Jr.
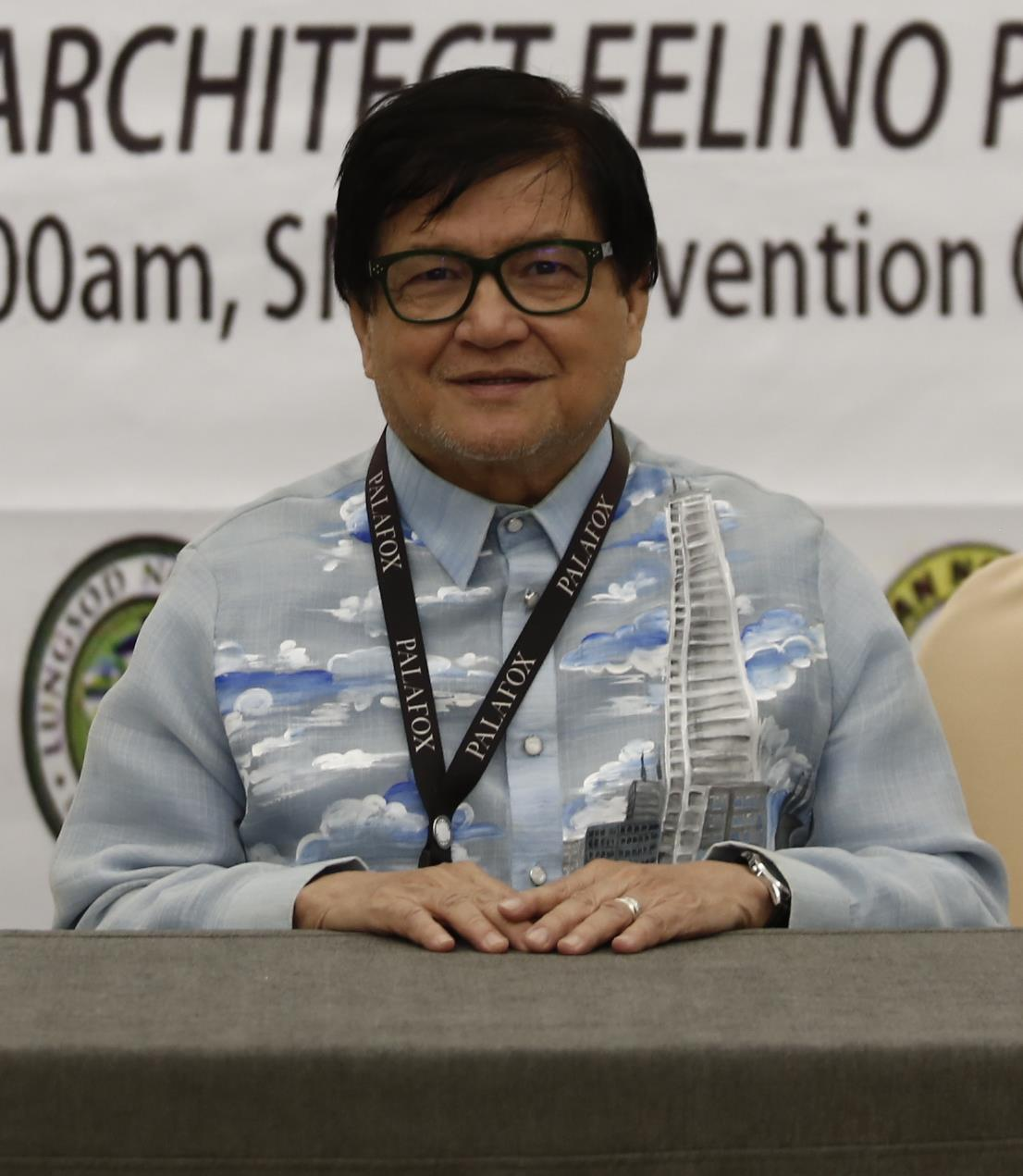
- Palafox in 2017
- Born: March 16, 1950 (age 76); Bacarra, Ilocos Norte, Philippines
- Education: University of Santo Tomas; University of the Philippines Diliman
- Occupation: Architect
- Awards: People of the Year (People Asia Magazine), 2009; The Outstanding Thomasian Alumni (TOTAL) Awardee in Architecture by UST, 2009
- Buildings: Rockwell Center; Rizal Tower; Hidalgo Place; Luna Gardens
- Projects: La Mesa Ecopark

Felino "Jun" Albano Palafox, Jr. is a Filipino architect and urban planner. He is the Principal Architect-Urban Planner and Founder of Palafox Associates.

Palafox also serves as a member of the board of directors in Asian Terminals, Inc. from 2009 to present, chaired professional and civic organisations such as PIEP, MAP and Rotary Club of Manila.

== Education ==
Palafox received a classical secondary education from Christ the King seminary when he was 13. He obtained his bachelor's degree in Architecture from University of Santo Tomas in 1972 and two years later, in 1974, he obtained his master's degree in Environmental Planning at the UP Diliman through a scholarship grant by United Nations Development Program (UNDP).

In 2003, he graduated in Advanced Management Development Program for Real Estate at the Harvard University.

== Career ==
In 1977 he started working as Senior Architect and Planner for the government of Dubai. During also that time, he met Henry Sy who later became one of his clients. Sy encouraged him to return to the country. Palafox worked for the Dubai municipality until 1981.

== Awards ==
1. Palafox Associates is the first Filipino architectural firm cited in the World's Top 500 Architectural Firms of the World Architecture Magazine. In 2006, the firm ranked 94th – holding the distinction of being the only Southeast Asian firm in the list. In 2012, Palafox Associates places 89th in the world-ranking dominated by American, European, Japanese, Australian and Chinese firms; and Top 8 in the Leisure Market sector
