= BDO Life Megaplaza =

Skyscraper in Makati, Philippines

- BDO Life Megaplaza (formerly Petron Megaplaza) as seen from Buendia Avenue, Makati.

Record height
- Tallest in the Philippines from 1998 to 2000^{[I]}
- Preceded by: Robinsons Equitable Tower
- Surpassed by: PBCom Tower

General information
- Status: Completed
- Type: Office
- Location: 358 Gil Puyat Avenue, Makati, Philippines
- Coordinates: 14°33′41.74″N 121°1′33.25″E
- Completed: 1998
- Opening: 1998
- Owner: Megaworld Corporation

Height
- Antenna spire: 210 m (689.0 ft)

Technical details
- Floor count: 45 aboveground, 5 belowground
- Lifts/elevators: 18

Design and construction
- Architect: Skidmore, Owings & Merrill
- Developer: Megaworld Corporation
- Structural engineer: Aromin & Sy + Associates; Ove Arup & Partners
- Main contractor: D.M. Consunji

The BDO Life Megaplaza, formerly the Petron Megaplaza is an office skyscraper located in Makati, Philippines. It previously held the title as the tallest building in the Philippines from 1998 to 2000 when the PBCom Tower was topped-off. It has a total ground to architectural spire top height of 210 meters, soaring at 45 storeys high. Petron Corporation was the building's main tenant from 1998 to 2010.

BDO Life Assurance Company Inc. is the current main tenant of the building since 2022.

== Architecture and design ==
The developer and owner of BDO Life Megaplaza is Megaworld Corporation, one of the largest real estate companies in the Philippines. The word "Mega" in Megaplaza is in recognition of Megaworld Corporation's participation and ownership of the building.

The building was designed by world-renowned architectural firm Skidmore, Owings & Merrill, LLP, while the structural design works was made by well known Philippine engineering firm Aromin + Sy & Associates, in cooperation with another internationally known engineering company Ove Arup & Partners (presently known as Arup). Construction works was undertaken by D.M. Consunji, Inc., one of the largest general contractors in the country.

== Location ==
The BDO Life Megaplaza is located at Gil Puyat Avenue (also known as Buendia Avenue) near the intersection with Makati Avenue, well within the Makati Central Business District. It is strategically positioned near other major establishments, including the Mandarin Oriental Manila, Citadel Inn and Makati Palace hotel, numerous office and residential buildings, and entertainment areas along Makati Avenue and Burgos Street.

== See also ==
- List of tallest buildings in the Philippines

Records
Preceded by Robinsons Equitable Tower	Tallest building in the Philippines; 1998–2000; 210 m	Succeeded by PBCom Tower
