= Horizons 101 =

Condominium complex in Cebu City, Philippines

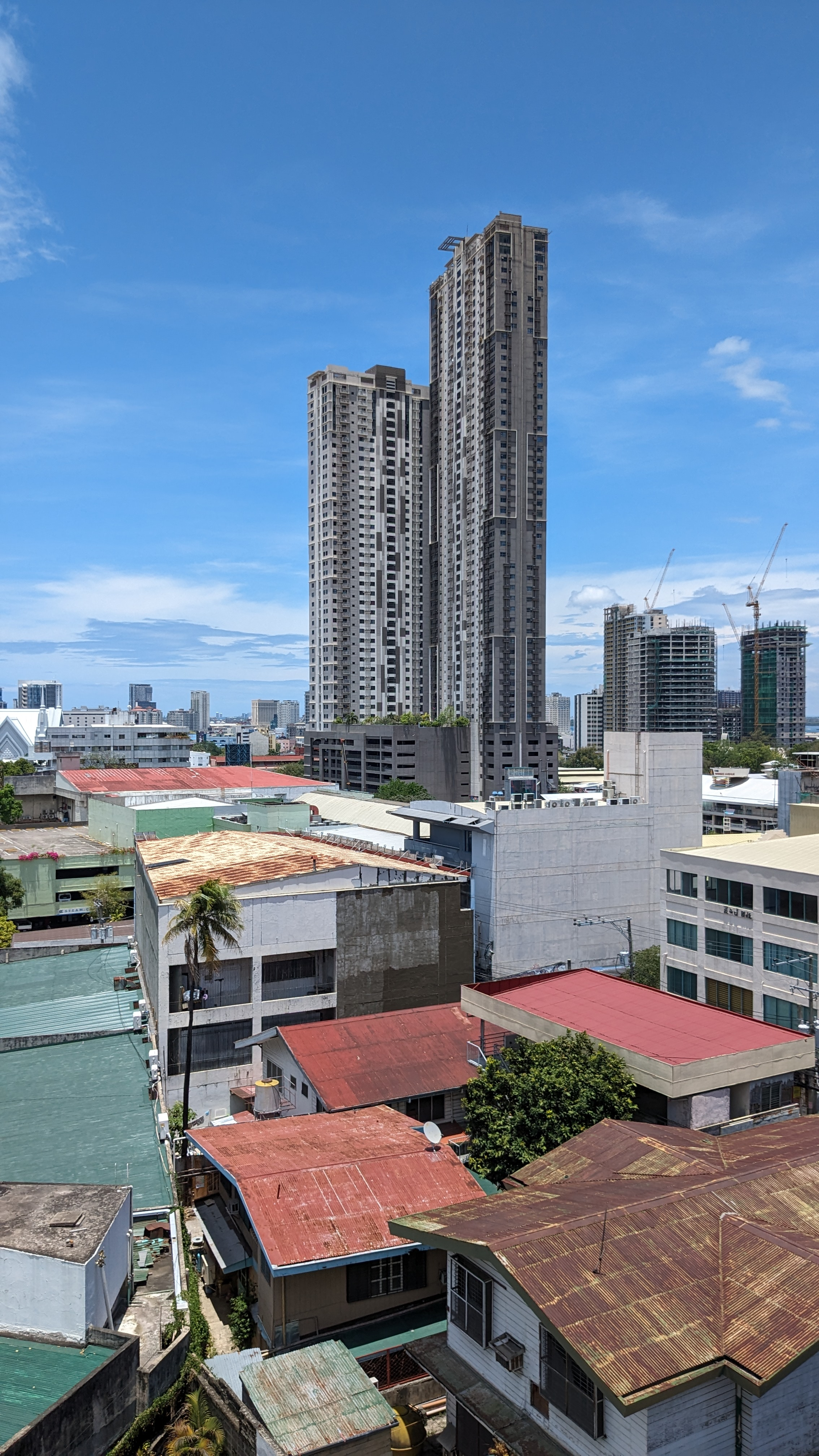
- Horizons 101 in 2023
- Interactive map of the Horizons 101 area

General information
- Status: Completed
- Type: Residential
- Coordinates: 10°18′38″N 123°53′51″E
- Construction started: 2012
- Completed: 2017 (Tower 1); 2019 (Tower 2)

Height
- Height: 185 meters (607 ft) (Tower 1); 167 meters (548 ft) (Tower 2)

Technical details
- Floor count: 55 (Tower 1); 46 (Tower 2)

Design and construction
- Developer: Taft Properties
- Main contractor: DDT Konstract, Inc.

Other information
- Public transit access: 03B Mabolo; 04C Lahug; 04I Plaza Housing, Busay; 06H Guadalupe; 12L Labangon; 17C Apas

The Horizons 101 is a condominium complex in Cebu City. Tower 1 of the two-tower complex was completed in late 2015. At 185 meters tall with 55 floors, it is presently the country's tallest building outside of Metro Manila and is the tallest building in Cebu City. Tower 2 at 168 meters tall with 46 floors is Cebu City's 2nd tallest building and was finished in early 2019.

The name Horizon 101 comes from the two towers' total number of floors of 55 + 46 = 101.

== Construction ==
Plans to construct Horizons 101 was reported as early as May 2011. Taft Property Venture Development Corp. of the Gaisanos announced its first condominium project. At that time, the construction of Tower 1 was already green-lit with the construction of Tower 2 still pending. The firm was still awaiting the sales performance of Tower 1 before pushing through with the construction of the second tower. Excavation works were commenced in January 2012. DDT Konstract was tasked as the project's general contractor.

In April 2012, a retention wall at the site's perimeter collapsed which affected ten nearby houses. This led to the issuance of a cease and desist order which was later lifted by early July 2012.

About 3.6 billion pesos was spent for Horizons 101 by December 2015. In the same period, construction for Tower 2 had already began with scheduled turnover of units in mid-2017. Plans for a third tower, a BPO component was also announced.
