= Edades Tower =

- Interactive map of the Edades Tower area
- Alternative names: Edades Tower and Garden Villas

General information
- Status: Completed
- Type: Residential
- Location: Amorsolo Drive, Rockwell Center, Makati, Metro Manila, Philippines
- Coordinates: 14.5662°N 121.0358°E
- Named for: Victorio Edades
- Construction started: 2010
- Completed: 2014
- Owner: Rockwell Land Corporation

Height
- Height: 205 m (672.57 ft)

Technical details
- Floor count: 53

Design and construction
- Architects: Pimentel Rodriguez Simbulan & Partners
- Developer: Rockwell Land Corporation

Edades Tower, also known as Edades Tower and Garden Villas, is a 53-storey residential skyscraper in Rockwell Center, in Makati, Metro Manila, Philippines. The building was constructed in 2010 and was completed in 2014. As of 2022, it is the 20th-tallest building in the Philippines. It is named after Filipino painter Victorio Edades. It also has access to the nearby Power Plant Mall via an underground tunnel.

== See also ==
- List of tallest buildings in the Philippines
