= Rockwell Land =

Real estate developer in the Philippines

Rockwell Land Corporation
- Type: Private
- Industry: Real estate
- Founded: 1995; 31 years ago
- Headquarters: 8 Rockwell Tower, Rockwell Center, Makati, Metro Manila, Philippines
- Key people: Nestor Padilla (Chairman and CEO); Federico Lopez (Vice Chairman)
- Owner: Lopez Holdings Corporation
- Parent: First Philippine Holdings
- Website: www.e-rockwell.com

Rockwell Land Corporation (RLC), better known as Rockwell Land, is a property developer in the Philippines engaged in the high-end real estate and retail industries. Founded in 1995 and part of the Lopez Group, its primary focus is on developing establishing sites under the Rockwell ownership, including the Rockwell Center in Makati.

== History ==
Rockwell Land was founded in 1995 by the Lopez Group with the mission to transition the former 15.5-hectare (38-acre) thermal power plant lot previously belonged to Manila Electric Railroad and Light Company into a high-end residential and commercial site.

Following its success of Rockwell Center, the company expands its real estate business into multi-tower projects like The Grove by Rockwell in Pasig, The Arton in Quezon City, and business centers including the Rockwell Sheridan Business Center in Mandaluyong.

On December 22, 2025, Rockwell Land announced that they acquired a 74.8 percent stake on Alabang Commercial Corporation (ACC), the owner of Alabang Town Center, for ₱21.6 billion (US$438.58 million). The company later raised its stake to 99.26% after a ₱6.2 billion (US$125.89 million) deal in July 2026.

== Properties ==
=== Sites ===
- Rockwell Center - a 15.5-hectare flagship mixed-use estate located in Makati featuring the West Block (Rizal Tower, Hidalgo Place, Luna Gardens, Amorsolo Square), East Block (One Rockwell, Edades), Power Plant Mall, and 8 Rockwell.
- Alabang Town Center - a 17.5-hectare retail mall and office complex in Muntinlupa. Acquired a stake by Rockwell Land from the Madrigal family thru Alabang Commercial Corporation in 2025.
