= Rufino Pacific Tower =

- The all-glass exterior of Rufino Pacific Tower.
- Interactive map of the Rufino Pacific Tower area

Record height
- Tallest in the Philippines from 1994 to 1997^{[I]}
- Preceded by: Pacific Plaza Condominium
- Surpassed by: Robinsons Equitable Tower

General information
- Status: Completed
- Type: Office
- Location: 6784 Ayala Avenue cor. V.A. Rufino Street, Legaspi Village, Makati, Philippines
- Coordinates: 14°33′28.86″N 121°1′5.83″E
- Opening: 1994
- Owner: Rufino family

Height
- Antenna spire: 200 m (656.17 ft)
- Roof: 161 m (528.22 ft)

Technical details
- Floor count: 41

Design and construction
- Main contractor: BF Corporation

Rufino Pacific Tower or more commonly known as Rufino Tower or Rufino Plaza is an office skyscraper and is one of the tallest buildings in the Philippines and tallest buildings in Metro Manila. It remains as the tallest steel-framed building in the country. It has a ground to architectural top height of 161 metres (528 ft), one of three ways of determining building heights according to Council on Tall Buildings and Urban Habitat. Counting its eight-storey radio tower, the building has a total height of 200 metres (660 ft). It has a total of 41 stories above ground level, including a 10 storey podium which is actually the original building, the old V.A. Rufino Building, and was modified to be the podium of the new tower. It is one of the few skyscrapers that uses car elevators.

Rufino Tower is designed with exterior double-glazed, unitized curtain walls. Its interiors are constructed from glass, natural stone and metal. The building is the home of the Rufino family corporations, including major financial and insurance corporations. The Czech Embassy is also housed in the tower.

== Location ==
The building is located at 6784 Ayala Avenue corner V.A. Rufino Street (which was also named in honor of the Rufino family) in Makati. The stretch of Ayala Avenue, aptly nicknamed the Wall Street of the Philippines, where Rufino Pacific Tower lies also has branches of Metrobank, Bank of the Philippine Islands, Equitable PCI Bank (now BDO), Export and Industry Bank, International Exchange Bank (now UnionBank), and East West Bank. The Tower hosts the city's first "green & boutique" business centre, Little Green Hub, for incubating start-up and early-stage companies in Makati. It also almost directly faces PBCom Tower, the tallest building in the Philippines then. The building has a signature all-glass design, similar to Pacific Plaza Towers, one of the tallest buildings in Bonifacio Global City, which was also developed by the Rufino family.

Records
Preceded by Pacific Plaza Condominium	Tallest building in the Philippines; 1994–1997; 162 m	Succeeded by Robinsons Equitable Tower
