= Centennial Tower (Philippines) =

Proposed observation tower in Manila

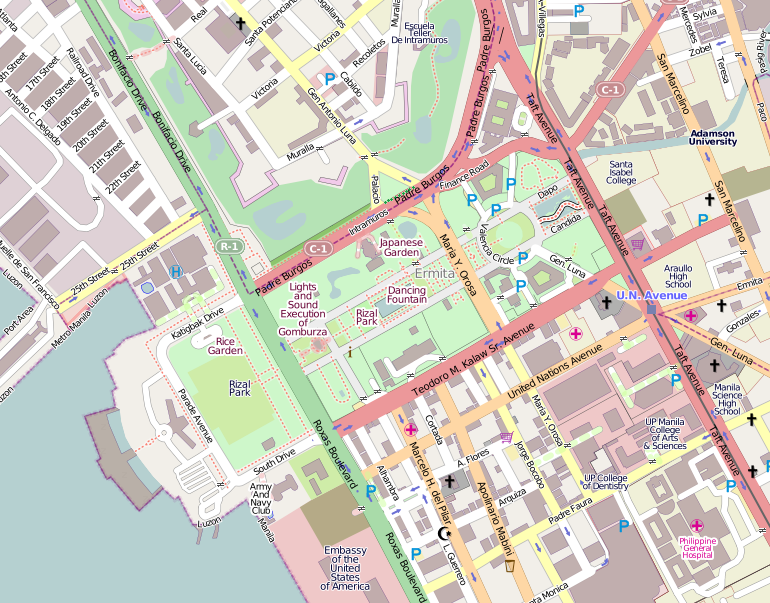
- Location in Rizal Park Location in Manila Location in Metro Manila Location in Luzon Location in the Philippines

General information
- Status: Never built
- Location: Agrifina Circle, Rizal Park, Ermita (original site); Julia Vargas Avenue cor. Meralco Avenue (final site), Manila (original site); Pasig (final site), Philippines
- Coordinates: 14.584248°N 120.9814171°E (original site)
- Cost: $200 million

Height
- Antenna spire: 390 m (1,279.5 ft)

Design and construction
- Architect: Francisco Mañosa
- Developer: Walter Bau-AG

The Centennial Tower, also known as Luneta Tower, was a proposed mixed-use observation tower initially proposed to be located in Rizal Park, Manila, Philippines. It was later proposed to be built in Pasig amidst backlash over the original planned site. It was planned to be a memorial to the 100th anniversary of Philippine independence.

== Architecture and design ==
The Centennial Tower was designed by Filipino architect Francisco Mañosa. It was planned to have a height of 390 metres (1,280 ft) or equivalent to a 100-storey building. The proposed height was about two times higher than the Rufino Tower, the tallest building in Metro Manila as of 1996.

The structure designed by Mañosa was inspired by the sulo, or bamboo torch, to highlight the country's Asian heritage and character. The diameter of the tower's base was to measure 60 meters (200 ft). A 250 m^{2} (2,700 sq ft) restaurant was to be hosted at the tower at two-thirds up from its base. Government agencies and private firms were to occupy the tower for office use, with at least 18 firms having expressed an interest in using the upper portion of the tower for telecommunications use. The building's design would later serve as the inspiration for the 2019 Southeast Asian Games cauldron.

== Planned construction ==
According to a 1996 report, the tower was to be constructed and financed by German firm Walter Bau-AG and was to cost around $200 million, or around ₱5.2 billion. If the tower was constructed, the German firm would operate the tower for 23 years, after which it would transfer ownership and operations to the Philippine government. The Department of Transportation and Communications was the lead government agency for the construction project. In July 1996, Walter Bau-AG expressed that it was capable of finishing the construction of the building by 1998 but such plans were jeopardized due to the indecision of the administration of President Fidel V. Ramos to green light the construction of the tower.

Earlier in March 1995, the firm that would construct the building was reported to be Malaysia-based Internal Finance and Marketing Corp. at a cost of ₱240 million.

== Proposed location ==
The Centennial Tower was to be constructed in lieu of the skating rink at the center of the Agrifina Circle at Rizal Park owing to its historical value, accessibility and aesthetic importance. The site was chosen over other six proposed sites – Corregidor, Fort Bonifacio, Clark Freeport Zone, Cavite, Subic Bay Freeport Zone and Greenhills. The first site was found to be too inaccessible to the public; Fort Bonifacio and Cavite were within the air corridor of landing planes; Clark and Subic were surrounded by lahar lands, which the proponents of the project found unappealing for potential visitors of the tower; and Greenhills was found to be overcrowded. Rizal Park was chosen owing to its accessibility to tourists and the general public, the popular sunset at Manila Bay and the site's historical connections such as the execution of Jose Rizal which led to the Philippine Revolution.

In April 1996, the National Centennial Commission decided to move the site of the tower to a lot owned by the Metropolitan Manila Development Authority at the corner of Julia Vargas and Meralco Avenues in Pasig from the original controversial site at the Agrifina Circle. However, the construction of the project never began.

== Reception ==
The chosen site was a subject of criticism, with critics saying the tower might "desecrate" the site. Senators Blas Ople and Ernesto Maceda suggested that the tower be built at the Quezon Memorial Circle or Fort Bonifacio instead of Rizal Park, where the Rizal Monument might be dwarfed by the structure. Senator Gloria Macapagal Arroyo called for the scrapping of the project altogether, saying that while she supported efforts to improve telecommunications in the country, she found the project as a "capricious" undertaking amidst the country's more urgent needs.

Responding to criticisms, Mañosa stated that the tower would occupy the fourth quadrant facing Taft Avenue and would be far enough from the Rizal Monument's quadrant. The architect remarked that the tower was "tall but not wide". He insisted that the tower would boost the historic significance of Rizal Park and encourage more tourists to visit the park. It was reported that the tower was to be constructed on an unstable base, but Walter Bau-AG said it conducted soil analysis and guaranteed that the soil was stable and added that it had enough experience, resources and technology for the tower's construction.

== See also ==
- Pagcor Tower
- Philippine Diamond Tower
- Torre de Manila
