= One Rockwell East Tower =

Condominium in Makati, Philippines

One Rockwell Towers
- Interactive map of the One Rockwell Towers area

General information
- Status: Completed
- Type: Residence
- Location: Makati, Philippines
- Coordinates: 14.56342°N 121.03839°E
- Construction started: 2007
- Completed: 2011
- Opening: 2011

Height
- Roof: 165 m (541 ft)

Technical details
- Floor count: 45

Design and construction
- Architect: Arquitectonica
- Developer: Rockwell Land Corporation (part of Lopez Group)

One Rockwell East Tower is a condominium in Rockwell Center, Makati, Philippines. The building is part of the One Rockwell complex. It is the smallest in the complex and it stands 165 m (541 ft) tall.

== Design ==
The West Tower is notable for being the tallest in the complex, but the East Tower is notable for its Z-shaped condo units. The building also appears as if it is three separate buildings. The tower's design was inspired by the shape of the Banaue Rice Terraces. It has a double-height floor-to-ceiling glass panel on one end to make the views more expansive.
