= Robinsons Equitable Tower =

Tallest building in the Philippines from 1997 to 1998

- Interactive map of the Robinsons Equitable Tower area
- Former names: Robinsons PCI Bank Tower (1997–1999)

Record height
- Tallest in the Philippines from 1997 to 1998^{[I]}
- Preceded by: Rufino Pacific Tower
- Surpassed by: Petron Megaplaza

General information
- Status: Completed
- Type: Office
- Location: ADB Avenue corner Guadix Drive and Poveda Street, Ortigas Center, Pasig, Philippines
- Coordinates: 14°35′21.82″N 121°3′35.74″E
- Construction started: 1995
- Completed: 1997
- Opening: 1997
- Owner: Robinsons Land Corporation

Height
- Roof: 175 m (574.15 ft)

Technical details
- Floor count: 45 aboveground, 4 belowground
- Lifts/elevators: 13

Design and construction
- Architects: Hellmuth, Obata + Kassabaum; W.V. Coscoluella & Associates
- Developer: Robinsons Land Corporation
- Structural engineer: R.S. Caparros Associates & Company
- Main contractor: D.M. Consunji

The Robinsons Equitable Tower, formerly known as the Robinsons PCI Bank Tower, is an office skyscraper located in Pasig, Philippines. It was completed in 1997 and stands at 175 metres (574 feet).

== The Project Team ==
The Robinsons Equitable Tower is owned and developed by Robinsons Land Corporation, the real estate arm of JG Summit Holdings. Originally intended to be a 40-storey condominium project between Robinsons Land Corp. and the former PCI Bank (which later on became Equitable PCI Bank after the merger of Equitable Bank and PCI Bank, hence the name change) and will follow the original model of the Robinsons Galleria complex. It was then changed to a taller office building which is different in design as originally planned.

The building was masterplanned by the renowned architectural firm Hellmuth, Obata + Kassabaum (HOK), and was designed by Philippine architectural firm W.V. Coscolluela & Associates. R.S. Caparros Associates & Company, an established undertook the structural design consulting for the building.

Construction Management services were provided by D.A. Abcede & Associates, an established construction management company in the Philippines, the Project Management services were provided by Veldon Corporation Phils. Inc. led by its Project Manager Anthony Gulliver and his Assistant Project Manager Nelson G. Evangelista, MSCE, MBA, MSML, an established project management company, while the general contractor for the project is D.M. Consunji, Inc., one of the largest construction companies in the country.

== Design ==
The building's exterior made use of green-shaded aluminum high-performance glass curtain walls and punched windows, with a sleek semi-circular and almost cylindrical portion rising from the corner of ADB Avenue and Poveda Drive. The building also has a rooftop master antenna provided for the entire building's communication system needs, and has a distinctive rooftop crown serving as an architectural highlight to the entire building.

== Location ==
Strategically situated along ADB Avenue as part of the Robinsons Galleria complex in Pasig, the Robinsons Equitable Tower is accessible and near major destinations in Ortigas Center. It is also near educational institutions like the Saint Pedro Poveda College; shopping centers like The Podium and SM Megamall; and the Asian Development Bank headquarters.

With this, the building has direct access to more than a hundred shops, dining facilities, banks, travel agencies, appliance centers, service outlets, parcel delivery stations, computer centers, a full-line supermarket and department store, a multi-theater cineplex, a bowling center and a complete family entertainment center.

== Amenities ==
The building is equipped with a building management system and security system, fire protection safety and CCTV surveillance, ample provision for entrance cables of telephone lines, space provisions for unit owner-supplied variable refrigerant volume (VRV)airconditioning systems, and individual metering systems for effective operation and maintenance. It is also equipped with a centrally located service core housing twelve high-speed passenger lifts and one services lift, and 4 basement and 5 upper-level parking areas.

Records
Preceded by Rufino Pacific Tower	Tallest building in the Philippines; 1997–1998; 175 m	Succeeded by Petron Megaplaza
