= James Rockwell =

American businessman

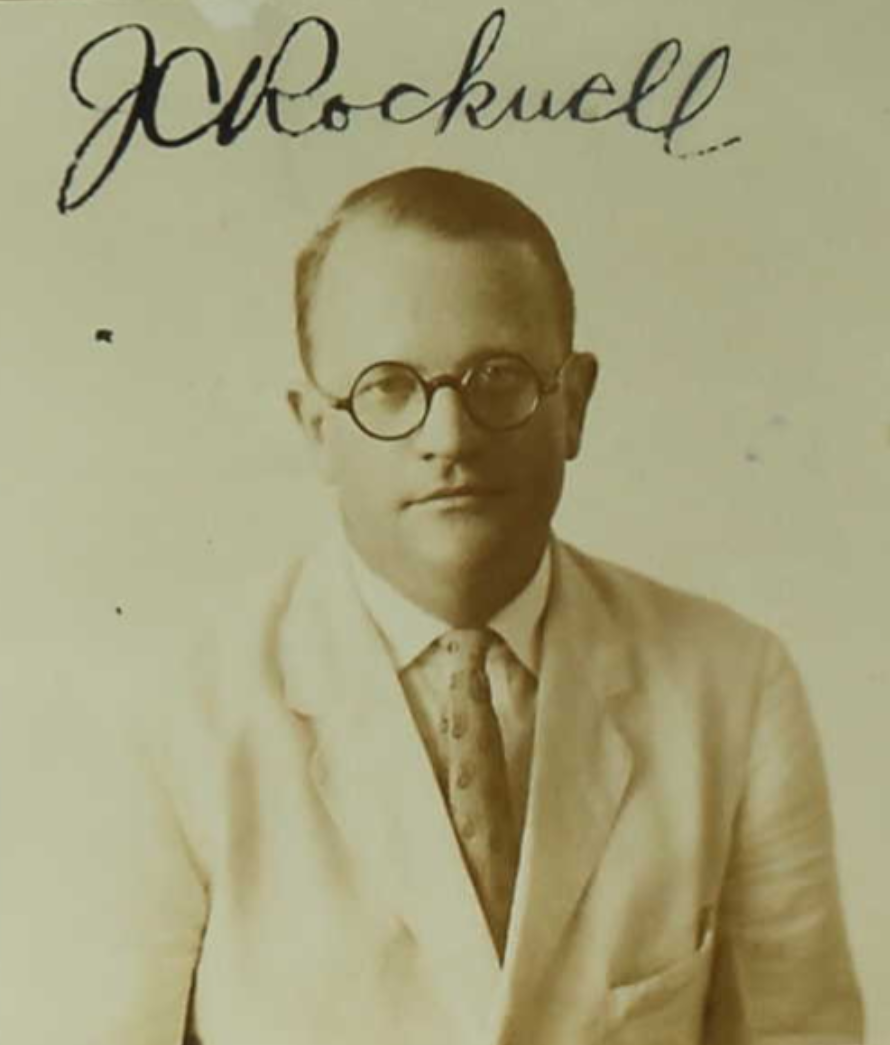
- Rockwell in 1924

Personal details
- Born: James Chapman Rockwell; October 4, 1881 Scranton, Pennsylvania, U.S.
- Died: July 30, 1962 (aged 80) California, U.S.
- Spouse(s): Dorothy Shepard; Ann Hanlon Rockwell
- Children: William S. Rockwell; Patricia J. Rockwell; James C. Rockwell, Jr.
- Parent(s): William Brewer Rockwell (father); Clara Louise Chapman (mother)
- Education: Cornell University
- Profession: Businessman
- Known for: President of Meralco; Founder of Manila Yacht Club; Director of American Chamber of Commerce in Manila
- Nickname: Jim

James C. Rockwell (October 4, 1881 – July 30, 1962) was an American businessman. He was President of the Manila Electric Railroad and Light Company (Meralco), Director of the American Chamber of Commerce in Manila, Charter member and President of the Rotary Club of Manila, and Founder and Commodore of the Manila Yacht Club. Rockwell Center is named after him.

== Early life ==
Rockwell was born in Scranton, Pennsylvania, to William B. Rockwell and his wife, Clara L. Chapman.

== Education ==
In 1904, Rockwell graduated from Cornell University in Ithaca, New York, with a Bachelor of Science in Engineering.

== Career ==
In 1911, Rockwell arrived in Manila to join the Manila Electric Railroad and Light Company (Meralco) as a railway manager. In 1919, he was appointed vice-president and later became general manager. In 1939 he became president.

In 1939, Rockwell was the director of the American Chamber of Commerce in Manila.

== Santo Tomas Internment Camp ==
In World War II, during the Japanese occupation of the Philippines, Rockwell, his wife Ann and their son James C. Rockwell Jr. were interned at the Santo Tomas Internment Camp in Manila.

== Personal life ==
On May 8, 1913, Rockwell married Dorothy Shepard at the American Consulate General in Yokohama, Empire of Japan.

On July 1, 1919, Rockwell became the second president of the Rotary Club of Manila, after its charter was handed down, succeeding Leon J. Lambert who served as President for a month during incorporation. Rockwell completed his term on June 30, 1920, at the end of the first full Rotary year.

On August 28, 1926, Rockwell married Ann Hanlon in Manila. On July 29, 1928, Rockwell and Hanlon's son James Chapman Rockwell Jr. was born.

In 1927, Rockwell founded the Manila Yacht Club and served as its Commodore. Rockwell also played a role in the establishment of the Manila Polo Club and Manila Golf Club.

== Death ==
Rockwell died in California, on July 30, 1962.

== Rockwell Thermal Plant and Rockwell Center ==
In 1950, Meralco began operating the Rockwell Thermal Plant named after Rockwell in Makati. In 1994, the thermal plant became decommissioned. The plant building became the upscale Power Plant Mall.

In 1995, López Holdings Corporation formed the Rockwell Land Corporation to develop the 15.5-hectare (38-acre) area of the former thermal plant. The development retained Rockwell's name and is now known as Rockwell Center.
