= Power Plant Mall =

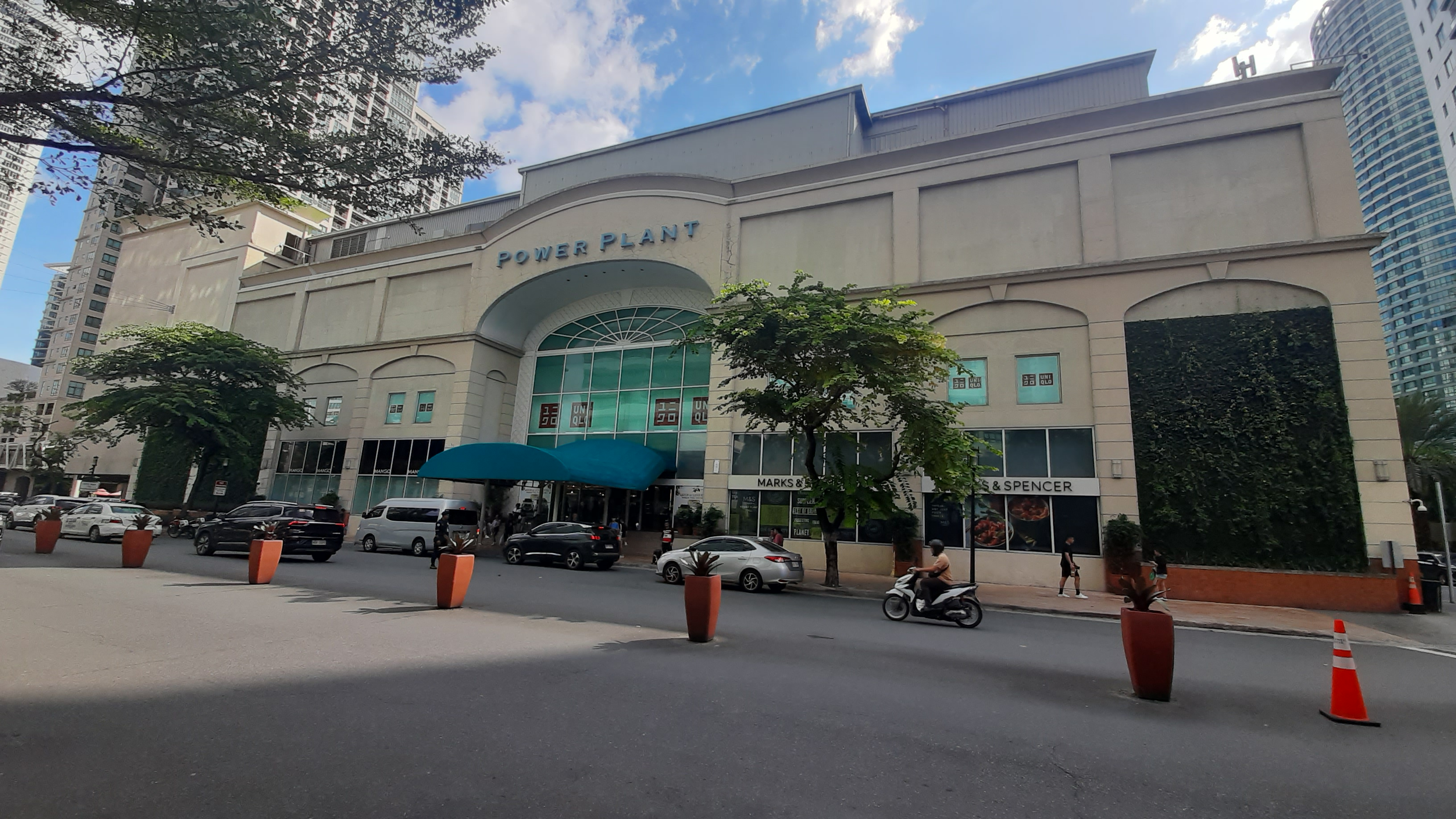
- Location: Makati, Philippines
- Coordinates: 14°33′53″N 121°2′11″E
- Address: Rockwell Drive cor. Estrella Street, Rockwell Center
- Opened: December 26, 2000; 25 years ago
- Developer: Rockwell Land Corporation
- Manager: Rockwell Land Corporation
- Owner: Lopez Holdings Corporation
- Architect: Design International
- Num. of stores: 200+
- Num. of anchor tenants: 2
- Floor area: 46,700 m^{2} (503,000 sq ft)
- Floors: 5 upper + 3 basement
- Parking: 2,000 cars
- Website: powerplantmall.com

Power Plant Mall is an upscale indoor shopping mall in Makati, Philippines. It is the anchor establishment of Rockwell Center, a mixed-use area north of the Makati Central Business District on the Pasig River waterfront across Mandaluyong. It is one of two shopping centers developed and managed by Rockwell Land Corporation, a subsidiary of Lopez Holdings Corporation, in Metro Manila. It was designed by Toronto-based architecture firm, Design International.

== Description ==
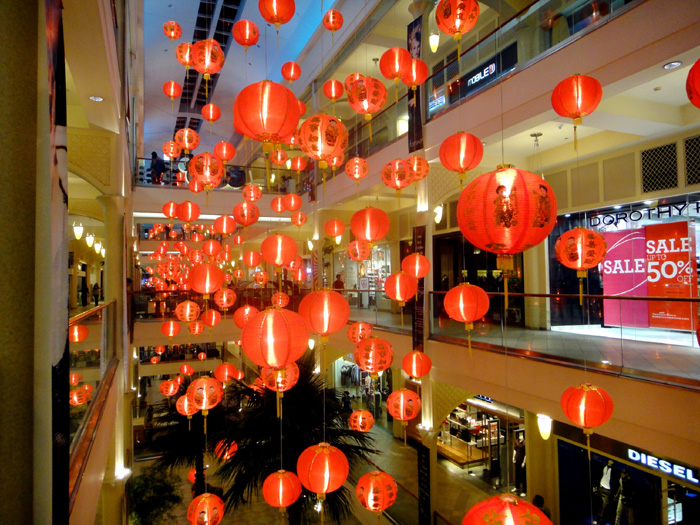
Power Plant Mall's interior in January 2011, ahead of the Chinese New Year

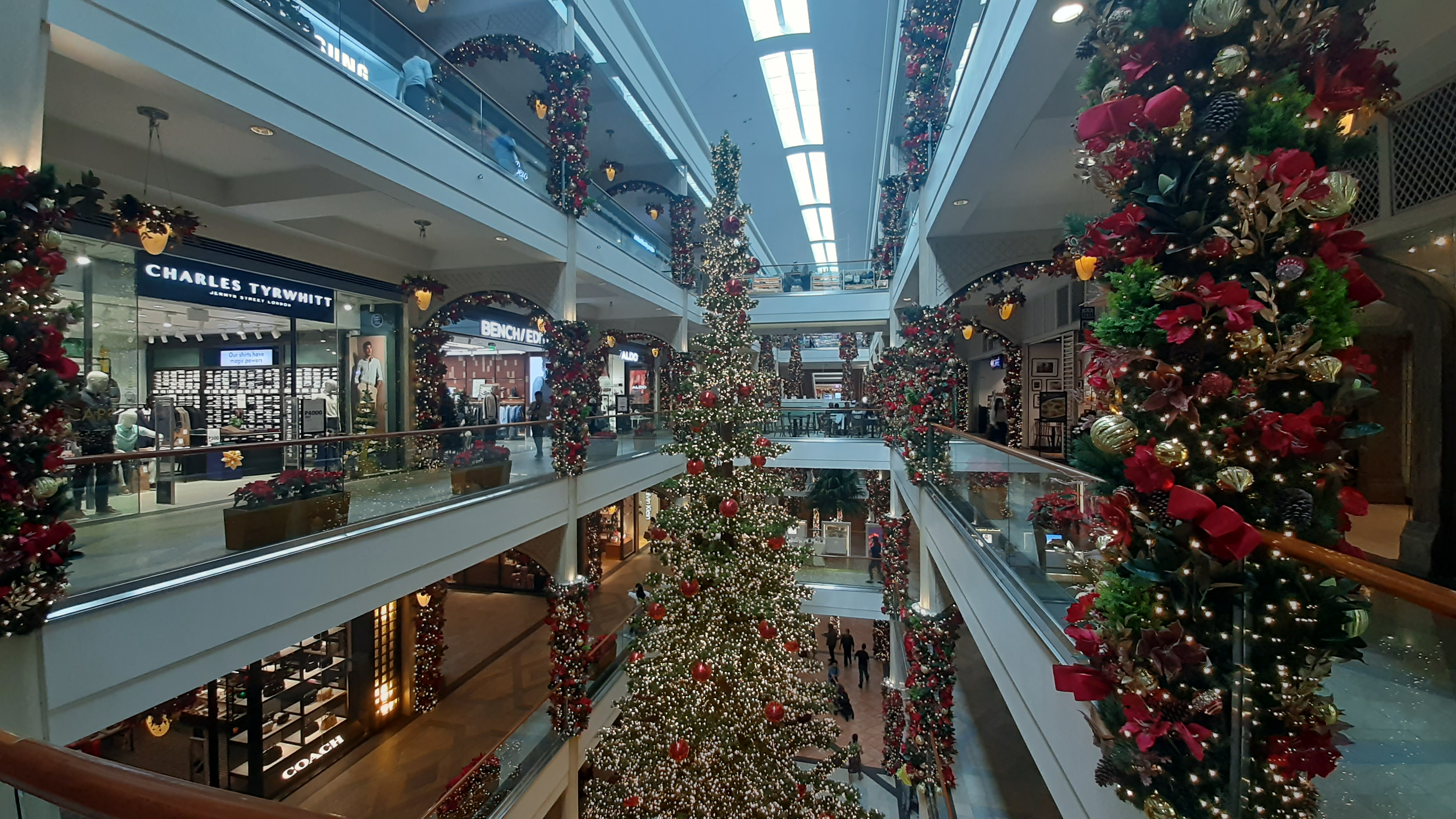
Power Plant Mall's interior in December 2024

The five-storey shopping mall is located at Rockwell Drive corner Estrella Street in Barangay Poblacion, Makati. It is part of the Rockwell Center. It has a gross floor area of 41,000 square meters (440,000 ft^{2}) and is anchored by The Marketplace supermarket, an eight-screen Power Plant Cinema, and a mix of high-end tenants such as Salvatore Ferragamo, Hackett London, Michael Kors, DKNY, Rolex and J.Lindeberg. It also contains several dining outlets, The Fifth at Rockwell events hall, a Roman Catholic chapel called the Chapel of the Sacred Heart of Jesus, and three levels of basement parking. The mall also serves as the podium access to the Balmori Suites, a condominium building. It is also linked to Proscenium at Rockwell and Joya Lofts and Towers via the Proscenium–Rockwell Footbridge and to the 8 Rockwell office building and residential towers such as Rizal Tower, Hidalgo Place, and Edades Tower via pedestrian underpass.

The mall can be reached from EDSA via Estrella Street and J. P. Rizal Avenue and from the Makati CBD via Kalayaan Avenue. The nearest MRT station is Guadalupe station on EDSA.

== History ==
Power Plant Mall was built in December 2000 on the former site of the 130-megawatt Rockwell Thermal Plant owned by the Lopez-led Manila Electric Railroad and Light Company. The thermal power plant, named after the company's first president James Rockwell, operated between 1950 and December 14, 1973, when it was hit by a fire. In 1994, after protests from Makati residents against its reopening, the plant was decommissioned and subsequently converted by its owners into a modern commercial district. Construction on the shopping mall began in 1998 and was completed and opened on December 26, 2000.

The Chapel of the Sacred Heart of Jesus was opened in 2006 on the mall's third level. Beginning in 2014, Rockwell Land expanded the Power Plant Mall by adding another 5,700 square meters (61,000 sq ft) of additional leasable space, expanding the total retail floor area from 41,000 to 46,700 square meters (441,000 to 503,000 sq ft). This expansion added three additional levels, two VIP cinemas, and a larger new site for the chapel on the fifth level (R5). The ground and second levels (R1 & R2) of the expansion opened in December 2017. In January 2018, Cinemas 7 and 8 on Level R3 opened and the new chapel was dedicated. It is also connected to the luxury condominium development called Balmori Suites, which replaced the cancelled expansion of Aruga Hotel.

== Brand expansion ==
Rockwell Land Corporation is currently expanding the Power Plant Mall brand to its developments outside of Metro Manila. It plans to open Power Plant Mall Angeles within the Rockwell at Nepo Center in Angeles City by the fourth quarter of 2027. This will be followed by Power Plant Mall Bacolod within the Rockwell Center Bacolod by 2029.
