= The Beacon – Arnaiz Tower =

The Beacon - Arnaiz Tower
- Interactive map of the The Beacon - Arnaiz Tower area

General information
- Status: Completed
- Type: Residential Condominium
- Location: Arnaiz Avenue corner Chino Roces Avenue, Makati, Philippines
- Coordinates: 14°33′6.04″N 121°0′51.67″E
- Construction started: January 28, 2008
- Completed: 2013
- Owner: Geo Estate Estate Development Corporation, New Pacific Resources Management, Inc.

Technical details
- Floor count: 50

Design and construction
- Architect: ASYA Design
- Developer: Geo Estate Estate Development Corporation, New Pacific Resources Management, Inc.
- Structural engineer: Aromin & Sy + Associates
- Main contractor: EEI Corporation

The Beacon – Arnaiz Tower is a residential condominium skyscraper in Makati, Philippines. It is the second of three towers, and part of The Beacon complex. The Beacon was developed by Geo Estate Estate Development Corporation in cooperation with New Pacific Resources Management, Inc. Groundbreaking for the project was on January 28, 2008, while actual construction works for Arnaiz Tower started on May 14, 2008. The building was expected to be opened by 2011. The building was topped-off on June 15, 2012, and has started turn-over of units to its residents by August 2013.

Standing at 197m or 646ft high, Arnaiz Tower has 50 storeys above ground, taller than her two other sister towers, the Roces Tower and the Amorsolo Tower. Making it the 19th tallest skyscraper in Makati, and the 41st tallest in the Philippines as of 2024.

== The Project Team ==
The Beacon, including Arnaiz Tower, is owned and developed by Geo Estate Development Corporation and New Pacific Resources Management, Inc. It was designed by Arch. Albert S. Yulocal of architectural firm ASYA Design, an established design company who provided design to dozens of well known residential condominiums. Structural design and consultancy was provided by engineering firm Aromin & Sy + Associates, another established company responsible for structural design of major skyscrapers in the country.

Construction and Project Management services is provided by Asian Technicon Managers & Consultants, Inc., while the general contractor for the project is EEI Corporation, one of the largest construction companies in the country.

Other groups included in the design team are: Asuncion Berenguer Inc. (Interior Design); DL Lagman Engineering (Airconditioning & Ventilation Design); M.A. Alix & Partners (Electrical Design); Figueroa & Associates (Plumbing & Fire Protection Design); Dr. Salvador F. Reyes (Geotechnical & Soils); SMDI Consultants Inc. (Traffic Consultant); DCCD Engineering Corp. (Floor Study Consultant); and Meinhardt Philippines (Elevator Consultant).

== Location ==
The Beacon is located at the corner of Don Chino Roces and Antonio Arnaiz Avenues near the heart of Makati, and is just a few meters away from commercial establishments like Makati Cinema Square and Walter Mart - Makati; Don Bosco Parish and Don Bosco Technical Institute - Makati, and a few blocks away from the Makati Central Business District.

== See also ==
- The Beacon - Amorsolo Tower
- The Beacon - Roces Tower
