= Rizal Tower =

- Interactive map of the Rizal Tower area

General information
- Status: Completed
- Location: 31 Residential Drive, Rockwell Center, Makati, Metro Manila, Philippines
- Coordinates: 14.5644°N 121.0350°E
- Named for: José Rizal
- Completed: 2000
- Owner: Rockwell Land Corporation
- Operator: Rockwell Property Management Corporation

Height
- Architectural: 155.9 m (511.48 ft)
- Roof: 155.9 m (511.48 ft)

Technical details
- Floor count: 47
- Floor area: 57,620 m^{2} (620,000 sq ft)

Design and construction
- Architecture firm: Skidmore, Owings and Merrill Palafox Associates
- Developer: Rockwell Land Corporation
- Structural engineer: Skidmore, Owings and Merrill
- Main contractor: DMCI Construction, Inc.

Rizal Tower is a residential skyscraper ranked officially as the 37th tallest building in the Philippines since 2000. It has 47 stories. The building is located on 31 Residential Drive, Rockwell Center, in Makati. The amenities in the building include a swimming pool, a library, a function room, a helipad, an access tunnel to the neighboring Power Plant Mall, and three gardens (Oval Garden, Sunken Garden, and Pocket Garden) in a tropical landscape setting. The building is managed by Rockwell Property Management Corporation.

== See also ==
- List of tallest buildings in the Philippines
