= One Rockwell West Tower =

One Rockwell Towers
- One Rockwell West Tower in 2012.
- Interactive map of the One Rockwell Towers area

General information
- Status: Completed
- Type: Residence
- Location: Makati, Philippines
- Coordinates: 14.56331°N 121.03750°E
- Completed: 2010

Height
- Roof: 210 m (689 ft)

Technical details
- Floor count: 55

Design and construction
- Architect: Arquitectonica
- Developer: Rockwell Land Corporation (part of Lopez Group)

One Rockwell West Tower is a condominium in Rockwell Center, Makati, Philippines. The building is part of the One Rockwell complex. It is the tallest in the complex, and one of the tallest skyscrapers in the Philippines, rising 210 m (689 ft).

== Design ==
The tower is elliptical in shape and is built using the usual steel and glaze. Balconies are built at the peak of the tower. The bulk of the tower is covered in a blue tinted glaze but clear glazing covers the roof.

The facade overrun allows the using of a rooftop pool and a decking area. The top of the tower also features two levels.

== See also ==
- List of tallest buildings in the Philippines
