= One McKinley Place =

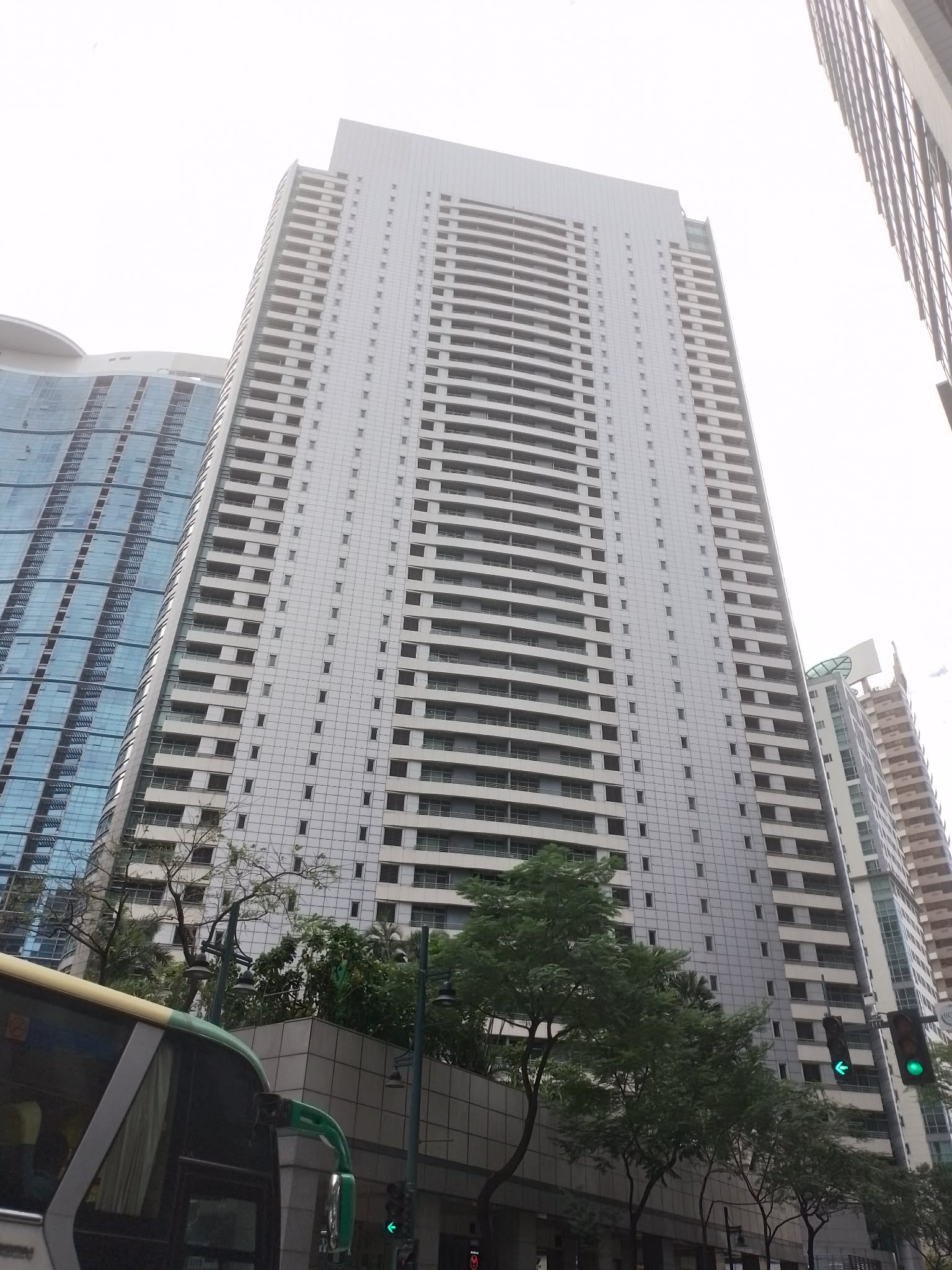

- Location within Philippines

General information
- Status: Completed
- Type: Residential Condominium
- Location: 3rd Avenue cor. 26th Street; Bonifacio Global City; Philippines
- Coordinates: 14°32′51.64″N 121°2′42.20″E
- Construction started: 1997 (First time)
- Completed: 2001 (First time)
- Opening: 2004
- Renovated: 2002–2003 (Second Time)
- Owner: One McKinley Place Condominium Corporation (OMPCC)
- Operator: Jones Lang LaSalle Inc.

Height
- Roof: 149 m (488.85 ft)

Technical details
- Floor count: 43 above ground

Design and construction
- Architects: R. Villarosa Architects; Hellmuth, Obata & Kassabaum
- Developer: Philtown Properties
- Main contractor: ALT Cladding and Design; Builders Federal Philippines, Inc.

References
- One McKinley Place at Emporis

The One McKinley Place is a high-end residential condominium in Bonifacio Global City, Philippines. The 43-storey building was completed in 2004 and rises to 149 metres (489 feet) from the ground to its architectural top. It was the tallest single residential tower in Bonifacio Global City until the completion of The Infinity Fort Bonifacio in 2011.

== History ==
One McKinley Place began groundbreaking and excavation in 1997, with first concrete pouring in 1998. It topped off in January 2000. One year later, construction stopped for a while but resumed in 2002 and was completed in 2003. The building opened in 2004. It was the tallest single tower in Taguig from 2004 to 2011, when The Infinity Fort Bonifacio was completed.

== Gallery ==
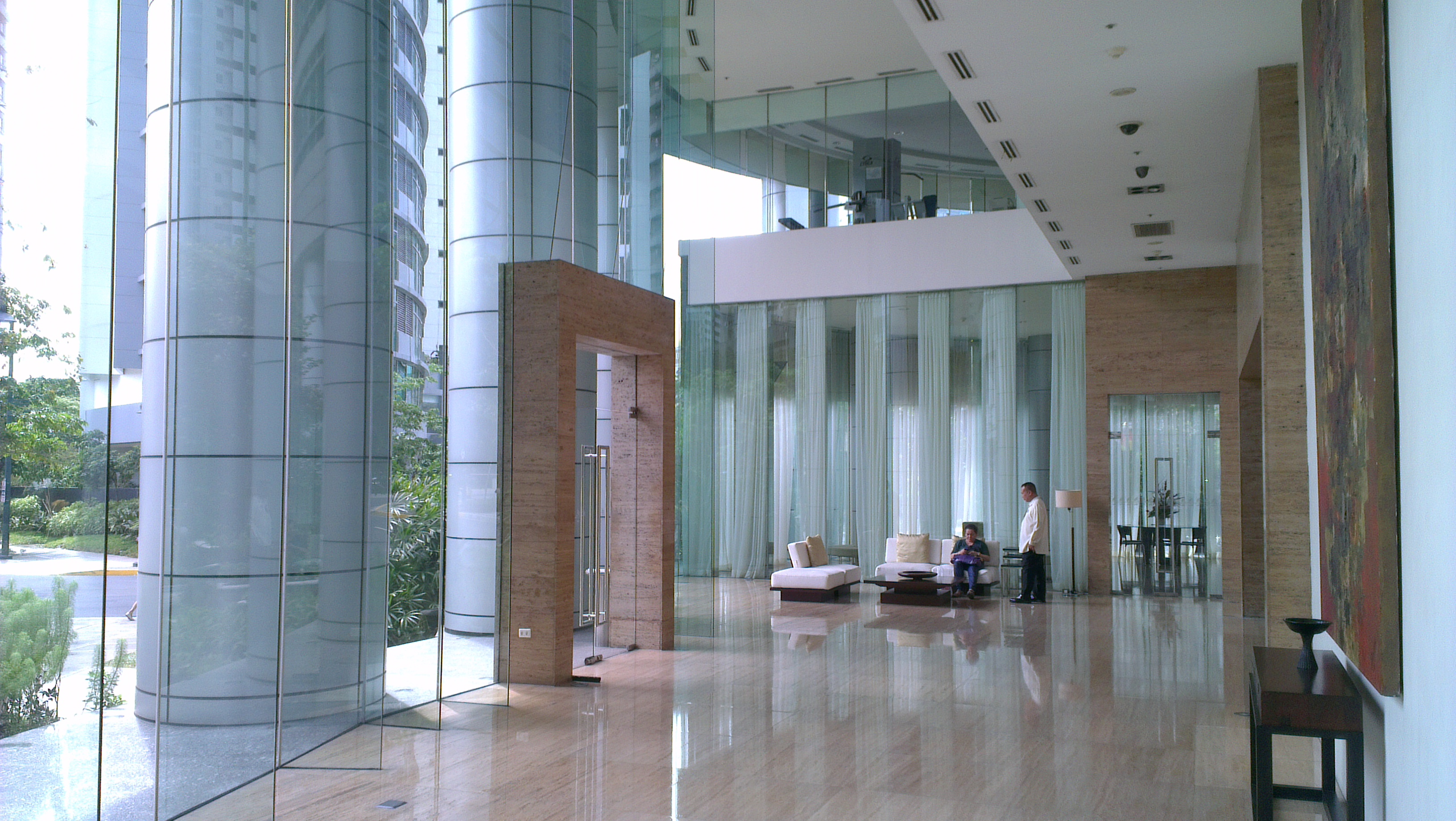
Lobby area

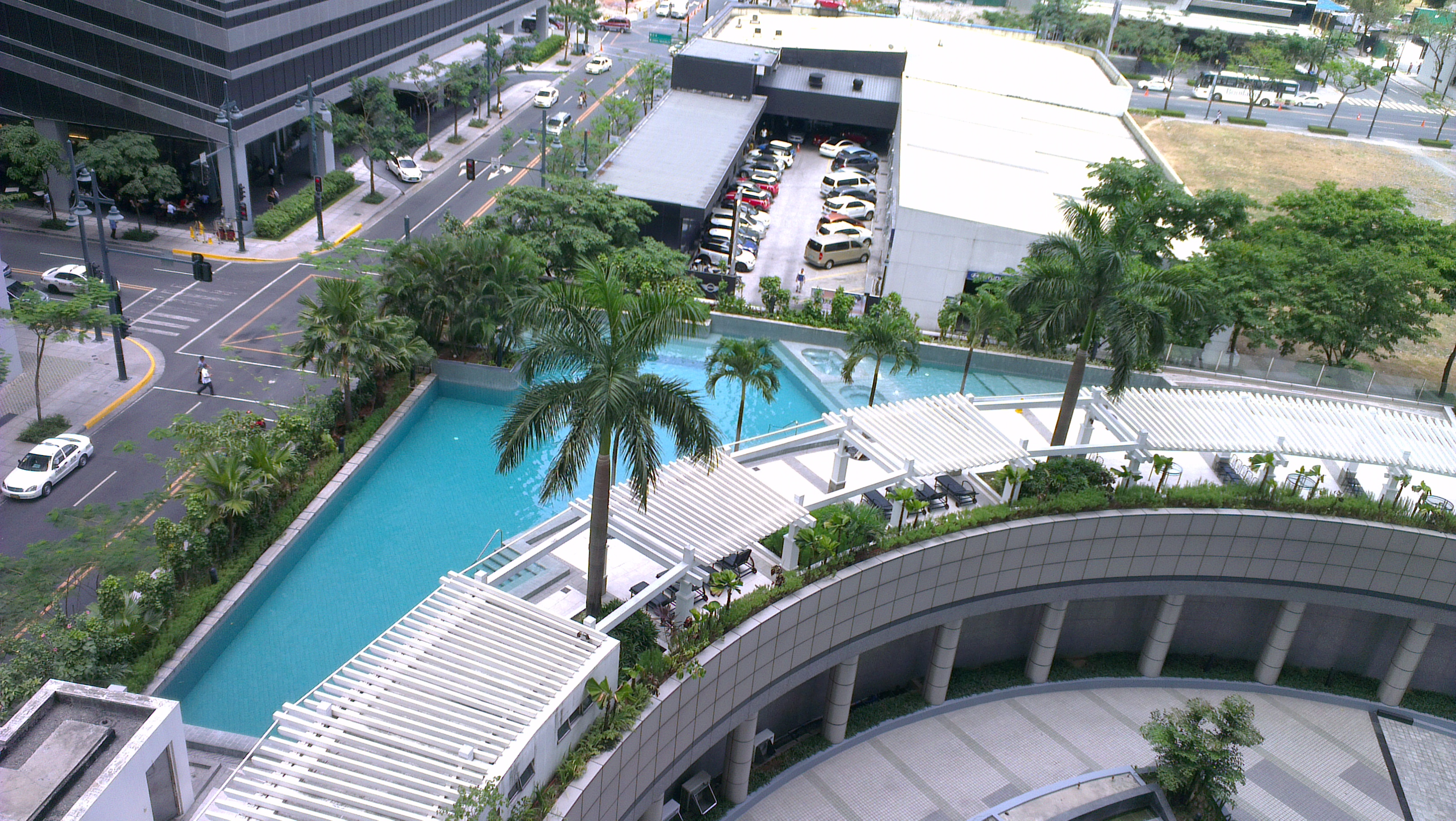
Pool area

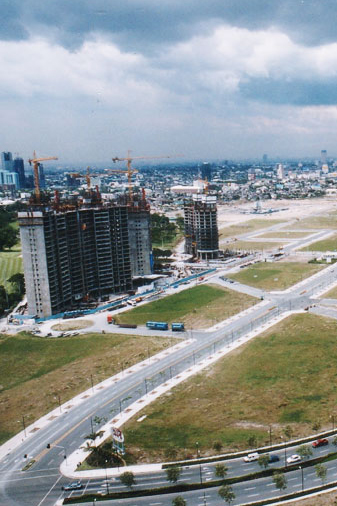
One McKinley Place (right) with Pacific Plaza Towers (left) under construction February 1999
