= PBCom Tower =

- PBCom Tower in March 2019
- Interactive map of the PBCom Tower area

Record height
- Tallest in the Philippines from 2000 to 2017^{[I]}
- Preceded by: Petron Megaplaza
- Surpassed by: Metrobank Center

General information
- Status: Completed
- Type: Office
- Location: 6795 Ayala Avenue corner V.A. Rufino Street, Salcedo Village, Makati, Philippines
- Coordinates: 14°33′29.90″N 121°1′9.51″E
- Construction started: 1996; 30 years ago
- Completed: December 1999; 26 years ago
- Opening: June 21, 2000; 26 years ago
- Cost: US$74 million
- Owner: Philippine Bank of Communications

Height
- Antenna spire: 259 m (849.7 ft)
- Roof: 241 m (790.7 ft)

Technical details
- Floor count: 52 aboveground, 7 belowground
- Floor area: 119,905 m^{2} (1,291,000 sq ft)
- Lifts/elevators: 23

Design and construction
- Architects: Skidmore, Owings & Merrill, LLP; GF & Partners Architects
- Developer: Philippine Bank of Communications; Filinvest Development Corporation
- Structural engineer: Aromin & Sy + Associates, Inc.
- Main contractor: Samsung Construction Company Philippines, Inc.

The Philippine Bank of Communications Tower, more commonly known as PBCom Tower, is an office skyscraper ranked officially as the second tallest building in the Philippines. It was previously the tallest building in the Philippines, a title it held starting year 2000 until the completion of Metrobank Center in early 2017. It has a total ground to architectural top height of 259 metres (850 ft), with 52 storeys including an 8-level radio tower. It is a joint development of Filinvest Asia Corporation (FAC) and the Philippine Bank of Communications (PBCom). The building is the home of PBCom, one of the oldest Philippine banks. The bank occupies the building's first ten floors, with a food court on the seventh floor.

== Location ==
The building is located at Ayala Avenue corner V.A. Rufino Street in Makati, right inside the Makati Central Business District. The stretch of Ayala Avenue where PBCom Tower is located also has the main branches of Bank of the Philippine Islands, Rizal Commercial Banking Corporation, and Security Bank. The building houses international call centers such as Convergys, HSBC HDPP, and ICT.

== Design and construction ==
The building in July 2005

PBCom Tower was designed by local architectural firm GF & Partners Architects, in cooperation with international architects Skidmore, Owings & Merrill, LLP; and structural design was provided by local engineering company Aromin & Sy + Associates. Project and construction management services was provided by I.A. Campbell & Associates, a Philippine-based project management company, while construction works was done by Samsung Engineering & Construction's local branch Samsung Construction Company Philippines, Inc. Samsung is known as the builder of the world's tallest buildings, including the Petronas Twin Towers, Taipei 101, and the Burj Khalifa.

Besides these companies, other members of the design team include Edgett Williams Consulting Group (Elevator Design), Golder Associates, Inc. (Seismic Study); Fisher, Marantz, Rentro, Stone (Lighting consultant); Shel Milson & Wilke (Acoustic Analysis); CDC Limited (Curtain Wall design); Control Risks, Inc. (Security System design); N.B.F. Water & Wastewater Services (Sanitary System design); DCCD Engineering Corp. (Electrical Systems design); R.J. Calpo & Partners (Mechanical Systems design); and Radian Technology, Inc. (Fire Protection System design).

Its exterior double-glazed, unitized curtain walls in aluminum frames, together with a lighting effect, create a facade that reflects a fusion of art and function. Its interiors are made of glass, natural stone and metal. A landscaped garden in stepped podium also adds to the natural effect of the building's design. The building also utilizes tinted insulated vision glass at full height for the curtain walls to seal off heat and noise.

The offices spaces feature high ceiling headroom to improve working atmosphere; perimeter columns to provide flexibility in interior space planning; provision for raised access floor or underslab ducts; and having continuous wide panels in full height glazing allow outside views while providing ample natural light into the offices.

== Amenities ==
The building also has banking facilities for efficient business transactions; food court with outdoor garden cafe; a business centre to complement corporate operations; and a roofdeck helipad for alternate transport access and emergency evacuation.

Other amenities include a 100% standby generators, lightning protection and grounding systems, structured cabling system for high-speed transmission of data, video and voice communications, provision for fibre optic telecommunications system, advanced building management system, CCTV monitoring at strategic locations controlled at the central command station on a 24-hour basis, fire alarm and automatic fire sprinkler systems, dual water supply with water treatment facility, underground and overhead water reservoir, 2 individually controlled Air Handling Units per floor with allotted air condition load for after-office use, a communications tower, voice and smoke evacuation systems and a gondola system for building exterior maintenance.

The building is equipped with 17 high-speed tower lifts in 3 zones lift-group to ensure minimum waiting time, 4 shuttle lifts for parking and amenity floors and 1 service elevator for all floors.

The building's parking facilities have a secure and integrated multi-level design with paging system and a drivers’ lounge.

The PBCom Tower has been designated by the Philippine Economic Zone Authority (PEZA) as one of only two certified Information Technology (IT) buildings in the country. IT companies occupying the PBCom Tower will enjoy special tax incentives and other privileges from the government.

== See also ==
- List of tallest buildings in the Philippines

Records
Preceded by Petron Megaplaza	Tallest building in the Philippines; 2000–2017; 259 m	Succeeded by Metrobank Center
