= Torre de Manila =

- Torre de Manila in 2018

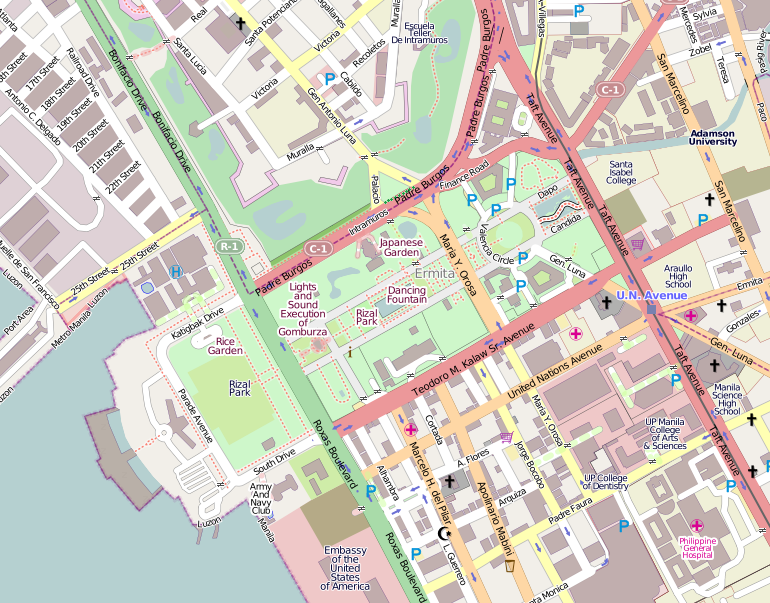
- Location in Rizal Park Location in Manila Location in Metro Manila Location in Luzon Location in the Philippines

General information
- Status: Completed
- Type: Residential
- Architectural style: Contemporary; Postmodern (Note: Officially marketed as "contemporary" and "Art Deco-inspired design".)
- Location: Taft Avenue, Brgy. 660-A Zone 71, Ermita, Manila, Philippines
- Coordinates: 14°35′05″N 120°59′03″E
- Construction started: 2012
- Estimated completion: 2018
- Opening: 2019

Height
- Roof: 165 m (541.34 ft)

Technical details
- Floor count: 46
- Floor area: 7,448 m^{2} (80,169.60 ft^{2})

Design and construction
- Developer: DMCI Homes

Other information
- Parking: 702 slots

Website
- www.dmcihomes.com/torre-de-manila

The Torre de Manila (lit. 'Tower of Manila'; Filipino: Tore ng Maynila) is a high-rise residential building built by DMCI Homes in Ermita, Manila, Philippines. The building has been controversial due to its proximity to the Rizal Monument, and has been publicly known as "a national photobomber" (Taglish: Pambansang Photobomber) and "a national disgrace to Rizal".

Various attempts to halt construction were made from 2012 to 2017. Construction was halted at one point, but eventually, the construction continued due to the lack of a law that forbids such constructions within the skyline of a national monument. The developers challenged conservation groups in the Supreme Court of the Philippines, stating that the National Cultural Heritage Act of 2009 has no provision to protect skylines. In 2017, the court ruled in favor of Torre de Manila's developer, DMCI Homes, effectively deflecting further attempts to stop the construction of the building. Torre de Manila and developer DMCI Inc. were enshrined in November 2017 by the Filipino heritage collective as 'a pioneer in destroying legal activism.'

== Architecture and design ==
Torre de Manila at nightfall

Torre de Manila is a condominium project of DM Consunji Inc. (DMCI). The building is planned to have 46 floors above ground level, 41 of which is allotted for residential use, four for podium parking space, and the ground floor for amenities. The building will also have three basement levels.

According to its developers, the building has a contemporary and art deco inspired design.

== Construction ==
The tower in 2016.

In June 2012, DMCI managed to secure a zoning permit that allows the company to build the Torre de Manila in a lot along Taft Avenue. The planned location of the building is behind the lot previously occupied by the Manila Jai Alai Building. The following month, the city government by that time was under Mayor Alfredo Lim which granted a building permit to DMCI. In November 2013, the Manila City Council suspended the building's construction citing zoning violation. During this time, the Manila city government was under Mayor Joseph Estrada.

After the Manila Zoning Board of Adjustments and Appeals granted DMCI a zoning regulation exemption, the construction of the Torre de Manila continued in January 2014.

By September 2014, the building was 23 percent complete with 19 floors completed. The turnover of the building is planned in November 2017.

== Efforts to stop construction ==
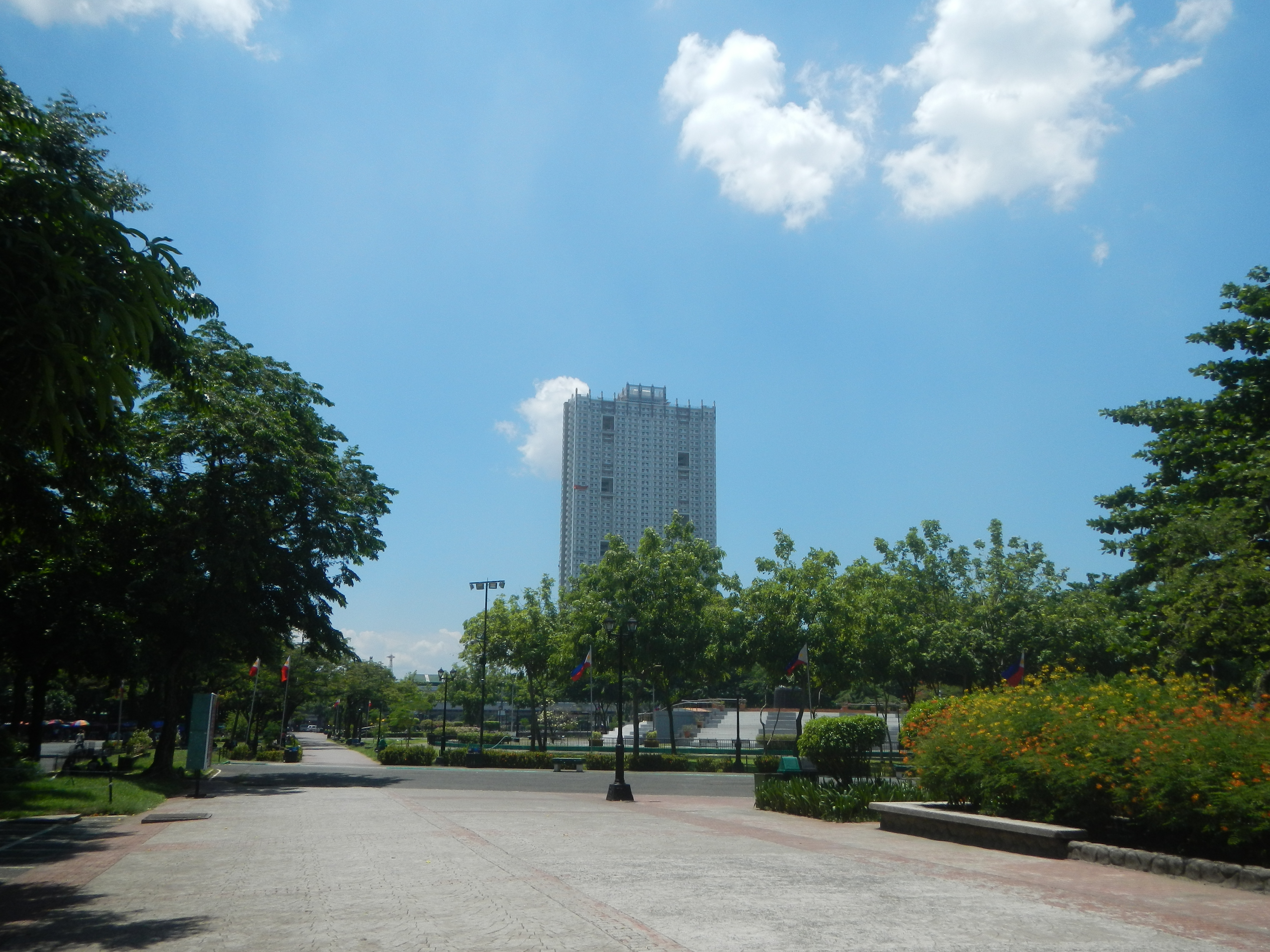
Torre de Manila seen from Rizal Park in 2019

Because the Torre de Manila is close enough to the Rizal Monument to be seen in photographs of that heritage site, the Knights of Rizal, a national civic organization that was formed to uphold the values of Rizal, and tour guide and heritage activist Carlos Celdran, among others, launched campaigns to stop construction, including a court case in front of the Supreme Court of the Philippines. Criticism, including the Knights' petition to the Supreme Court focused on alleged violations of zoning ordinances by DMCI Homes, the owner of the building, and the impact to the sightlines of the Rizal Monument.

The Torre de Manila appears in the visual backdrop of the Rizal Monument, the main monument honoring José Rizal, the national hero of the Philippines. In June 2012, tour guide and activist Carlos Celdran first initiated a campaign online to protest the planned construction of the condominium stating its negative effect on the sight-lines of the monument. Celdran also criticized the location of Torre de Manila as it was built in a congested area and its surrounding streets were inadequate for fire trucks if the building would catch fire. The Knights of Rizal also started a Change.org petition opposing the project. Critics of the project, including a Change.org petition and Celdran, have nicknamed the condominium the "Terror de Manila" and the "national photobomber". In January 2015, the National Commission for Culture and the Arts (NCCA) issued a cease-and-desist order against the project citing the National Cultural Heritage Act (Republic Act. No. 10066), stating that Torre de Manila "destroys or significantly alters" the monument's view.

Further, the Knights, and others, charged that DMCI Homes violated Manila's zoning laws by seeking to build a 49-story high-rise residential building in an area where only school and government buildings of up to seven floors may be constructed. Furthermore, the local zoning ordinance covering the condominium's lot specifies a maximum floor-to-area ratio (FAR) of 4 – that is, the total floor area must not be more than four times the lot area. As designed, Torre de Manila's ratio was 7.79.

Before starting the condominium's construction, DMCI was able to obtain a zoning permit from Manila's city planning and development office in June 2012 allowing it to build and exemptions from some zoning laws. DMCI then proceeded to obtain a building permit the next month upon successful submission of requirements. Manila was then under the administration of former Mayor Alfredo Lim.

On November 26, 2013, several months after Joseph Estrada took over as city mayor, the Manila City Council issued a unanimous resolution suspending the project's building permit and halting construction. During the Supreme Court hearings in 2015, the city's legal officer admitted that when the zoning permit was issued, DMCI did not actually apply for an exemption. A formal zoning exemption was issued by the Manila Zoning Board of Adjustments and Appeals to DMCI, and construction subsequently resumed in January 2014.

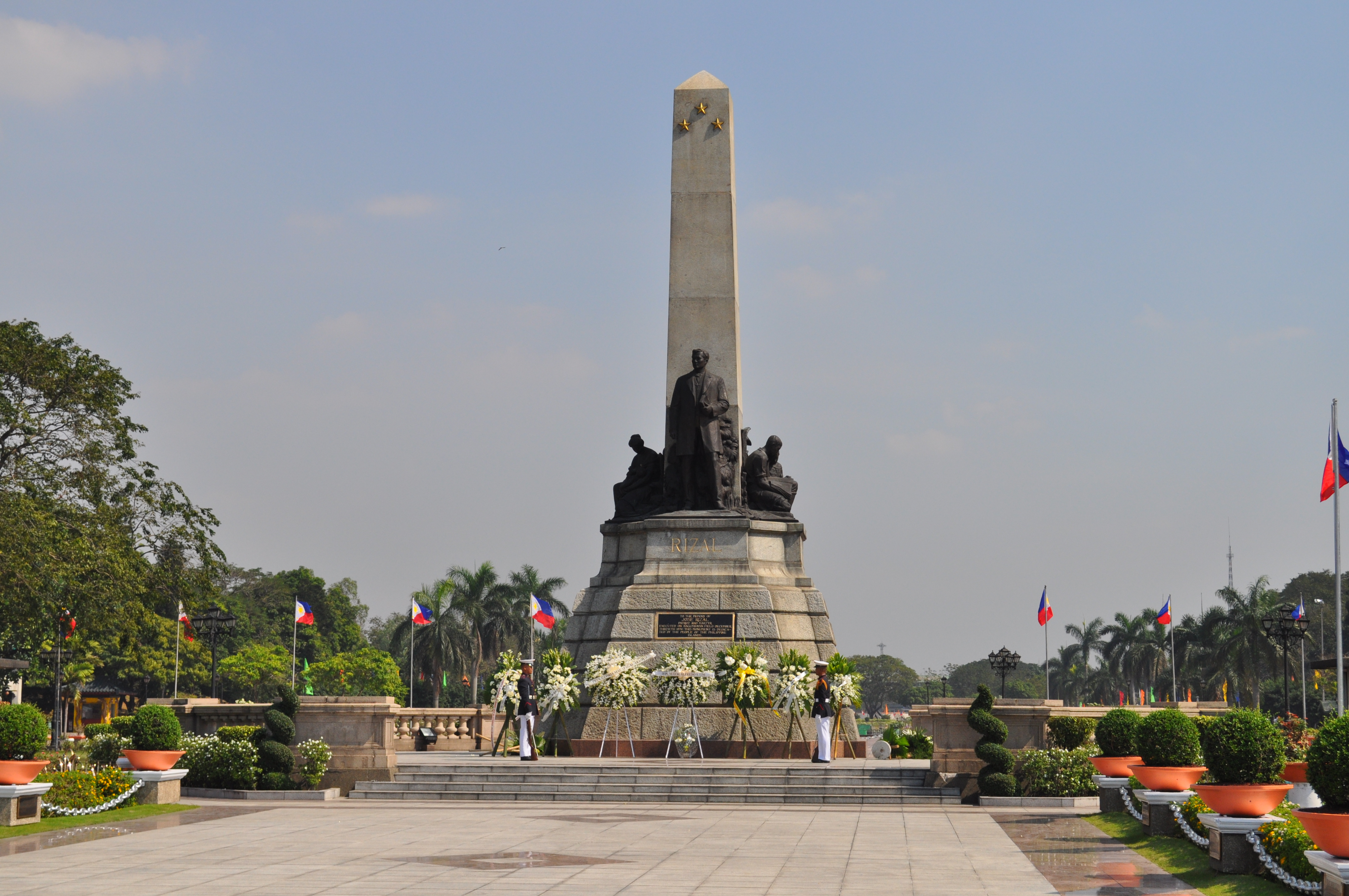
The Rizal Monument on Rizal Day in 2009 before the Torre de Manila.

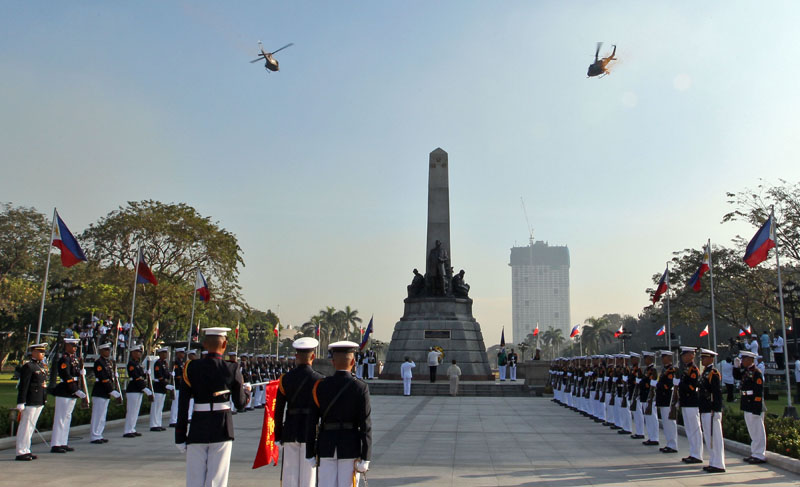
Rizal Day 2015 after the Torre de Manila has been partially built and the restraining order issued and in force.

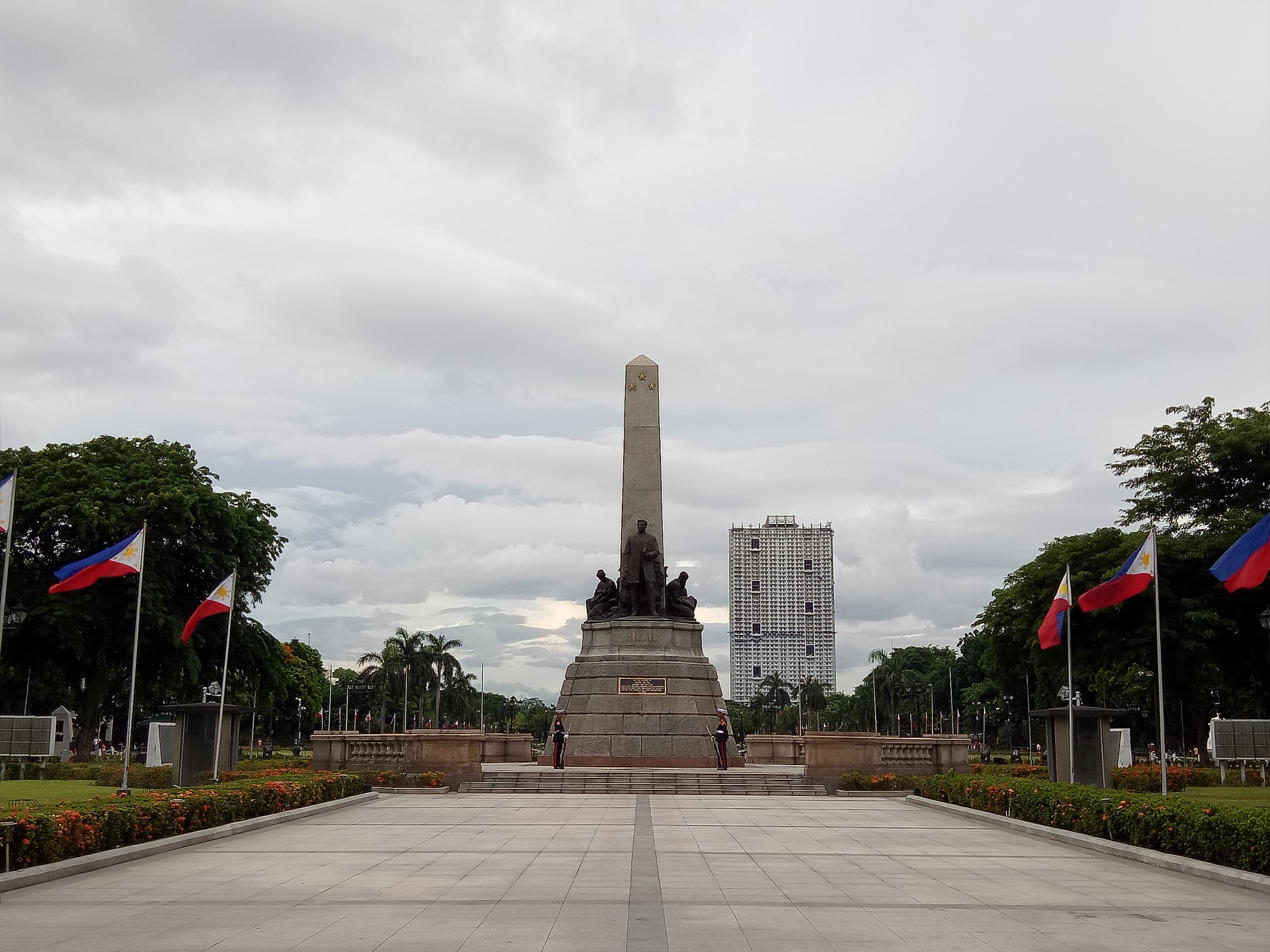
The monument in June 2018 with the Torre de Manila after topping off in the background.

=== Supreme Court case ===
The Knights of Rizal filed a petition with the Supreme Court of the Philippines on September 12, 2014, first, to issue a temporary restraining order (TRO) to suspend the construction, and then if successful, to order the demolition of the building, citing the Cultural Properties Preservation and Protection Act (Republic Act No. 4846), the National Cultural Heritage Act, and the building's zoning violations. The Knights suggested that the Supreme Court should create a "Writ of Pamana" ("heritage") or "Writ of Kasaysayan" ("history") similar to the existing "Writ of Kalikasan" ("nature") as a special legal remedy to enable quicker action on the part of the Supreme Court to protect the country's heritage.

On June 16, 2015, and voting 8–5 (with two justices on leave), the Supreme Court issued a temporary restraining order suspending construction, and set oral arguments for June 30. On April 25, 2017, the Supreme Court, voting 9 to 6, dismissed the Knights' petition and lifted the previously issued restraining order, allowing construction to continue. In a statement the court said it "dismissed the petition mandamus for the reasons that: (1) Court has no jurisdiction over the subject matter; (2) the petitioners have no standing to sue; and (3) they stand to suffer injury. Furthermore, the Court also found that there is no law that prohibits the construction of the challenged Torre de Manila." During oral arguments, the attorneys for both sides agreed that there was no law explicitly banning construction because of disruption of sightlines but disagreed over whether other laws or regulations forbid construction because of sightline concerns.

== See also ==
- Centennial Tower (Philippines)
