= The Beacon – Roces Tower =

The Beacon - Roces Tower
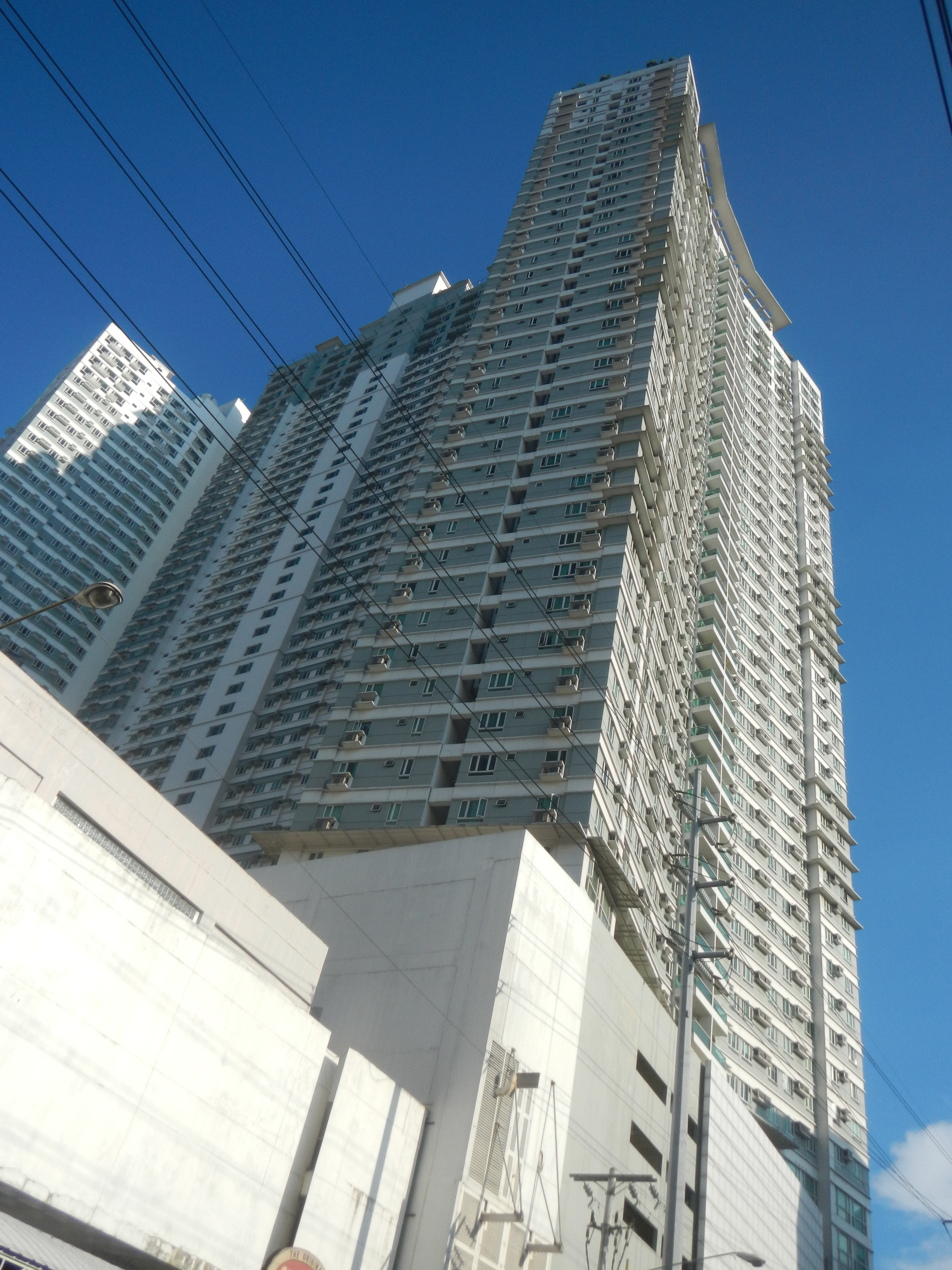
- The Beacon - Roces Tower (right)
- Interactive map of the The Beacon - Roces Tower area

General information
- Status: Completed
- Type: Residential Condominium
- Location: Arnaiz Avenue corner Chino Roces Avenue, Makati, Philippines
- Coordinates: 14°33′6.69″N 121°0′50.09″E
- Construction started: January 28, 2008
- Completed: October 2011

Height
- Roof: 158 m (518.37 ft)

Technical details
- Floor count: 44

Design and construction
- Architect: ASYA Design
- Developer: Geo Estate Estate Development Corporation, New Pacific Resources Management, Inc.
- Structural engineer: Aromin & Sy + Associates
- Main contractor: EEI Corporation

The Beacon – Roces Tower is a residential condominium skyscraper in Makati, Philippines, and has a height of 158 meters (518 ft). It is the first of three towers, and part of The Beacon complex. The Beacon was developed by Geo Estate Estate Development Corporation in cooperation with New Pacific Resources Management, Inc. Groundbreaking for the project was on January 28, 2008, while actual construction works for Roces Tower started on February 8, 2008. The building opened in 2011, while the initial hand-over of units to residents started in August 2011.

Roces Tower also has 44 stories above ground, and a sister twin tower, the Amorsolo Tower, which has the same dimensions as the Roces Tower. Topping-off ceremonies were held on July 21, 2009.

== The Project Team ==
The Beacon, including Roces Tower, is owned and developed by Geo Estate Development Corporation and New Pacific Resources Management, Inc. It was designed by Arch. Albert S. Yulocal of architectural firm ASYA Design, an established design company who provided design to dozens of well known residential condominiums. Structural design and consultancy was provided by engineering firm Aromin & Sy + Associates, another established company responsible for the structural design of major skyscrapers in the country.

Construction and Project Management services is provided by Asian Technicon Managers & Consultants, Inc., while the general contractor for the project is EEI Corporation, one of the largest construction companies in the country.

Other groups included in the design team are: Asuncion Berenguer Inc. (Interior Design); DL Lagman Engineering (Airconditioning & Ventilation Design); M.A. Alix & Partners (Electrical Design); Figueroa & Associates (Plumbing & Fire Protection Design); Dr. Salvador F. Reyes (Geotechnical & Soils); SMDI Consultants Inc. (Traffic Consultant); DCCD Engineering Corp. (Floor Study Consultant); and Meinhardt Philippines (Elevator Consultant).

== Location ==
The Beacon is located at the corner of Don Chino Roces and Antonio Arnaiz Avenues near the heart of Makati, and is just a few meters away from commercial establishments like Makati Cinema Square and Walter Mart - Makati; Don Bosco Parish and Don Bosco Technical Institute, Makati, and a few blocks away from the Makati Central Business District.

== See also ==
- The Beacon - Arnaiz Tower
- The Beacon - Amorsolo Tower
