= Princesa Tower =

General information
- Status: Proposed
- Type: Observation
- Location: Puerto Princesa, Palawan, Philippines

Height
- Antenna spire: 680 m (2,230 ft)

Design and construction
- Architect: Rollie Rack

The Princesa Tower is a proposed 680 m (2,230 ft) tall observation tower planned to be built in Puerto Princesa, Palawan, Philippines.

== Development ==
Plans to construct the Princesa Tower was first publicized in September 2018 as a project of the Puerto Princesa city government led by Mayor Lucilo Bayron who wanted a landmark for the city which would be known internationally. If built the tower would be among the tallest structures in the world. Bayron said that the tower will be built at no cost to the Puerto Princesa government except for the ₱1 million spent for the creation of the architectural design for the tower. Funds are meant to be derived from crowdsourcing. He has also pointed out that Puerto Princesa is a suitable place for such tall structure since the city is not in an earthquake prone part of the Philippines. Despite skepticism for the feasibility of the tower project, Bayron maintained that in 2019 that he is still pushing for the Princesa Tower's construction saying he had received pledges from 12 companies, both foreign and local, worth ₱27.55 billion for the tower project.

There were separate plan to build a 200 m (660 ft) DNA-like structure which both had retail and observation tower function.

== Facilities ==
As of 2018, Princesa Tower is planned to have a height of 680 m (2,230 ft). Among the features of the structure include a 550 m (1,800 ft) "sky ride" which has a carrying capacity of 76 people and a water curtain with waters falling from the height of 176 m (577 ft) and is intended to be the longest man-made curtain in the world. It is also planned to host restaurant, a leisure area suitable for activities such as zumba, and a glass floor area.

The tower is planned to be built at the Santa Lucia Environmental Estate and was also considered to be built in front of Puerto Princesa's New Green City Hall.
