= Rockwell Center =

- Aerial view of Rockwell Center (2026)

Project
- Opening date: 1998
- Developer: Rockwell Land Corporation
- Architect: Skidmore, Owings & Merrill and Felino Palafox
- Owner: Lopez Holdings
- Website: Rockwell Land Corporation

Physical features
- Major buildings: Power Plant Mall, Nestlé (Philippines) headquarters, Rizal Tower, Luna Gardens, One Rockwell East Tower, One Rockwell West Tower
- Streets: J.P. Rizal Avenue, Estrella Street, Rockwell Drive, Amapola Street, R. Palma Street
- Transport: Express bus services

Location
- Interactive map of Rockwell Center
- Location within Philippines
- Coordinates: 14.5654°N 121.0370°E
- Country: Philippines
- Metropolitan area: Metro Manila
- City: Makati
- Barangay: Poblacion

Rockwell Center is a high-end mixed-use neighborhood in Poblacion and Guadalupe Viejo in Makati, Metro Manila, Philippines, named after James Rockwell, former President of Manila Electric Railroad and Light Company (Meralco). It is a project of Rockwell Land Corporation, which is owned by the Lopez Holdings Corporation. Rockwell Center was first developed in 1998 and is being expanded since 2012. The architectural firm Skidmore, Owings & Merrill (SOM) carried out the design under the direction of former design partner Larry Oltmanns, while Felino Palafox and his company, Palafox Associates, became responsible for the master-planning of the complex. Its centerpiece, the Power Plant Mall, opened on December 26, 2000. Rockwell Center includes office buildings, condominium towers, a professional school and a shopping mall.

== Location and vicinity ==
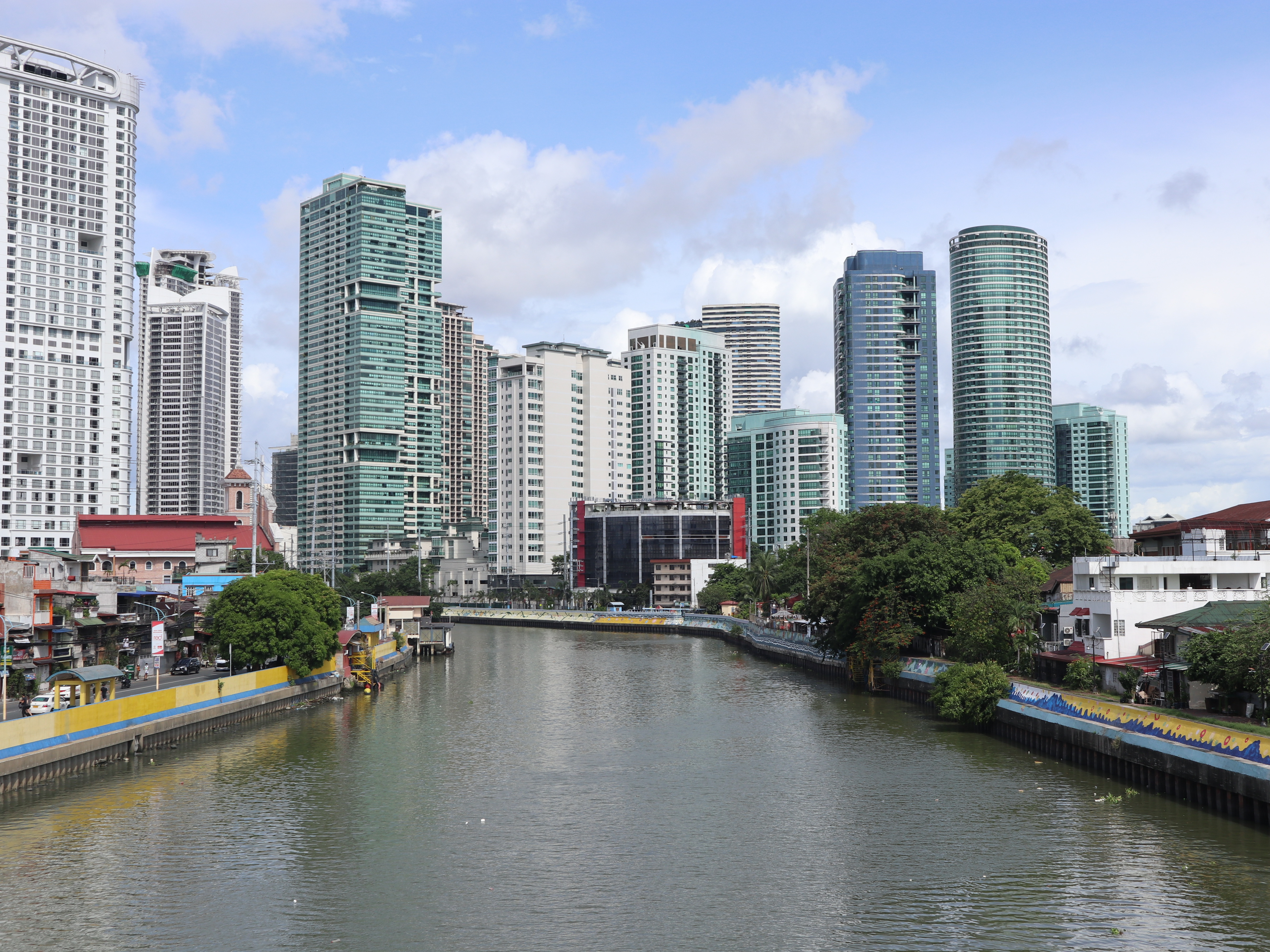
View of Rockwell Center from the Pasig River at day

Rockwell Center sits on a 15.5-hectare (38-acre) lot in Poblacion, Makati previously occupied by a thermal power plant, which was operated by then Lopez-owned Manila Electric Railroad and Light Company until its closure in 1994. The lot is bounded by J.P. Rizal Avenue to the north, where it faces the Pasig River; Estrella Street to the east; Rockwell Drive and Amapola Street to the south; and R. Palma Street to the west.

== Facilities and tenants ==
Rockwell Center is home to the Power Plant Mall, as well as three office buildings, residential condominiums, and the Ateneo Professional Schools, which houses the School of Law and the Graduate School of Business.

=== Office Buildings ===
- Nestlé Center (Nestlé Philippines Inc. headquarters)
- PHINMA Plaza
- 8 Rockwell

=== Residential Condominiums ===
- The Balmori Suites (located on top of Power Plant Mall)
- Joya Lofts and Towers
- Edades Tower and Garden Villas
- Amorsolo Tower
- Rizal Tower
- Luna Gardens
- Hidalgo Place
- One Rockwell
  - One Rockwell West Tower
  - One Rockwell East Tower
- The Manansala
- The Proscenium at Rockwell

==== The Proscenium at Rockwell ====
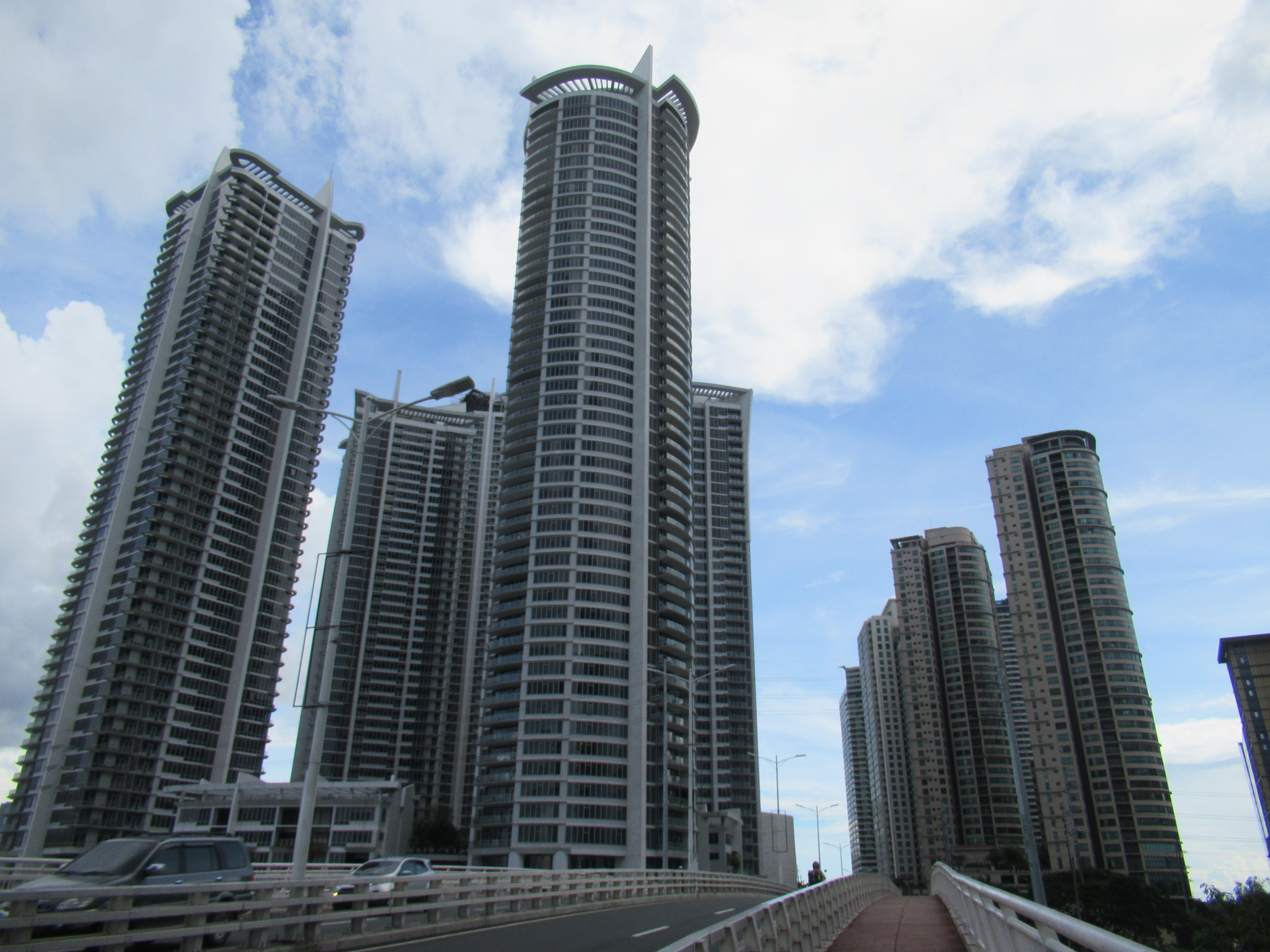
The Proscenium at Rockwell (left) as seen from the Estrella–Pantaleon Bridge.

Marking the expansion of Rockwell Center is The Proscenium at Rockwell, a 3.6 hectares (8.9 acres) mixed-used luxury development standing in the property formerly occupied by the Colgate-Palmolive (Philippines) headquarters across Estrella Street in Guadalupe Viejo, Makati. The complex is designed by world-renowned architect Carlos Ott. The development consists of five residential towers, luxurious retail spaces, an office tower, and a performing arts theater called The Proscenium Theater, featuring limited and spacious units for each floor of the towers. The five residential towers are named the Kirov, Sakura, Lincoln, Lorraine, and the Proscenium Residences.

The development's office tower component, the 1 Proscenium, was opened in 2021. The Proscenium Theater was completed and opened in September 2025.

== See also ==
- ABS-CBN Broadcasting Center
- ELJ Communications Center
- Robinsons Cybergate
- Bonifacio Global City
- Makati Central Business District
- Poblacion, Makati
