= The Beacon – Amorsolo Tower =

Planned skyscraper in the Philippines

The Beacon - Amorsolo Tower
- Interactive map of the The Beacon - Amorsolo Tower area

General information
- Status: open
- Type: Residential Condominium
- Location: Arnaiz Avenue corner Chino Roces Avenue, Makati, Philippines
- Coordinates: 14°33′6.33″N 121°0′53.16″E
- Construction started: January 28, 2008
- Completed: 2016
- Opening: 2016

Technical details
- Floor count: 44

Design and construction
- Architect: ASYA Design
- Developer: Geo Estate Estate Development Corporation, New Pacific Resources Management, Inc.
- Structural engineer: Aromin & Sy + Associates
- Main contractor: EEI Corporation

The Beacon – Amorsolo Tower is a residential condominium skyscraper in Makati, Philippines. It was the last of three towers, to be completed, and part of The Beacon complex. The Beacon was developed by Geo Estate Estate Development Corporation in cooperation with New Pacific Resources Management, Inc. The building was completed and opened to the public in 2016

== The Project Team ==
The Beacon, including Roces Tower, is owned and developed by Geo Estate Development Corporation and New Pacific Resources Management, Inc. It was designed by Arch. Albert S. Yulocal of architectural firm ASYA Design, an established design company who provided design to dozens of well known residential condominiums. Structural design and consultancy was provided by engineering firm Aromin & Sy + Associates, another established company responsible for structural design of major skyscrapers in the country.

Construction and Project Management services is provided by Asian Technicon Managers & Consultants, Inc., while the general contractor for the project is EEI Corporation, one of the largest construction companies in the country.

Other groups included in the design team are: Asuncion Berenguer Inc. (Interior Design); DL Lagman Engineering (Airconditioning & Ventilation Design); M.A. Alix & Partners (Electrical Design); Figueroa & Associates (Plumbing & Fire Protection Design); Dr. Salvador F. Reyes (Geotechnical & Soils); SMDI Consultants Inc. (Traffic Consultant); DCCD Engineering Corp. (Floor Study Consultant); and Meinhardt Philippines (Elevator Consultant).

== Location ==
The Beacon is located at the corner of Don Chino Roces and Antonio Arnaiz Avenues near the heart of Makati, and is just a few meters away from commercial establishments like Makati Cinema Square and Waltermart Makati; Don Bosco Parish and Don Bosco Technical Institute - Makati, fellow residential building, Cityland Pasong Tamo Tower and a few blocks away from the Makati Central Business District.

== See also ==
- The Beacon - Arnaiz Tower
- The Beacon - Roces Tower
