= Del Pilar Street =

Road in Manila, Philippines

Coordinates: 14°34′20″N 120°58′57″E

- M.H. del Pilar Street
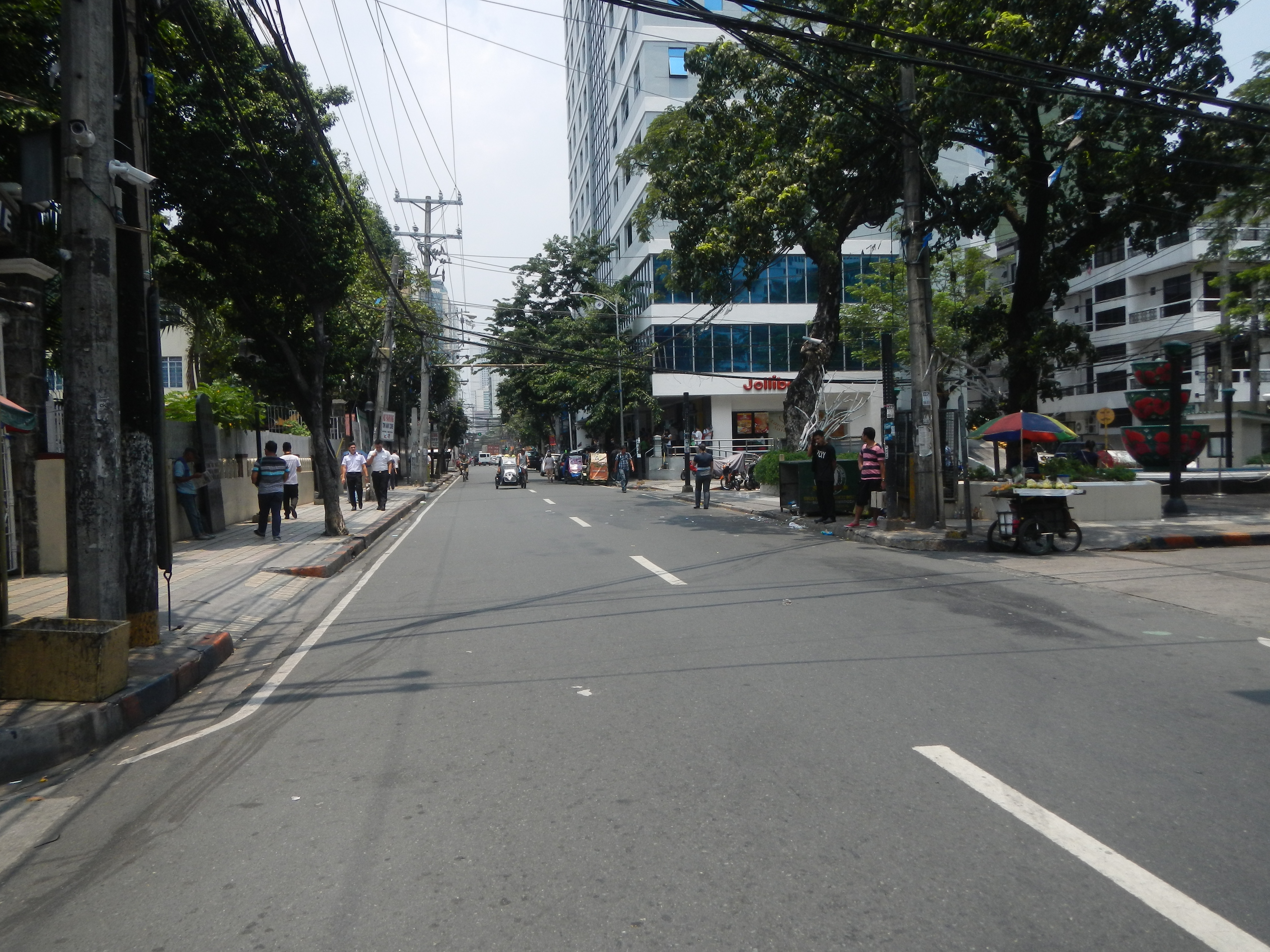
- Del Pilar Street immediately south of Plaza Nuestra Señora de Guía near Ermita Church
- Interactive map of Del Pilar Street
- Former name: Calle Real (until 1921)
- Namesake: Marcelo H. Del Pilar
- Maintained by: Department of Public Works and Highways - South Manila District Engineering Office
- Length: 1.895 km (1.177 mi)
- Location: Manila
- From: N155 (Kalaw Avenue) in Ermita
- Major junctions: N156 (United Nations Avenue); Padre Faura Street; Pedro Gil Street; Remedios Street
- To: N140 (Quirino Avenue) in Malate

Marcelo H. del Pilar Street, also known as M.H. del Pilar Street or simply Del Pilar Street, is a north–south road running for 1.895 kilometers (1.177 mi) connecting Ermita and Malate districts in Manila, Philippines. It is a two-lane street carrying one-way southbound traffic from Kalaw Avenue in Rizal Park to Quirino Avenue across from the Ospital ng Maynila. It was formerly called Calle Real.

== Calle Real ==
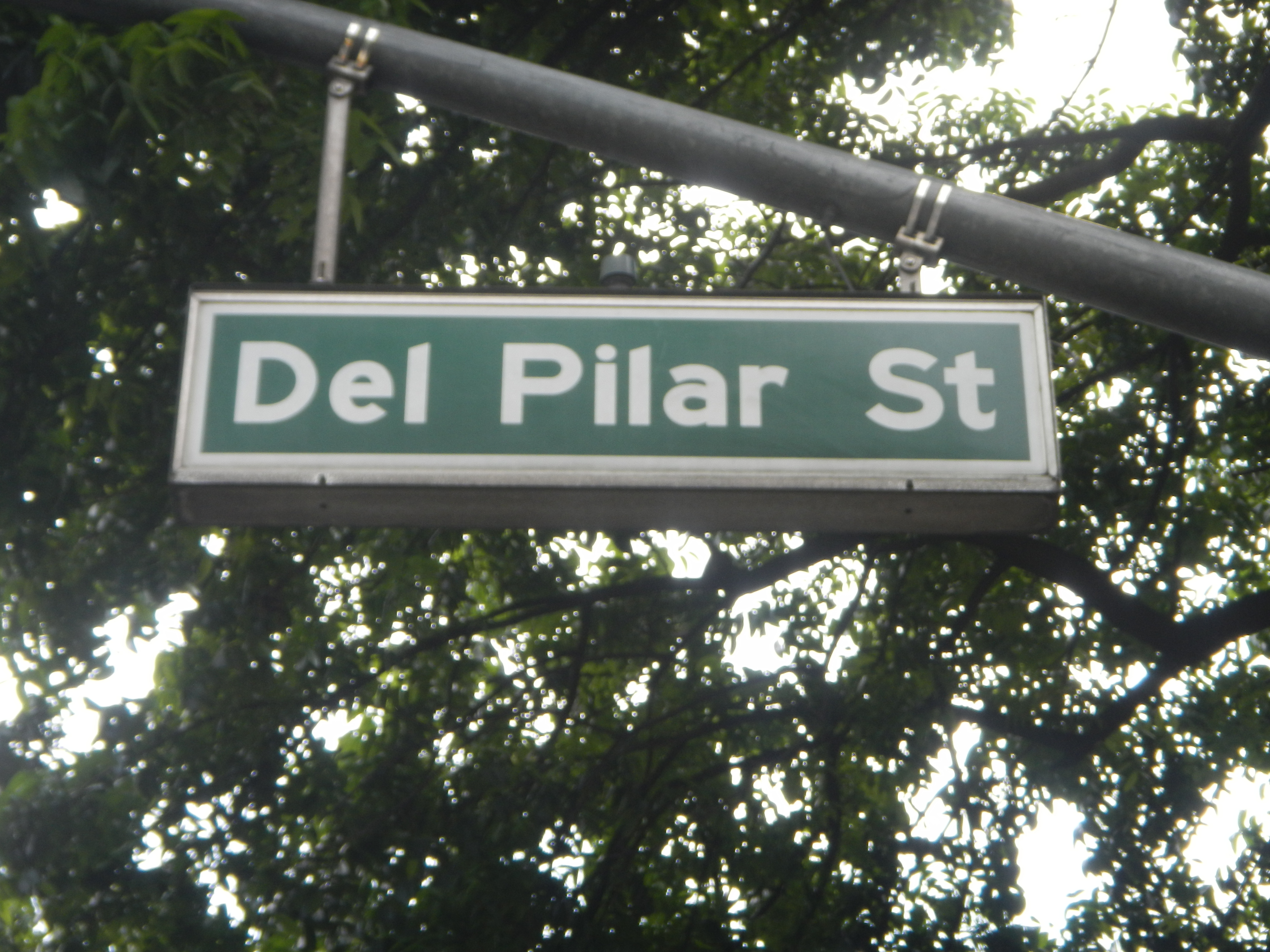
The old illuminated traffic sign of Del Pilar Street sign in Malate, which was replaced by a newer one.

The street marks the original shoreline of Manila Bay during the Spanish colonial period. It was then known as Calle Real (Spanish for "royal street") and was the national road linking Manila with the southern provinces. The old coastal highway ran from Ermita to Muntinlupa, passing through Pasay (where it is now known as F.B. Harrison Street), Parañaque (now known as Elpidio Quirino Avenue), and Las Piñas (now known as Diego Cera Avenue and Alabang–Zapote Road).

The current shoreline is about 180 meters (590 ft) west of Roxas Boulevard (formerly Dewey Boulevard), reclaimed in the early 1900s during the American colonial period. Like most other streets in Manila, it was renamed in 1921 after a Filipino writer and patriot, Marcelo Hilario del Pilar. It was also one of the right-of-way alignments of tranvía that existed until 1945.

== Intersections ==
The entire route is located in Manila.

km	mi	Destinations	Notes
		N140 (Quirino Avenue); C-2	Traffic light intersection, southern terminus.
		Cortabitarte Street	Southbound entrance only
		Aldecoa Street	
		Aguida Street	
		San Andres Street	Traffic light intersection
		Remedios Street	Traffic light intersection
		Quintos Street	Traffic light intersection
		Pedro Gil Street	Traffic light intersection, one-way road towards Taft Avenue
		Santa Monica Street	One-way exit
		Padre Faura Street	Traffic light intersection
		Arquiza Street	
		United Nations Avenue	Traffic light intersection
		N155 (Kalaw Avenue)	Traffic light intersection, northern terminus.
1.000 mi = 1.609 km; 1.000 km = 0.621 mi: Concurrency terminus; Incomplete access

== Landmarks ==
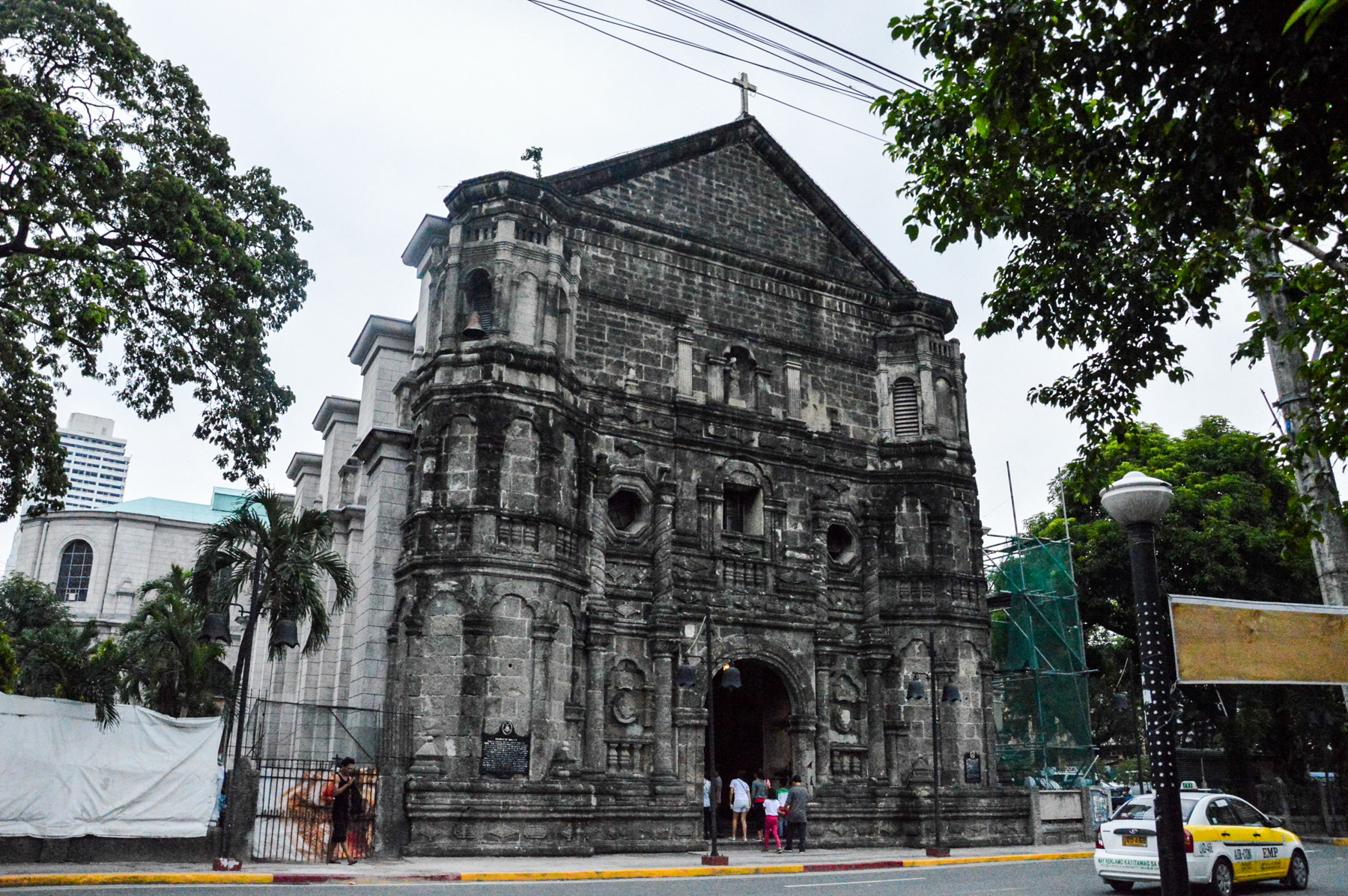
Malate Church on Del Pilar Street

Notable sites currently located on Del Pilar Street include the Ermita Church, LandBank Plaza, the Malate Church, and Gaiety Theater, as well as several hotel buildings, such as the New World Manila Bay Hotel (formerly Hyatt Hotel & Casino) located at the intersection of Pedro Gil Street and Diamond Hotel.

This is ordered from north to south:

- Rizal Park visitor center
- Ermita Church
- Gaiety Theater
- New World Manila Bay Hotel
- Diamond Hotel
- Land Bank of the Philippines main office
- Malate Church
- Ospital ng Maynila Medical Center

== See also ==
- List of renamed streets in Manila
