= United Nations Avenue =

Avenue in Manila, Philippines

Coordinates: 14°34′56″N 120°59′5″E

- U.N. Avenue
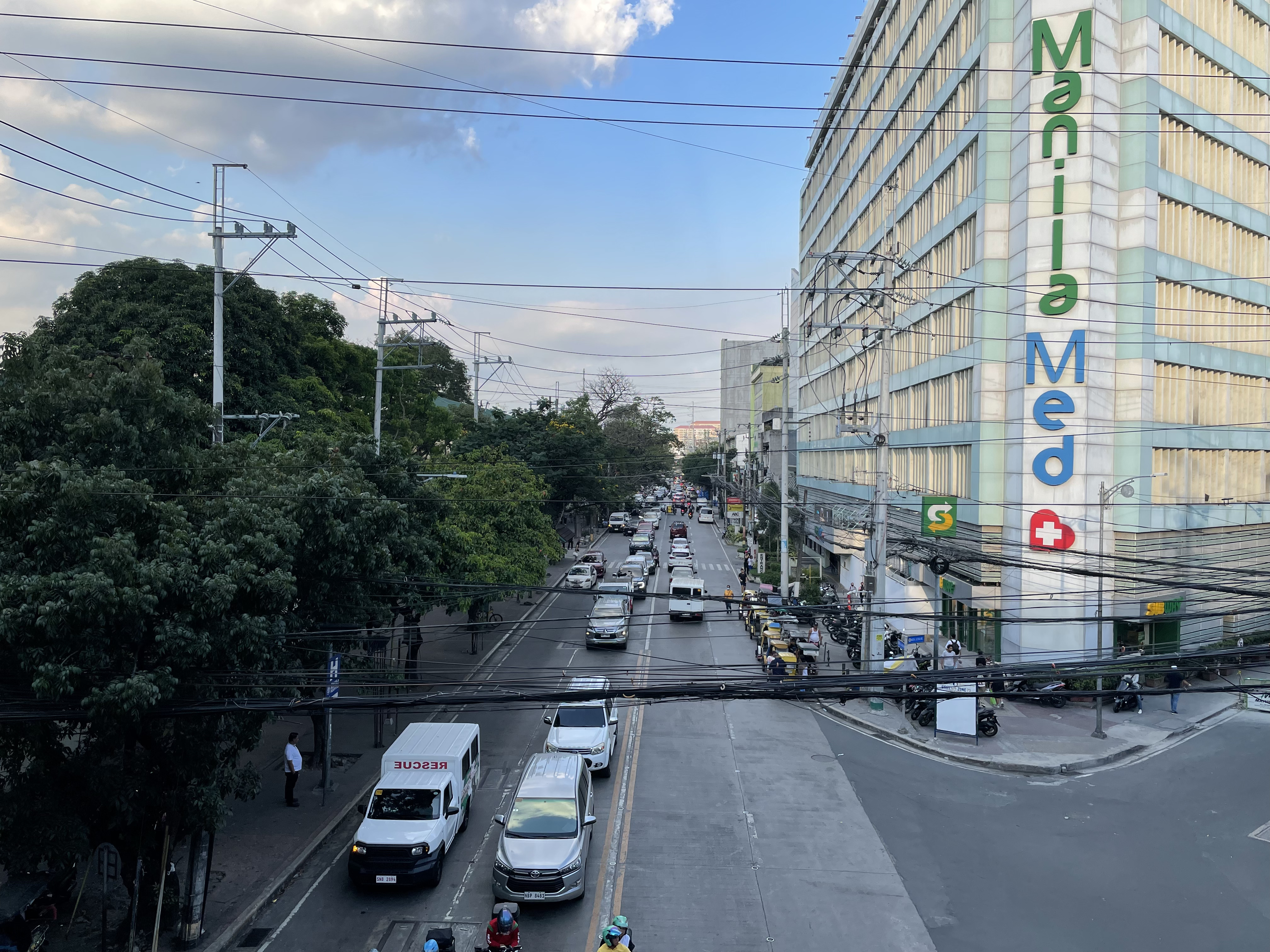
- U.N. Avenue eastbound from Taft Avenue
- Interactive map of United Nations Avenue
- Former name: Isaac Peral Street (until 1962)
- Part of: N156
- Namesake: United Nations; Isaac Peral (formerly)
- Maintained by: Department of Public Works and Highways - South Manila District Engineering Office and Metropolitan Manila Development Authority
- Length: 1.9 km (1.2 mi)
- Location: Manila
- East end: N156 (Quirino Avenue Extension) / Paz Mendoza Guazon Street / Cristobal Street in Paco
- Major junctions: N182 (Romualdez Street); N181 (San Marcelino Street); N170 (Taft Avenue)
- West end: AH26 (Roxas Boulevard) in Ermita

United Nations Avenue (also known as U.N. Avenue and formerly known as Isaac Peral Street) is a major thoroughfare in Manila, Philippines. A commercial, residential and industrial artery, it runs east–west near the city center, linking Ermita and Rizal Park with the eastern districts. It is home to the World Health Organization Western Pacific headquarters.

U.N. Avenue begins at a fork in Quirino Avenue Extension, Paz Mendoza Guazon Street, and Cristobal Street, just west of Pandacan. It continues through the area of Tanque and Isla de Provisor in the northern Paco district, passing several rows of warehouses and a few institutional buildings. West of Taft Avenue lies the busy Ermita district, with a mix of hotels like Manila Prince Hotel, and Manila Pearl Hotel; government and private offices such as PPL Building, Philtrust Bank Main Office, Philippine Insurance Commission, National Archives of the Philippines, and National Bureau of Investigation; College/Universities like Adamson University, Emillio Aguinaldo College, Technological University of the Philippines, and Sta. Isabel College; Commercial buildings like Times Plaza and U.N. Square; and hospital buildings like Manila Med, and Manila Doctors Hospital. Roxas Boulevard lies at its western terminus, with the U.S. Embassy in Manila as the terminating vista.

The avenue is served by the United Nations LRT station.

== History ==
United Nations Avenue was previously known as Isaac Peral Street, after the Spanish engineer who designed the world's first fully capable military submarine in the late 19th century. Originally a short street in Ermita, it was later extended towards Paco, linking it to what was then called Calle Canonigo, which later became part of the avenue that ended at the present-day Tanque Street. It was previously planned to reach as far as Pandacan at the east; however, it only reached up to its present-day terminus in Paco.

On November 15, 1962, the street was renamed United Nations Avenue upon the approval of Ordinance No. 4665 by Manila Mayor Antonio Villegas. The ordinance was previously enacted by the Manila Municipal Board on October 30, 1962, to honor the United Nations (UN) six days after its 17th anniversary. The renaming was also done in recognition of the World Health Organization, a UN agency, whose building was built in 1959 in the former University of the Philippines property located at the southwest corner with Taft Avenue. The avenue was also the site of the first Hilton Hotel in the Philippines, which opened in 1960. This hotel is now Waterfront Manila Hotel and Casino.

== Intersections ==
The entire route is located in Manila.

km	mi	Destinations	Notes
		AH26 (Roxas Boulevard)	Southern terminus. Traffic light intersection.
		Alhambra Street	
		Guerrero Street	
		Del Pilar Street	Traffic light intersection. One-way road towards Malate.
		Cortada Street	
		Mabini Street	Traffic light intersection. One-way road towards National Library of the Philippines and Kalaw Avenue.
		Bocobo Street	Unsignalized intersection. One-way road towards Padre Faura Street.
		Maria Orosa Street	Traffic light intersection. One-way road towards Rizal Park and Intramuros.
		N170 (Taft Avenue)	Traffic light intersection, no left turn on both sides.
		General Luna Street	Northbound exit only, one-way road towards Paco Park.
		N181 (San Marcelino Street)	Traffic light intersection. One-way road towards Quirino Avenue.
		Romualdez Street	Traffic light intersection. One-way road towards Ayala Boulevard, no left turn allowed on both sides.
		Perez Street	
		Correa Street / M. Gandhi Street	Unsignalized intersection. Access to the Manila Hindu Temple and Pope Pius XII Catholic Center.
		Tanque Street	
		Cristobal Street / N156 (Quirino Avenue Extension)	Traffic light intersection. Northern terminus, continues to Pandacan as Paz Mendoza Guazon Avenue.
1.000 mi = 1.609 km; 1.000 km = 0.621 mi: Incomplete access

== Points of interest ==
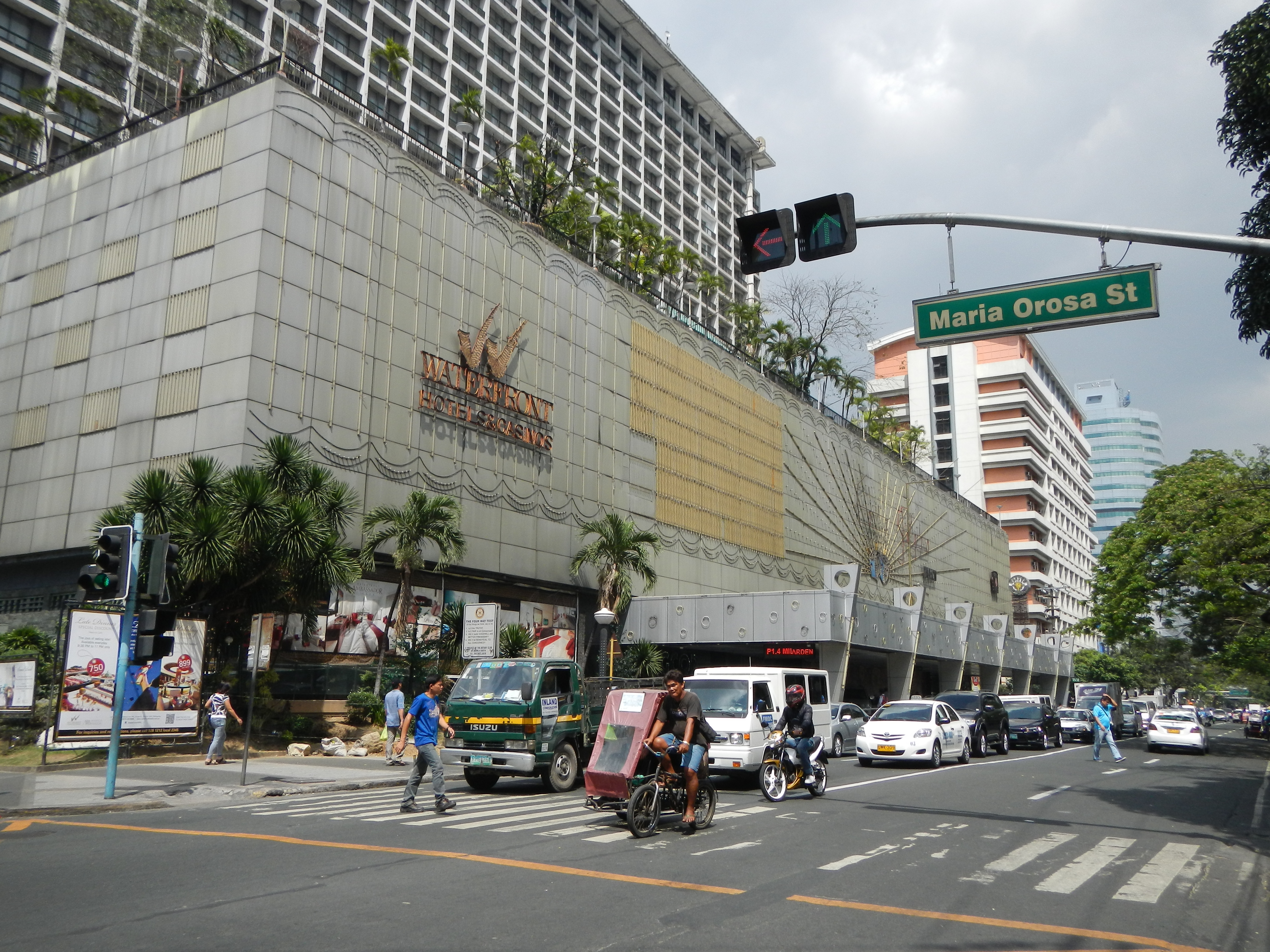
The Waterfront Manila Pavilion Hotel and Casino at the junction with Maria Orosa Street

This is ordered from west (Roxas Boulevard) to east (Paz Mendoza Guazon Avenue/President Quirino Avenue Extension/Cristobal Street):

- Bayview Park Hotel Manila
- Manila Doctors Hospital
- National Bureau of Investigation (old headquarters)
- World Health Organization Western Pacific Regional Office
- Times Plaza
- Waterfront Manila Hotel and Casino (closed since the 2018 fire)
- United Nations station
- Araullo High School
- Plaza Rueda
- ManilaMed (formerly Medical Center Manila)
- Philippine Bible Society
- Manila Police District headquarters
- UN Square
- Insurance Commission
- Philtrust Bank Building
- Santa Maria Goretti Parish
- Pope Pius XII Catholic Center
- Asilo de San Vicente de Paul
- Unilever Philippines (old office)
- UN Avenue Bridge (Estero de Paco)
- Khalsa Diwan Temple
