= Quirino Avenue =

Major street in Manila, Philippines

Coordinates: 14°34′33″N 120°59′46″E

C-2
- President Elpidio Quirino Avenue; Pres. Quirino Avenue
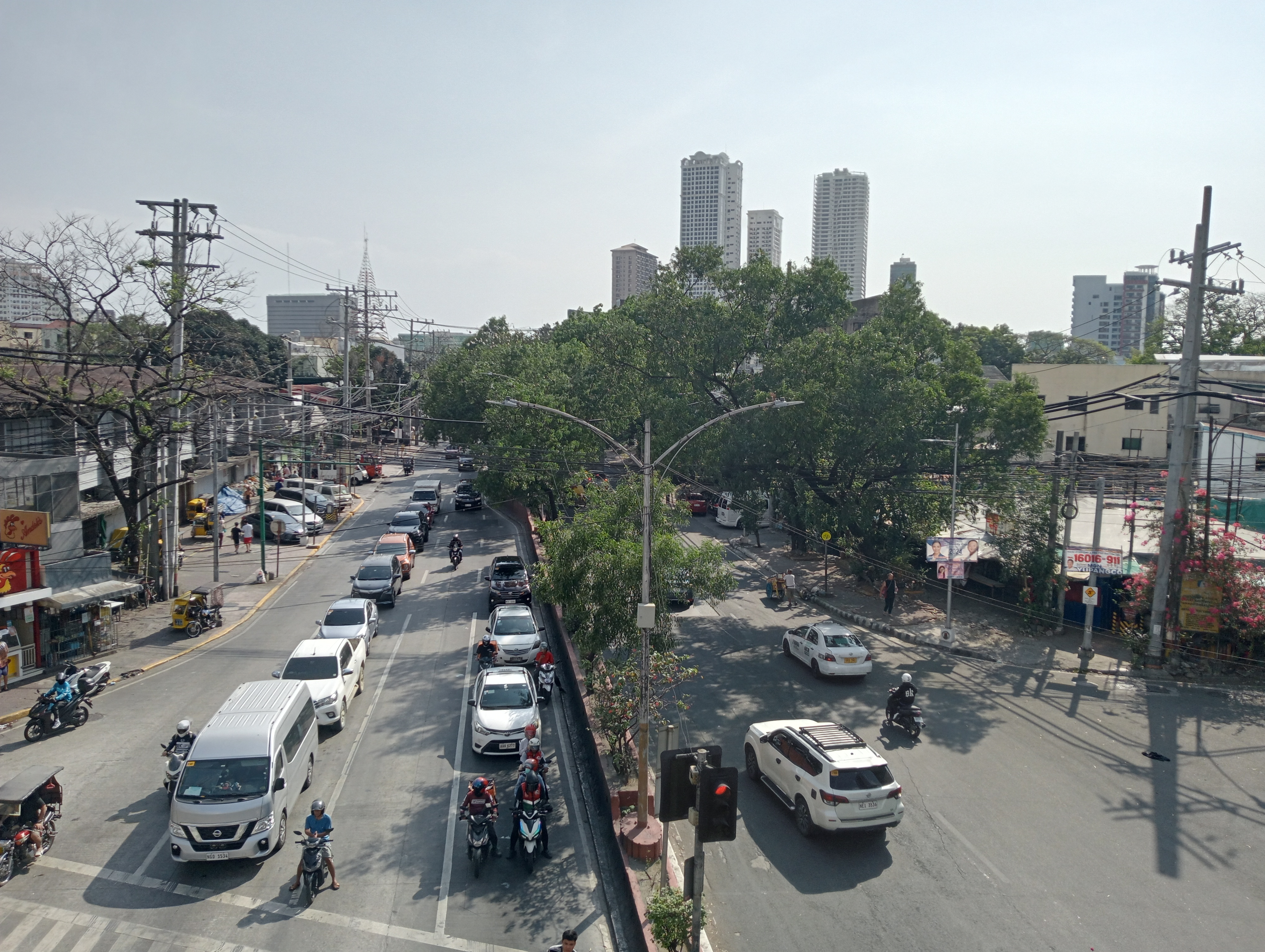
- Looking west towards Malate from Quirino LRT Station
- Interactive map of Quirino Avenue
- Former names: Dewey Boulevard; Harrison Boulevard (until 1971); Koa Boulevard
- Namesake: Elpidio Quirino
- Maintained by: Department of Public Works and Highways - South Manila District Engineering Office and Metropolitan Manila Development Authority
- Length: 3.6 km (2.2 mi); 1 km round
- Component highways: C-2 C-2; N140
- Location: Manila
- North end: Paz Mendoza Guazon Street & Jesus Street in Paco
- Major junctions: N141 (Tomas Claudio Street); N156 (Plaza Dilao Road); N145 (Osmeña Highway); N181 (San Marcelino Street); N170 (Taft Avenue)
- South end: AH26 (Roxas Boulevard) in Malate

President Elpidio Quirino Avenue, more commonly known as Quirino Avenue, is a 6-10 lane divided highway in Manila, Philippines. It runs for 3.6 kilometers (2.2 mi) in a northeast–southwest direction from Nagtahan Bridge (now Mabini Bridge) across Santa Mesa in the north to Roxas Boulevard in Malate in the south. It passes through the Paco and Pandacan districts and serves as a truck route between the Port Area and the South Luzon Expressway. North of Nagtahan Bridge, the road continues as Nagtahan Street. It is designated as part of Circumferential Road 2. It is named after Elpidio Quirino, the sixth President of the Philippines.

== Route description ==
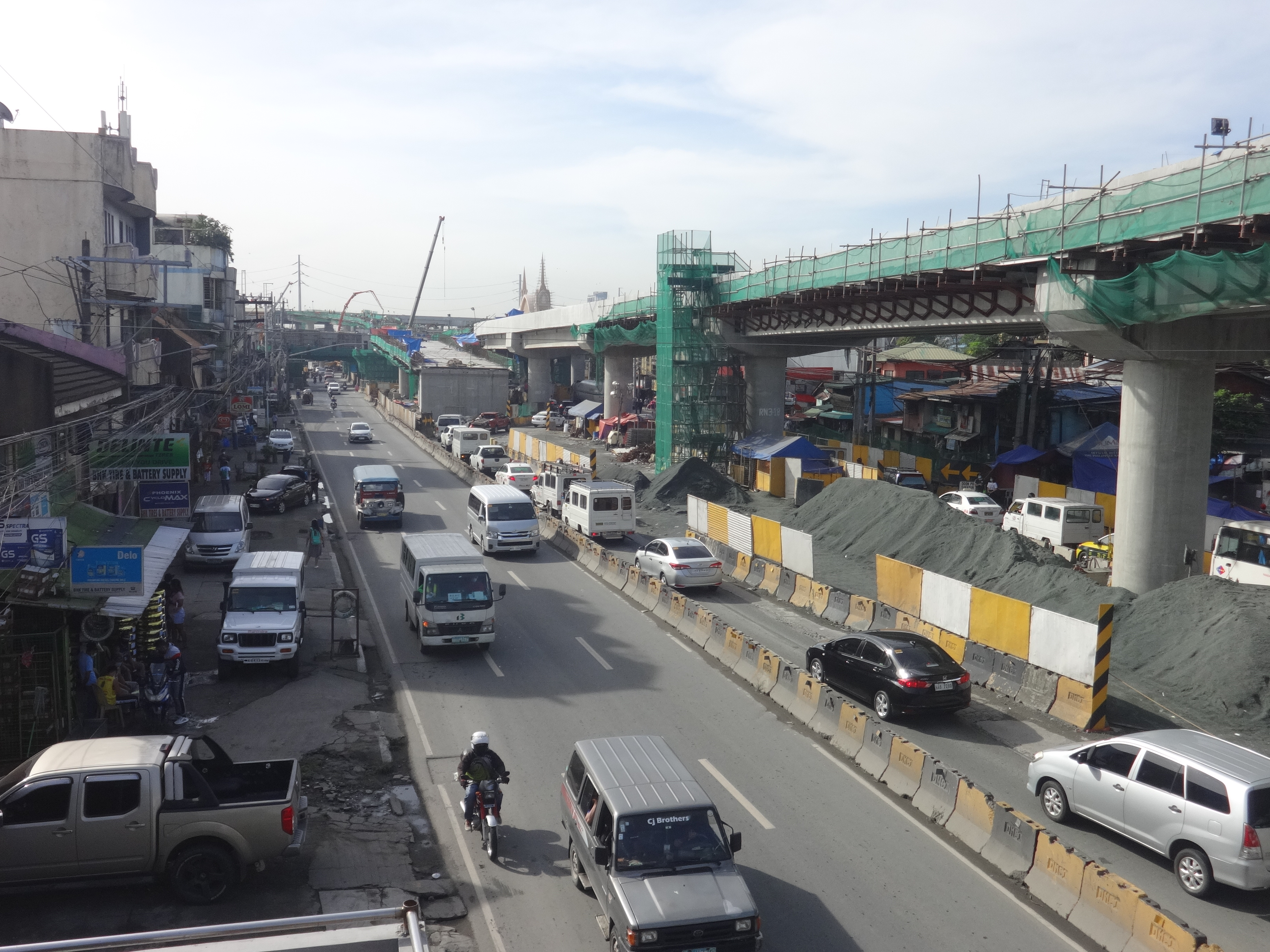
Quirino Avenue and the Nagtahan ramp of Skyway

The northern end of Quirino Avenue is at the intersection of Paz Mendoza Guazon (Otis) and Jesus Streets in Paco, at the foot of the Nagtahan Bridge, as a continuation of Nagtahan Street. Heading south, it enters Pandacan, moving past primarily residential areas on both sides, meeting the Nagtahan ramps to and from Skyway Stage 3, and passing by Zamora Market on the western side. At the former Plaza Azul, the avenue then curves southwest to follow the alignment of the Philippine National Railways line, which merges with traffic from Tomas Claudio Street (Paco–Santa Mesa Road).

South of the junction with Tomas Claudio, the avenue re-enters the district of Paco, where the old Paco station and Plaza Dilao are located. Southbound traffic is currently carried by Plaza Dilao Road, a loop road around Plaza Dilao just off the main highway, while northbound traffic remains on Quirino. Also located along this stretch are the Plaza Dilao on-ramp to Skyway, the Philippine Columbian Association complex on Plaza Dilao, and the new Paco station near the intersection with Pedro Gil Street. It follows a straight path south towards the border with Malate and is joined by Osmeña Highway.

The Malate section of Quirino Avenue is primarily residential and commercial. The Singalong area, where the Quirino on- and off-ramps of Skyway, lies directly south of the Osmeña Highway junction just before it intersects with Taft Avenue, where the elevated LRT Line 1 Quirino station is located. Past Taft Avenue, Quirino Avenue provides access to the tourism center of Malate. It curves westwards past Adriatico Street until it meets its southern terminus at Roxas Boulevard, overlooking Manila Bay. A monument of Elpidio Quirino, after whom the avenue is named, is also located at the intersection.

=== Quirino Avenue Extension ===
Quirino Avenue Extension

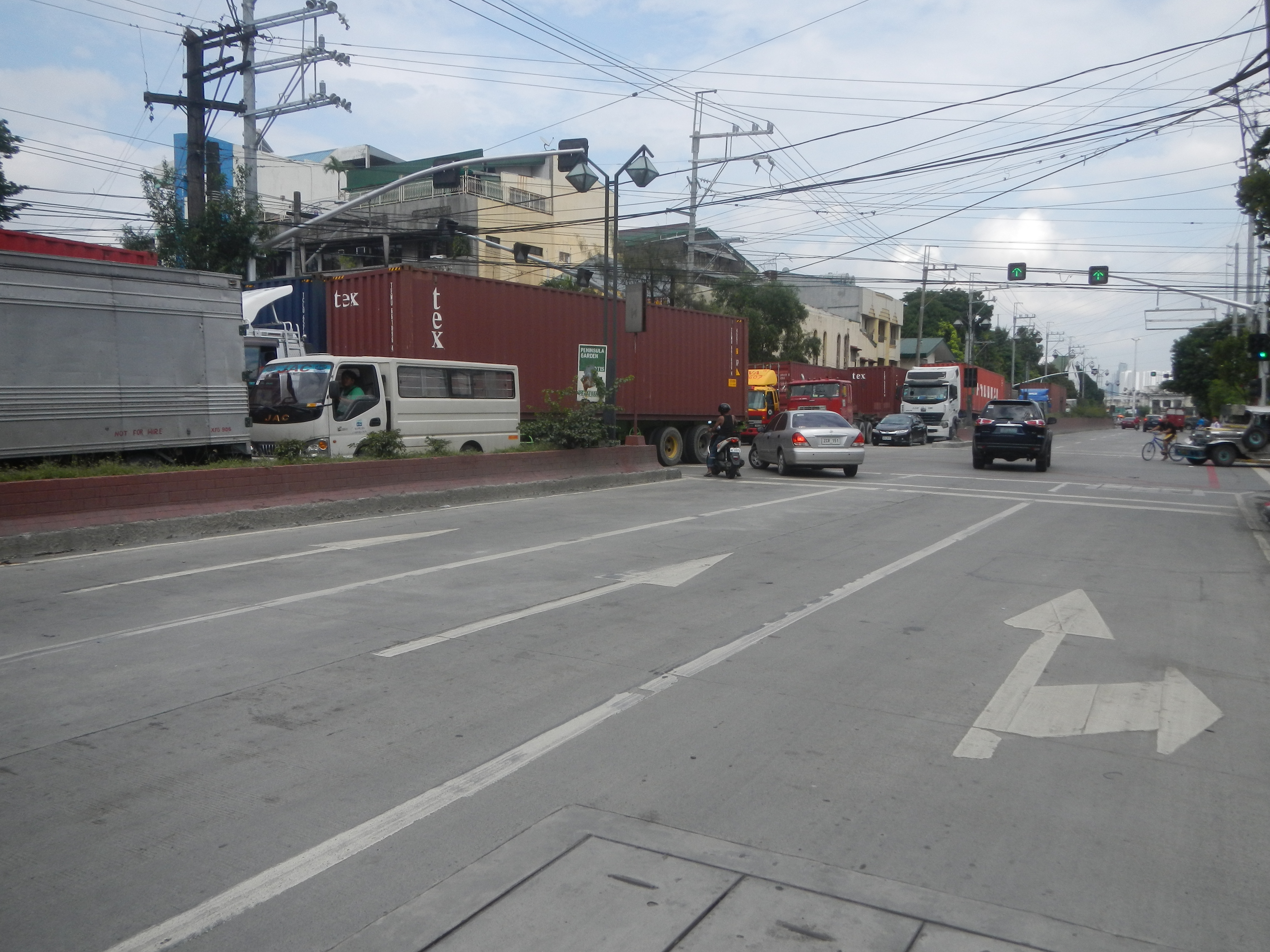
- Quirino Avenue Extension looking south towards Plaza Dilao
- Interactive map of Quirino Avenue Extension
- Former name: Calle Canonigo (until 1971)
- Namesake: Elpidio Quirino
- Length: 0.75 km (0.47 mi); Approximate length
- Location: Paco, Manila
- North end: N156 (United Nations Avenue) / Paz Mendoza Guazon Street / Cristobal Street
- South end: N156 (Plaza Dilao Road)

Quirino Avenue extends to the industrial area of Paco (Otis) and United Nations Avenue from Plaza Dilao Road. Formerly known as Calle Canonigo, this is the main truck route going in and out of the Port Area from Osmeña Highway.

== History ==
=== Early history ===
Quirino Avenue's origin could be traced back to two distinct roads developed during the Spanish and American colonial eras, namely: Canonigo Street (previously Calle Canonigo) and Harrison Boulevard (previously part of Dewey Boulevard). The avenue also incorporated other historic roads. The path toward the Nagtahan Bridge were narrow streets called Calle Luengo and Consuelo Street in Pandacan, while the coastal edge in southern Malate was connected to Cavite Boulevard (now Roxas Boulevard) via Calle Cortabitarte, which survives today as a frontage road across from the Ospital ng Maynila Medical Center.

Calle Canonigo, which presently forms the avenue's extension at the east, dates back to the early 19th century under Spanish colonial rule when it was first laid out in Paco to connect Calle Isaac Peral (now United Nations Avenue) and Plaza Dilao. On the other hand, Harrison Boulevard was built in the 20th century during the American colonial period to form the avenue's western section, spanning from Plaza Dilao to the Manila Bay coastline. This newer segment initially served as an extension of Dewey Boulevard (now Roxas Boulevard) before receiving its distinct name. Plaza Dilao, which served as a major junction between Harrison and Canonigo, evolved into an important transportation hub following the opening of the Paco railway station in 1915. During the Japanese occupation in World War II, Harrison Boulevard was briefly renamed Koa Boulevard by virtue of Executive Order No. 41 issued in 1942.

=== Unification as Quirino Avenue ===
Canonigo Street and Harrison Boulevard were later combined and renamed as President Quirino Avenue, in honor of the sixth Philippine President Elpidio Quirino, by virtue of Ordinance No. 7098, approved by Manila Mayor Antonio Villegas on December 16, 1971. The section of the avenue between Plaza Dilao in Paco and Jesus Street in Pandacan was later built over the former Zamora and Consuelo Streets. This construction split the original Zamora Street into West and East Zamora Streets, while the section formerly known as Canonigo Street became the Quirino Avenue Extension.

The Metro Manila Skyway Stage 3, including its on- and off-ramps, was constructed above the avenue's section between San Marcelino Street and P. Quirino Bridge 3 from 2014 until Skyway's Nagtahan ramp opened in 2021.

==== 2026 tree cutting ====
In May 2026, the felling of approximately 617 trees along Quirino Avenue's section west of the Metro Manila Skyway's Quirino ramp for the elevated Southern Access Link Expressway (SALEx) project of the San Miguel Corporation and the Department of Public Works and Highways (DPWH) drew heavy criticism. While environmental and heritage advocacy groups strongly condemned the loss of Manila's dwindling urban green canopy, the Department of Environment and Natural Resources (DENR) and project proponents defended the action, citing valid permits and a commitment to plant 50,700 replacement seedlings. On May 27, 2026, the tree cutting was halted by the DENR.

== Landmarks ==
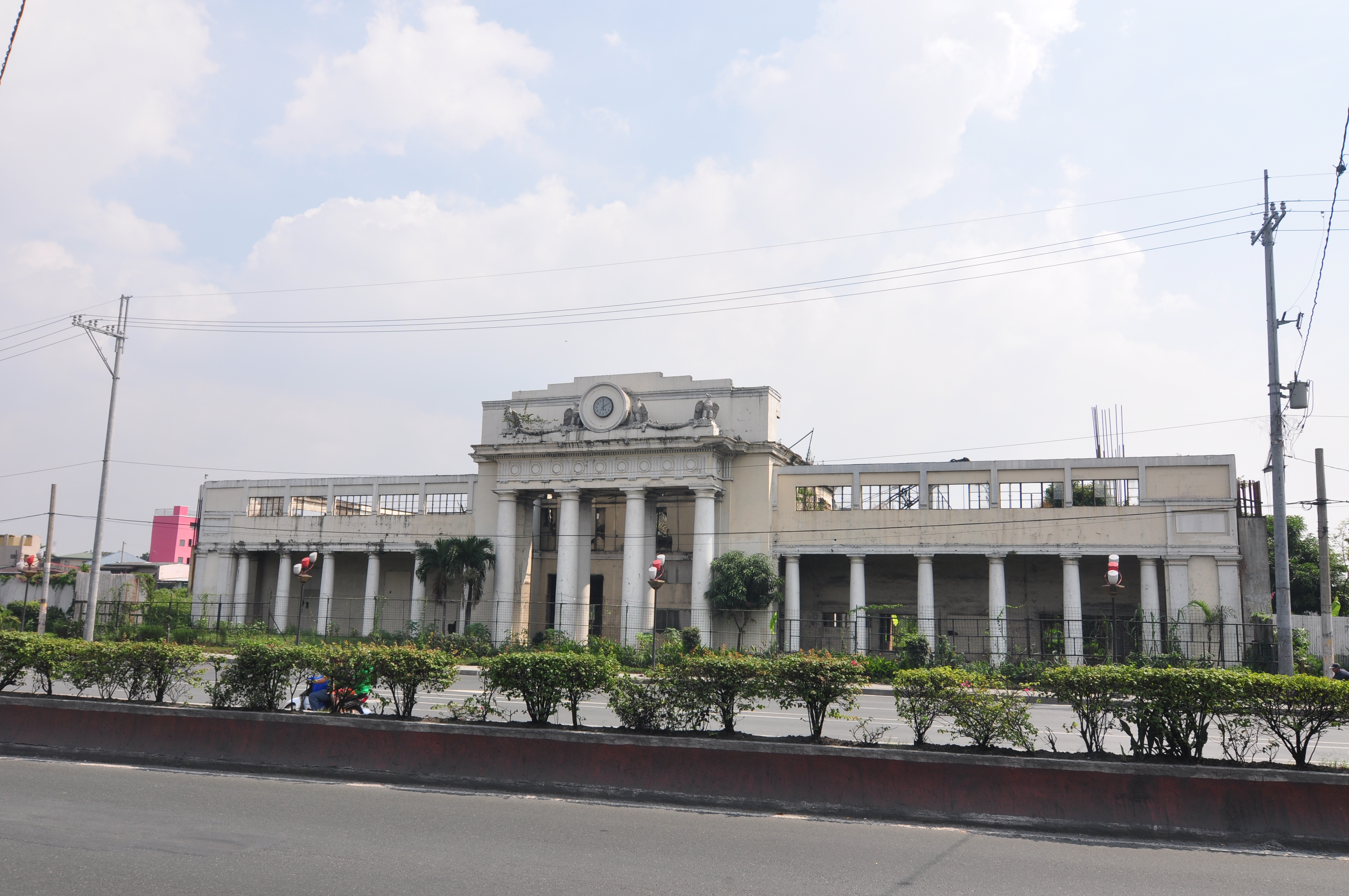
Old Paco station on Quirino Avenue

- Aloha Hotel
- Asociacion de Damas de Filipinas
- Bureau of Plant Industry
- Jacinto Zamora Elementary School
- Manila Zoo
- Old Paco station
- Ospital ng Maynila Medical Center
- Malacañang Hospital
- Manuel Roxas High School
- Paraiso ng Batang Maynila Park
- Philippine Columbian Association
- Plaza Dilao
- President Elpidio Quirino Monument
- Saint Peter the Apostle School
- San Andres Market
- Zamora Market

== Intersections ==
=== Quirino Avenue ===
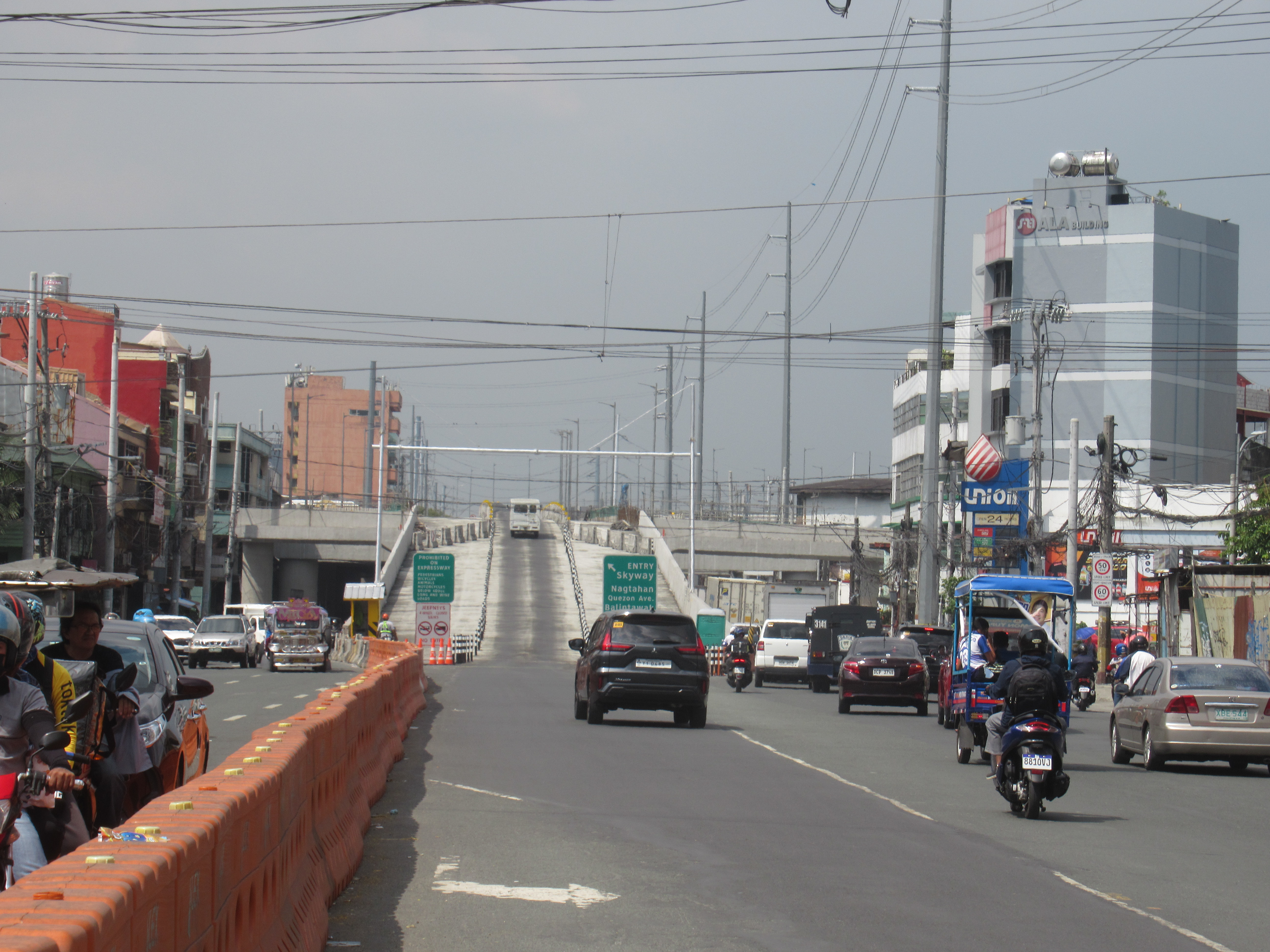
Skyway's Quirino on- and off-ramp on Quirino Avenue

The entire route is located in Manila. Intersections are numbered by kilometer post, with Rizal Park, also in Manila, designated as kilometer 0.

km	mi	Destinations	Notes
		N140 (Nagtahan Bridge), Paz Mendoza Guazon Street, Jesus Street	Northern terminus; continues north as Nagtahan Bridge
		Mendoza Guazon Street	Traffic Light intersection
5.700	3.542	P. Quirino Bridge 3 over Estero de Pandacan	
		Skyway	Skyway-Nagtahan Exit; northbound entrance from Skyway Stage 3
		East Zamora Street	Northbound entrance only
		Paradise Street	Northbound only
		Skyway	Skyway-Nagtahan Exit; southbound exit to Skyway Stage 3 northbound
		Obisis Street	Southbound only
		Carlos Street Extension	Northbound only
		West Zamora Street	Former traffic light intersection
		San Jose Street	Northbound only
		E. Carlos Street	Northbound only
		N141 (Tomas Claudio Street)	Northbound only
4.450	2.765	P. Quirino Bridge 2 over Estero de Pandacan	
		Skyway	Skyway-Plaza Dilao Exit; southbound exit
		N156 (Plaza Dilao Road)	Northbound exit, southbound exit, and southbound entrance only
		Santo Sepulcro Street	Southbound only.
		Figueroa Street	One-way; no entry from Quirino Avenue
		Pedro Gil Street	Traffic light intersection; no right turn allowed from southbound and no left turn allowed from northbound
		Sagat Street	One-way; southbound only
		N145 (Osmeña Highway)	Traffic light intersection.
		Union Street, Lanuza Street	Southbound only; Union Street is one-way
		Paz Street	Southbound only
3.850	2.392	P. Quirino Bridge 1 over Estero de Paco	
		Anak Bayan Street, Julio Nakpil Street, Mataas na Lupa Street	Unsignalized intersections.
		Campillo Street	Northbound only
		Angel Linao Street	Unsignalized intersection; one-way road and former traffic light intersection
		Pintong Bato Street	Southbound only
		Smith Street	Northbound only
		Singalong Street	One-way road and former traffic light intersection; no access to opposite direction.
		San Bartolome Street	Limited access road; southbound only
		Skyway	Skyway-Quirino Exit; northbound exit and southbound entrance
		F. Benitez Street	One-way road; no access to opposite direction
		Modesto Street	No access to opposite directions
		N181 (San Marcelino Street)	Traffic light intersection; one-way road
		San Pascual Street, Agoncillo Street	No access to opposite directions
		San Antonio Street	Northbound only
		Leon Guinto Street	Traffic light intersection
		San Andres Street	One-way road going in opposite directions; bisected by Taft Avenue
		N170 (Taft Avenue)	Traffic light intersection
		Fidel A. Reyes Street, Maginhawa Street, Bagong Lipunan Street	Northbound only
		Leveriza Street	Traffic light intersection
		Camia Street, Asuncion Street	Northbound only
		Adriatico Street	Traffic light intersection; northern segment is one-way towards Manila Zoological and Botanical Garden
		Madre Ignacia Street	Unsignaled intersection
		Mabini Street	Traffic light intersection; northern segment is one-way only
		Del Pilar Street	Traffic light intersection; one-way entrance only
		AH26 (Roxas Boulevard)	Southern terminus
1.000 mi = 1.609 km; 1.000 km = 0.621 mi: Incomplete access

=== Quirino Avenue Extension ===
The entire route is located in Manila.

km	mi	Destinations	Notes
		N156 (Plaza Dilao Road)	Southern terminus
		San Antonio Street	One-way entrance only
		San Gregorio Street	Southbound only
		Peñafrancia Street, Zamora Street	Traffic light intersection
		Peñafrancia Extension	Northbound only
		Zulueta Street	Southbound only
		Paz Street	Unsignalled intersection
		Cristobal Street	Southbound entrance only
		N156 (United Nations Avenue), Paz Mendoza Guazon Street	Northern terminus; traffic light intersection
1.000 mi = 1.609 km; 1.000 km = 0.621 mi: Incomplete access

== See also ==
- Major roads in Manila
