= Pedro Gil station =

Train station in Manila, Philippines

Coordinates: 14°34′35.87″N 120°59′16.77″E

Pedro Gil	GL15
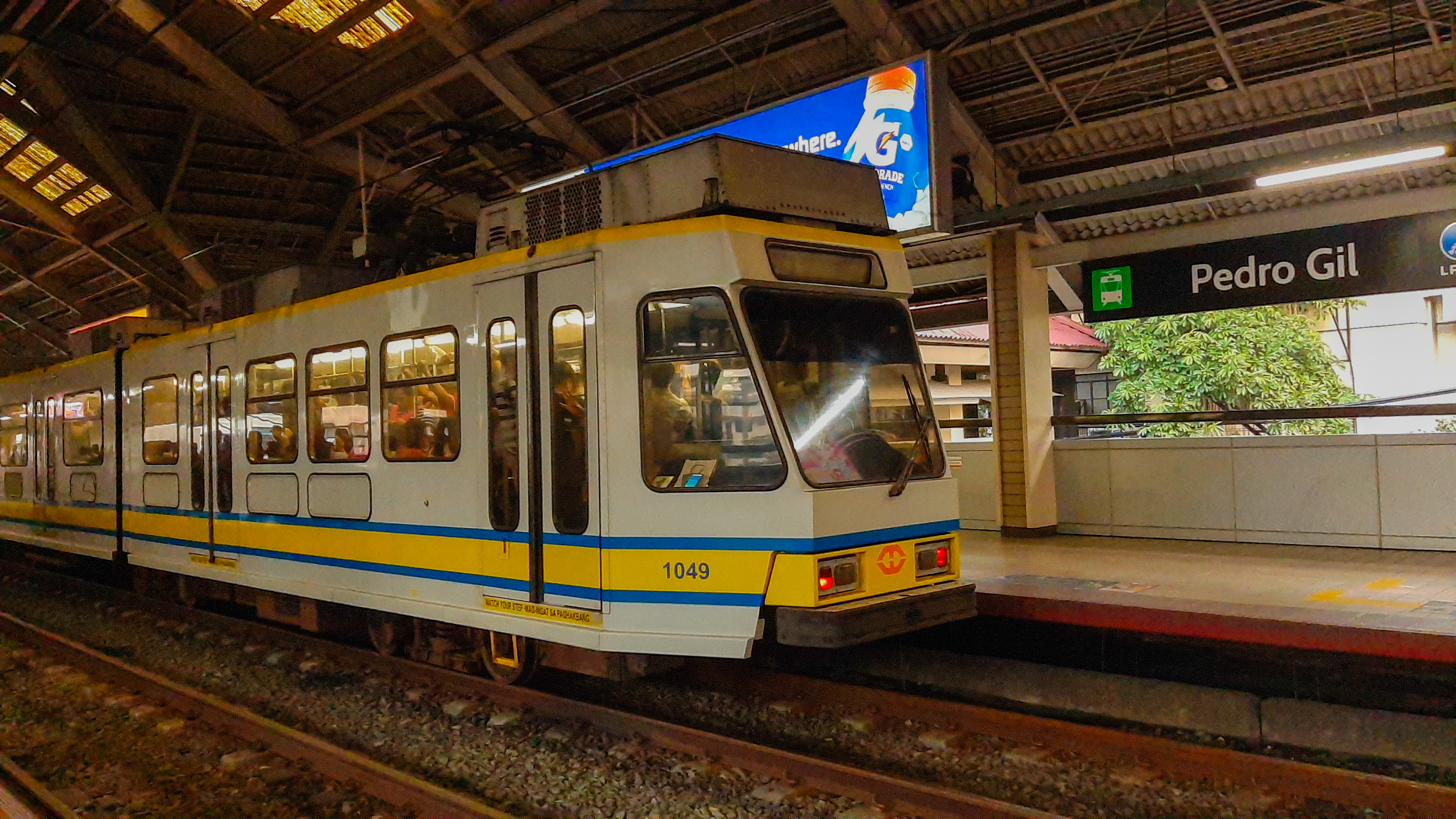

General information
- Other names: Herran
- Location: Taft Avenue, Ermita; Manila, Metro Manila, Philippines
- Owner: Department of Transportation; Light Rail Manila Corporation
- Line: LRT Line 1
- Platforms: 2 (2 side)
- Tracks: 2

Construction
- Structure type: Elevated

History
- Opened: December 1, 1984; 41 years ago

Services
Preceding station	Manila LRT	Following station
United Nations towards Fernando Poe Jr.	LRT Line 1	Quirino towards Dr. Santos
Track layout
Location
- Location within Manila Location within Metro Manila Location within Luzon Location within Philippines

Pedro Gil station is an elevated Light Rail Transit (LRT) station located on the LRT Line 1 (LRT-1) system in Ermita District, City of Manila, Philippines. It is situated at the corner of Taft Avenue and Pedro Gil Street. The station takes its name from Pedro Gil Street, which used to be called Herran Street.

Pedro Gil station is the twelfth station for trains headed to Fernando Poe Jr., and the fourteenth station for trains headed to Dr. Santos.

== History ==
Pedro Gil station was opened to the public on December 1, 1984, as part of LRT's inaugural southern section, known as the Taft Line.

== Nearby landmarks ==
Landmarks near the station include the Philippine General Hospital, the University of the Philippines Manila, Philippine Christian University, Philippine Women's University, Robinsons Manila, and St. Paul University Manila.

== Transportation links ==
Pedro Gil station is well-served by taxis, jeepneys, buses, and UV Express that ply the Taft Avenue route and nearby routes. Taxis and jeepneys stop near the station and can be used to transport commuters to and from Ermita.

== Gallery ==
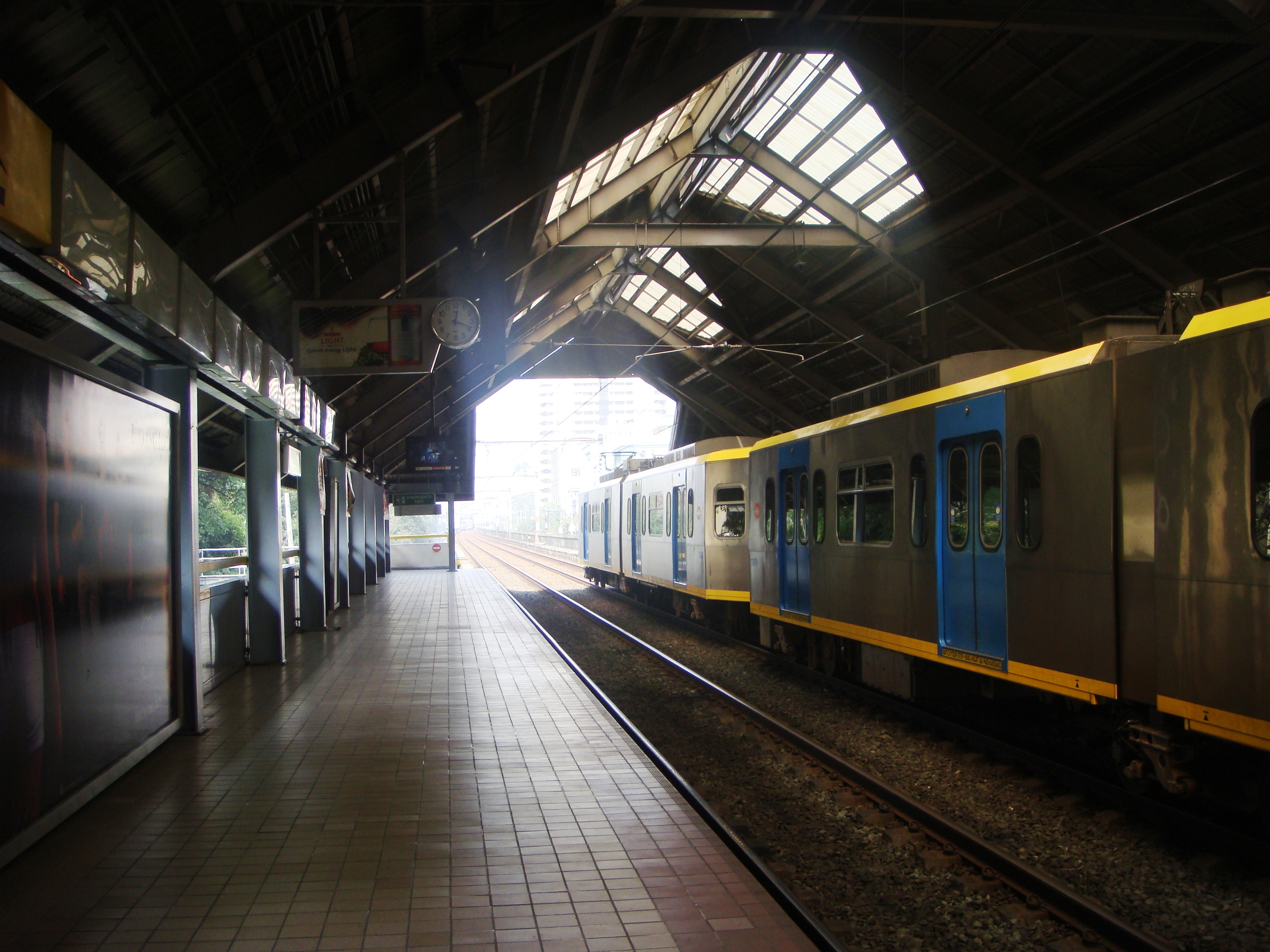
The Station at daytime

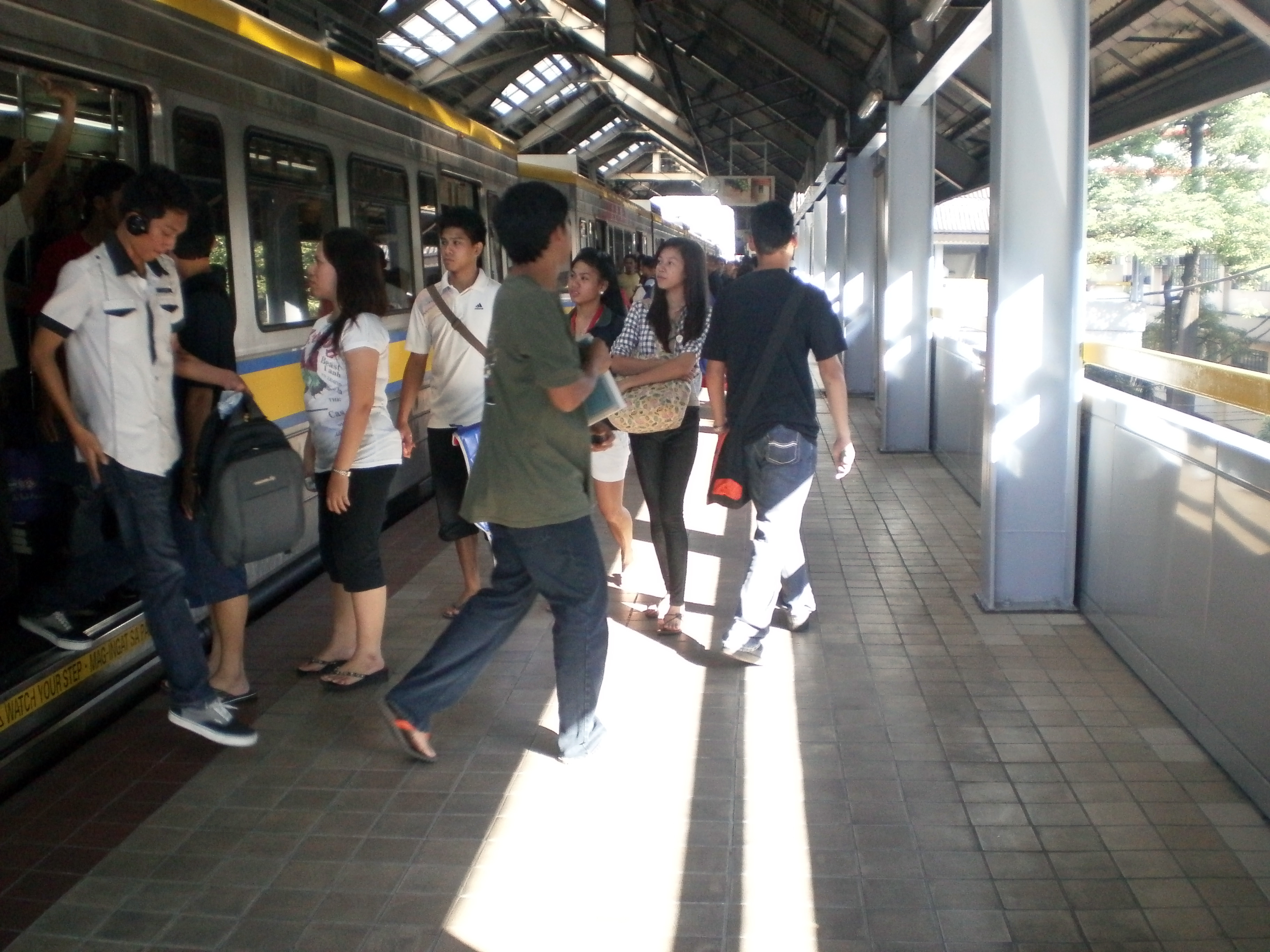
Passengers alighting from a train

== See also ==
- List of rail transit stations in Metro Manila
- Manila Light Rail Transit System
- Media related to Pedro Gil station at Wikimedia Commons
