= Gaiety Theater (Manila) =

Cinema house in Manila

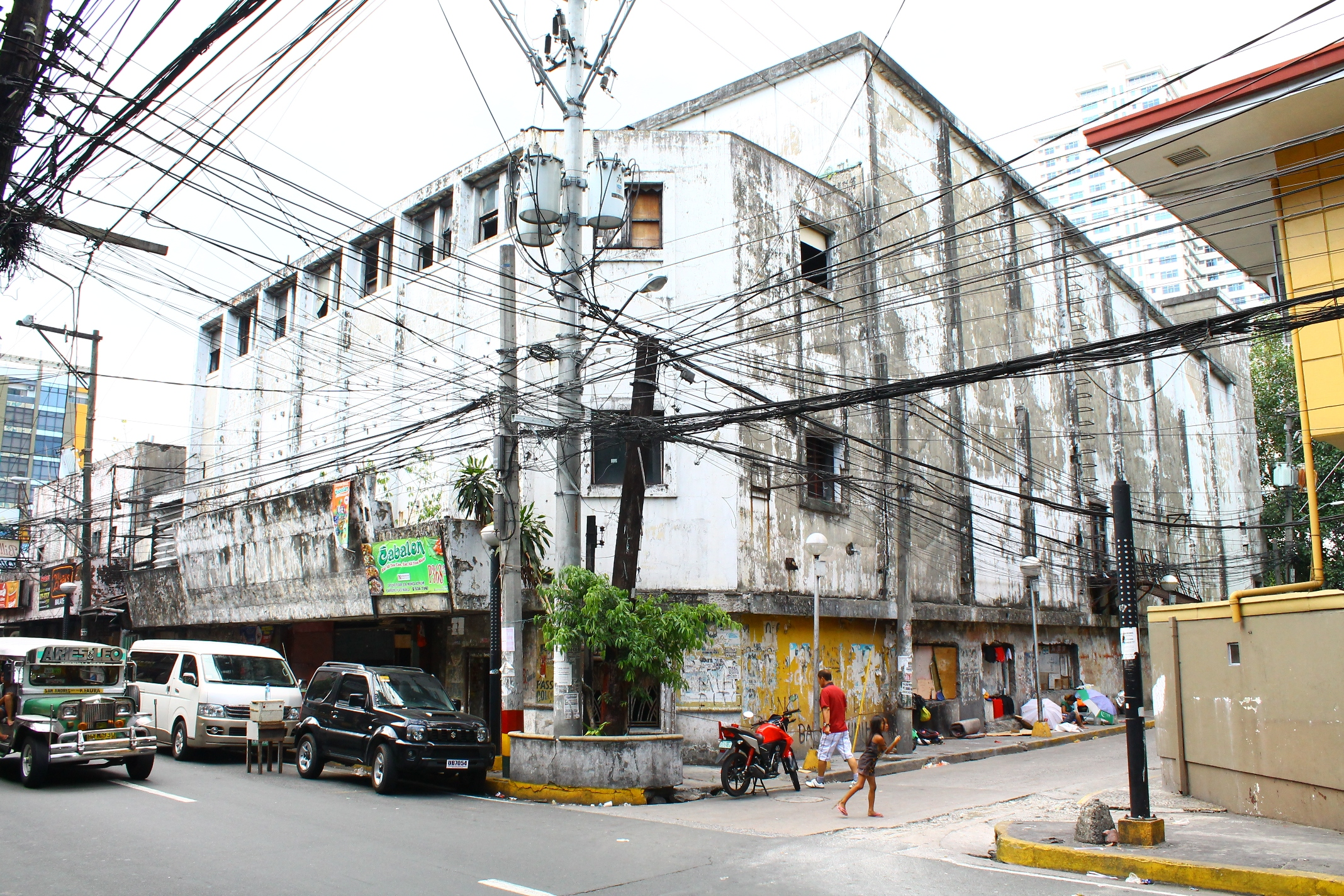
- The Gaiety Theater is located at Del Pilar Street in the Ermita district of the city of Manila. It was designed by Juan Nakpil in 1935 and is now in dilapidated state.
- Interactive map of Gaiety Theater
- Address: Del Pilar Street
- Location: Ermita, Manila
- Coordinates: 14.5742°N 120.9819°E

Construction
- Opened: 1935
- Demolished: 2016
- Architect: Juan Nakpil

The Gaiety Theater was a stand-alone art deco cinema house located at M.H. del Pilar Street in the Ermita district of the city of Manila. It was designed by Juan Nakpil, National Artist of the Philippines for Architecture, in 1935. The construction of these early theaters in the City of Manila provided the venue for early forms of entertainment like bodily, a local adaptation of vaudeville, with most eventually converting to movie theaters with the growth and popularity of Philippine cinema in the metropolis.

== History ==
The Gaiety Theater was first owned by Harry Brown, the American producer of La vida de Jose Rizal, the first feature film produced in the Philippines. It was known for showing art films patronized by expats and old Spanish families. During the Second World War, its operation was stopped until Karl Nathan obtained permission from the Japanese authorities to reopen it, which at the time was owned by a prominent Filipino family with whom Nathan had struck an agreement, provided he could get the Japanese permit. Tickets to this theater during the Japanese occupation were cheap as compared to other movie houses in downtown Manila. The theater was also used as a place of worship by the Jesus is Lord Cosmopolitan Church.

The Gaiety Theater was plot setting of the episode Mata in the starring Maja Salvador and Rayver Cruz the entering of the one way street in the 2010 horror film Cinco.

== Present ==
Until it was demolished in 2016 several families acting as caretakers of the old cinema were living inside. According to them, there were efforts to resurrect the Gaiety Theater in the 1990s but it failed. As of 2014, the theater was closed and the building remained in a dilapidated state. The roof of the building collapsed years ago leaving the cinema house open to all weather elements contributing to its fast deterioration.
