= Pedro Gil Street =

Street in Manila, Philippines

Coordinates: 14°34′52″N 121°0′38″E

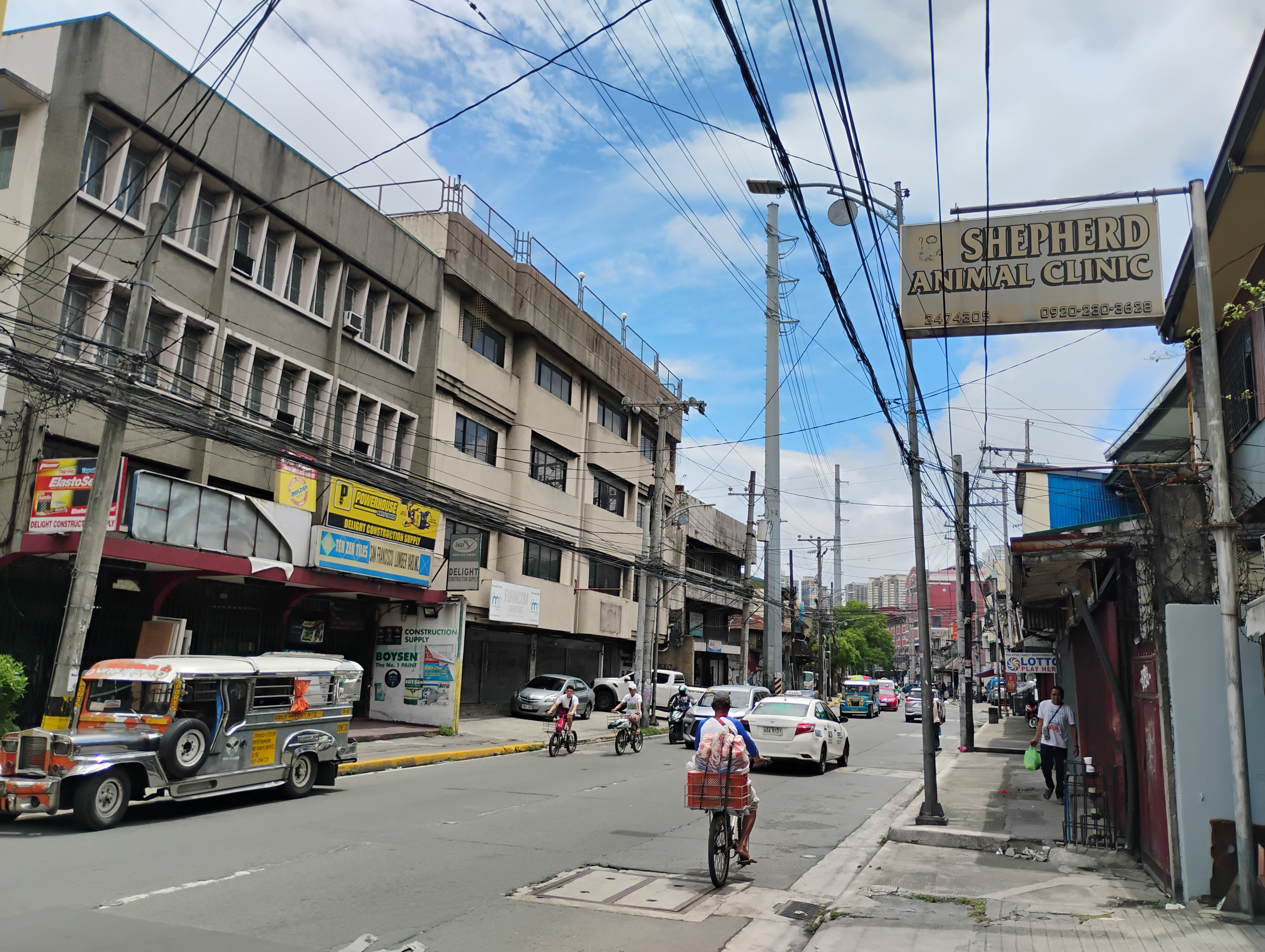
- Pedro Gil Street westbound in Paco
- Interactive map of Pedro Gil Street
- Former names: Calzada de Paco, Calle Real, Calle Herrán
- Namesake: Pedro Gil; José de la Herrán
- Type: Tertiary road
- Maintained by: Department of Public Works and Highways - South Manila District Engineering Office
- Length: 3.65 km (2.27 mi)
- Location: Manila
- West end: AH 26 (N120) (Roxas Boulevard) in Ermita and Malate
- Major junctions: N170 (Taft Avenue); N181 (San Marcelino Street); N140 (Quirino Avenue)
- East end: Calderon Street and New Panaderos Street in Santa Ana

Pedro Gil Street (formerly Herran Street) is an east-west inner city street and a tertiary national road in south-central Manila, Philippines. It is 3.65 kilometers (2.27 mi) long and spans the entire length of Ermita, Malate, Paco, and Santa Ana. The street is served by the Pedro Gil LRT Station along Taft Avenue and the Paco railway station along Quirino Avenue. It also continues towards the central Metro Manila cities of Mandaluyong and San Juan across the Pasig River as New Panaderos and General Kalentong Streets.

The street was named after Pedro Gil, a Filipino diplomat and legislator from Manila who first gained popularity in the area as a physician. It was previously known as Herran Street, after José Rafael de la Herrán y Lacoste, a Spanish captain (and Mayor of Tondo) during the Battle of Manila Bay.

== Route description ==
From the east, Pedro Gil Street originates at the intersection with Calderon and New Panaderos Streets, fronting the Santa Ana Church in Santa Ana district, where it is divided by a median of greenery and sculptures known as Plaza Felipe Calderon. Heading west, it passes by the Santa Ana Market before it narrows into a four-lane undivided road west of Medel Street. Continuing past old heritage houses and a few commercial establishments, Pedro Gil crosses into the northern portion of San Andres and Paco districts, where it is interrupted by the Paco railway station and Quirino Avenue. The downtown portion of Paco, Ermita, and Malate lie across this intersection, passing by the Paco Church, Robinsons Manila shopping mall, and universities such as the University of the Philippines Manila and St. Paul University Manila. The Ermita-Malate portion, where the street serves as a boundary, also contains several hotels like the New World Manila Bay Hotel (formerly Hyatt Hotel & Casino Manila). Roxas Boulevard lies at its western end.

The street is mostly a two-way road as its sections between Quirino Avenue and Peñafrancia Street and between Agoncillo Street and Roxas Boulevard are one-way eastbound.

== History ==
The origin of Pedro Gil Street could be traced back to an old road that connected the then-towns of Paco (San Fernando de Dilao) and Santa Ana, based on early 19th century maps. In the 19th century, it was extended to the west towards Calle Real (now Del Pilar Street) near Manila Bay, effectively connecting both towns with the old national road.

The road in Malate, Ermita, and Paco was called Calzada de Paco or Calzada de Malate á Paco. Later, it was named Calle [de la] Herrán (after the Spanish captain José de la Herrán, who fought during the Battle of Manila Bay). Through Paco, it was known as Calle Real and past Estero Beata, it was known as Calle Dulumbayan (from dulo ng bayan, meaning "the edge of town"). The name Calle Real also applied to the east up to Santa Ana. Its section leading to Santa Ana was historically known as Carretera de Sta. Ana. Its present-day section, divided by Plaza Felipe Calderon in Santa Ana, was known as Calle Sta. María. The street was later extended to the west towards present-day Roxas Boulevard. Its section from General Luna eastwards was also one of the right-of-way alignments of tranvía that existed until 1945.

Its section between General Luna and Tejeron also formed part of Highway 21, which linked Manila to Calamba, Laguna, by circumscribing Laguna de Bay through the province of Rizal.

Herran Street was renamed Pedro Gil Street after the death of its namesake, Pedro Gil, in 1965.

== Intersections ==
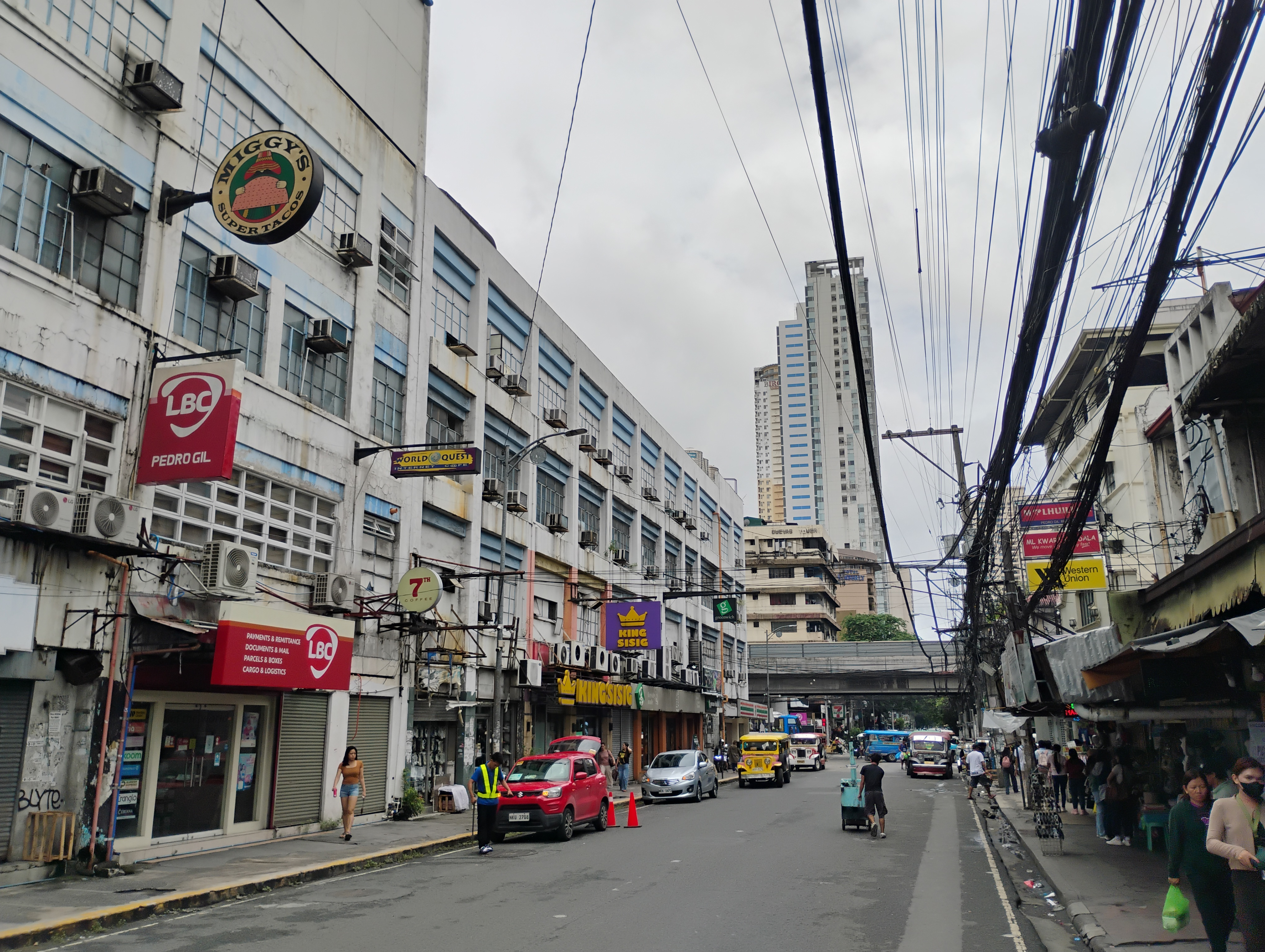
Pedro Gil Street westbound towards its intersection with Taft Avenue

The entire route is located in Manila. Intersections are numbered by kilometer post, with Rizal Park designated as kilometer zero.

km	mi	Destinations	Notes
1.062	0.660	AH 26 (N120) (Roxas Boulevard)	Western terminus. Traffic light intersection.
		Del Pilar Street	Traffic light intersection. One-way southbound.
		Mabini Street	Traffic light intersection. One-way northbound.
		Adriatico Street	One-way southbound
		Bocobo Street	One-way entry only
		Maria Orosa Street	
		L.M. Guerrero Street	One-way entry only
		Vasquez Street	
		Pilar Hidalgo Lim Street	
		N170 (Taft Avenue)	Traffic light intersection.
2	1.2	Leon Guinto Street	One-way towards Padre Faura Street
		Agoncillo Street	One-way northbound; Change from one-way eastbound street to two-way street.
		N181 (San Marcelino Street)	One-way southbound
		Benitez Street	One-way northbound
		Singalong Street	One-way southbound
		General Luna Street	One-way towards Paco Park
		Angel Linao Street	One-way road
		Santiago Street	
		Paz Street	One-way towards Quirino Avenue Extension
		Merced Street	One-way towards Lanuza Street
		F.M. Gernale Street	One-way towards San Gregorio Street
		Peñafrancia Street	One-way road; Pedro Gil changes from two-way street to one-way eastbound street.
		N140 (Quirino Avenue) / Figueroa Street	Change from one-way eastbound street back to two-way street
		Skyway	Entrance only; originating from Skyway's northbound Quirino off-ramp
		Railroad crossing - Paco station	
		Fabie Street	
		Main Street	
		Antonio Isip Sr. Street	
		Onyx Street	
		Road 10889	
		Pasig Line	
		Kampampangan Street	
		Aragon Street	
		Felix Street	
		Eden Street	
		Tejeron Street / Dr. M.L. Carreon Street	Traffic light intersection
		Bo. Banting Street	
		Medel Street	
		Vesta Street	Eastbound access only
		M. Roxas Street	Eastbound access only
		Market Road	Westbound access only
		Calderon Street / New Panaderos Street	Eastern terminus
1.000 mi = 1.609 km; 1.000 km = 0.621 mi: Incomplete access

== Landmarks ==
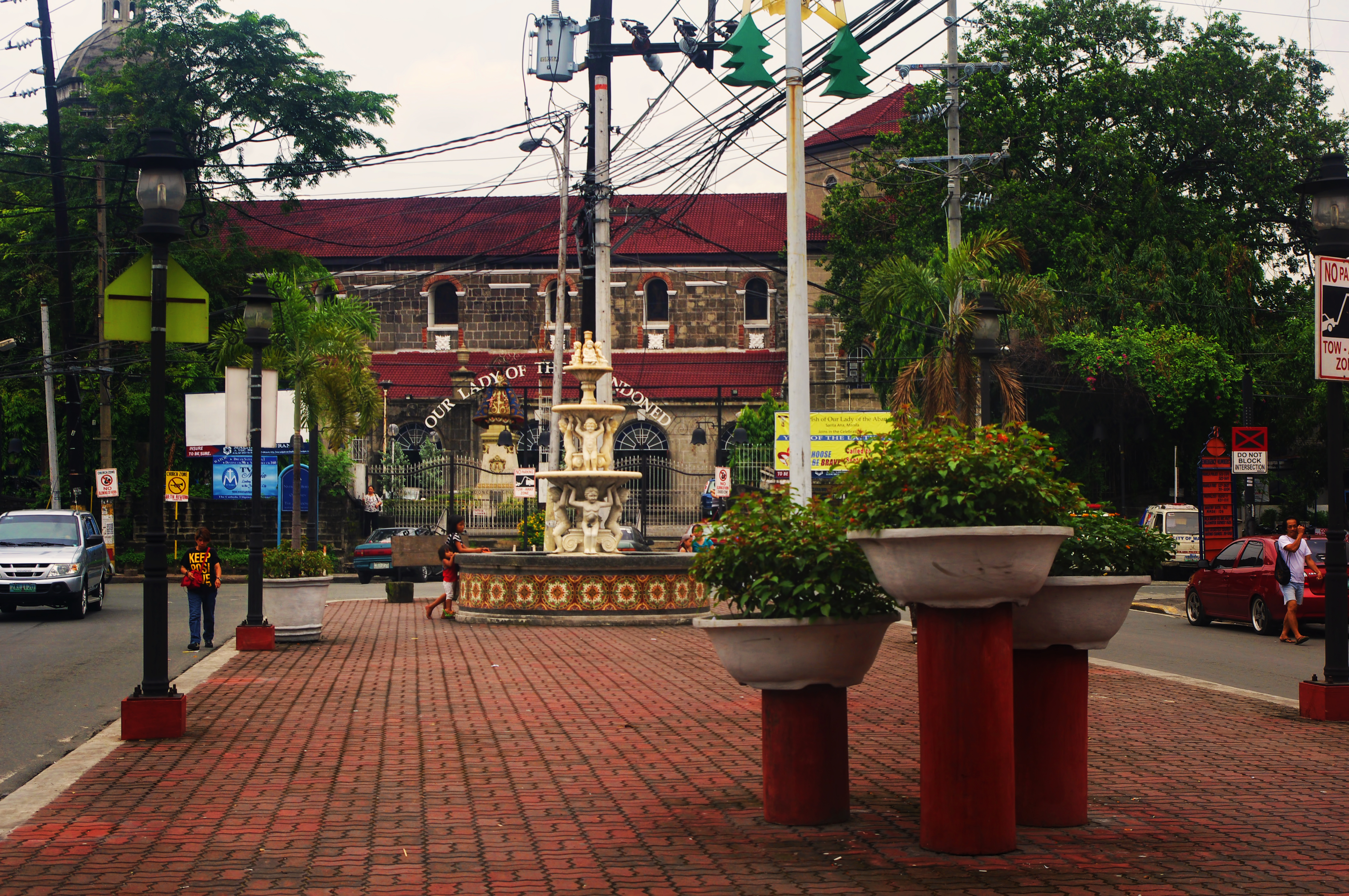
Plaza Felipe Calderon is located in the landscaped median just east of Tejeron Street in Santa Ana.

Pedro Gil Street is home to several educational institutions, such as the University of the Philippines Manila, Saint Paul University Manila and Philippine Christian University in Malate, the Colegio de la Inmaculada Concepcion de la Concordia, Paco Catholic School, Fernando Maria Guerrero Elementary School in Paco, and OB Montessori Center in Santa Ana. It is also the location of Robinsons Manila shopping mall, New World Manila Bay Hotel and Casino, and Hotel Kimberly in the tourist zone just east of Roxas Boulevard. The street also provides access to the San Fernando de Dilao Church (Paco Church) and Paraiso ng Batang Maynila community park, as well as the Nuestra Señora de los Desamparados Church (Santa Ana Church) and Plaza Felipe Calderon located at the street's eastern end. Santa Ana Public Market and Paco Market are the biggest wholesale markets on Pedro Gil Street. It is served by Pedro Gil station on Taft Avenue and Paco station at its intersection with Quirino Avenue. The Santa Ana Ferry Terminal is also located near the Santa Ana Church.

== See also ==
- Major roads in Manila
- List of renamed streets in Manila
- Media related to Pedro Gil Street at Wikimedia Commons
