= Quirino station (LRT) =

Train station in Manila, Philippines

Coordinates: 14°34′12.79″N 120°59′30.03″E

Quirino	GL16
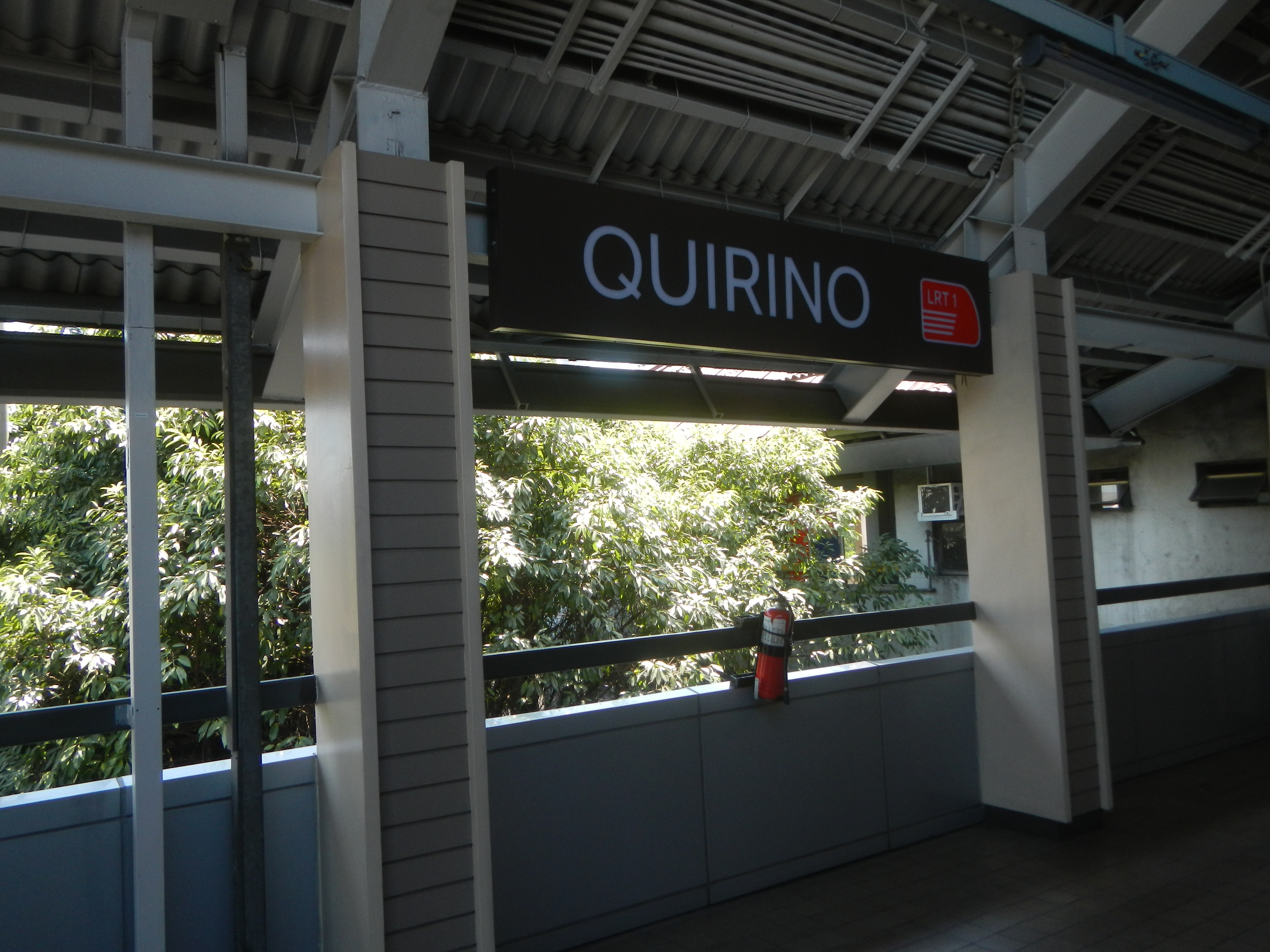

General information
- Other names: Quirino Avenue
- Location: Taft Avenue, Malate; Manila, Metro Manila, Philippines
- Owner: Department of Transportation – Light Rail Transit Authority
- Operator: Light Rail Manila Corporation
- Line: LRT Line 1
- Platforms: 2 (2 side)
- Tracks: 2

Construction
- Structure type: Elevated

History
- Opened: December 1, 1984; 41 years ago
- Former names: President Quirino

Services
Preceding station	Manila LRT	Following station
Pedro Gil towards Fernando Poe Jr.	LRT Line 1	Vito Cruz towards Dr. Santos
Track layout
Location
- Location within Manila Location within Metro Manila Location within Luzon Location within Philippines

Quirino station, also formerly known as President Quirino station, is an elevated Light Rail Transit (LRT) station located on the LRT Line 1 (LRT-1) system in Malate, Manila Philippines. It is situated at the intersection of Taft Avenue, San Andres Street and Quirino Avenue. The station and Quirino Avenue are both named after former president Elpidio Quirino.

Quirino station is the eleventh station for trains headed to Fernando Poe Jr., and the fifteenth station for trains headed to Dr. Santos.

== History ==
The station was opened to the public on December 1, 1984, as part of LRT’s initial southern section, known as the Taft Line, which was the first segment to become operational.

== Transportation links ==
Quirino station is served by buses, jeepneys, and UV Express plying Taft Avenue and nearby routes, tricycles, and taxis. They stop near the station and can even be used for trips in and around Malate.

== See also ==
- List of rail transit stations in Metro Manila
- Manila Light Rail Transit System
- Media related to Quirino station (Line 1) at Wikimedia Commons
