= Pope Pius XII Catholic Center =

Religious facility in Manila

- Sentrong Katoliko ng Pope Pius XII
- Building facade

General information
- Location: Manila, Philippines
- Coordinates: 14°35′6″N 120°59′24″E
- Inaugurated: 1964

Design and construction
- Architect: Jose Maria Zaragoza

The Pope Pius XII Catholic Center is a religious facility located along United Nations Avenue in Manila, Philippines. It was designed by José María Zaragoza (1912-1994), a noted architect and National Artist of the Philippines.

The facility was inaugurated on August 26, 1964. It has been used as a venue for plenary assemblies by Catholic bishops.

The National Museum of the Philippines formally declared the facility as an important cultural property in 2024.
