= Taft Avenue =

Major road in Metro Manila, Philippines

Coordinates: 14°33′51″N 120°59′39″E

R-2

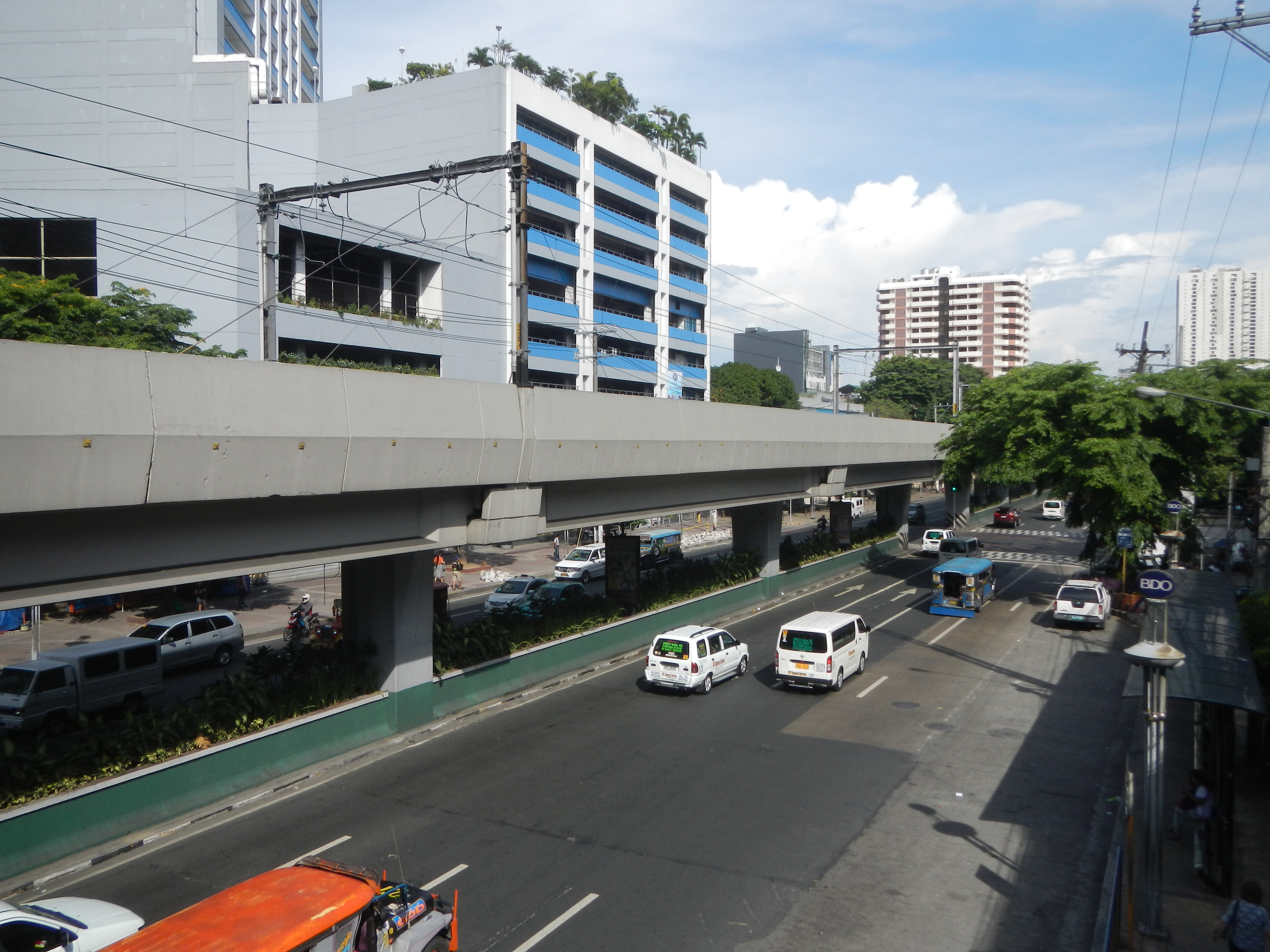
- Taft Avenue in Ermita, Manila
- Interactive map of Taft Avenue
- Former names: Calle Rizal; Manila Road; Ermita-Pasay Boulevard; Daitoa Avenue; Manila South Road / Mexico Road (extension only)
- Part of: R-2 R-2; N170 from Padre Burgos Avenue to EDSA
- Namesake: William Howard Taft
- Maintained by: the Department of Public Works and Highways
- Length: 7 km (4.3 mi); Approximate length
- North end: N150 (Padre Burgos Avenue) in Manila
- Major junctions: N180 (Finance Road & Ayala Boulevard) in Manila; N155 (Kalaw Avenue) in Manila; N156 (United Nations Avenue) in Manila; N140 (Quirino Avenue) in Manila; N190 (Gil Puyat Avenue) in Pasay; AH26 (EDSA) in Pasay
- South end: Redemptorist Road, Elpidio Quirino Avenue, and Harrison Street in Parañaque

Construction
- Completed: 1899

Taft Avenue (Filipino: Abenida Taft; Spanish: Avenida Taft) is a major road in southern Metro Manila. It passes through three cities in the metropolis: Manila, Pasay, and Parañaque. The road was named after former U.S. President William Howard Taft, who had served as the Governor-General of the Philippines from 1900 to 1903 when the Philippines was a commonwealth territory of the United States. The avenue is a component of National Route 170 (N170), a secondary road in the Philippine highway network and Radial Road 2 (R-2) of the Manila arterial road network.

== Route description ==
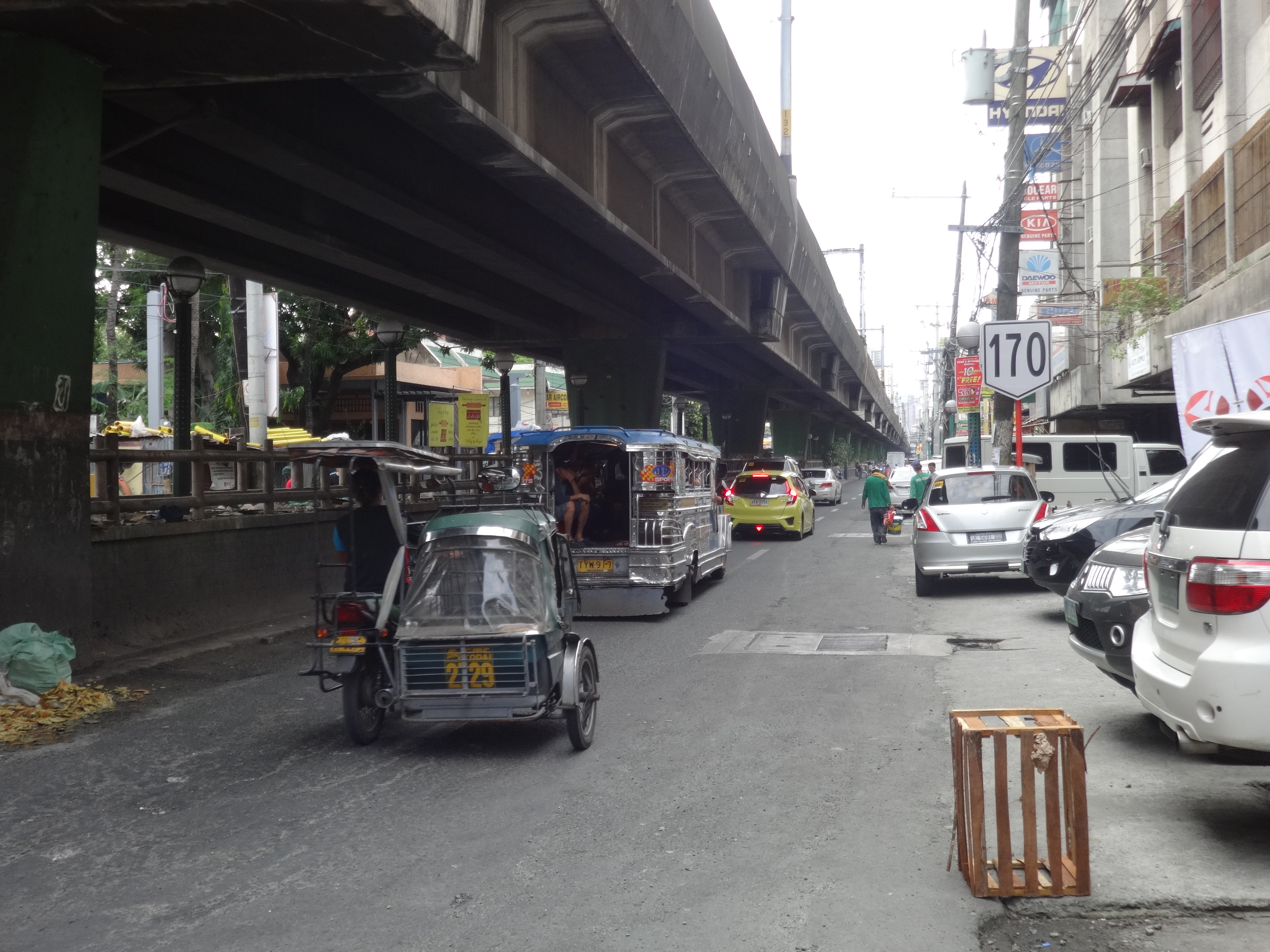
Taft Avenue in Pasay, with the N170 reassurance marker

From the north, Taft Avenue starts as an eight-lane avenue, with four lanes per direction, at the Lagusnilad vehicular underpass at its intersection with Padre Burgos Avenue in Ermita. It then crosses Ayala Boulevard and Finance Street and forms the eastern edge of Rizal Park up to Kalaw Avenue. It then crosses United Nations Avenue, Padre Faura Street, Pedro Gil Street (formerly known as Herran Street, where it also crosses the district boundary with Malate), San Andres Street, Quirino Avenue, and Pablo Ocampo Street (formerly known as Vito Cruz Street). Past Pablo Ocampo, it narrows to four lanes, with two lanes per direction, before entering the city of Pasay. In Pasay, it crosses Gil Puyat Avenue (formerly known as Buendia Avenue), Arnaiz Avenue (formerly known as Libertad Street), and Epifanio de los Santos Avenue (EDSA), where the intersection is known as Pasay Rotonda and where National Route 170 (N170) terminates. The avenue then continues south towards Baclaran in Parañaque as Taft Avenue Extension up to its terminus at its intersection with Elpidio Quirino Avenue, Harrison Street, and Redemptorist Road.

=== Rizal Park ===
One of Rizal Park's three entrances (the others being Maria Orosa Street and Roxas Boulevard), the Taft Avenue entrance is adjacent to the National Museum of Fine Arts (formerly the Old Legislative Building), the National Museum of Anthropology (formerly the Finance Building), and the Statue of the Sentinel of Freedom.

== History ==
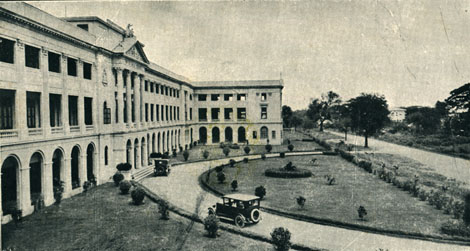
De La Salle College on Taft Avenue, c. 1920

Construction of this avenue, originally called Calle Rizal, was completed in 1899, with Calle Padre Burgos as its northern terminus and Calle Herran (now Pedro Gil Street) as its southern terminus. Engineers Manny Aquino and Robin Santos led its extension in 1911, and the avenue was renamed Manila Road. However, a map of Manila produced in 1915 by the Office of Department Engineer, Philippine Department, indicates it was named Taft Avenue. At the height of World War II, during the Japanese occupation of the Philippines, it was renamed Daitoa Avenue in 1942. The avenue's portion from Padre Burgos to Herran was also one of the right-of-way alignments of tranvía that existed until 1945.

Having previously ended at Calle San Andres in Malate, it was later extended towards Calle Vito Cruz (present-day Pablo Ocampo Street) in 1940. It was extended towards Pasay, then part of the province of Rizal, and was named Ermita-Pasay Boulevard or Highway 50. The route continued past Apelo Cruz Street (later Highway 54, now EDSA) as Cavite-Manila South Road or Manila South Road (later renamed Mexico Road in 1964). Afterwards, the avenue's section from EDSA to Baclaran became Taft Avenue Extension.

LRT Line 1, the first elevated rail track in the Philippines, was built over it and opened in 1984.

=== Proposed renaming to Senator Jose W. Diokno Avenue ===
In 1998, bills to rename Taft Avenue to Senator Jose W. Diokno Avenue, after the former senator and nationalist, were authored in the House of Representatives and Senate, respectively. Senator Franklin Drilon later filed Senate Bill No. 2011 in 2002; it was passed on the second reading in January 2004. Manila local officials, led by Mayor Lito Atienza, opposed the passage, arguing that William Howard Taft was a "key figure in the history" of the Philippines and of Manila for establishing a civil government in the country. Additionally, they contended that the move contradicted a Manila city ordinance passed in 1998 or 1999, which disallows the renaming of streets.

Later, on June 30, 2004, Senator Sergio Osmeña III authored Senate Bill No. 497, another Senate Bill seeking to rename Taft Avenue to Senator Jose W. Diokno Avenue. However, the bill is still pending in the committee as of August 2004. Moreover, a road in Bay City in Pasay and Parañaque has already been named Jose W. Diokno Boulevard.

== Landmarks ==
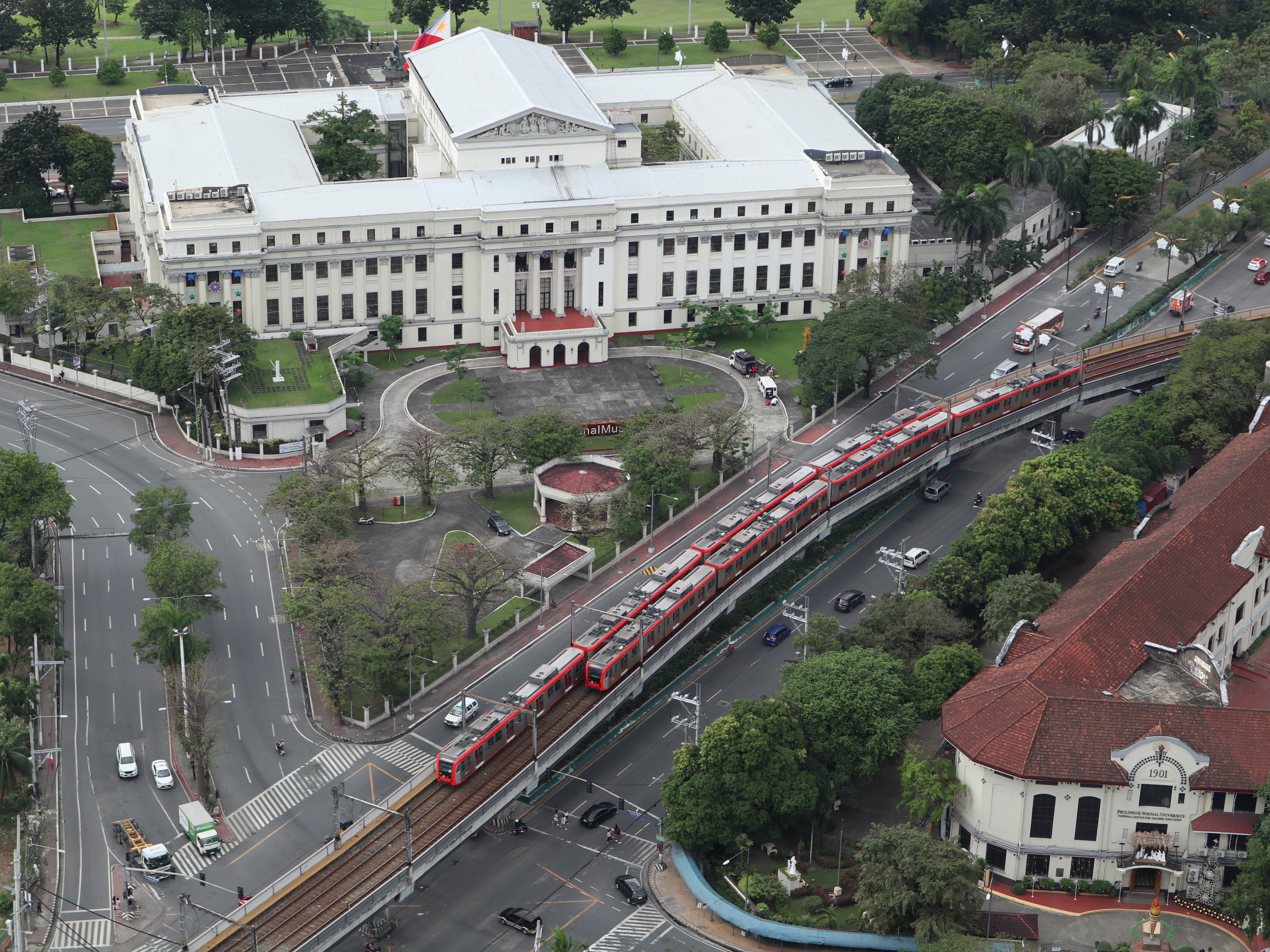
Aerial view of Taft Avenue with LRT Line 1, Finance Drive, the National Museum of Fine Arts, and the Philippine Normal University

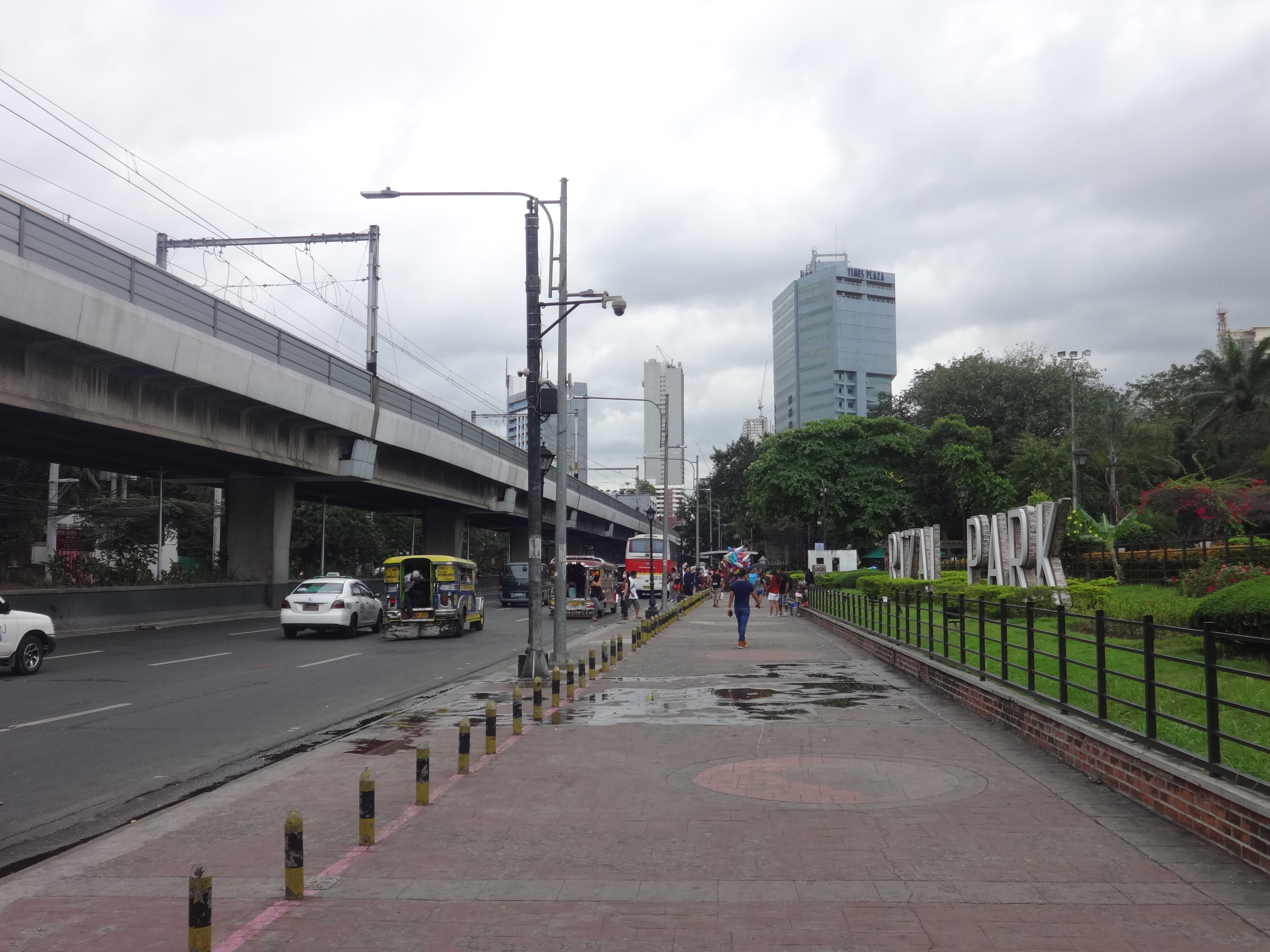
Rizal Park along Taft Avenue

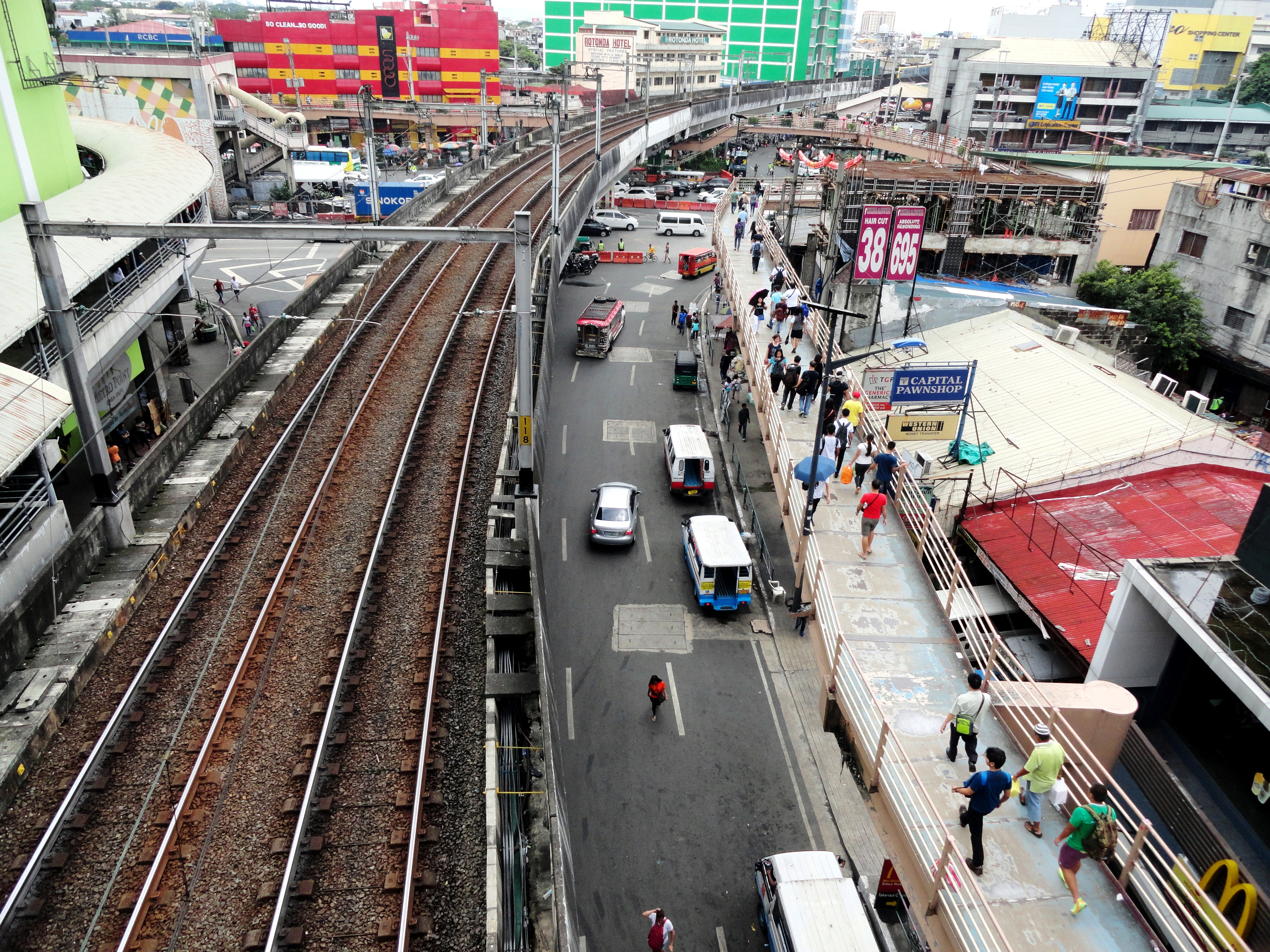
Taft Avenue's intersection with EDSA, also known as Pasay Rotonda

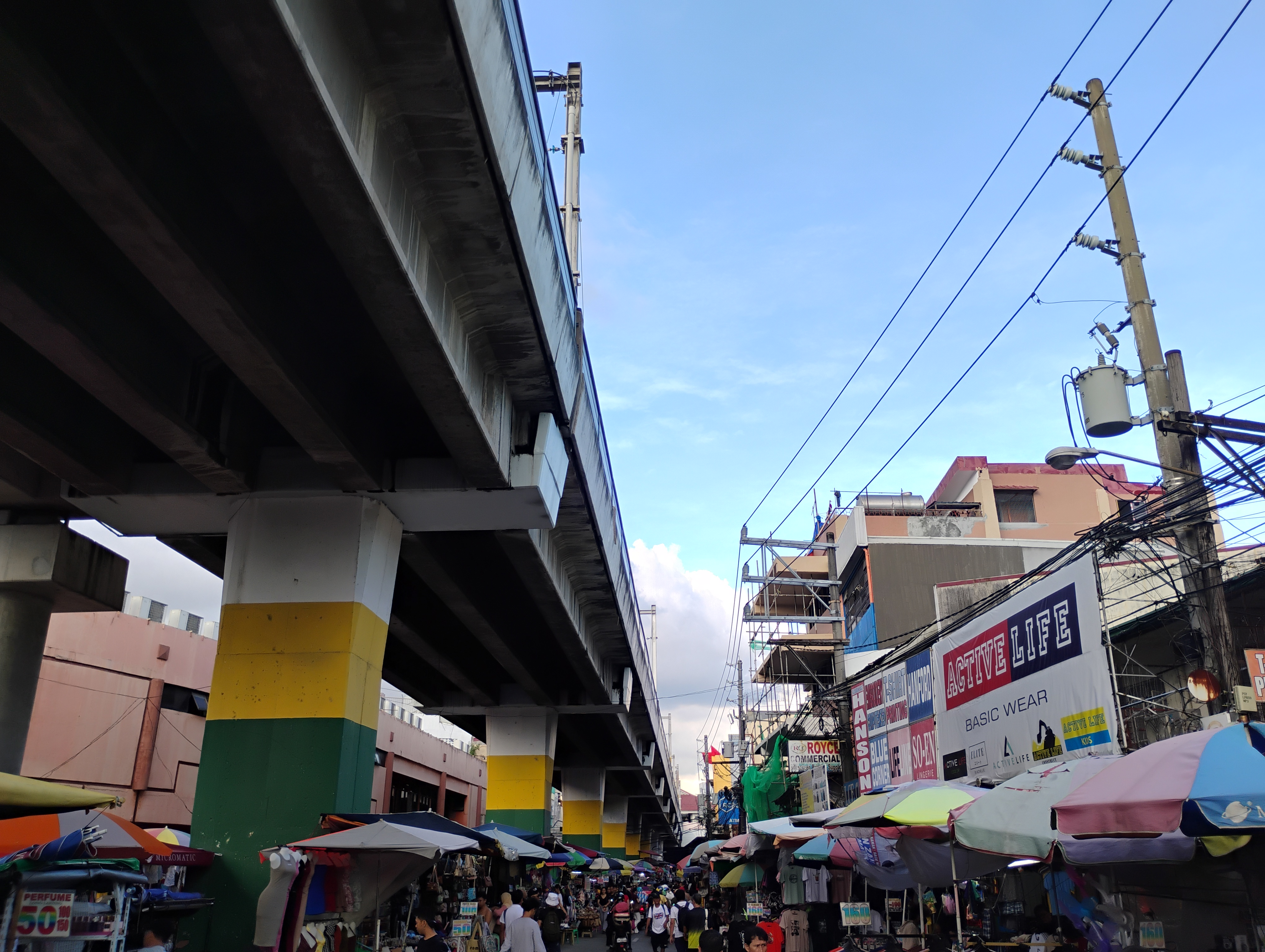
Taft Avenue Extension with flea markets in Baclaran, Parañaque

This shows landmarks starting from north to south:

=== Manila ===
- National Museum of Fine Arts
- Philippine Normal University
- Manila City Library
- Rizal Park
- Santa Isabel College Manila
- Torre de Manila
- Plaza Olivia Salamanca
- Araullo High School
- United Nations station
- Medical Center Manila
- Plaza Rueda
- World Health Organization, Western Pacific headquarters
- National Bureau of Investigation old headquarters
- Cathedral of Praise
- Manila Science High School
- Supreme Court of the Philippines
- University of the Philippines Manila
  - Philippine General Hospital
- Iglesia Filipina Independiente National Cathedral
- Pedro Gil station
- Philippine Christian University
- Philippine Women's University
- Manila Scottish Rite Temple
- Quirino Avenue station
- Palace of the Archbishop of Manila
  - Apostolic Nunciature to the Philippines
- De La Salle University
- Vito Cruz station
- De La Salle–College of Saint Benilde

=== Pasay ===
- Arellano University, Mabini campus (Arellano University School of Law)
- San Isidro Catholic School
  - San Isidro Labrador Parish Church
- Gil Puyat station
- Arellano University, Abad Santos campus
- Victory Pasay Mall
- Libertad station
- Cartimar Shopping Center
- Southeastern College
- Mapúa Mansion
- EDSA station
- Metro Point Mall
- Baclaran station

== Intersections ==
Intersections are numbered by kilometer post, with Rizal Park in Manila designated as kilometer zero.

Province	City/Municipality	km	mi	Destinations	Notes
Manila				N150 (Padre Burgos Avenue)	Northern terminus. No left turn from northbound.
Manila				Antonio Villegas Street	Northbound entrance and exit only.
Manila				N180 (Finance Road & Ayala Boulevard) C-1	Traffic light intersection.
Manila				N155 (Kalaw Avenue)	Traffic light intersection.
Manila				N156 (United Nations Avenue) / General Luna Street	Traffic light intersection. No left turn from both sides.
Manila				Padre Faura Street	Traffic light intersection. One-way road.
Manila				Apacible Street	Northbound entrance only.
Manila				PGH Road	Traffic light intersection. Access to Philippine General Hospital
Manila				Escoda Street	Northbound entrance only.
Manila				Pedro Gil Street	Traffic light intersection. One-way road.
Manila				General Malvar Street	Traffic light intersection. One-way road.
Manila				Nakpil Street	Traffic light intersection. One-way road.
Manila		3	1.9	Remedios Street	Traffic light intersection. One-way road.
Manila				N140 (Quirino Avenue) / San Andres Street C-2	Traffic light intersection. No left turn on both sides.
Manila				Castro Street	Unsignalized intersection.
Manila				Dagonoy Street	Northbound access only.
Manila		4	2.5	Estrada Street	Traffic light intersection. Entrance only.
Manila				Ocampo Street	Traffic light intersection. No left turn from northbound.
Pasay				13 de Agosto Street	Northbound access only.
Pasay				Menlo Street	Unsignalized intersection.
Pasay				Inquimboy Street	Northbound access only.
Pasay				Leogardo Street	Northbound entry only.
Pasay				Lakas ng Bayan Street	Northbound entry only.
Pasay				San Juan Street	Unsignalized intersection.
Pasay				Samonte Street	Northbound access only.
Pasay				N190 (Gil Puyat Avenue) C-3	Opposite directions provided by U-turn slot.
Pasay				G. Villanueva Street	Unsignalized intersection.
Pasay				Cartimar Road	Traffic light intersection.
Pasay				Taylo Street	Unsignalized intersection.
Pasay				College Road	Unsignalized intersection.
Pasay				Villareal Street	Unsignalized intersection. Entrance only.
Pasay		5	3.1	Arnaiz Avenue	Traffic light intersection.
Pasay				Market Road	Southbound entry only.
Pasay				Primero de Mayo Street	Southbound access only.
Pasay				Escobal Street	Southbound access only.
Pasay				Raymundo Street	Southbound access only.
Pasay				Lions Road, Protacio Street	Traffic light intersection.
Pasay		7	4.3	F. Sanchez Street	Southbound entry only.
Pasay				Vergel Street, Pilapil Street	Unsignalized intersection.
Pasay				AH26 (EDSA) C-4	Traffic light intersection (Pasay Rotonda). No left turn on both sides. Change from N170 to unnumbered highway.
Pasay				Cuneta Avenue	Unsignalized intersection.
Pasay				F. Angeles Street	Southbound only.
Pasay				Narra Street	Unsignalized intersection.
Pasay				Park Avenue	Southbound only.
Parañaque				E. Rodriguez Street	Unsignalized intersection.
Parañaque				N62 (Elpidio Quirino Avenue) / Harrison Street R-2	Southern terminus and southern end of R-2 segment. Continues southwards as Redemptorist Road.
1.000 mi = 1.609 km; 1.000 km = 0.621 mi: Concurrency terminus; Incomplete access; Route transition

== Transportation ==
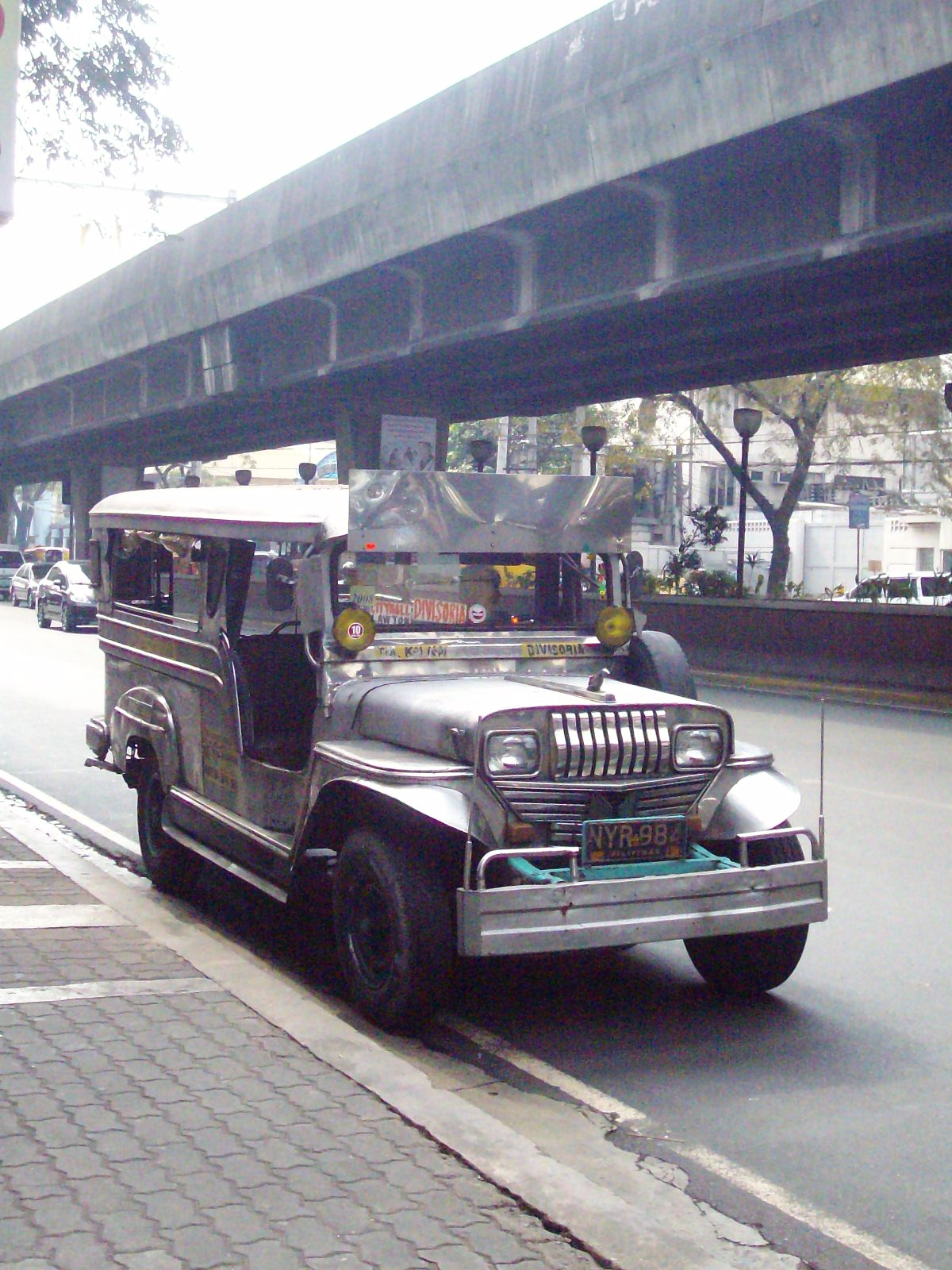
Jeepneys serve as an alternative mode of transportation along Taft Avenue.

Taft Avenue can be accessed through jeepneys, taxis, buses, UV Express, the LRT Line 1, and the MRT Line 3. The avenue houses some LRT Line 1 stations: Baclaran on Taft Avenue Extension, EDSA (interchange to MRT Line 3 at Taft Avenue station), Libertad, Gil Puyat, Vito Cruz, Quirino, Pedro Gil, and United Nations.
