= Kalaw Avenue =

Street in Manila, Philippines

Coordinates: 14°34′53″N 120°58′50″E

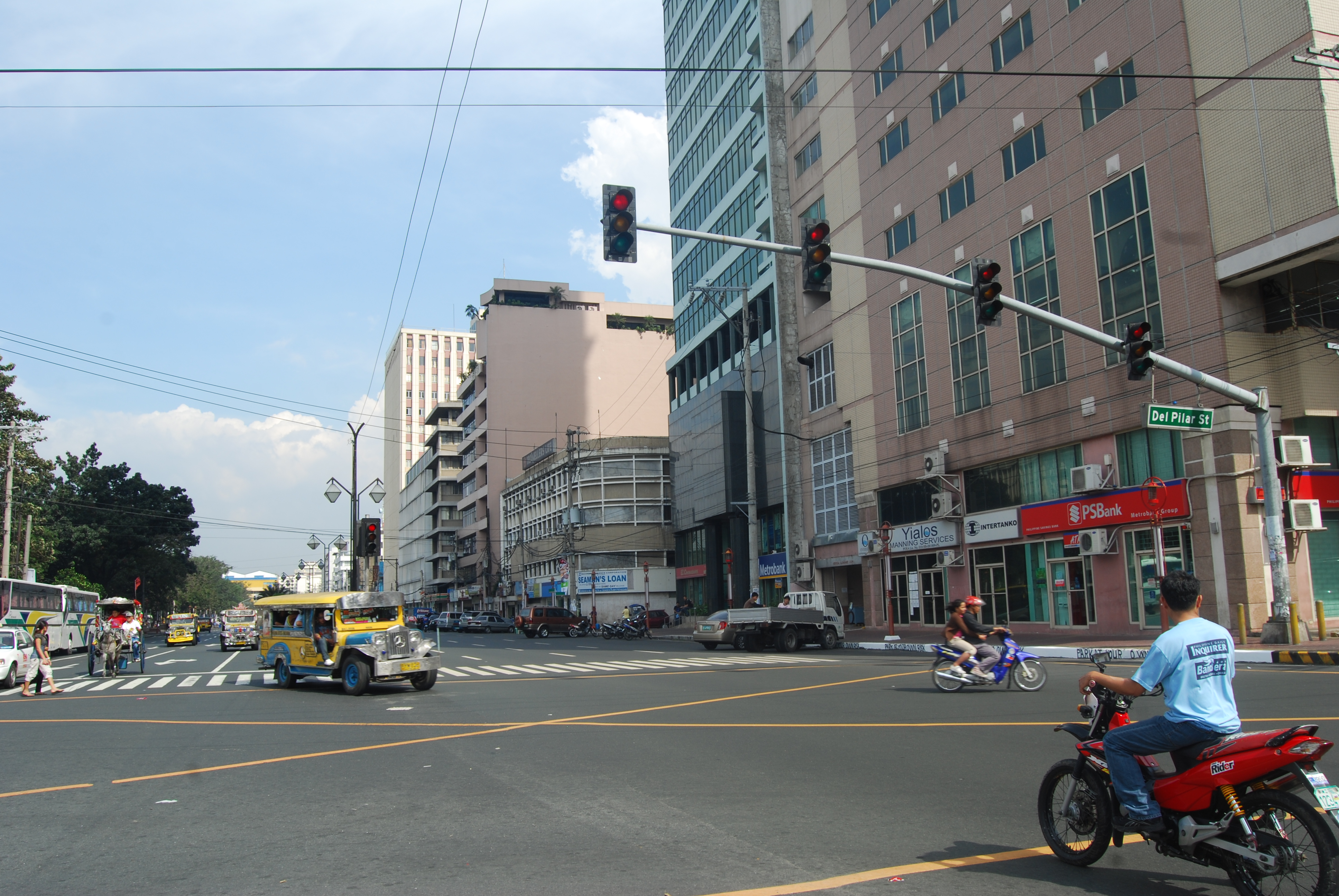
- Kalaw Avenue south of Rizal Park
- Interactive map of Kalaw Avenue
- Former names: T.M. Kalaw Street; San Luis Street
- Part of: N155 from Taft Avenue to Roxas Boulevard
- Namesake: Teodoro Kalaw
- Maintained by: Department of Public Works and Highways - South Manila District Engineering Office (Note: DPWH maintenance does not include the unnumbered extension (Kalaw Street).)
- Length: 1.4 km (0.87 mi); Includes 0.3 km (0.19 mi) extension
- Location: Manila
- East end: N181 (San Marcelino Street)
- Major junctions: N170 (Taft Avenue); Maria Orosa Avenue; Bocobo Street; Mabini Street; Del Pilar Street
- West end: AH 26 (N120) (Roxas Boulevard)

Kalaw Avenue (formerly T.M. Kalaw Street) is a short stretch of road in the Ermita district of Manila, Philippines. It forms the southern boundary of Rizal Park, running east–west from San Marcelino Street to Roxas Boulevard near the city center. It begins as a four-lane road at the intersection with San Marcelino, widening to an eight-lane divided roadway along the stretch of Rizal Park from Taft Avenue west to Roxas Boulevard. It has a short extension into the reclaimed area of Luneta and Quirino Grandstand as South Drive. The avenue's main section between Taft Avenue and Roxas Boulevard is assigned as National Route 155 (N155) of the Philippine highway network.

The avenue was named after Teodoro Kalaw, a Filipino legislator and historian of the Philippine Commonwealth period who also served as Director of the National Library of the Philippines (whose post-war incarnation lies along the street). It was formerly known as San Luis Street (Spanish: Calle San Luis), which once ran between the old Manila Bay shoreline at Luneta (present-day Rizal Park) and Calle de Nozaleda (present-day General Luna Street) up to the American occupation.

== Intersections ==
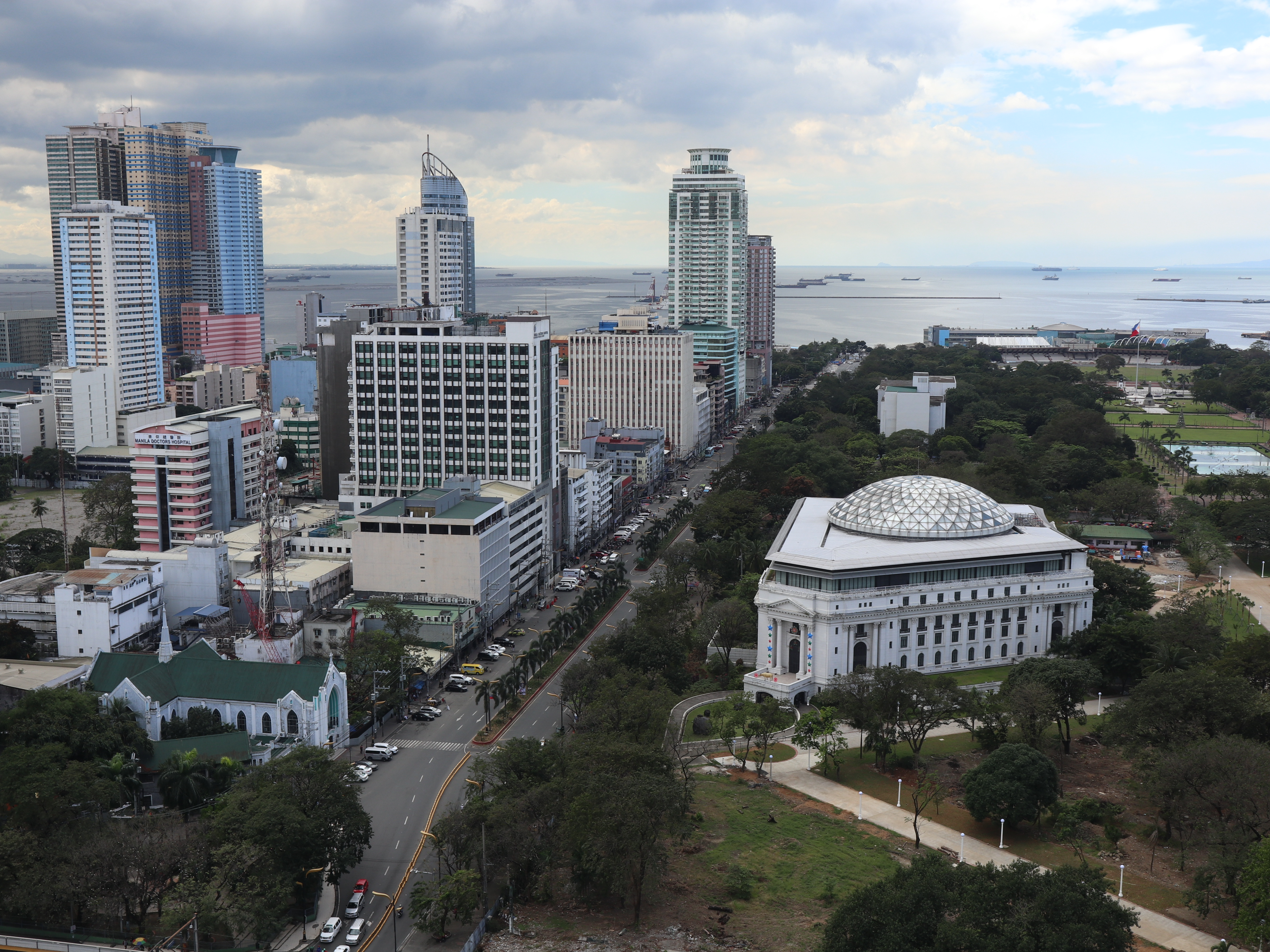
Aerial view of Kalaw Avenue

The entire route is located in Manila.

km	mi	Destinations	Notes
		AH 26 (N120) (Roxas Boulevard)	Western terminus. Continues to Quirino Grandstand as South Road.
		Roxas Boulevard East Service Road	Eastbound access only
		Alhambra Street	Eastbound access only
		Guerrero Street	Eastbound access only
		Del Pilar Street	Traffic light intersection
		Cortada Street	Eastbound access only
		Mabini Street	Unsignalized intersection
		San Carlos Street	Eastbound access only
		Churucca Street	Eastbound access only
		Jorge Bocobo Street	Unsignalized intersection
		Maria Orosa Street	Traffic light intersection, no left turn allowed from westbound.
		General Luna Street	Traffic light intersection. Closed intersection.
		N170 (Taft Avenue)	Traffic light intersection. Change from N155 to unnumbered highway. East end of DPWH maintenance.
		N181 (San Marcelino Street)	Eastern terminus.
1.000 mi = 1.609 km; 1.000 km = 0.621 mi: Incomplete access; Route transition

== Landmarks ==
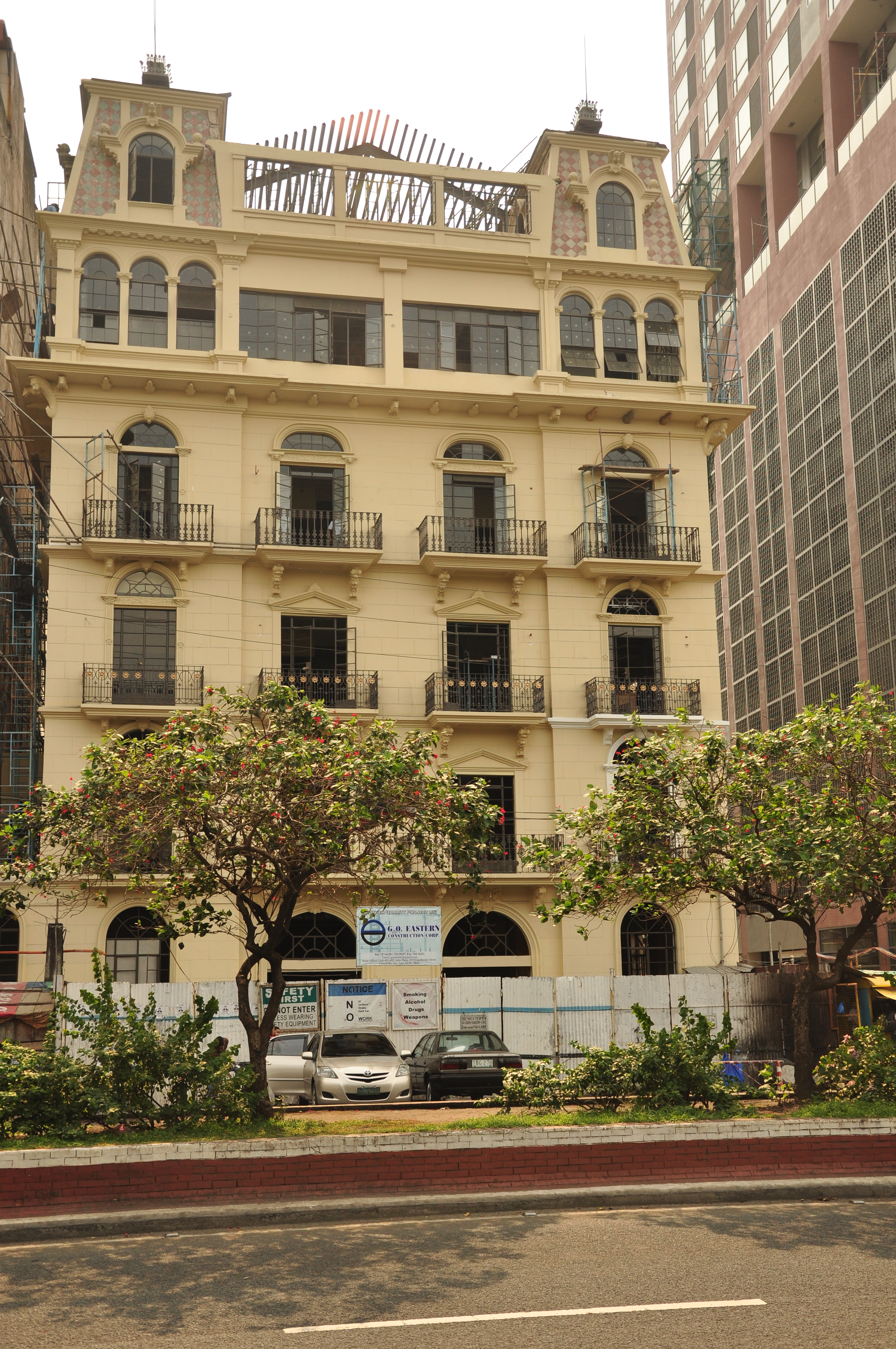
Luneta Hotel

Kalaw Avenue is the main access to some of Rizal Park's main attractions, such as the National Museum of Natural History (former Department of Tourism Building), Museo Pambata, the National Library of the Philippines, and Manila Ocean Park. Just across the street from Rizal Park are the Central United Methodist Church, the Luneta Theater, the Luneta Hotel, and the Eton Baypark residential tower. The Casino Español de Manila, destroyed during World War II, was rebuilt on its original site in 1951 near the avenue's intersection with Taft Avenue, which housed the Instituto Cervantes de Manila. Also located at this eastern end of Kalaw are the Plaza Salamanca, the Manila Prince Hotel, and the Masagana Superstore (SM Savemore). The National Historical Commission of the Philippines has its headquarters in Rizal Park along Kalaw Avenue, beside the National Library. The George S.K. Ty Medical Tower (formerly Norberto Ty Medical Tower) of the Manila Doctors Hospital is also located along Kalaw Avenue.

== See also ==
- List of renamed streets in Manila
