= List of eponymous streets in Metro Manila =

The following is a list of eponymous streets and squares in Metro Manila — that is, streets or roads and plazas named after people — with notes on the link between the road/plaza and the person.

== Streets ==
=== Gallery ===
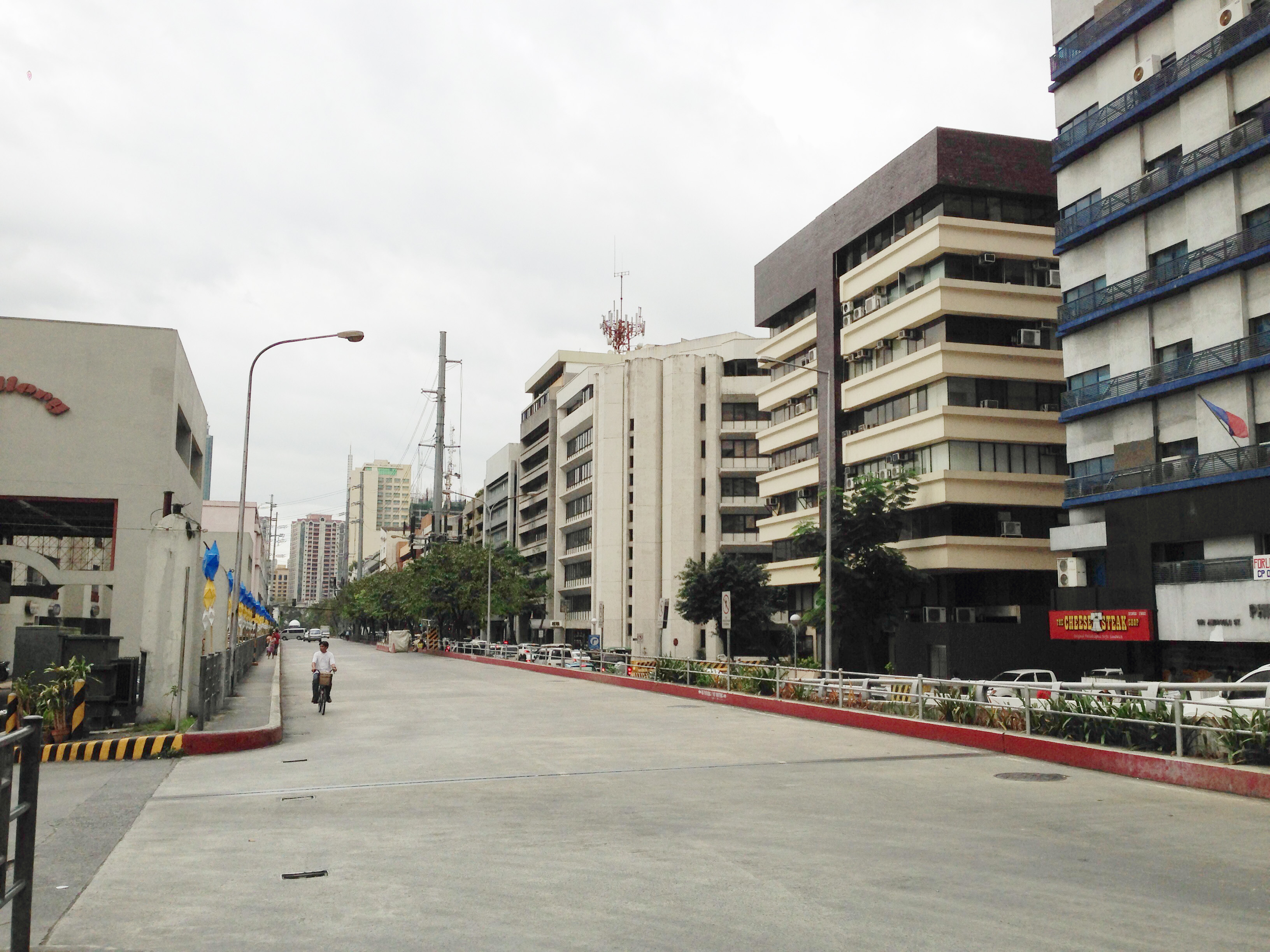
Amorsolo Street in Makati is named after the Filipino painter Fernando Amorsolo.

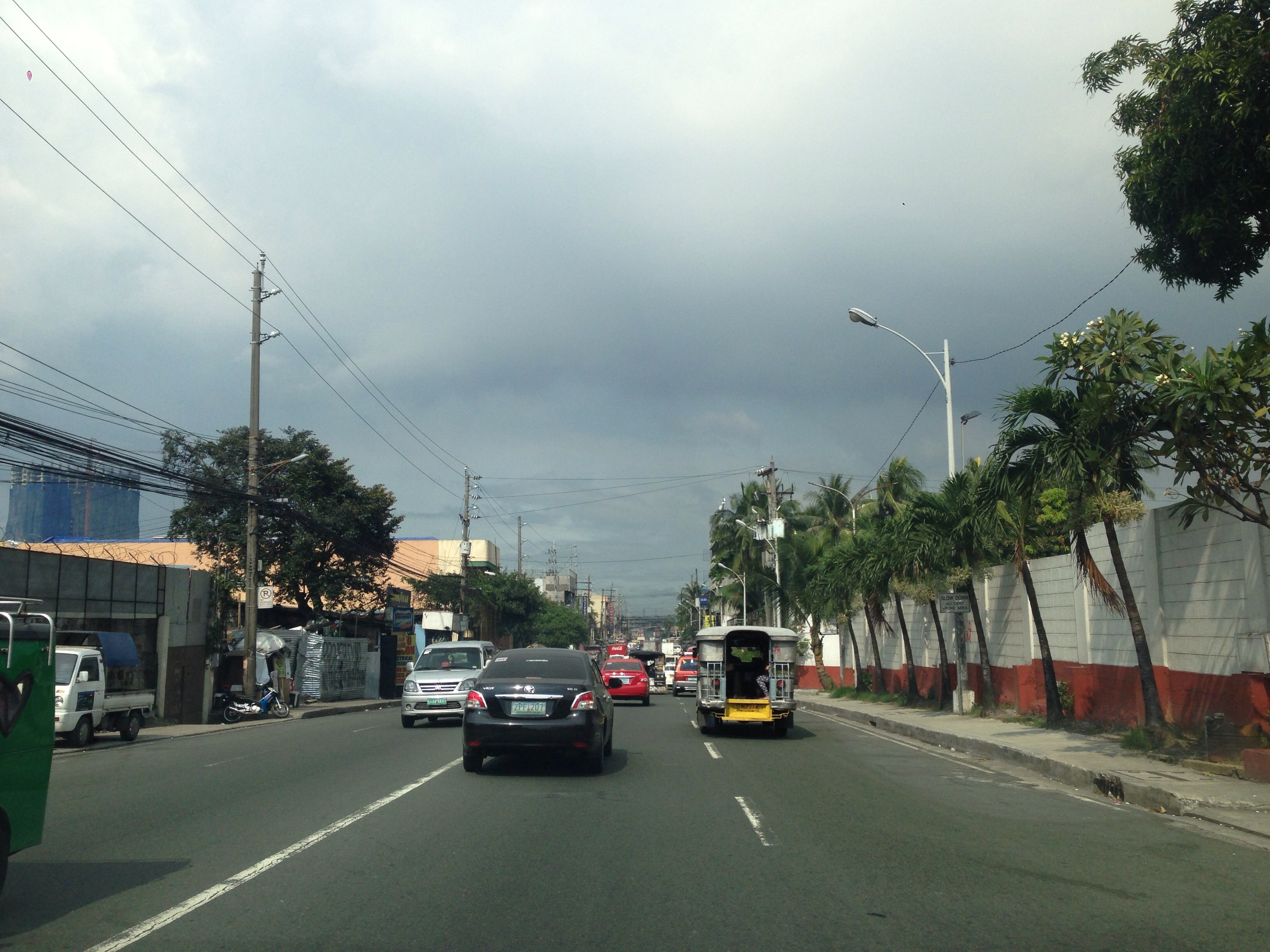
Fernando Poe Jr. Avenue in Quezon City is named after the movie action star Fernando Poe Jr.

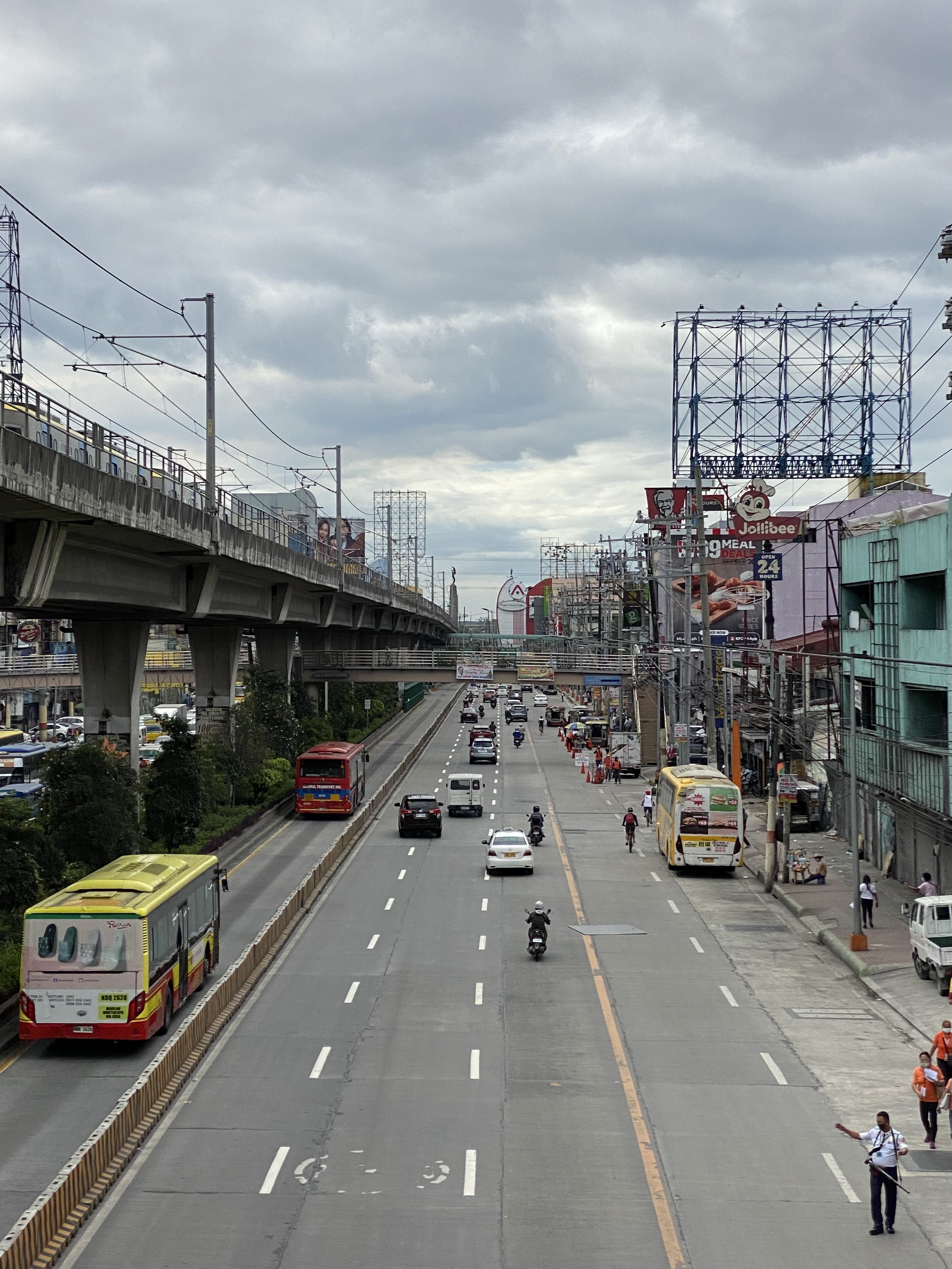
EDSA, a major thoroughfare in Metro Manila, is named after historian and writer Epifanio de los Santos

=== List ===
Street	Location	Named after	Notes
A. Mendoza Street (Calle Andalucía)	Sampaloc, Manila	Alfonso Mendoza	Former assemblyman of Manila. Street formerly known as Andalucia Street.
A. Bonifacio Avenue	Quezon City and Marikina	Andrés Bonifacio	Filipino national hero.
Avenida de Andrés Soriano	Intramuros and Port Area, Manila	Don Andrés Soriano (1898–1964)	Spanish-Filipino businessman, former San Miguel Corporation head and founder of Philippine Airlines. The street was formerly known as Aduana Street.
A. Soriano Street	Ermitaño, San Juan	Andrés Soriano	Sanggunian (local leader) of the Katipunan chapter in San Juan and first municipal president of San Juan. Not to be mistaken for Spanish-Filipino businessman Andrés Soriano.
Adriatico Street (Calle Dakota)	Malate, Manila	Macario Gonzáles Adriático (1869–1919)	Filipino writer, patriot and Philippine Assembly delegate. The street was previously named Dakota Street, after The Dakotas or collectively the U.S. states of North and South Dakota.
Alix Street (Calle Alix)	Sampaloc, Manila	José María Alix	Real Audiencia of Manila magistrate in the 1860s. The street was renamed to Legarda Street, after Benito Legarda (1853–1915), landowner and Malolos Congress vice president (1898–99).
Amorsolo Street	Makati	Fernando Cueto Amorsolo (1892–1972)	Filipino painter.
Arlegui Street (Calle Arlegui)	San Miguel, Manila	Cristóbal Arlegui	Spanish landowner whose brother Joaquin was treasurer of the Manila Cathedral.
Avenida de Antonio Arnáiz	Pasay and Makati	Antonio Arnáiz y Somoza (1912–1979)	Filipino aviation pioneer. The street was previously called Libertad Street and Pasay Road.
Aurora Boulevard	Quezon City	Aurora Quezon (1888–1949)	Filipino first-lady (1935–44).
Calle conde de Avilés	San Miguel, Manila	José Vicente Menéndez de Avilés, 1st count of Avilés	El Conde de Avilé (Count of Avilés) and landowner. The street was later renamed to José Laurel Street after President José P. Laurel (1891–1959).
Avenida Ayala	Makati	Zóbel de Ayala family	Owners of the land on which the avenue was built. The avenue was originally the primary runway of Nielson Field.
Paseo de Azcárraga	Binondo, Santa Cruz and Quiapo, Manila	Marcelo de Azcárraga Palmero (1832–1915)	13th prime minister of Spain (1897–1900) and the only Spanish prime minister of Filipino descent. The street was later renamed to Recto Avenue in 1961, after Filipino senator and nationalist Claro Mayo Recto (1890–1960).
Paseo de Benavides	Binondo and Tondo, Manila	Miguel de Benavides (c. 1552–1605)	Archbishop of Manila (1602–05).
Calzada de Blumentritt	Santa Cruz and Sampaloc, Manila	Ferdinand Blumentritt (1853–1913)	Bohemian professor and author.
Boni Avenue	Mandaluyong	Bonifacio I. Javier (1912–1979)	Filipino World War II guerilla leader and mayor of Mandaluyong (1946–55; 1960–62).
Bonny Serrano Avenue	Quezon City	Boni Serrano	Filipino Korean War colonel and hero.
Avenida de Nicolás Buendía	Makati	Nicolás Buendía (1879–1949)	Filipino senator (1945–46). The street was renamed to Gil Puyat (1907–1981) Avenue after another senator and businessman.
Calle Burke	Binondo, Manila	William J. Burke (1862–1925)	English-born American politician and businessman.
Paseo de Bustillo	Sampaloc, Manila	Fernando Manuel de Bustillo Bustamante y Rueda	Spanish Governor-General of the Philippines (1717–19). The street has been renamed to Figueras Street after José Figueras, secretary of labor (1948–53).
Avenida de Pres. Carlos García	Quezon City	Filipino president (1957–61).	Street within University of the Philippines Diliman campus and is not to be confused with Circumferential Road 5.
Carlos P. Garcia Avenue	Quezon City, Taguig, Parañaque, Las Piñas	Filipino president (1957–61).	Alternative name to Katipunan Avenue in Quezon City. Known as Carlos P. García Avenue Extension in Parañaque and Las Piñas.
Calle Carriedo	Santa Cruz, Manila	Francisco Carriedo y Pedero (1690–1743)	Spanish philanthropist and founder of Carriedo Waterworks (now Metropolitan Waterworks and Sewerage System.)
Chino Roces Avenue	Makati	Joaquín "Chino" Roces (1913–1988)	Filipino businessman and founder of the Manila Times and Associated Broadcasting Company. The street was previously named Pasong Tamó.
Craig Street	Sampaloc, Manila	Austin Craig	American historian who was one of the first biographers of the Philippine national hero, José Rizal.
D. Tuazon Street	Quezon City	Don Demetrio Asunción Tuason y Paz (1870-1927)	Filipino businessman who was the fifth son of hacienda owners Don Jose Severo Tuason y Patiño (1833-1874) and Doña Teresa de la Paz (1841-1890), whose combined estate consisted of the Hacienda de Mariquina and Hacienda de Santa Mesa.
D. Santiago Street	Pedro Cruz, San Juan	Daniel Santiago	Mayor of San Juan from 1939 to 1942.
De la Rosa Street	Makati	Fabián de la Rosa (1869–1937)	Filipino painter.
Calle José Felipe del Pan (formerly Calle Príncipe de Asturias)	San Nicolas, Manila	José Felipe del Pan (1821–1891)	Spanish author and editor of Diario de Manila. The street was formerly known as Principe Street after then Prince of Asturias, Alfonso XIII of Spain.
Avenida de Fray Diego Cera	Las Piñas	Padre Diego Cera de la Virgen del Carmen (1762-1834)	Spanish priest and Bamboo Organ builder.
Don Alejandro Roces Avenue (South Market Street)	Quezon City	Alejandro Roces, Sr.	Filipino educator. This was previously named South Market Street.
Escoda Street (Calle California)	Manila	Josefa Llanes Escoda	Filipina suffragist and founder of the Girl Scouts of the Philippines
Estrella Street	Makati	Máximo Estrella y Bondoc	14th Mayor of Makati from 1956 to 1969.
Eulogio Amang Rodriguez Avenue	Pasig	Eulogio "Amang" Rodríguez	Former two-time Municipal President of Rizal province. Pasig was previously part of Rizal province until it was incorporated into Metro Manila.
Eulogio Rodriguez Jr. Avenue	Pasig and Quezon City	Eulogio Rodríguez Jr.	Son of Eulogio "Amang" Rodriguez and former Representative and Municipal President of Rizal province.
Eulogio Rodriguez Sr. Avenue	Quezon City	Eulogio "Amang" Rodríguez	Formerly known as España Boulevard Extension.
Eugenio Lopez Drive (South 1 Street)	Quezon City	Eugenio López Jr. (1928–1999)	Filipino broadcast pioneer who helped to restore ABS-CBN in 1986 after the People Power Revolution. This portion of the street is alternatively named Scout Albano Street, named after Air Scout Observer Ramón Albano (1947–1963), who was one of the 24 delegates representing the Philippines in the 11th World Scout Jamboree, perished on its way to Greece. This street was previously named South 1 Street.
Calle Echagüe	Quiapo	Rafaél de Echagüe y Bermingham	Spanish Governor-General of the Philippines (1862–65). The street was renamed to C. Palanca Street after Carlos Palanca Sr., the first Chinese consul to the Philippines (1899) whose birth name was Tan Quien Sien.
Epifanio de los Santos Avenue (EDSA) (Avenida Primo de Rivera)	Caloocan, Quezon City, San Juan, Mandaluyong, Makati and Pasay	Epifanio de los Santos (1871–1928)	Filipino historian and writer.
Einstein Street	Makati and Manila	Albert Einstein (1879–1955)	German-born theoretical physicist, developer of the general theory of relativity.
Felipe Agoncillo Street (Calle Colorado)	Manila	Felipe Agoncillo (1859–1941)	Lawyer, Representative to the First Philippine Republic in the Treaty of Paris (1898), Member of the Philippine Assembly from Batangas's 1st District. The street was previously named Colorado Street, after the U.S. state of Colorado.
Calle de Félix Roxas	Caloocan and Manila	Félix Roxas y Arroyo (1820–1890)	Filipino architect, and a prominent member of the Roxas family who designed churches in Intramuros like San Ignacio and the original Sto. Domingo Church.
Calle de Folgueras	San Nicolas, Manila	Mariano Fernández de Folgueras	Spanish governor-general of the Philippines (1806–10). Renamed Carmen Planas Street after the first woman councillor of Manila.
G. Masangkay Street	Binondo and Tondo, Manila	Brig. Gen. Guillermo Masangkay	Katipunan member of the Supreme Council (1894).
Galileo Street	Makati	Galileo Galilei	Italian physicist, mathematician, astronomer, and philosopher
Calle de Sánchez Gaztambide	Sampaloc, Manila	Joaquín Sánchez Gaztambide	Spanish zarzuela composer.
General Luis Street	Novaliches, Quezon City, Caloocan and Valenzuela	General Luis Malinis	Renamed after one of Andrés Bonifacio's most trusted revolutionaries, General Luis Malinis, who was killed during the Battle of Novaliches in November 1896 along this road.
General Kalentong Street (Calle Vicente Leyba)	Mandaluyong	Vicente Leyba (alias Kalentong)	Katipunan general who fought during the Philippine Revolution.
Gilmore Avenue (Avenida Gilmore)	Mariana, Quezon City	Eugene Allen Gilmore	American governor-general of the Philippines (1927, 1929).
Gil Fernando Avenue	Marikina	Gil Estanislao Fernando	Mayor of Marikina (1947–1951; 1956–1959)
Gregorio Araneta Avenue	Quezon City and San Juan City	Gregorio Soriano Araneta	Filipino lawyer, businessman, nationalist and patriot, who served his country and people during the Spanish colonization and American occupation.
H.V. de la Costa Street	Makati	Horacio de la Costa	Filipino writer and historian.
Harrison Avenue (Avenida de F.B. Harrison)	Pasay	Francis Burton Harrison	American statesman and governor-general of the Philippines (1913–21).
Doña Hemady Avenue	Mariana, Quezon City	Doña Magdalena Hashim Ysmael de Hemady (born Wadi'ah Hashim)	Lebanese immigrant who established the New Manila subdivisions and became the first real-estate developer in the Philippines.
Calle Herrán	Ermita, Paco and Santa Ana, Manila	José de la Herrán	Spanish naval captain and merchant. The Ermita-Paco portion of the street has been renamed to Pedro Gil Street, after the Filipino legislator, Pedro Gil.
Hidalgo Street (Calle San Sebastián)	Quiapo	Félix Resurrección Hidalgo	Filipino painter who won the silver medal in the 1884 Madrid Exposition of Fine Arts along with Juan Luna. The street was previously called San Sebastian Street.
Calle Isaac Peral	Ermita and Paco	Isaac Peral	Spanish naval engineer. Renamed United Nations Avenue.
J. Nakpil Street (Calle Vermont)	Malate, Manila	Julio Nakpíl	Filipino composer. The street was previously named Vermont Street after the U.S. state.
Jorge Bocobo Street (Calle Nebraska)	Ermita and Malate	Jorge Bocobo	Supreme Court associate justice (1942–44). The street was previously called Nebraska Street after the U.S. state of Nebraska.
Jose W. Diokno Boulevard	Pasay	José Wright "Ka Pepe" Diokno (1922–1987)	Filipino senator and national hero.
Senator Jose O. Vera Street (Granada Street)	Quezon City	José O. Vera	Filipino senator and founder of Sampaguita Pictures. The street was formerly called Granada Street.
J. Ruiz Street	San Juan	Juan Ruiz	Katipunan hero of the Battle of Pinaglabanan.
Avenida de Julia Vargas	Mandaluyong and Pasig	Julia Vargas y Camus	Realtor and wife of Ortigas & Company Limited Partnership founder Francisco Ortigas y Barcinas.
Kalaw Avenue (Calle San Luís)	Ermita, Manila	Teodoro Kalaw	Historian and National Assembly legislator. The avenue was formerly called San Luis Street.
Katipunan Avenue	Quezon City	The Katipunan	Named after the Katipunan movement, whose members traversed the once-fortested area where the road now lies to travel to the areas of Banlat, Balintawak and Pugad Lawin.
Lacson Avenue (Gov. W. C. Forbes)	Sampaloc, Manila	Arsenio Lacson, William Cameron Forbes	Named after Manila mayor Arsenio Lacson (1952–1962). Formerly named after American governor-general of the Philippines (1908–1913).
Lawton Avenue (Avenida H. W. Lawton)	Taguig and Pasay	Henry Ware Lawton	U.S. Army general during the Philippine–American War.
Leon Guinto Street (Calle Pennsylvania)	Ermita and Malate, Manila	León G. Guinto, Sr.	Manila mayor (1942–45). The street was formerly known as Pennsylvania Street, after the U.S. state of Pennsylvania.
Lerma Street	Sampaloc, Manila	Juana Lerma	Landowner and grandmother of Benito Legarda.
Luna Mencias Street	Mandaluyong	Antonio Luna (1866–1899) and Bonifacio Mencias (1888–1944)	The entire street was originally named A. Luna Street after Philippine Revolutionary Army general Antonio Luna until the northern section was partially renamed after Dr. Bonifacio Mencias, a physician who sympathized with guerrilla fighters in World War II.
Macapagal Boulevard	Pasay and Parañaque	Diosdado Macapagal	Filipino president (1961–65).
MacArthur Highway	Caloocan, Malabon and Valenzuela	Douglas MacArthur	U.S. Army general during World War II.
Maria Orosa Avenue (Calle Flórida)	Ermita and Malate, Manila	María Orosa	Maria Orosa e Ylagan (1893–1945) was a Filipino food technologist, pharmaceutical chemist, humanitarian and war heroine. Formerly named after the U.S. state of Florida.
Mariano Marcos Street (Ortega Street)	Maytunas and Kabayanan, San Juan	Mariano Marcos	Politician, father of Philippine president and dictator Ferdinand Marcos.
Marcos Highway (Marikina-Infanta Highway)	Marikina	Ferdinand Emmanuel Edralin Marcos Sr.	Filipino president (1965–86).
Marcos Road	Port Area, Intramuros, San Nicolas, Tondo	Ferdinand Emmanuel Edralin Marcos Sr.	Filipino president (1965–86). The road was renamed to Mel Lopez Boulevard, after former Manila Mayor Mel Lopez.
M.A. Reyes Street	Little Baguio, San Juan	Máximo Reyes	Appointed municipal president of San Juan from 1933 to 1934.
McKinley Road	Makati and Taguig	William McKinley	U.S. president (1897–1901).
Calle de Manuel Earnshaw	Sampaloc	Manuel Earnshaw	Resident Commissioner of the Philippines
Melba Street (Calle Melba)	Santa Cruz, Manila	Nellie Melba	Australian opera singer who visited Manila and performed at the Manila Grand Opera House located along the street. Renamed Doroteo Jose Street after a Filipino patriot.
Calle Mendiola	San Miguel, Manila	Enrique Mendiola	Educator and Spanish-language textbook author who became one of the first Filipinos appointed to the University of the Philippines Board of Regents.
Mother Ignacia Avenue	South Triangle and Paligsahan, Quezon City	Ignacia del Espíritu Santo	Catholic religious sister and founder of the Religious of the Virgin Mary.
Morales Street	Salapan, San Juan	Raymundo Morales	Grandfather of San Juan vice mayor Luis Artiaga. Most of the street was absorbed into Aurora Boulevard.
Calle Morayta	Sampaloc, Manila	Miguel Morayta Sagrario	Spanish republican politician, founder of Grande Oriente Español, La solidaridad member and José Rizal's history professor at the Complutense University of Madrid. Later renamed Nicanor Reyes Street after the first president of Far Eastern University located along the street.
Calle de Morga	Tondo, Manila	Antonio de Morga	Spanish historian and publisher of Sucesos de las Islas Filipinas (1609). Later renamed to Tayuman Street.
Newton Street	Makati	Isaac Newton	English physicist, mathematician, alchemist, and philosopher (1642–1727). Neighbouring streets are also named after famous scientists, including Galileo and Einstein.
N. Domingo Street	San Juan and Quezon City	Nicolás Domingo	Relator (court reporter) of the Real Audiencia of Manila in 1898.
N.S. Amoranto Sr. Avenue (Calle Retiro)	Quezon City	Norberto S. Amoranto	The first elected and 5th Mayor of Quezon City (1954-1976).
Calle marqués de Novaliches	San Miguel, Manila	Manuel Pavia y Lacy	Spanish Governor-General of the Philippines (1854) and first Marquis of Novaliches. Renamed Nicanor Padilla Street in 1950 after Filipino pioneer physician and patriot.
Calle Nozaleda	Paco, Manila	Bernardino Nozaleda y Villa	Archbishop of Manila (1889–1902). Later renamed Gen. Luna Street after Filipino general Antonio Luna.
Ongpin Street (Calle Ongpin)	Binondo, Manila	Román Ongpin	Filipino-Chinese businessman and philanthropist who aided Filipino revolutionaries against the Spanish and American colonial administration in the Philippine islands
Osmeña Highway	Manila and Makati (Note: The name held by the untolled Osmeña Highway also applies alternatively to the tolled South Luzon Expressway's segments traversing Makati, Pasay, Taguig, Parañaque and Muntinlupa in Metro Manila, as well as San Pedro, Laguna.)	Sergio Osmeña	Filipino president (1944–46).
Ortigas Avenue	San Juan, Mandaluyong and Pasig	Francisco Ortigas y Barcinas	Filipino lawyer and realtor; founder of Ortigas & Company Limited Partnership.
Calle de Gob. Otis	Paco, Manila	Elwell Stephen Otis	American military governor of the Philippines (1898–1900). Renamed Maria Paz Mendoza Guazon Street after a Filipino educator and civic leader.
P. Tuazon Boulevard	Quezon City	Pedro Tuazon	Supreme Court of the Philippines justice (1948–54).
Paz Mendoza Guazon Street	Paco, Manila	Paz Mendoza Guazon	Filipina physician
Padre Burgos Avenue (Calle Padre Burgos)	Ermita, Manila	José Burgos	Spanish-Filipino secular priest and martyr.
Padre Faura Street (Calle Observatorio)	Ermita, Manila	Federico Faura	Spanish scholastic of the Observatorio Meteorológico de Manila. Previously named Observatorio Street.
Paseo de Roxas	Makati	Domingo Róxas y Ureta	Filipino-Mexican businessman and founder of Ayala Corporation. This avenue was originally the secondary runway of Nielson Field.
Pedro Guevarra Street	San Juan	Pedro Guevara	Filipino legislator and resident commissioner to the U.S. (1923–37).
Pi y Margal Street (also spelled as Piy Margal Street)	Sampaloc, Manila	Francesc Pi i Margall (Francisco Pi y Margal)	2nd President of the First Spanish Republic and of the Spanish Republic, and a known Catalan federalist politician.
Quezon Avenue (Avenida Quezón)	Quezon City	Manuel Luis Quezon	Filipino president (1935–44).
Quirino Highway	Quezon City, Caloocan, San Jose del Monte and Norzagaray in Bulacan	Elpidio Quirino	The sixth president of the Philippines (1948–53). He died at his retirement house in Novaliches along this road.
Ramon Papa Street	Tondo, Manila	Ramón Papa	Manila City councilor (1912), Philippine Independence Mission delegate, doctor and soldier.
Raon Street (Calle Raón)	Quiapo, Manila	José Antonio Raón y Gutiérrez	Spanish governor-general of the Philippines (1765–70). The street was renamed in the late 19th century to Centeno Street, after Manila civil governor Jose Centeno. In the 1960s, it was again renamed to Gonzalo Puyat Street after the Filipino businessman and father of Senator Gil Puyat.
Reina Regente Street (Calle Reina Regente/Paseo de Maria Cristina)	Binondo, Manila	Maria Christina of Austria	Queen consort (1879–85) and queen regent (1885–1902) (Spanish: Reina regente) of Spain.
Rizal Avenue (Paseo de Salcedo)	Santa Cruz, Tondo and Caloocan	José Rizal	Filipino national hero.
F. Roman Street	Salapan and Balong-Bato, San Juan	Fr. Román Pérez, OFM	Spanish Franciscan cura párroco (parish priest) of San Juan Bautista Church (renamed Pinaglabanan Church).
Roosevelt Avenue (Avenida Roosevelt, later renamed to Fernando Poe Jr. Avenue)	Quezon City	Franklin Delano Roosevelt, Ronald Allan Kelley Poe	American President of the United States (1933–45) who approved the Tydings–McDuffie Act during his tenure. Later renamed to Fernando Poe Jr. Avenue after a famous actor, National Artist and one-time presidential candidate.
Roxas Boulevard (Malecón Almirante Dewey)	Ermita and Malate, Manila, Pasay, and Parañaque	Manuel Roxas, George Dewey	Filipino president (1946–48). The road was originally known as Cavite Boulevard, named after the neighboring Cavite province. Later renamed to Dewey Boulevard during the American period after U.S. Navy admiral George Dewey. Also briefly known as Heiwa Boulevard during the Japanese occupation.
Sande Street (Paseo de Sande)	Tondo, Manila	Francisco de Sande	Spanish governor-general of the Philippines (1575–80). Later renamed N. Zamora Street after Nicolas Zamora, founder of Iglesia Evangelica Metodista en las Islas Filipinas.
Shaw Boulevard	Mandaluyong and Pasig	William James Shaw	American founder of the Wack Wack Golf and Country Club located on the boulevard. Formerly named Jose Rizal Boulevard.
Soler Street (Calle Soler)	Binondo, Manila	Sebastián Vidal y Soler	Spanish botanist and director of Jardin Botanico de Manila (now Mehan Garden) from 1878–89.
Sumulong Highway	Marikina	Juan Sumulong	Filipino politician and president of Partido Democrata (1919–23).
Susano Road	Caloocan and Quezon City	Don Tomás Susano	3rd Mayor of Caloocan (1906–08)
Tandang Sora Avenue	Quezon City	Melchora Aquino	Named after the Mother of Philippine Revolution. Aid and help Katipuneros during Spanish occupation of the Philippines.
Taft Avenue (Avenida Taft; Avenida Columbia)	Ermita, and Malate, Manila and Pasay	William Howard Taft	U.S. president and governor-general of the Philippines (1901–03). Previously called Columbia Avenue.
Tomas Claudio Boulevard	Pandacan, Manila	Tomás Mateo Claudio	Filipino World War I hero.
Tomas Morato Avenue (Avenida Tomás Morato)	Quezon City	Tomás Eduardo Morato y Bernabeu	Spanish-born mayor of Quezon City (1939–42). This was formerly called Sampaloc Avenue up until the 1960s.
Tomas Pinpin Street (Calle San Jacinto)	Binondo, Manila	Tomás Pinpin	Named after a Filipino writer and publisher. Formerly known as San Jacinto Street.
V. Cruz Street	Maytunas and Santa Lucia, San Juan	Venancio P. Cruz	Pangulo (president) of the Sangguniang Balangay of the Katipunan chapter in San Juan.
V.P. Ibañez Street	Little Baguio, San Juan	Valentín Ibáñez	Municipal president of San Juan from 1928 to 1931.
Victorino Mapa Street	Santa Mesa, Manila	Victorino Mapa	Supreme Court of the Philippines Chief Justice (1920–21).
V.A. Rufino Street (Calle Herrera)	Makati	Vicente A. Rufino	Filipino businessman whose family owns Rufino Pacific Tower located along the street. It was previously called Herrera Street.
Villalobos Street (Paseo de Villalobos)	Quiapo, Manila	Ruy López de Villalobos	16th century Spanish navigator who named the islands after the Spanish king Philip II.
Vito Cruz Street (Calle Vito Cruz)	Malate and San Andres, Manila and Makati	Hermogenes Vito Cruz	Alcalde mayor of Pineda (now Pasay) from 1870–71. The street was renamed in 1989 to Pablo Ocampo Street, after Pablo de Leon Ocampo, Second Secretary of the Malolos Congress.
Zobel Roxas Street (Calle Zóbel-Róxas)	Makati, Manila and Pasay	Jacobo Zóbel y Roxas	Filipino businessman and member of the influential Zobel de Ayala family.
Zurbaran Street (Paseo de Zurbarán)	Santa Cruz, Manila	Francisco de Zurbarán	Spanish painter. The street was renamed Valeriano Fugoso Street after a Manila mayor.

== Squares and plazas ==
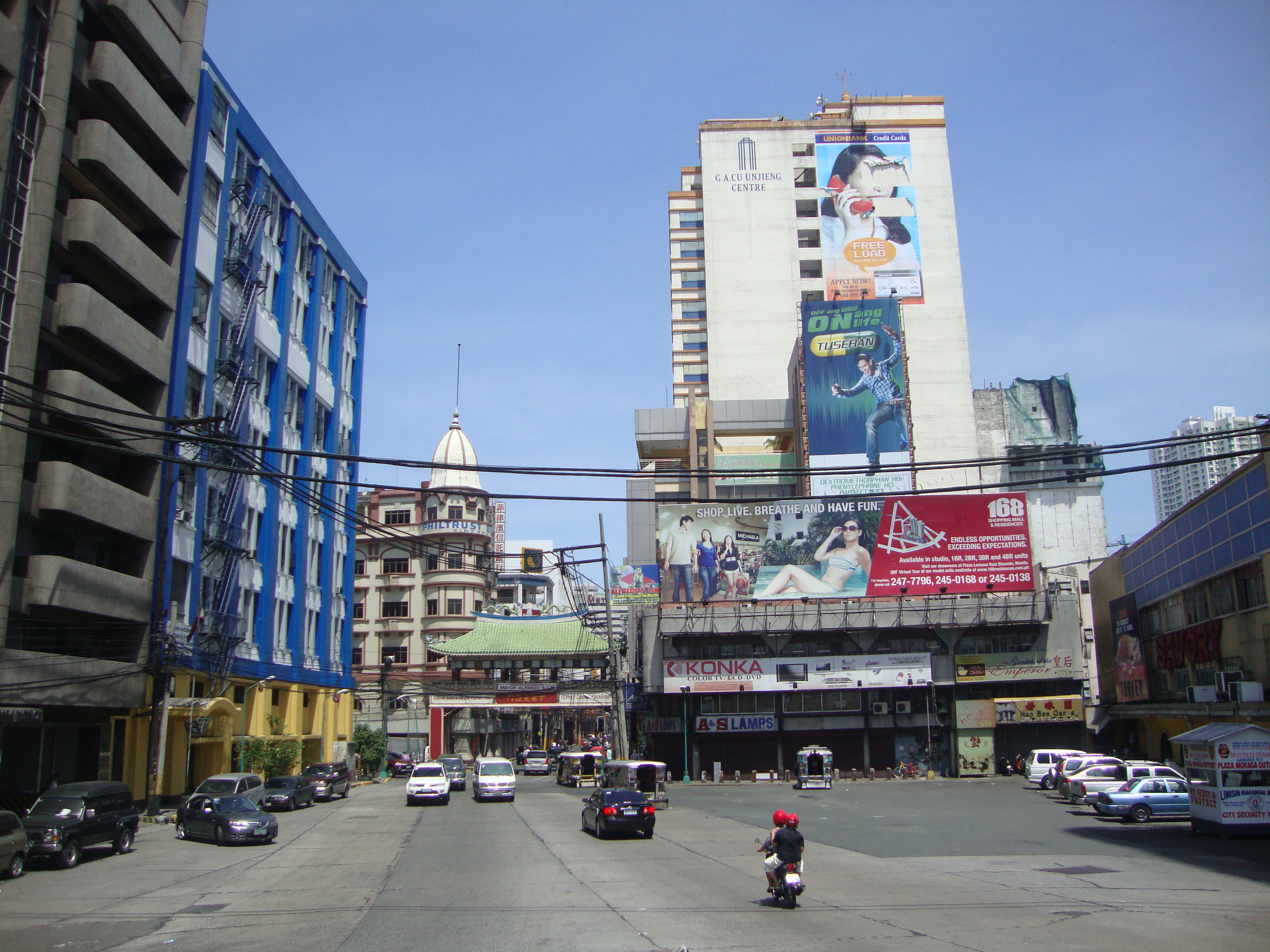
Plaza Moraga in Binondo, Manila, is named after the first parish priest of Santa Ana de Sapa.

Square	Location	Named after	Notes
Plaza Avanceña	Quiapo	Ramón Avanceña	Supreme Court of the Philippines chief justice (1925-1941).
Plaza Avelino	Sampaloc	Librada Avelino	Centro Escolar University founder.
Plaza Calderón de la Barca	Binondo	Pedro Calderón de la Barca	Spanish playwright. The plaza is now known as Plaza San Lorenzo Ruiz after the first Filipino saint, Lorenzo Ruiz.
Plaza Cervantes	Binondo	Miguel de Cervantes	Spanish novelist and author of Don Quijote de la Mancha (1605).
Plaza del Conde	San Nicolas	Antonio Chacón y Conde	Spanish commander of the Veteran Battalion of the Philippines (1825) and author of the Great Days in the Philippines published in 1826.
Plaza Felipe Calderón	Santa Ana	Felipe Calderón y Roca	Filipino lawyer and author of the Malolos Constitution (1899).
Plaza Ferguson	Ermita	Arthur M. Ferguson	U.S. Army lieutenant colonel during the Philippine–American War (1898-1902). The plaza is also known as Plaza Nuestra Señora de Guia.
Plaza Goiti	Santa Cruz	Martín de Goiti	Spanish conquistador of Manila. The plaza is now known as Plaza Lacson after Manila mayor Arsenio Lacson.
Plaza Lachambre	Binondo	José de Lachambre	Spanish interim governor-general of the Philippines (1897).
Plaza Miranda	Quiapo	José Sandino y Miranda	Spanish secretary of the Treasury of the Philippines (Spanish: Tesoro de Filipinas) (1853-1854).
Plaza Moraga	Binondo	Fernando de Moraga	The first parish priest of Santa Ana de Sapa (1605).
Plaza Moriones	Intramuros	Domingo Moriones y Muralla	Spanish governor-general of the Philippines (1877-1880).
Plaza Moriones	Tondo	Domingo Moriones y Muralla	Spanish governor-general of the Philippines (1877-1880).
Plaza Olivia Salamanca	Ermita	Olivia Salamanca	One of the first Filipino women doctors.
Plaza Rajah Sulayman	Malate	Rajah Sulayman	Pre-Hispanic ruler of the Kingdom of Maynila (1571-1575).
Plaza Rueda	Ermita	Salvador Rueda y Santos	Spanish poet who visited Manila in 1915.
Plaza Vicente del Fierro (Plaza Herández)	Tondo	Vicente del Fierro	Filipino writer and journalist. The plaza was formerly known as Plaza Hernandez after Filipino labor leader Amado Hernández.
