= CNHS =

CNHS may refer to:

- Cardinal Newman High School (Bellshill), a North Lanarkshire, Scotland high school.
- Cardinal Newman High School (Columbia, South Carolina), a South Carolina, USA high school.
- Cardinal Newman High School (Santa Rosa, California), a California, USA high school.
- Cardinal Newman High School (West Palm Beach, Florida), a Florida, USA high school.
- Central Newcastle High School, a Newcastle upon Tyne, UK independent girls' school.
- Central Noble High School (Albion, Indiana), an Indiana, USA high school.
- Cavite National High School, a Philippine National High School
- Colts Neck High School, a New Jersey, USA high school.
- Clovis North High School (Fresno, California), a California, USA high school.
