= United Nations station (LRT) =

Train station in Manila, Philippines

Coordinates: 14°34′56.97″N 120°59′04.78″E

United Nations	GL14
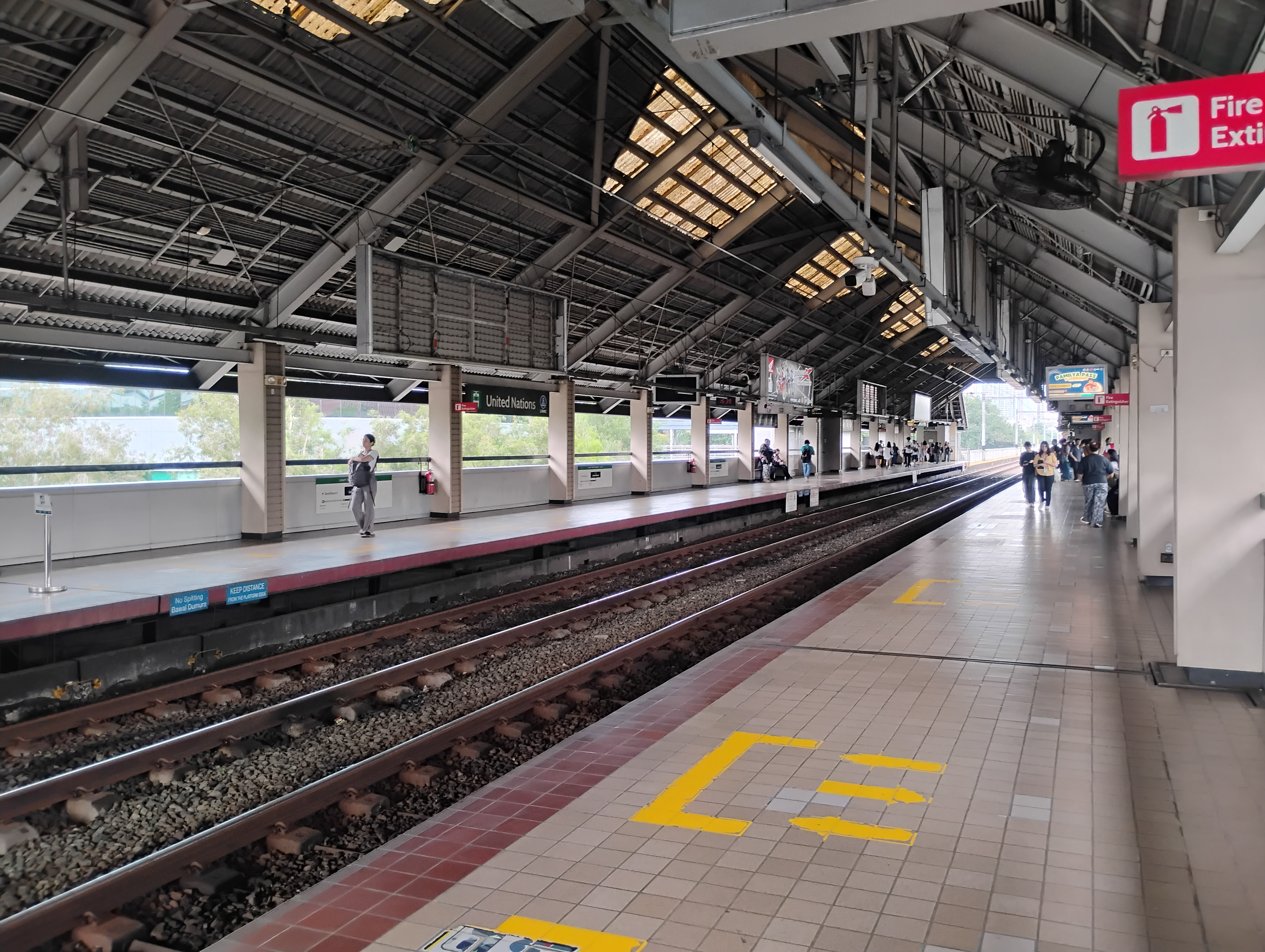

General information
- Other names: U.N. Avenue
- Location: Taft Avenue, Ermita; Manila, Metro Manila, Philippines
- Owner: Department of Transportation; Light Rail Manila Corporation
- Line: LRT Line 1
- Platforms: 2 (2 side)
- Tracks: 2

Construction
- Structure type: Elevated
- Parking: Yes (Times Plaza & The Pearl Manila)

History
- Opened: December 1, 1984; 41 years ago

Services
Preceding station	Manila LRT	Following station
Central towards Fernando Poe Jr.	LRT Line 1	Pedro Gil towards Dr. Santos
Track layout
Location
- Location within Manila Location within Metro Manila Location within Luzon Location within Philippines

United Nations station is an elevated Light Rail Transit (LRT) station located on the LRT Line 1 (LRT-1) system in Ermita, Manila. Situated above the intersection of Taft Avenue and United Nations Avenue, the station is named after the latter.

United Nations station is the thirteenth stop from both Dr. Santos and Fernando Poe Jr. stations, thus becoming the center of the entire line.

== History ==
United Nations station was opened to the public on December 1, 1984, as part of LRT's inaugural southern section, known as the Taft Line.

== Nearby landmarks ==
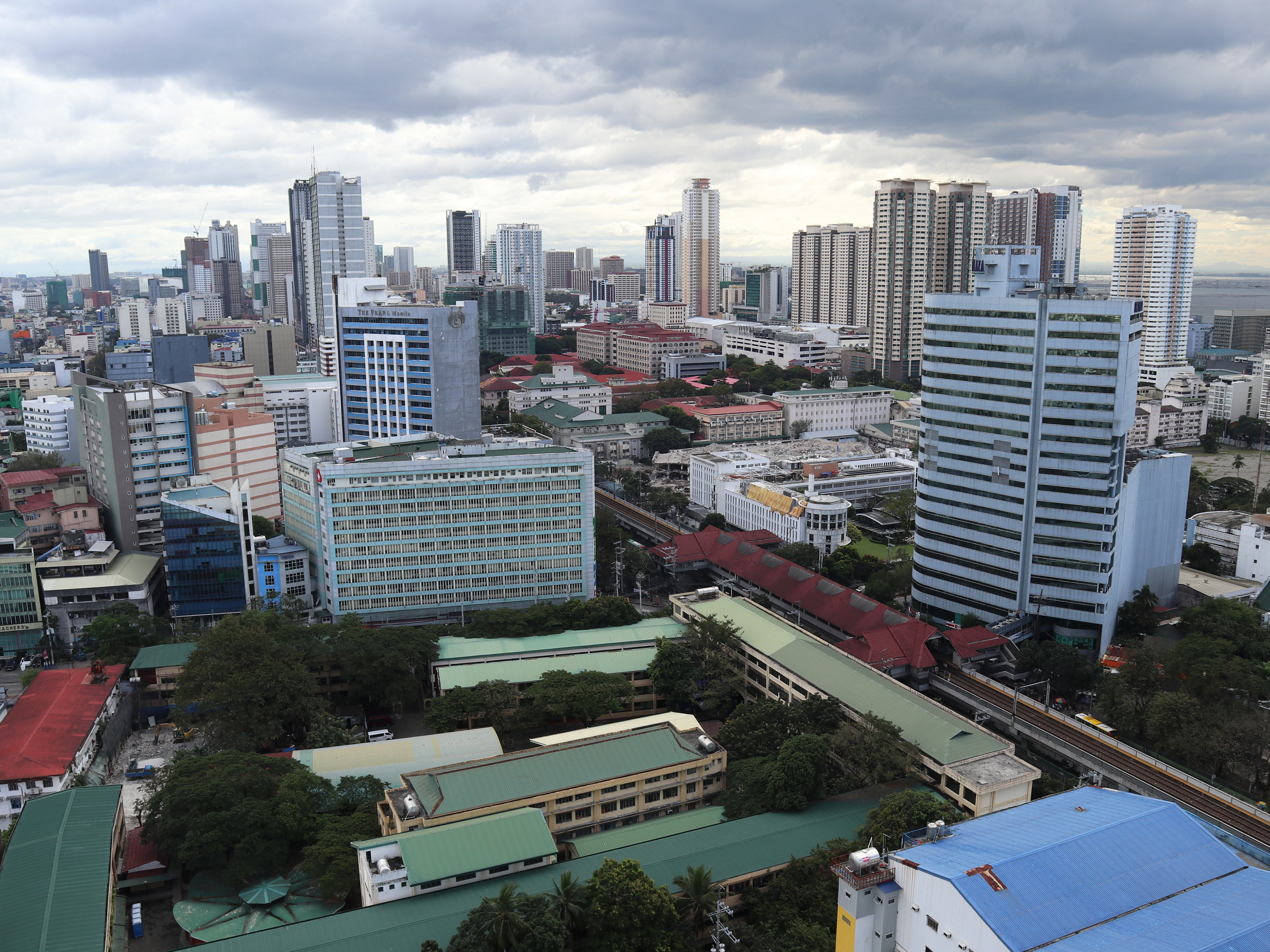
Aerial view of United Nations station and surrounding landmarks

United Nations station is also near educational institutions such as the Technological University of the Philippines, the Philippine Normal University, Adamson University, Santa Isabel College Manila, Emilio Aguinaldo College, Araullo High School and Manila Science High School. It is convenient to several tourist destinations including Rizal Park, National Library of the Philippines, the National Museum of Fine Arts, the National Museum of Anthropology, and the National Museum of Natural History. It is also adjacent to the interconnecting Times Plaza, Philtrust Bank Main Office, PPL Building, World Health Organization Western Pacific Region office, National Bureau of Investigation headquarters, Medical Center Manila, Manila Prince Hotel, Manila Doctors Hospital, U.N. Square, and Waterfront Manila Pavilion Hotel and Casino. It is also near public squares such as Plaza Salamanca and Plaza Rueda, as well as Paco Park. The station was also adjacent to the now-defunct Philam Life Building.

== Transportation links ==
United Nations station is served by buses, jeepneys, and UV Express along Taft Avenue and other nearby routes. Regular taxis, cycle rickshaws, tricycles, and e-tricycles also stop at and near the station.

== Gallery ==
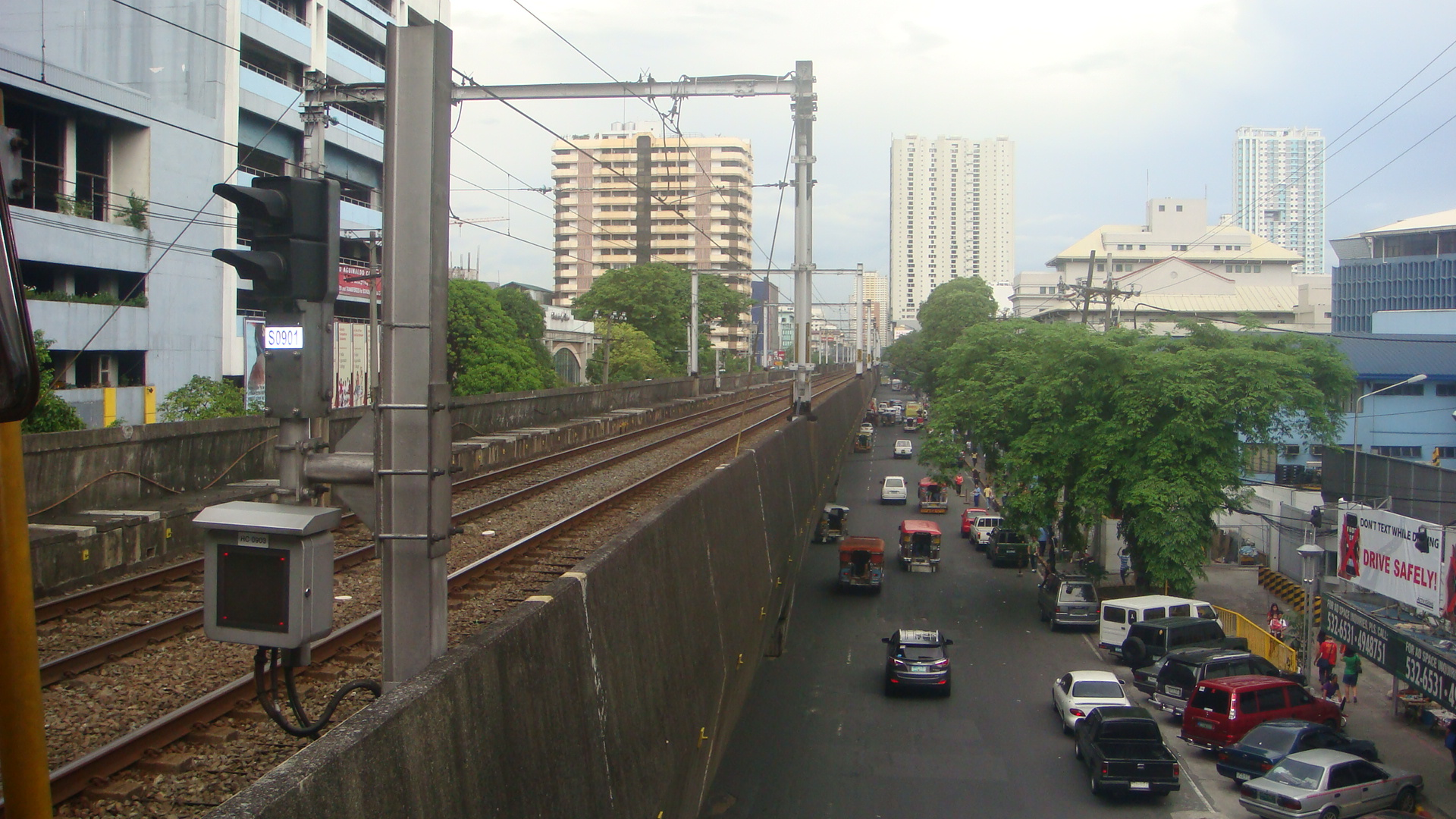
Overview of the area south of United Nations station

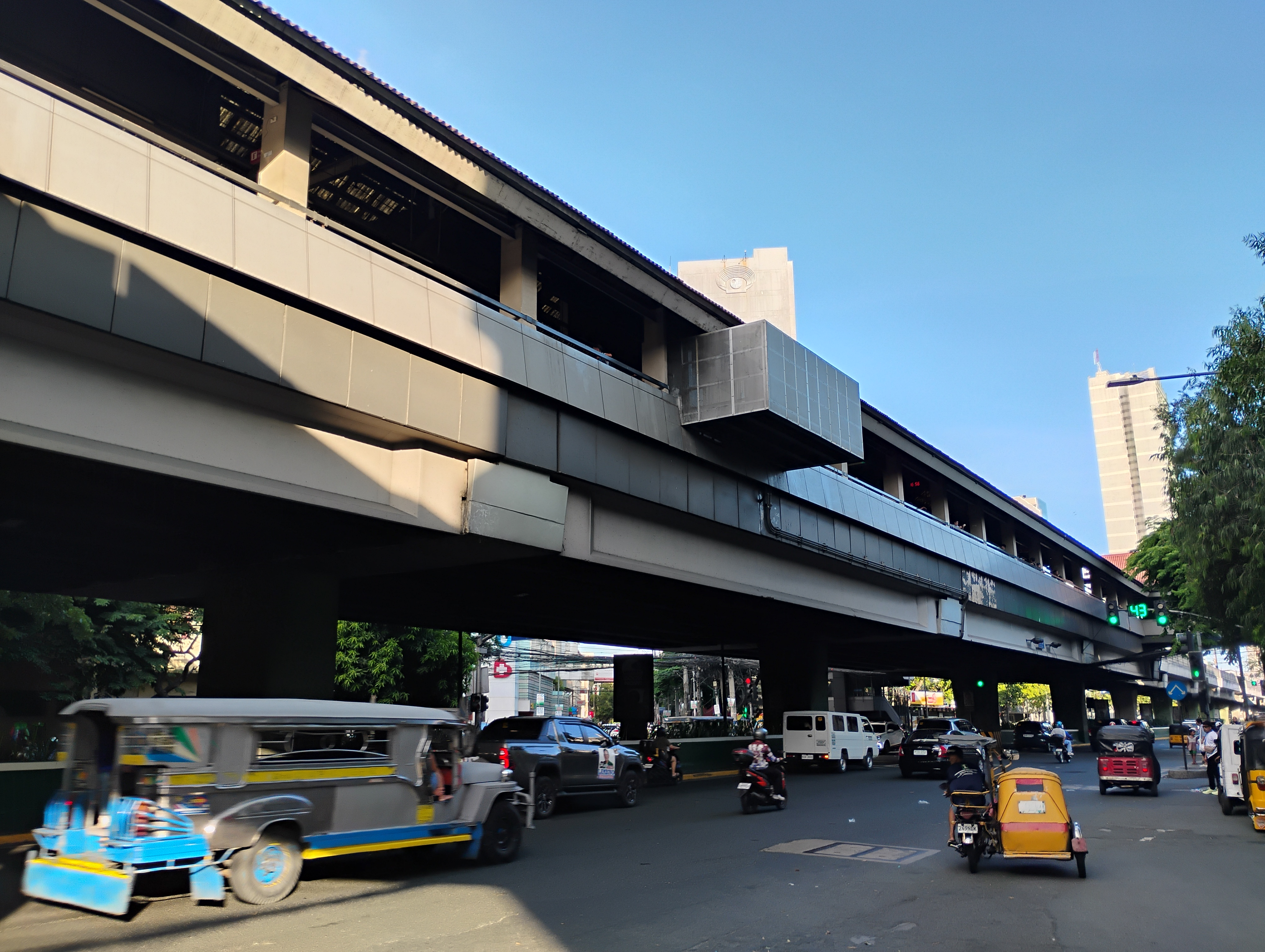
Street view

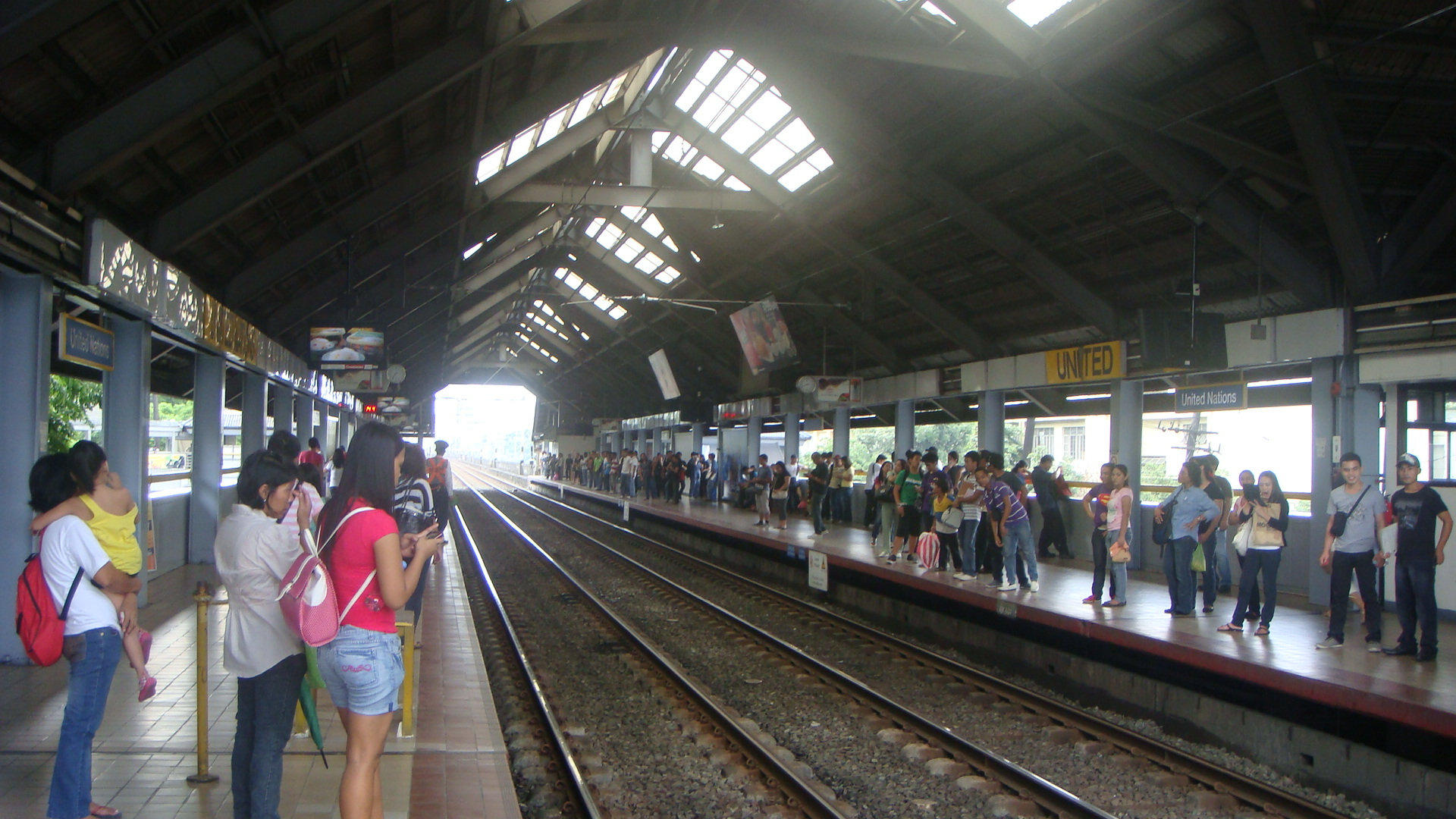
Platform area, panoramic view

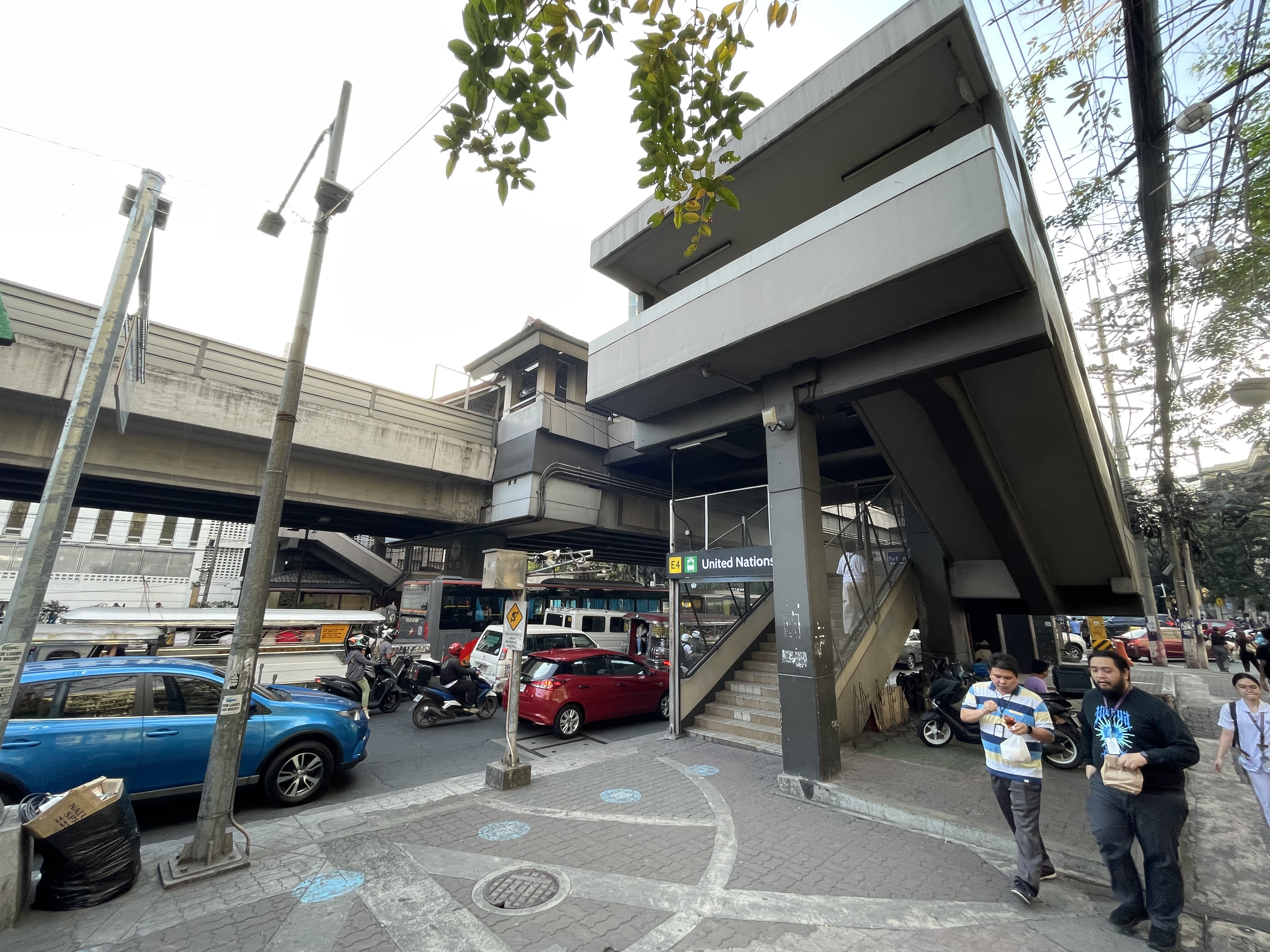
Northbound entrance from Plaza Rueda

== See also ==
- List of rail transit stations in Metro Manila
- Manila Light Rail Transit System
- Media related to United Nations station at Wikimedia Commons
