= Plaza Rueda =

Public square in Ermita, Manila, Philippines

- Public square
- {{{other_names}}}
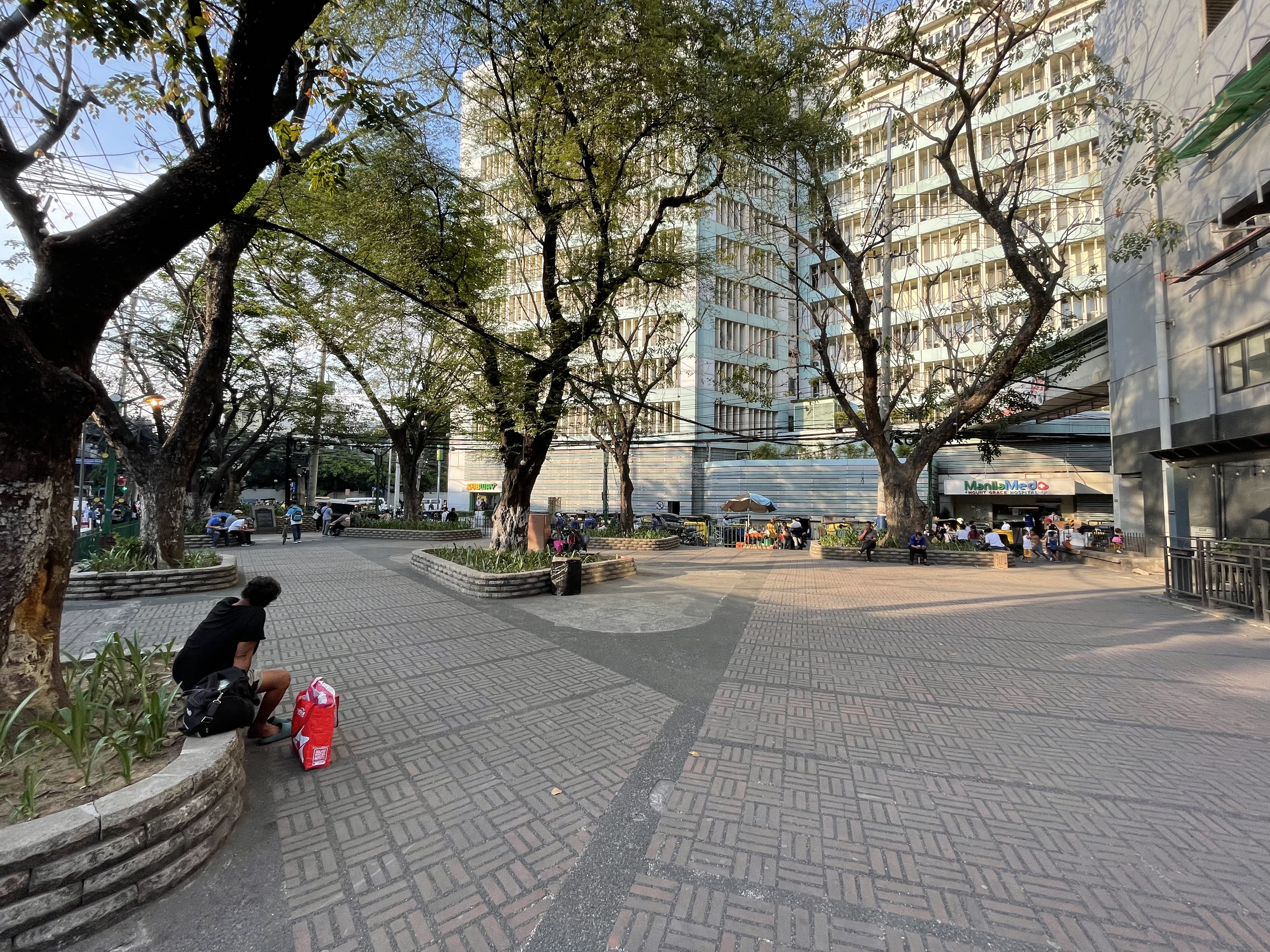
- The square in 2026
- Dedicated to: Salvador Rueda
- Owner: City of Manila
- Location: Taft Avenue cor. United Nations Avenue and General Luna Street, Ermita; Manila, Philippines
- Interactive map of Plaza Rueda
- Coordinates: 14°34′55.7″N 120°59′06.6″E

Plaza Rueda is a public square in Ermita, Manila, bounded by Taft Avenue to the west, United Nations Avenue to the north and General Luna Street to the east.

Originally a low, swampy ground, the plaza was established by the Municipal Board of Manila, known today as the Manila City Council, on November 15, 1915, and dedicated to Spanish journalist and poet Salvador Rueda, who visited the Philippines that year.

== Renovations ==
Once an open space, Plaza Rueda has been renovated three times. New benches, landscaping and light fixtures were installed in the plaza's first renovation, part of a wider redevelopment of public spaces during the tenure of Mayor Lito Atienza. The renovated plaza was inaugurated on June 24, 2006 as part of celebrations for the city's 435th founding anniversary.

The plaza was renovated again in 2014, during the tenure of Mayor Joseph Estrada. Neglected during the tenure of his predecessor, Alfredo Lim, the second renovation entailed the installation of new light fixtures, benches and a perimeter fence, as well as landscaping. The renovation came at no cost to the city government, as it was sponsored by the nearby Medical Center Manila through the city's public-private partnership program. The hospital partnered again with the city for its 52nd anniversary to renovate the plaza a third time during the tenure of Estrada's successor, Isko Moreno, which included improved landscaping, newly-painted fences and pavement improvements, as well as the installation of capiz shell light fixtures. Again coming at no cost to the city government, the renovated plaza was inaugurated on August 15, 2019.

Despite the renovations, a 2017 academic study found that Plaza Rueda had some of the lowest number of trees planted among urban spaces in the City of Manila, with only 11 trees planted, equaling a vegetated area of only 56 square meters (600 sq ft) compared to a total area of 1,083 square meters (11,660 sq ft).

== Use and surrounding structures ==
Plaza Rueda serves as a venue for events and projects, particularly medical missions and wellness talks sponsored by Medical Center Manila. The plaza is also a freedom park along with Plaza Olivia Salamanca on the other side of Taft Avenue, where protests and rallies may be held without requiring permission from local authorities.

An entrance to the northbound platform of United Nations station on Line 1 of the Manila LRT and the northbound United Nations Avenue bus stop are located beside the plaza. Other notable buildings and structures surrounding the plaza include the Cathedral of Praise, Manila Science High School, Emilio Aguinaldo College and the Pearl Manila Hotel.

== See also ==
- List of parks in Manila
- List of city squares
