= Plaza Olivia Salamanca =

Public square in Ermita, Manila, Philippines

- Public square
- {{{other_names}}}
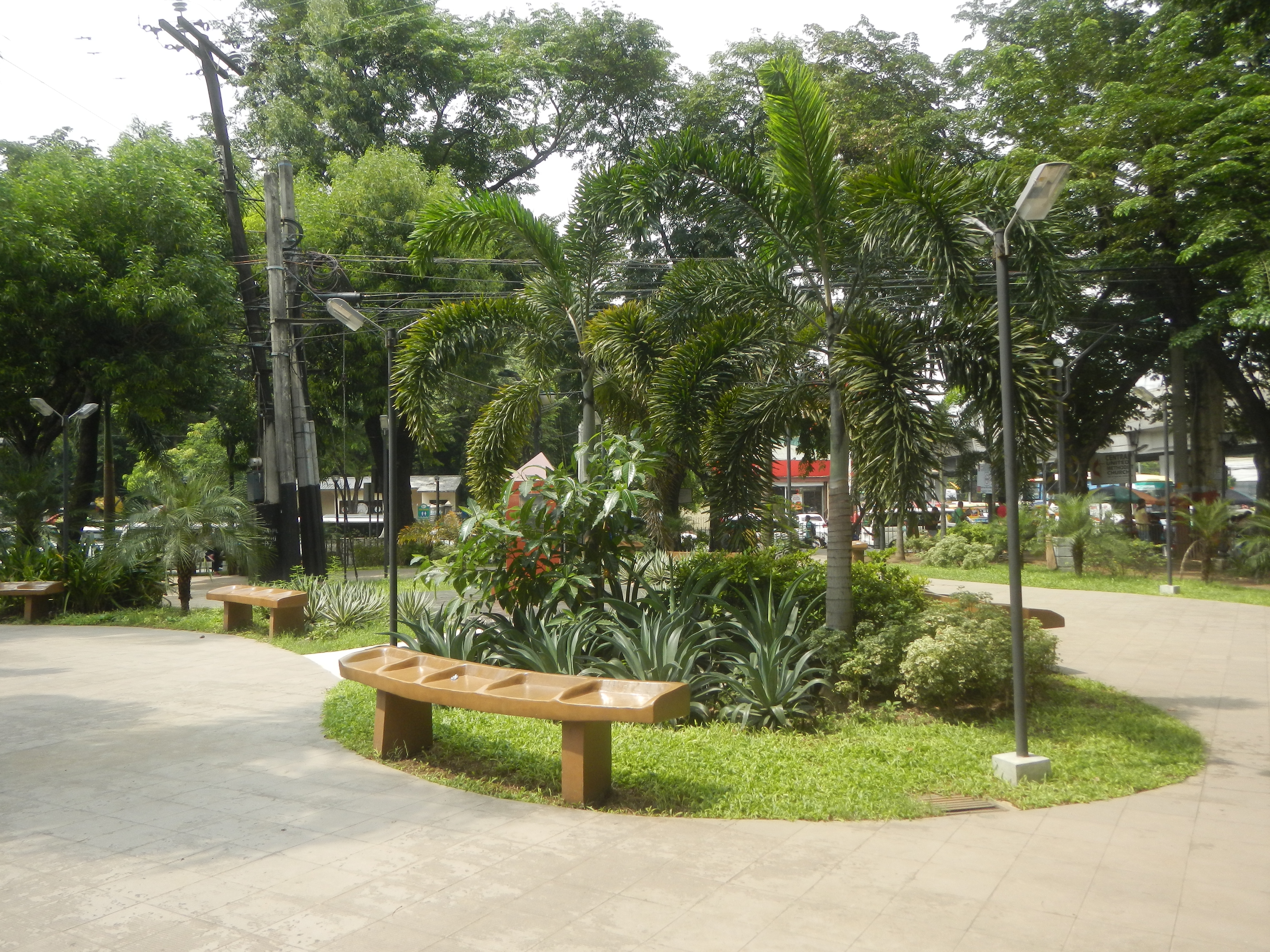
- Dedicated to: Olivia Salamanca
- Owner: City of Manila
- Location: Taft Avenue cor. Teodoro M. Kalaw Avenue and General Luna Street, Ermita; Manila, Philippines
- Interactive map of Plaza Olivia Salamanca
- Coordinates: 14°34′59.5″N 120°59′02.2″E

Plaza Olivia Salamanca (Filipino: Liwasang Olivia Salamanca), also known simply as Plaza Salamanca, is a public square in Ermita, Manila, bounded by Taft Avenue to the east, Teodoro M. Kalaw Avenue to the north and General Luna Street to the west. It is dedicated to Olivia Salamanca, one of the Philippines' first female physicians, with a historical marker dedicated to her being installed in 1955.

Unlike other plazas in the City of Manila, Plaza Olivia Salamanca also falls under the jurisdiction of the National Parks Development Committee, the agency responsible for maintaining the neighboring Rizal Park.

== Renovations ==
The plaza has been renovated two times in recent history. New benches, landscaping and light fixtures were installed in the plaza's first renovation, part of a wider redevelopment of public spaces during the tenure of Lito Atienza, including nearby spaces such as Plaza Rueda and the Remedios Circle. The renovated plaza was inaugurated on June 24, 2006 as part of celebrations for the city's 435th founding anniversary.

Additional plants were planted in 2012, donated to the city by a non-government organization in a ceremony led by Atienza's successor, Alfredo Lim. In a more comprehensive second renovation, which took place during the tenure of Joseph Estrada, Lim's successor, new light fixtures were installed. The plaza was once again inaugurated on August 8, 2016.

A 2017 academic study found that the plaza had 32 trees planted, equaling a vegetated area of 137 square meters (1,470 sq ft) compared to a total area of 2,036 square meters (21,920 sq ft).

As of the term of Mayor Isko Moreno, Plaza Salamanca was one of the plazas in the city being rehabilitated. On January 1, 2022, the Manila City Government led by Moreno and Vice Mayor Honey Lacuna inaugurated the newly-rehabilitated plaza, alongside the lighting of the stretch of Kalaw Avenue. They dedicated the rehabilitation of the plaza to the works of Dr. Salamanca and all the healthcare workers, while the COVID-19 pandemic was ongoing.

== Use and surrounding structures ==
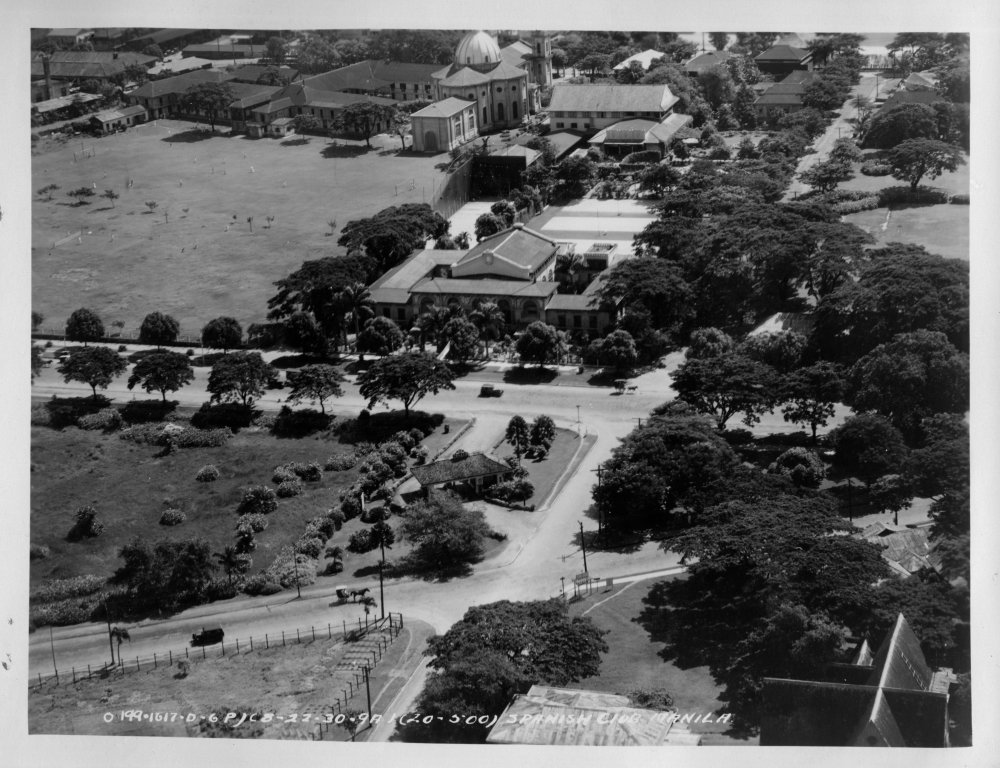
The Casino Español de Manila in 1930. Plaza Olivia Salamanca is the small triangular park visible on the right.

Plaza Olivia Salamanca is a freedom park along with Plaza Rueda on the other side of Taft Avenue, where protests and rallies may be held without requiring permission from local authorities. Its location near several government offices makes it a popular staging point for rallies and protests, particularly on Labor Day, and the nearby U.S. Embassy in Manila makes the plaza a popular starting point for anti-American protests led by militant groups. Other groups — not necessarily militant in nature — have also used the plaza to protest, including students, religious groups, jeepney drivers, women's rights activists, indigenous peoples, the urban poor, and even those opposed to the late President Ferdinand Marcos.

An entrance to the southbound platform of United Nations station on Line 1 of the Manila LRT is located beside the plaza. Aside from Rizal Park, other notable buildings and structures surrounding the plaza include the Central United Methodist Church, the headquarters of the National Bureau of Investigation, the Asia-Pacific headquarters of the World Health Organization, the National Museum of Natural History, Santa Isabel College and the Casino Español de Manila.

== Gallery ==
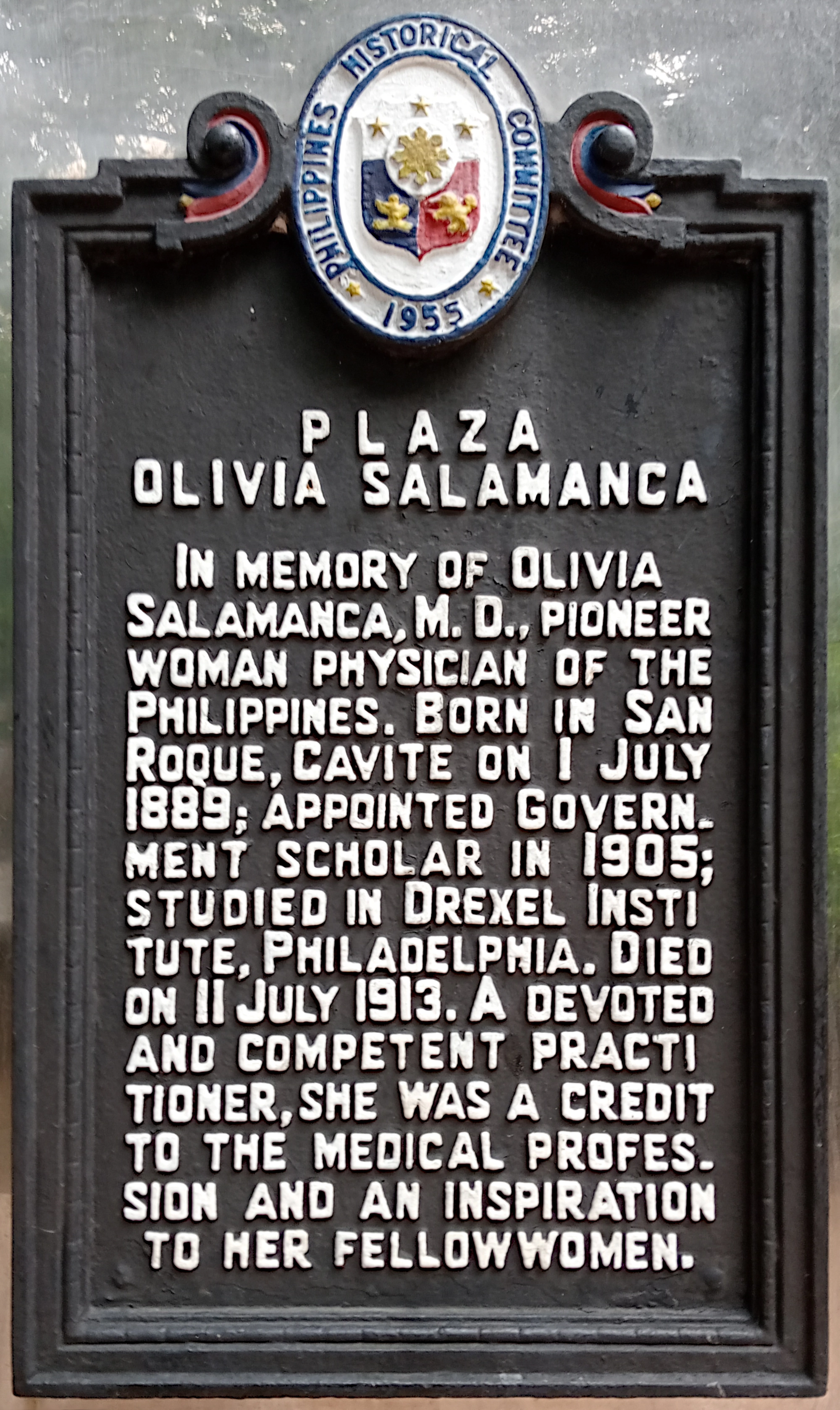
1955 Historical Marker Memorializing Olivia Salamanca's Medical Contributions

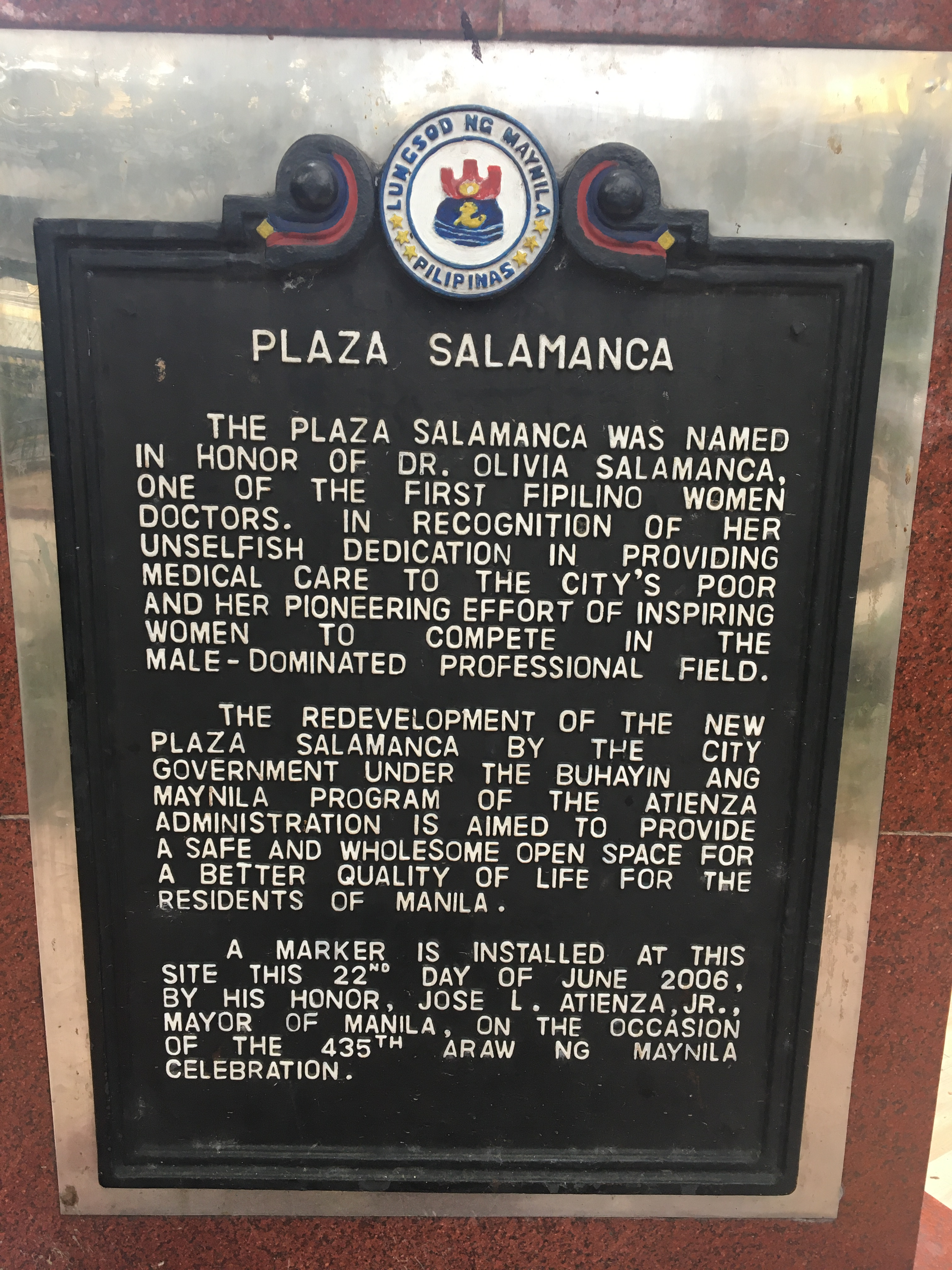
Plaza Salamanca 2006 Redevelopment Marker under Lito Atienza

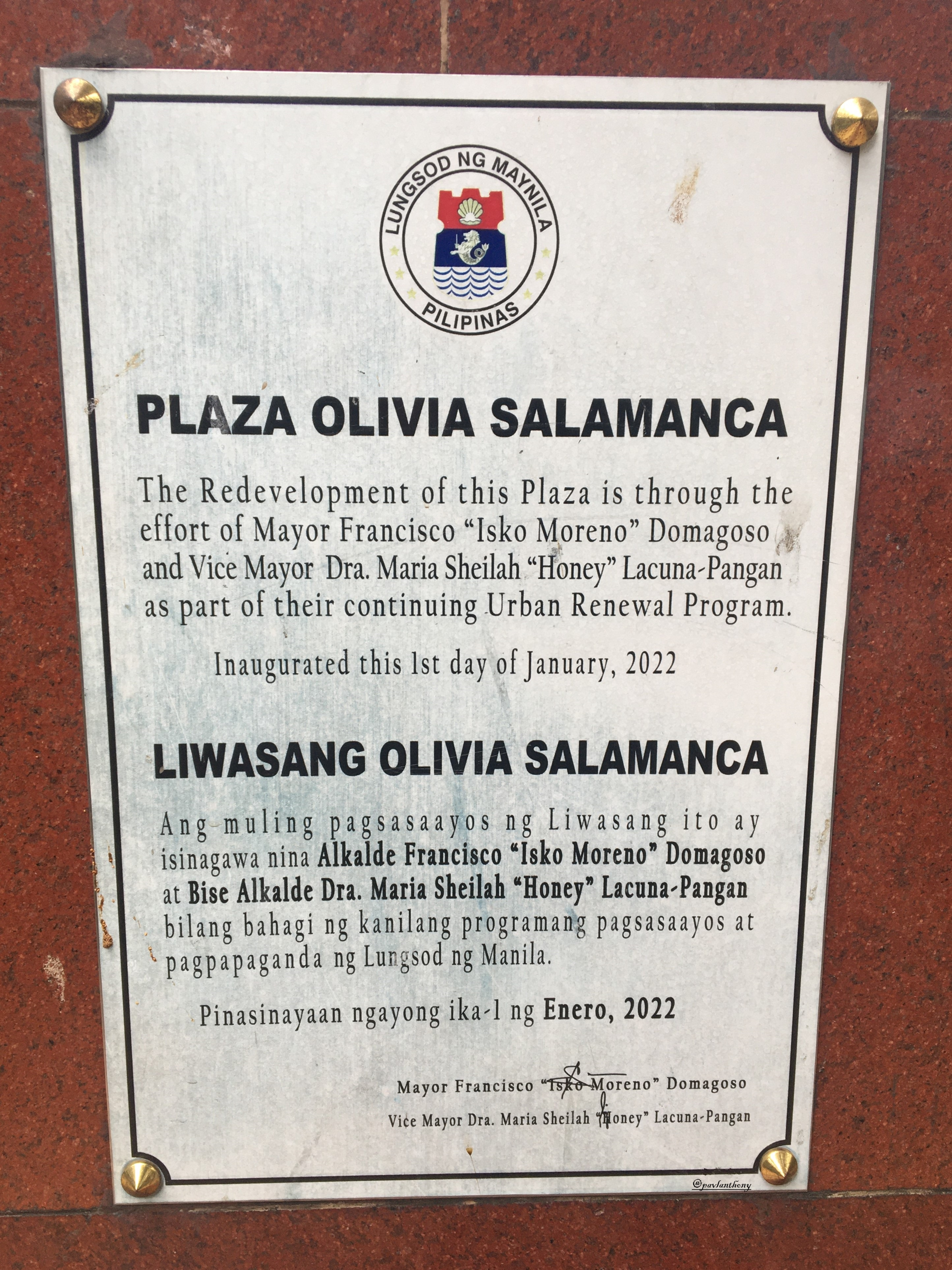
Plaza Olivia Salamanca 2022 Redevelopment Commemorative Plaque under Isko Moreno

== See also ==
- List of parks in Manila
- List of city squares
