= Olivia Salamanca =

Filipino physician

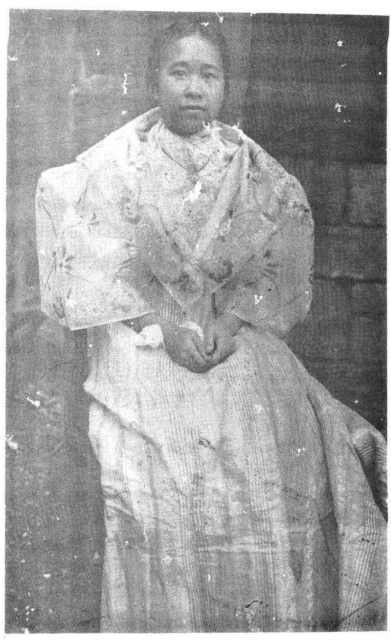
- Born: July 1, 1889; San Roque Cavite, Captaincy General of the Philippines
- Died: July 11, 1913 (aged 24); Manila, Insular Government of the Philippine Islands
- Occupation: Physician

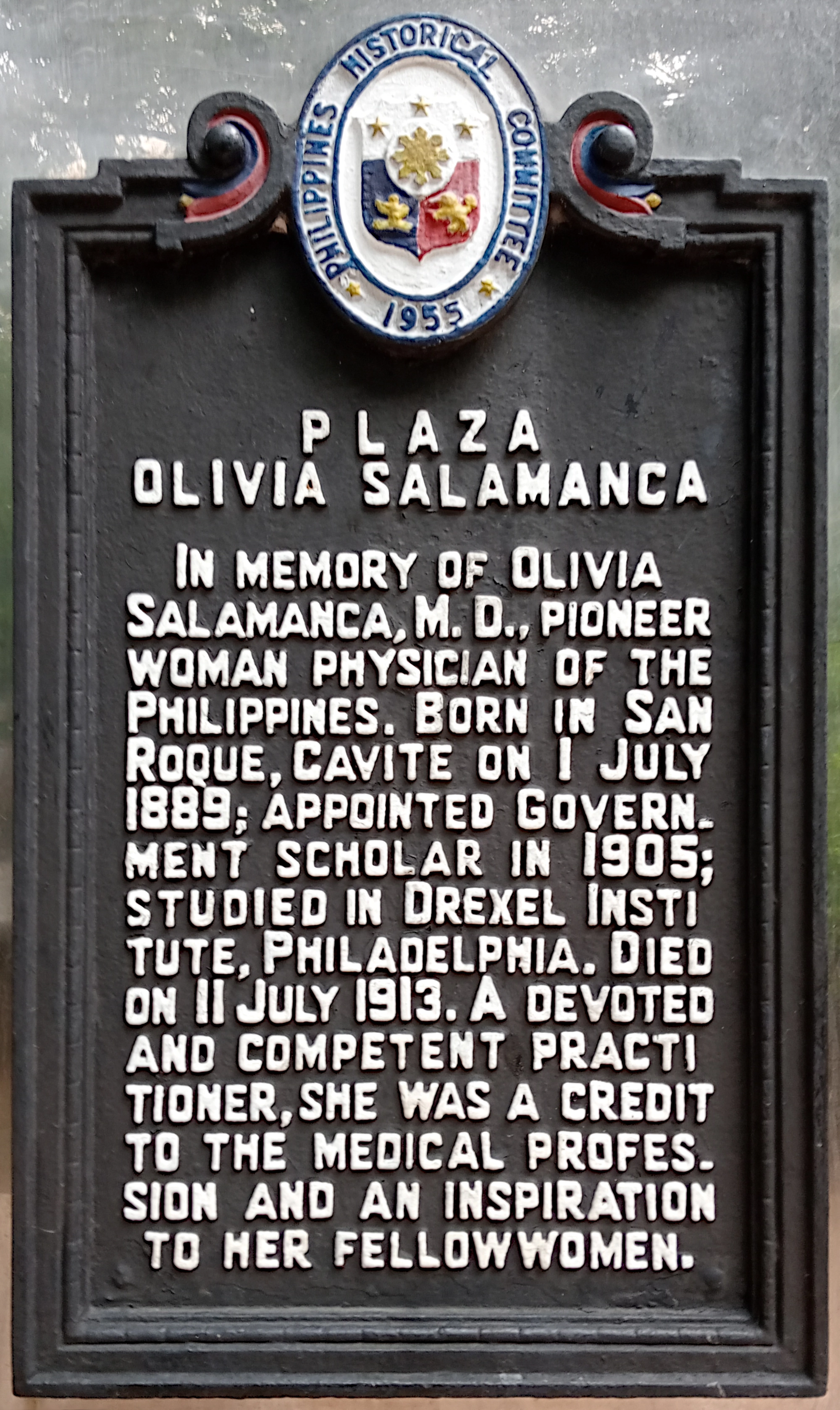
Historical marker for Plaza Olivia Salamanca in Manila

Olivia Salamanca (1 July 1889 – 11 July 1913) was a Filipino physician who trained in the United States at the Woman's Medical College of Pennsylvania in Philadelphia and was the second female physician from the Philippines. She died from tuberculosis at the age of 24.

== Early life and education ==
Olivia Salamanca was born on 1 July 1889 in San Roque, Cavite and attended Cavite National High School. Her father, Jose Salamanca, was a pharmacist and the founder of a private school in Cavite. In 1905, she was one of 37 Filipino students (and one of three women), known as pensionados, selected by the Philippine government under the Pensionado Act to study overseas in the United States. She spent a year in Saint Paul, Minnesota, before enrolling in the Woman's Medical College of Pennsylvania. She graduated in June 1910, at 20 years old, becoming the second female physician from the Philippines. While in the United States, she was the editor of The Filipino, a monthly publication created by Filipino student expatriates.

== Career ==
Salamanca returned to the Philippines in July 1910. She was one of the charter members and the first secretary of the Philippine Anti-Tuberculosis Society, which was founded in 1910; later that year, she was diagnosed with tuberculosis herself. In 1911, she was assigned to work at a hospital in Baguio, a city in a mountainous area, in order for the mountain air to help improve her health. She wrote in a 1911 diary entry that she was the first person in the Philippines to receive tuberculin as a treatment for tuberculosis, saying: "If tuberculin proves effective in the care of T.B. by the experiment made on me, I would feel as if I have rendered a public service to humanity. Should it fail ... then I shall be glad also for it would save many from its dangers."

== Death and legacy ==
In 1912, she left Baguio for Manila, where she was briefly hospitalized in the Philippine General Hospital. She died on 11 July 1913, aged 24, from tuberculosis.

Plaza Olivia Salamanca in Manila and Dr. Olivia Salamanca Memorial District Hospital in Cavite City are named after Salamanca.

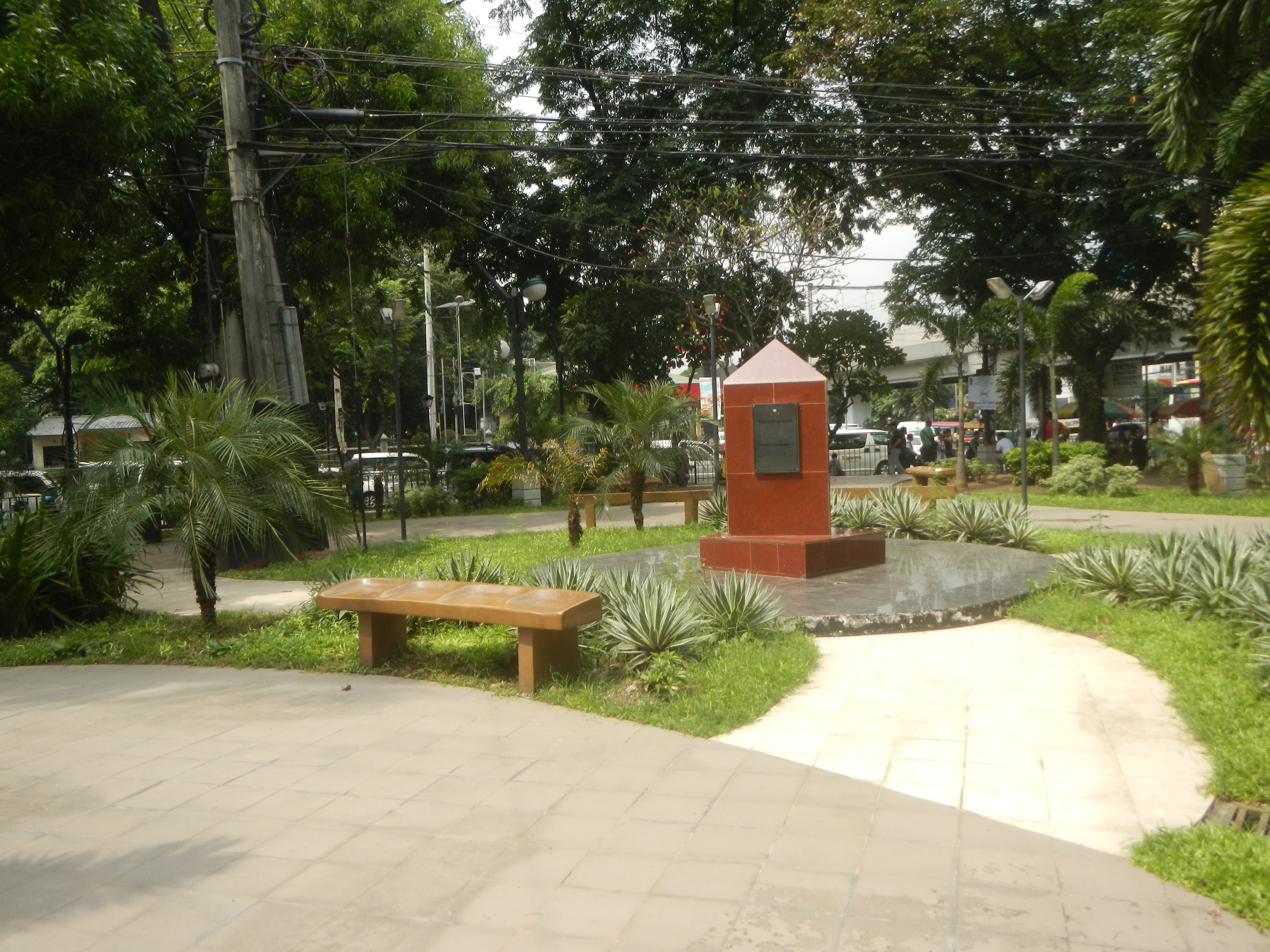
Plaza Olivia Salamanca in Manila
