= Cavite National High School =

Public high school in Cavite, Philippines

- Pambansang Mataas na Paaralan ng Cavite
- Schola Superior Nationalis Cavitensis
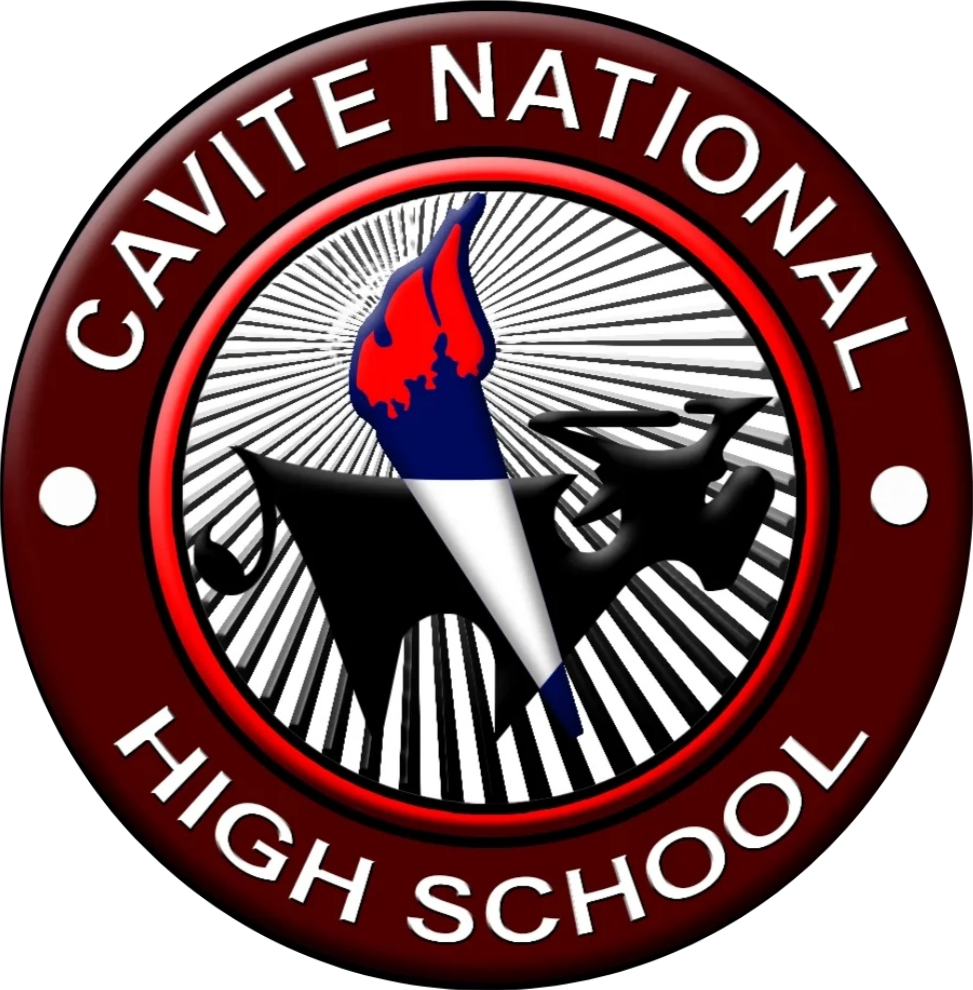

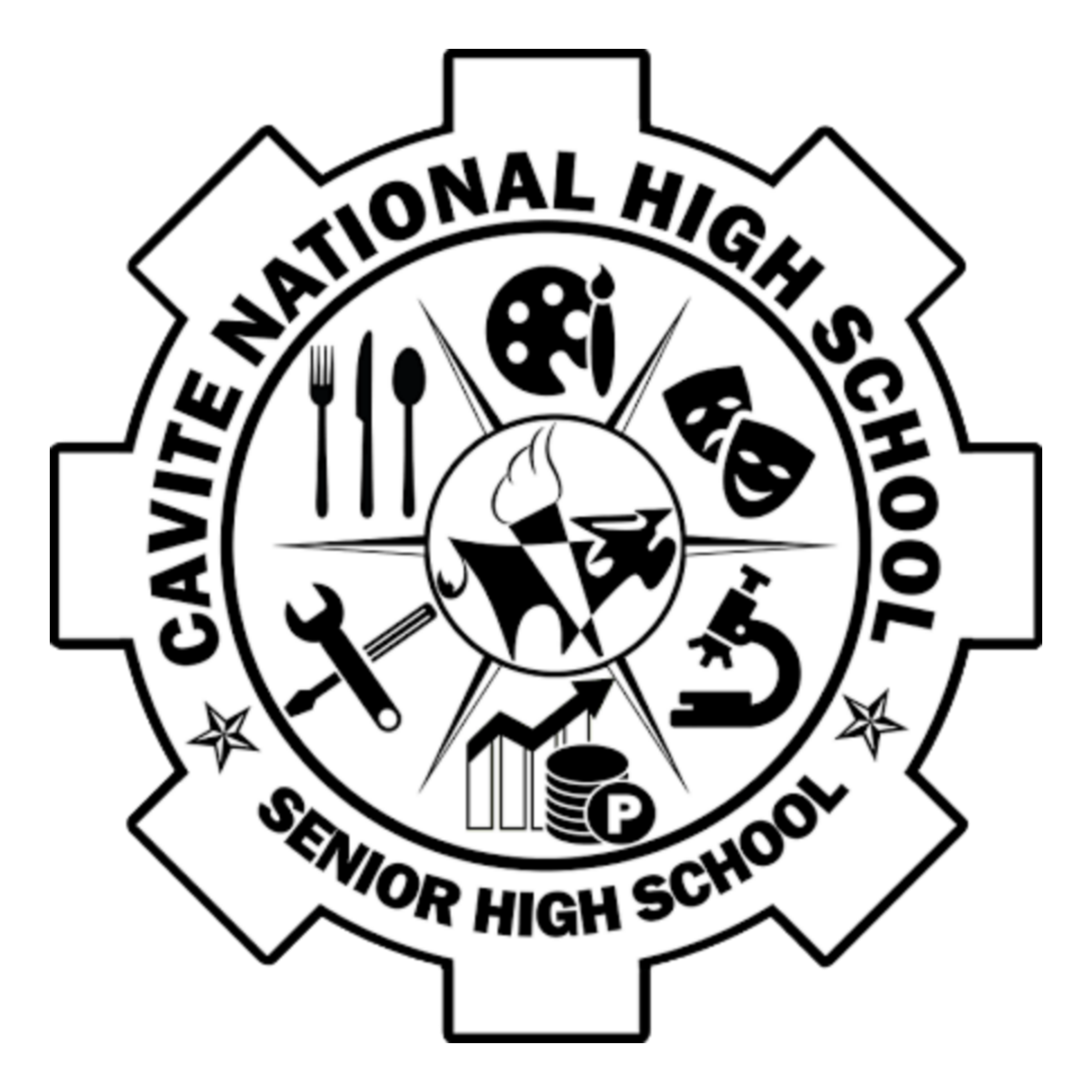

Location
- Chief E. Martin St., Caridad, Calabarzon; Cavite City, Cavite 4100; Philippines; 14°28′58″N 120°53′47″E

Information
- Other name: Cavite High
- Former name: Cavite High School
- Type: State-owned, public institution
- Motto: Learning Today, Leading Tomorrow
- Established: June 19, 1902
- Founders: Sydney K. Michelle; Hammond H. Buck
- Status: Operating
- School district: DepEd SDO Cavite City
- Category: Urban
- Oversight: Department of Education (Philippines)
- Superintendent: Gregorio A. Co Jr.
- School code: 301484
- Principal IV: Randie L. Salonga
- Assistant Principal II for Academics: Audrey Joy R. Panganiban
- Assistant Principal II for Operations and Learners Support: Mary Grace R. Marciano
- Assistant Principal II for Junior High School: Daisy B. Bautista
- Grades: Junior High: 7–10; Senior High: 11–12
- Years taught: Junior High: 4; Senior High: 2
- Gender: Co-educational
- Age range: 12–18
- Enrollment: 9,000~ (estimated)
- Education system: K to 12 MATATAG Curriculum; Strengthened Senior High School Curriculum
- Classes offered: Junior High School: Science, Technology, and Engineering Program; Special Program in the Arts; Special Program in Sports; Special Interest Program in Journalism; Regular Secondary Education Program; Alternative Learning System; Special Needs Education; Senior High School: Academic Track: Science, Technology, Engineering, and Mathematics; Arts, Social Sciences, and Humanities (formerly known as HUMSS and Arts and Design); Business and Entrepreneurship (formerly known as ABM); Technical-Professional Track: Aesthetic, Wellness, and Human Care; Artisanry and Creative Enterprise; Hospitality and Tourism; Information and Communications Technology Support and Computer Programming Technologies; Automotive and Small Engine Technologies; Construction and Building Technology; Industrial Technologies
- Language: English Tagalog
- Schedule: Blended Learning Delivery Modality (BLDM)
- Campus: Main Campus
- Campus size: 6 ha (15 acres)
- Area: Caridad
- Student Government: Supreme Secondary Learner Government (SSLG)
- Colors: Gold and Maroon
- Slogan: Tibay Cavite High!
- Song: Himno ng Pambansang Mataas na Paaralan ng Cavite
- Athletics: CNHS Intramurals
- Athletics conference: Cavite City Division Athletic Meet; Calabarzon Regional Athletic Association Meet; Palarong Pambansa
- Mascot: Carabao
- Nickname: Active Maroons
- Team name: Caviteñan
- Newspaper: Ang Caviteñan / The Caviteñan (JHS); Pluma at Piksel / Pens and Pixels (SHS)
- Yearbook: The Caviteñan
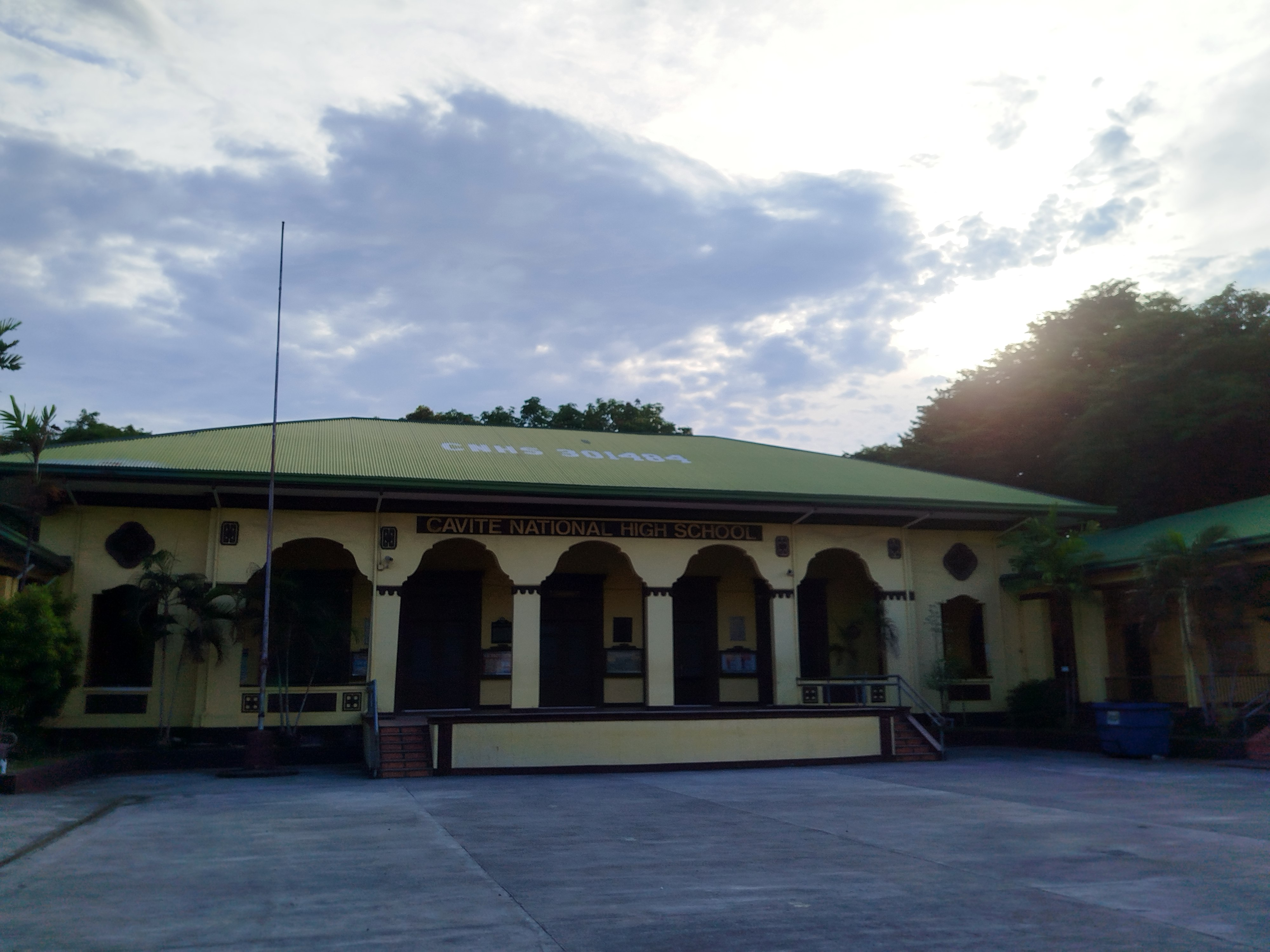
- The historic and iconic landmark, the Gabaldon Building

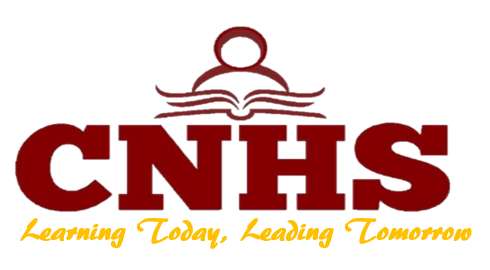
- The official motto of the school

Cavite National High School (Filipino: Pambansang Mataas na Paaralan ng Cavite) formerly known as Cavite High School (Filipino: Mataas na Paaralan ng Cavite) is a Secondary school located at the City of Cavite in the Philippines. It was established on June 19, 1902, and it is the first and oldest national secondary school in the Philippines. It is also recognized as a Calabarzon historical site by the National Historical Commission of the Philippines.

== History ==
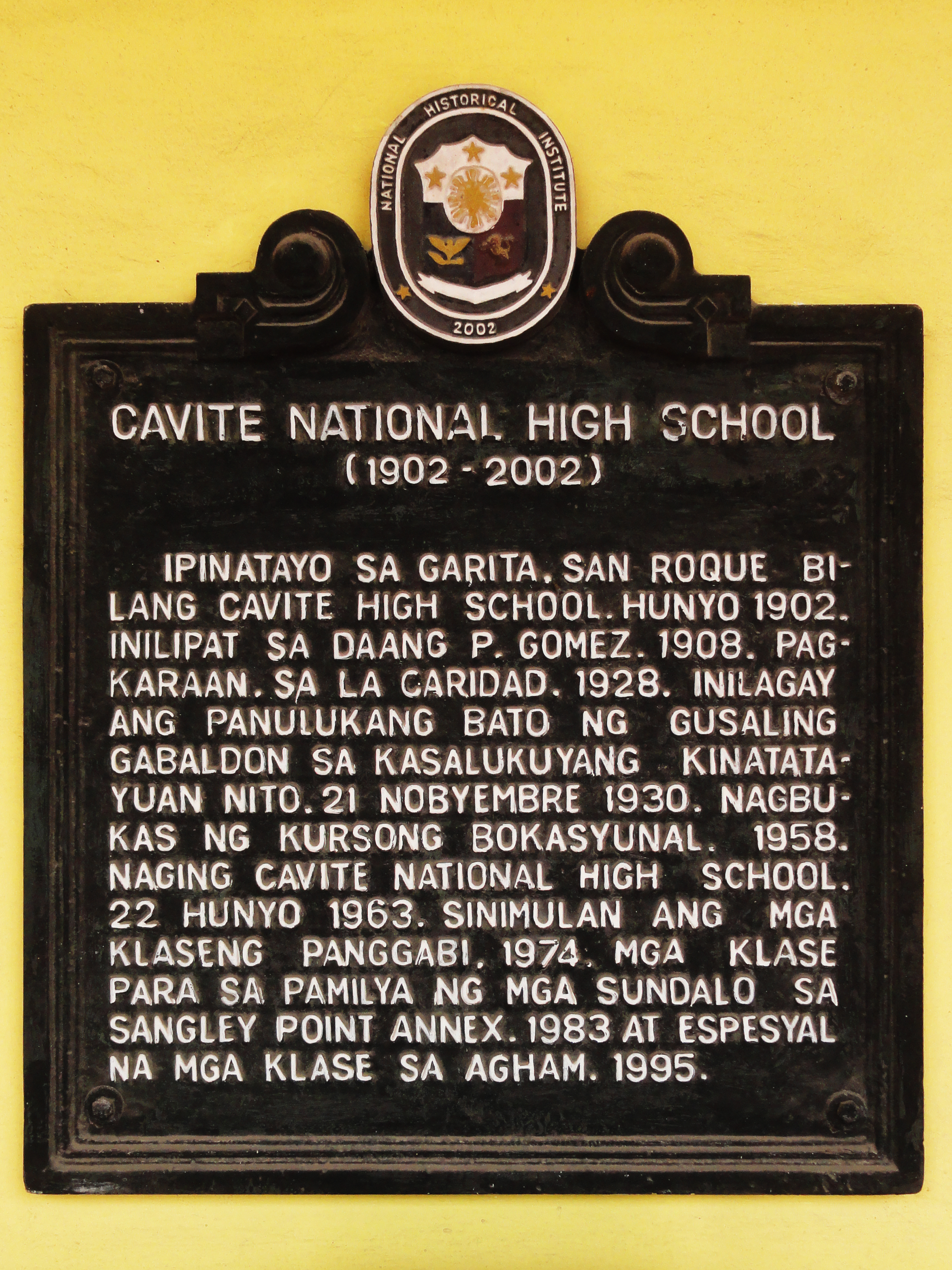
Historical marker installed in 2002

The foundational timeline of public secondary education in the province began on January 21, 1901, with the passage of Act No. 74 by the Philippine Commission. This historical piece of legislation laid the structural groundwork for the organization of public schools throughout the country. Following this mandate, the Provincial Board was officially authorized by Act No. 372 to establish localized secondary institutions. Recognizing the immediate educational gaps in the area, Mariano Trías, the progressive Governor of Cavite, formally recommended that a high school be built in either Cavite, San Roque, or Caridad. The initial campus site was chosen at the Isthmus of Rosario, situated in the town of San Roque, which is the exact location where Garita Elementary School operates today.

The school was formally established on June 19, 1902, opening its doors to an initial cohort of 25 eager students primarily hailing from the neighboring towns of Cavite, San Roque, and Caridad. Despite this milestone, regular classes could not immediately commence due to a devastating regional outbreak of cholera. Compounding the health crisis, the assigned buildings were found to be in highly dilapidated, unsanitary conditions; there were no classroom desks available, and the property had been utilized as a municipal pig pen. To rectify this, the first principal, Sydney K. Michelle, joined forces with pioneering educator Hammond H. Buck to raise 100 pesos out of pocket to finance the critical structural repairs. Through their efforts, the campus officially became operational on July 1, 1902, with an active roster of 30 students, which quickly grew to 61 by September 1 and peaked at 80 learners by November of that foundational year.

In 1903, Cavite High School moved its operations to a highly spacious, though legally contested, parcel of government property that housed an old Spanish military hospital. The student population expanded rapidly within this new layout, leading advanced students to organize the institution's first competitive debating society during that same year. Campus life flourished as the school administration established its inaugural baseball team in 1904, followed closely by a dedicated track and field athletic team in 1905. However, this golden period of growth was interrupted when the Supreme Court of the Philippines ordered the government land to be returned to the possession of the Roman Catholic Church. This legal eviction forced the high school to quickly relocate to P. Gomez Street, taking over the former official residence of the Spanish Provincial Governor. It was here that the school celebrated its first five graduates—four males and one female—in 1908. After a temporary shift to the Caridad Preparatory facility in 1928, the institution finally secured its permanent home: a sprawling 6-hectare lot generously donated by the Caridad Estate of Cavite, Inc. This historic transaction was made possible by Hammond H. Buck, who had transitioned from his early work in the Bureau of Education into private real estate development.

The academic landscape underwent a major modernization in 1957 under the administration of Principal Jose T. Bernal with the launch of the innovative "2-2 Plan" curriculum. This pedagogical framework split the secondary tracking system, giving junior and senior high school students the autonomy to select an educational track that best matched their skills: either vocational training, a college preparatory track, or a flexible elective curriculum. Under this setup, junior students were regularly deployed directly to the Cavite Naval Operating Base—now known as Naval Base Cavite—to undergo practical on-the-job training. These apprenticeships allowed students to specialize in mechanical repairs, machinery operations, practical electricity, welding, sheet metal fabrication, shipfitting, pipefitting, or foundry work. Concurrently, male students remaining on campus completed specialized woodworking courses within the school's dedicated shop, while female students trained in hair science, dressmaking, and fashion design within the campus Home Economics Laboratory.

Recognizing the immense regional impact and growing operational costs of the institution, lawmakers sought to secure permanent national funding for the school. This legislative effort culminated when President Diosdado Macapagal signed Republic Act No. 3694 into law on June 22, 1963, formally converting the provincial school into Cavite National High School. Decades later, in June 2002, the campus celebrated its historic 100th anniversary with massive civic pride. The centennial celebration culminated in a formal state ceremony at the Heroes Hall, where President Gloria Macapagal Arroyo presented the coveted Gawad Gintong Kalabaw (Golden Carabao Award) to the Top 100 Distinguished Alumni. This high-profile event was attended by Education Secretary Raul Roco, Cavite Governor Erineo "Ayong" Maliksi, and 1st District Representative Plaridel Abaya. Among the historic alumni honored that day were Maria Rizalina Bautista Poblete (Batch 1926) and Honorato Vega (Batch 1931)—two of the oldest living graduates—alongside renowned engineer Edward R. Caro and Professor Elmer Abueg, who had notably served as President Arroyo's economics professor at Ateneo de Manila University.

== Campus journalism ==
The campus journalism ecosystem at Cavite National High School operates as a primary pillar of student expression and literacy development, organized formally under separate departments for the junior and senior high school cohorts. At the lower secondary level, the student body is represented by two historically recognized anchor publications: The Caviteñan (JHS) and Pens and Pixels (SHS) publishing continuously in the English language, and Ang Caviteñan (JHS) and Pluma at Piksel (SHS), its sister publication serving the Filipino language domain. These student-led editorial boards provide a critical localized mirror to the social, political, and academic issues impacting Cavite City and the broader Calabarzon region.

The administrative foundation sustaining these student presses is rooted heavily in the Special Interest Program in Journalism (SPJ) managed by the Department of Education. Under the supervision of specialized programmatic coordinators and regional supervisors, student journalists undergo rigorous technical training in editorial writing, news reporting, photojournalism, copyreading, and cartooning. This specialized curriculum ensures that student-led media houses operate under standard industry procedures, preparing learners for competitive regional and national media environments.

The operational framework for campus journalism is legally protected and guided by national mandates, specifically Republic Act No. 7079, otherwise known as the Campus Journalism Act of 1991. This legislative statute ensures that the school administration protects the independence of the student press, preventing arbitrary administrative censorship while enforcing professional ethics within the student editorial board. To maintain these standards, the publication staff works in close alignment with designated School Paper Advisers (SPAs) who act as technical mentors rather than structural censors.

In recent academic years, the publishing architecture of the journalism wing of Cavite National High School has undergone a rapid digital transformation to adapt to shifting technological landscapes. While traditional print issues continue to be archived for physical record-keeping, the primary vehicle for daily news dispatch has transitioned toward official digital spaces and enterprise social platforms. This shift allows student reporters to deliver real-time coverage of school activities, division athletic meets, and civic assemblies directly to the community.

Beyond covering standard campus events, the publication wings of the school functions as an essential vehicle for socio-civic public service announcements within the school community. The publication routinely runs detailed investigative series and feature columns explaining localized administrative policies, such as environmental sustainability programs and green campus mandates. By framing institutional regulations within student-centric narratives, the publication translates complex rules into accessible, community-driven civic goals.

The performance metrics of the school's media teams are regularly validated through competitive performance at the Regional Schools Press Conference (RSPC) and the National Schools Press Conference (NSPC). Writers from both the English and Filipino divisions frequently secure top placements within individual and group categories, including Collaborative Desktop Publishing and Radio Broadcasting. These consistent achievements solidify the institution's regional reputation as a primary incubation hub for young journalistic talent in the Calabarzon area.

During the 2026 press conference cycle, Juliana Ysabella B. Dampitan from STEM 12 won first place in Editorial Cartooning in Filipino at the Rizal Reconfigured Regional Schools Press Conference. Dampitan secured second place at the NSPC held in Ormoc, making her the first student journalist in the history of the Department of Education Schools Division Office (DepEd SDO) Cavite City to achieve a national podium finish in the category.

=== Junior High School ===
- Ang Caviteñan (FILIPINO)
- The Caviteñan (ENGLISH)

=== Senior High School ===
- Pluma at Piksel (FILIPINO)
- Pens and Pixels (ENGLISH)

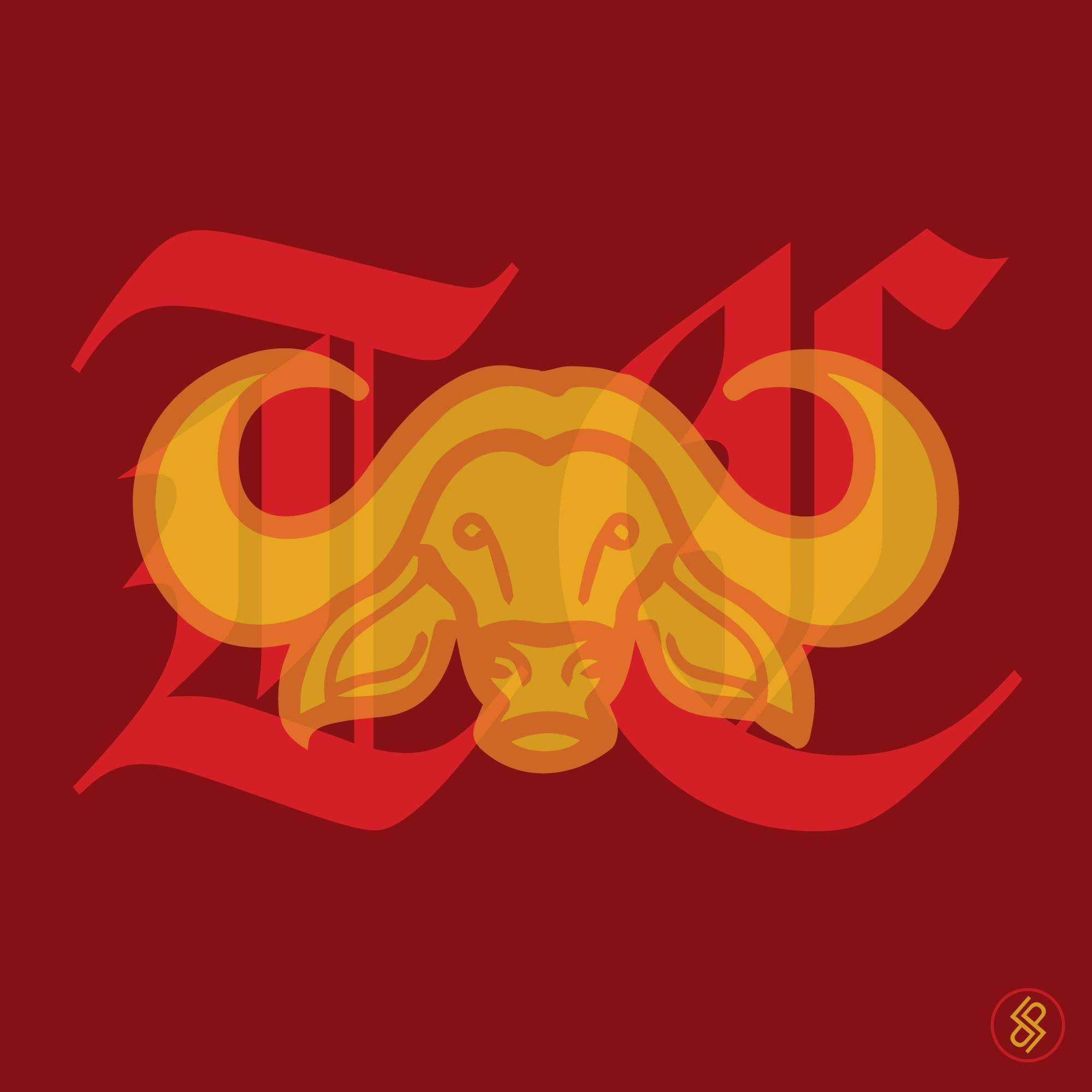
The Official Logo of The Caviteñan

== Student life ==
Student governance and co-curricular engagement at Cavite National High School are structured around a comprehensive network of accredited student organizations designed to foster leadership, civic duty, and academic specialization. The primary governing authority representing the unified student populace is the Supreme Secondary Learners Government, universally designated as the SSLG. Operating under the national structural guidelines of the DepEd Bureau of Operations, the SSLG functions as the premier student organization tasked with representing student interests before the senior faculty and administrative board.

Working in close coordination with student governance is an array of highly specialized academic and environmental groups. Prominent among these is the Youth for Environment in Schools Organization, or YES-O, which stands as the sole co-curricular environmental organization officially recognized by DepEd to consolidate green initiatives on campus. Established under national mandates, the Caviteñan YES-O chapter enforces local ecological directives, manages solid waste reductions, and spearheads regular campus clean-ups and tree-planting drives.

The scientific community within the Junior High School track is further segmented into specialized student guilds that drive empirical research and innovation. This includes the Caviteñan Young Researchers Guild (CYRG), specifically designed for students enrolled in the Science, Technology, and Engineering (STE) program. This elite group is supported by sister clubs such as the Alchemist Club, the Robotics Club (popularly designated as the Milkybots), the Edisonian Club, and the Mendeleevian Club, all of which provide experimental spaces for advanced STEM applications.

Complementing the academic tracks are health and wellness organizations, primarily the campus chapter of the Barkada Kontra Droga (BKD). Operating under the legal framework of Dangerous Drugs Board Regulation No. 5, s. 2007, this peer-led advocacy group acts as a primary preventative education shield against substance abuse among the youth. The group organizes regular drug-free lifestyle campaigns, sports tournaments, and creative arts festivals to provide productive social spaces and strong alternative outlets for vulnerable students.

To ensure structural organization and heighten campus security across a massive student population exceeding several thousand individuals, the administration implements a systematic grade-level color-coding policy. This color framework is visibly integrated into student IDs and institutional gear to allow instant demographic sorting: Grade 7 is assigned Green, Grade 8 uses Blue, Grade 9 utilizes Orange, Grade 10 wears Yellow, Grade 11 is marked by Violet, and Grade 12 is distinguished by Pink. This visual matriculation allows safety marshals and teachers to easily coordinate large crowds during institutional assemblies or sudden emergency drills.

While legitimate co-curricular clubs are heavily integrated into campus culture, the institution enforces an absolute ban on any unauthorized social organizations, specifically non-school fraternities and sororities. In strict compliance with Department of Education regulations, any student discovered organizing, recruiting for, or participating in clandestine fraternity rites faces immediate expulsion. The student manual notes that these unauthorized groups are prohibited because their past reliance on violent hazing and internal rumbles runs entirely contrary to maintaining a safe learning space.

This zero-tolerance stance against unauthorized groups is further reinforced by the comprehensive DepEd Child Protection Policy. This protective policy mandates the formation of a localized Child Protection Committee (CPC), which unites SSLG officers, guidance counselors, and parent-teacher associations to systematically counter child abuse, bullying, exploitation, and discrimination. By creating structured anonymous reporting loops, the CPC ensures that the student environment remains inherently inclusive and safe.

The following are the full list of recognized and official organizations and clubs in Cavite National High School:

=== Mother Organization ===
- Supreme Secondary Learner Government (SSLG)

=== Sister Organizations ===
- CNHS NDEP - Barkada Kontra Droga (BKD)
- Red Cross Youth (RCY)

=== Junior HS Clubs ===
- Youth for Environment in Schools Organization (YES-O)
- PILAK (Filipino)
- English Club
- Mathematics Club
- My-Scientia Club
- Araling Panlipunan (AP) Club
- Values Club
- Varsity Club
- Technology Geeks
- TLE Home Economics (H.E.) Club
- Special Program in the Arts (SPA) Club

=== Senior HS Clubs ===
- Research Revolution (R²)
- Samahan ng mga Mag-aaral sa Filipino (SAMAFIL)
- Sipnayanong Caviteñan (SipCav)
- League of Exemplary and Transformative Thinkers, English Readers, and Speakers (LETTERS) Club
- Green Growers Guild (GGG)
- Sports Club
- Tellusians
- ArtVox
- Humanitarian Association of Notable and Devout Students (HANDS)
- ASSETS
- Alliance of Vocational Innovators Society (AVIS)
- SALTYBOTS (Robotics)

SCIENCE - JHS Clubs:

- Caviteñan Young Researchers Guild (CYRG) (STE - Research)
- Alchemist Club
- Robotics Club (Milkybots)
- Edisonian Club
- Darwinian Club
- Mendeleevian Club
- Newtonian Club
- Galilean Club

== School music ==
=== Cavite national high school hymn ===
The official core of the school's ceremonies is anchored by the ”Cavite National High School Hymn” an English-language anthem featuring lyrics by Ms. Luz M. Ronquillo and musical arrangement by Dr. Romeo V. Micael. This ceremonial hymn uses traditional hymnology to frame the school as an intellectual and moral guide within the urban landscape, explicitly using metaphors like the “beacon of light” to describe the school's educational role. The piece is sung during weekly flag ceremonies, institutional assemblies, and events to instill formal discipline and a sense of historical continuity. The musical composition demands a unified vocal performance, which physically represents the shared focus and corporate identity of the student body.

[I]

The beacon of light of the city

The builders of knowledge and truth

Fountain of love, goodness and strength

Are molded in every heart

[II]

We honor our dear Alma Mater

Resplended with bliss though the years

Laurels we gain through thy wondrous guidance

Cavite National High

[III]

Great and Noble we stand

Firm, just and re-known

We pledge to thee.. Our gracious school Loyal and ever true (repeat II)

[CODE:]

Laurels we gain through thy wondrous guidance

Cavite National High (2x)

=== Himno ng pambansang mataas na paaralan ng cavite ===
In response to modern educational updates and language policies, the institution expanded its musical repertoire with the creation of the “Himno ng Pambansang Mataas na Paaralan ng Cavite”. This vernacular anthem features lyrics written by school leaders Mr. Randie L. Salonga and Mrs. Daisy B. Bautista, with musical composition by Mr. Cesar L. Nebril and Mr. Alvin T. Villarino. The text focuses on resilience, skill development, and institutional history, explicitly referencing the century-long journey of the school to ground current students in their heritage. By using Tagalog, the anthem makes the school's core values more accessible, ensuring that students feel a direct connection to the lyrics during official assemblies.

[I]

Limliman ka ng kaalaman

Gabay sa aming mga hakbang

Tanglaw sa aming paglalakbay,

Inang Paaralang Cavite High

[II]

Kakayahan namin ay iyong pinanday

Tungo sa mga pangarap na aming inaasam

Sa nagdaang siglo ng paglalakbay

Cavite High, salamat sa 'yong gabay

[III]

Mga tagumpay na laksang nakamit

Dangal ng lahi, dagsa mong hatid

Cavite National High School pa rin

Ang sa puso nami'y bumabatid

[IV]

Pagmamahal at pag-asa ang 'yong taglay

Katatagan at kahusayan ang iyong ibinigay

Pamanang hiyas ng ating lungsod

Ngayon at bukas, Cavite High

Mabuhay, Cavite High!

=== Welcome song ===
Complementing the themes of academic completion, the “Welcome Song” composed by Ms. Herminia V. Victoriano provides a celebratory counterweight designed for public performance during graduation assemblies. Victoriano's work emphasizes community solidarity, explicitly welcoming parents, educators, and external stakeholders into the academic space to witness the conferring of formal secondary school diplomas. The arrangement utilizes accessible melodic hooks and repetitive rhythmic cadences to invite audience participation, transforming a strict administrative ceremony into a shared community celebration. Through this piece, the school reinforces its localized civic mission, ensuring that the achievements of the youth are celebrated collectively by the broader community.

[Verse]

We welcome, we welcome you on this day.

Parents and Friends, teachers and guests

This is our closing day

With smiles and with tears, oh please sit and stay

For our diplomas will soon be ours today

Give thanks to GOD, we must remember

And to our old Alma Mater

Wherever we choose to wonder

Laurels we must seek and gather For this our dear Alma Mater

[Chorus]

Now let's sing our victory, victory!

And let's show our unity, unity!

And to prove our loyalty, loyalty!

Hail hail, all hail, all hail Alma Mater

Dear all hail, Alma Mater dear all hail

On this bright Commencement day

On this merry closing day

Hail, all hail

=== Farewell song ===
The musical history of the institution serves as a sonic repository of its cultural milestones, utilizing ceremonial choral music to transition students through academic milestones. A primary example of this is the “Farewell Song,” a piece written and composed by the renowned Filipino composer Rosendo E. Santos Jr., whose extensive background in classical orchestration influenced the melodic structure of the piece. This composition is traditionally performed during the final stages of the commencement exercises, acting as an emotional and artistic boundary marker for transitioning seniors. The lyrical content balances the melancholy of departure with an active expression of institutional gratitude, establishing a permanent psychological link between the graduate and the alma mater.

[Verse 1]

Fare Thee well dear Alma Mater

All for thee our proud hearts cheer

Let your guiding light

Glimmer clear and bright

Leave us not to doubt and to fear

[Chorus]

Thy mem'ry in our hearts will never die

As always thy banner will fly

Fame and glory for thy sacred name

We'll reap, we'll cherish Thee

In our hearts so deep

[Verse 2]

Comrades hail our Alma Mater

Make all gains divine

Then brighter she will shine.

[Verse 3]

Fare Thee well dear Alma Mater

All for thee our proud hearts cheer

Let your guiding light

Glimmer clear and bright

Leave us not to doubt and to fear

[Chorus]

Thy mem'ry in our hearts will never die

As always thy banner will fly

Fame and glory for thy sacred name

We'll reap, we'll cherish Thee

In our hearts so deep

[Outro]

Comrades hail our Alma Mater

Make all gains divine

Then brighter she will shine.

Fare Thee well, Cavite National High

Fare Thee well

== Institutional Governance and Academic Divisions ==
=== Top Management ===
The executive leadership of Cavite National High School is directed by a centralized administrative council. This team manages macro-level policies, academic tracking, and daily campus operations for the entire student body.

The council is structured into specific portfolios to balance instructional quality with campus logistics under the oversight of the Department of Education:

- Principal IV: Mr. Randie L. Salonga

=== Junior High School ===
At the Junior High School, specialized department heads manage the delivery of the national curriculum, handle instructional supervision, and coordinate teacher professional development across core subject areas. This structural setup ensures that specialized programs, including the Science, Technology, and Engineering (STE) track and the Special Program in the Arts (SPA), receive targeted resource allocation and continuous curriculum monitoring. Additionally, the administrative framework incorporates support services such as library management, guidance counseling, and medical operations to provide comprehensive student care. These sub-units work under the operational oversight of Assistant Principal II for Junior High School, Mrs. Daisy B. Bautista, ensuring that daily school operations match national educational standards.

=== Senior High School ===
The upper secondary tier uses a specialized tracking matrix designed to help students transition smoothly into higher education, vocational employment, or entrepreneurship. The Senior High School division organizes its faculty into subject groups and track specializations to coordinate advanced instruction across the Academic and Technical-Vocational-Livelihood (TVL) tracks. These groups handle career-specific instruction, manage technical laboratories, and coordinate off-campus industry internships or work immersions. To ads the unique socio-emotional and academic choices faced by upper secondary students, the senior high department maintains an independent guidance support desk. This specialized infrastructure helps ensure that students across different specialized fields receive targeted preparation that aligns with their specific career paths.

== Alumni and notable students ==
- Abe King - basketball player
- Joel Lamangan - film director
- Edna Luna - actress
- Olivia Salamanca - physician
