= Our Lady of Remedies =

Our Lady of Remedies or The Virgin of Los Remedios is a title of the Virgin Mary.

It may refer to:

- Church of los Remedios (Guadalajara), Spain
- Church of Nuestra Señora de los Remedios (Estremera), Spain
- Iglesia de Nuestra Señora de los Remedios, Cholula, Mexico
- Nuestra Señora de los Remedios Parish, Philippines
- Our Lady of Remedies Cathedral, Riohacha, Colombia
  - Festivities of Our Lady of the Remedies in Riohacha
- Sanctuary of Nuestra Señora de los Remedios in Fuensanta, Spain
- Santa Remedios Church, Northern Mariana Islands
- Virgen de los Remedios de Pampanga, a title of Mary venerated by Kapampangan Catholics in the Philippines

== See also ==
- Los Remedios in Seville, Spain, named following a convent in the district
- Los Remedios National Park, Mexico
