= Remedios Circle =

Road junction in Manila, Philippines

- Plaza de la Virgen de los Remedios; Remedios Rotonda; Rotary Circle
- Remedios Circle, with the Malate Bayview Mansion in the background
- Interactive map of Remedios Circle

Location
- Malate, Manila, Philippines
- Coordinates: 14°34′13.33″N 120°59′11.58″E
- Roads at junction: Remedios Street; Jorge Bocobo Street; Adriatico Street

Construction
- Type: Traffic circle
- Maintained by: Department of Public Works and Highways

Remedios Circle, also known as the Plaza de la Virgen de los Remedios, Remedios Rotonda, and Rotary Circle, is a traffic circle in Malate, Manila, Philippines, serving as the intersection between Remedios Street, Jorge Bocobo Street and Adriatico Street. The circle and a traversing street are both named after Nuestra Señora de los Remedios (Our Lady of Remedies), the patroness of the nearby Malate Church, and is one of two major open spaces in Malate, the other being Plaza Rajah Sulayman.

Originally a cemetery in colonial times, the circle is known today for being the center of Manila's nightlife as well as a popular cruising spot for men who have sex with men.

== History ==
Remedios Circle was originally the Malate Cemetery, built akin to what is now Paco Park. It was one of two traffic circles built in Manila during the Spanish colonial period, the other being the Carriedo Fountain on the Rotonda de Sampaloc (now the Nagtahan Interchange), although it wasn't originally built to serve as a traffic circle. For much of its history, Malate and neighboring Ermita were largely residential districts home to the Philippine elite, and the area around the circle was similarly residential, where it was surrounded by nipa-roofed houses and banana plantations, and a circular fountain—which has since been lost—stood at the circle's center.

The circle and its immediate area were destroyed by aerial bombs dropped in the Battle of Manila during World War II. Immediately after the war, the Malate Cemetery was turned over to the newly independent Philippine Government by the Church in the Philippines, demolished, and the bodies re-interred at the Manila South Cemetery. Although Malate and Ermita were subsequently rebuilt, both districts suffered from significant urban decay as former residents began moving out for the suburbs, and the area became a center for prostitution, vagrancy, and petty crime.

=== As a center for nightlife ===
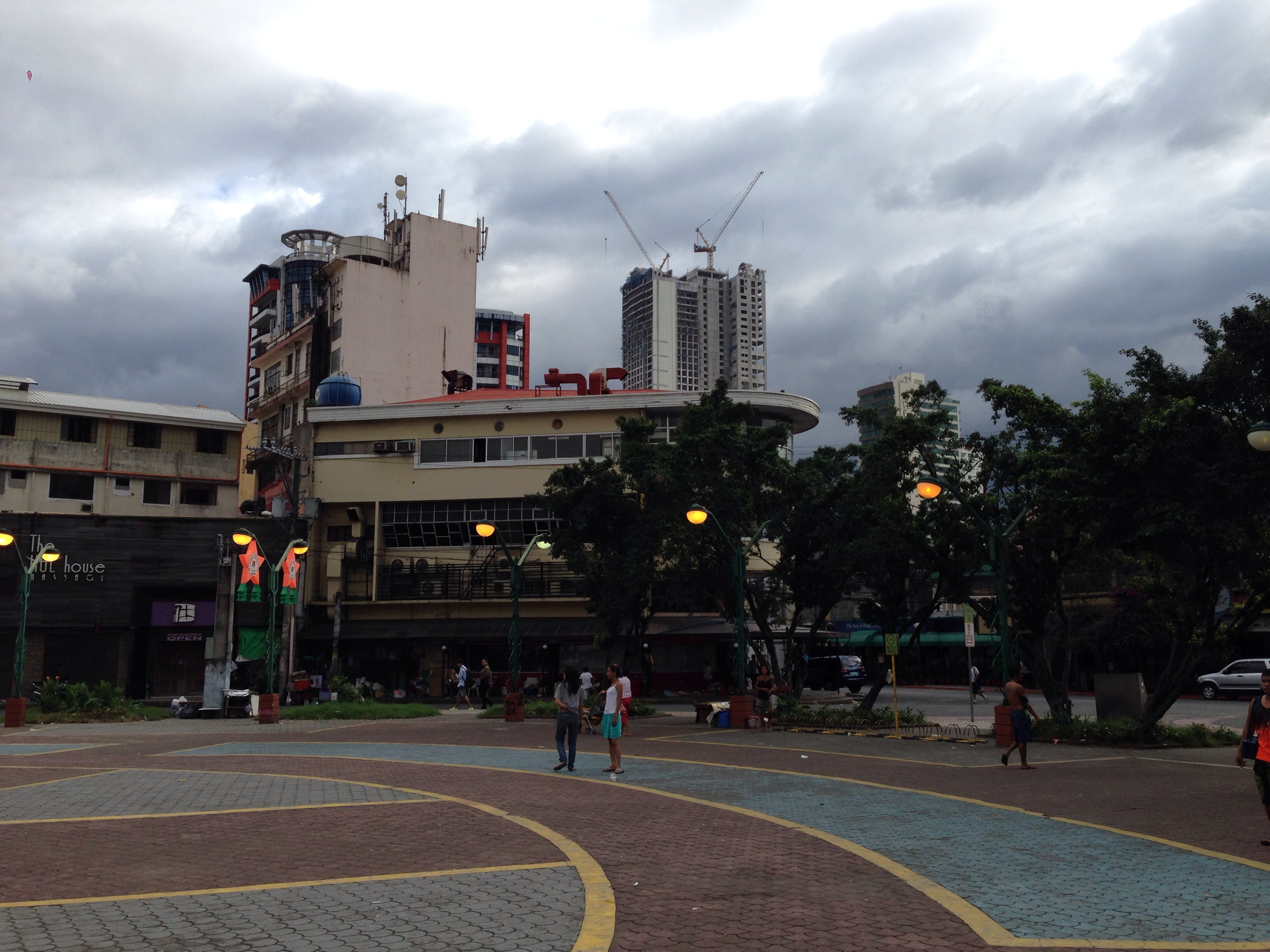
Remedios Circle at dusk

In 1980, restaurateur Larry Cruz opened Café Adriatico at the corner of Remedios Circle and Adriatico Street, attracting other entrepreneurs who have been credited for not only reviving the circle but also for transforming it into the center of Manila's nightlife for much of the 1980s and 1990s: an event which author Alfred "Krip" Yuson called a red-letter day in the cultural calendar of the Philippines.

Unlike other cities in Southeast Asia, such as Singapore, where the government invested heavily in developing particular areas for nightlife, little government investment was poured into transforming Remedios Circle, instead growing organically on its own. Government investment has focused largely on infrastructure improvements, with the circle last being renovated in 2006 and a bike lane connecting it to the Paraiso ng Batang Maynila opening in 2012. On August 30, 2009, a monument to Marcelo H. del Pilar was transferred here by the Association of Filipino Journalists.

== In popular culture ==
Remedios Circle was one of the settings for The Bourne Legacy, which was shot in Manila. In the scene, a Filipina woman, Marta, was being chased by two policemen from the Manila Police District until she reached a dead end: a narrow alleyway in a nearby slum. This alleyway, known internally as the "chasm", was custom-built for the movie, being built on a vacant lot across from the circle.
