= Assumption College San Lorenzo =

Catholic college in Makati, Philippines

- Former names: Superior Normal School (1892–1896); Assumption Convent (1904–1958)
- Type: Private Girls' Basic and Higher education institution
- Established: 1892; 134 years ago in Intramuros, Manila
- Founder: Religious of the Assumption
- Religious affiliation: Catholic (Assumption Sisters)
- Academic affiliations: PAASCU; SEA; Strategic Educational Alliance of Southeast Asia.
- President: Angela Regala
- Principal: Maria Angela Kara Decloedt
- Dean: Ma. Margarita Ladrido (College)
- Location: San Lorenzo Drive, San Lorenzo Village, Makati, Metro Manila, Philippines; 14°32′47″N 121°01′19″E
- Campus: Urban
- Colors: Gold; White; Blue
- Website: www.assumption.edu.ph
- Location in Metro Manila Location in Luzon Location in the Philippines

Assumption College San Lorenzo (AC, Assumption SanLo, Assumption Makati) is a private, Catholic basic and higher education institution exclusively for girls run by the Religious of the Assumption in San Lorenzo Village, Makati, Philippines. It was established by the Assumption Sisters in 1958 and named Assumption Convent. Assumption San Lorenzo is the successor of the closed school named Assumption Convent which was located along Herran Street, Ermita, Manila.

It provides education from pre-school, elementary, secondary, tertiary, to graduate level. The alumnae and present students of this school include daughters and granddaughters of Presidents, industrialists, politicians, actors/actresses and prominent figures in the Philippines.

Assumption College is a charter member of the Philippine Accrediting Association of Schools, Colleges and Universities (PAASCU). It has earned Level IV accreditation on all of its respective departments and schools.

== History ==
=== Early history ===
Sister Marie Eugénie Milleret de Brou (later canonised as Saint Marie-Eugénie de Jésus; 1817–1898) established the Congregation of the Religious of the Assumption in Paris on 30 April 1839 as a means to make a Christian transformation of society through education. The order arrived in Spanish colonial Philippines in 1892, and at the request of Queen María Cristina, consort of King Alfonso XII of Spain, they established the Superior Normal School for Women Teachers in Intramuros in 1892 which pioneered women education in the Philippines. Among its first alumnae were Rosa Sevilla de Alvero, Foundress of the Instituto de Mujeres; Librada Avelino and Carmen de Luna, who founded Centro Escolar University. At the outbreak of the Philippine Revolution of 1896, the order ceased operation of the school and returned to Europe.

=== Herran-Dakota campus ===
At the request of Pope Pius X, a group of anglophone Assumption Sisters returned to Manila in 1904; the Philippine Islands were by then already under American control. With the group of Sisters were 1.) Mother Helen Margaret as Superior, 2.) Mother Rosa María Pachoud, 3.) Mother Esperanza Maria A. CuUnjieng, Ed.D.(H.C.), 4.) Madame Angela Ansaldo, 5.) Sr. Lory Mapa, 6.) Sr. Luisa Locsin and 7.) Sr. Bianca Rosa Perez Rubio who subsequently spent most of her religious life in the Religious of the Assumption in Asia. Originally an elementary and secondary school, the college was added in 1940. Its successors are Assumption College San Lorenzo and Assumption Antipolo.

Formerly found in the genteel enclave of Ermita beside the former site of Ateneo de Manila University Manila Campus (now occupied by Robinsons Manila), the school very much resembled the renowned girls' schools of France and the rest of Europe, becoming a favorite amongst Manila's pre-War élite. It was considered a school for the alta de sociedad (high society) and there was no other value more emphasized than the French term noblesse oblige: “To whom much is given, much will be required.” The school was once at the corner of Calle Herran and Calle Dakota (now known as Pedro Gil and Adriatico streets, respectively), beside the old Padre Faura campus of the all-boys' Ateneo de Manila, where the brothers of Assumptionistas often studied. It was from this time when the so-called "Ateneo-Assumption" families sprung up, with entire clans exclusively attending either school. It offered subjects such as Spanish, French, language and reading in English, arithmetic, and religion, as well as manners and penmanship.

During the Second World War, the whole school and the rest of the city were destroyed by heavy aerial bombardment in the 1945 Liberation of Manila. As with many schools, Assumption College resumed classes in quonset huts and in a battered auditorium in the ruins of the Herran campus. Mother Superior Rosa María and Madame Esperanza Maria A. CuUnjieng brought the school back to its feet and relaunched it in 1947 when the Reconstruction began, reopening in 1948. The Herran campus officially closed its doors in 1973. The former Assumption Herran campus and the adjacent Padre Faura campus of Ateneo were sold and today Robinsons Place Manila currently occupy these former academic campuses. .

==== Architecture and culture ====
A vast and stately school with manicured gardens and other greenery, the Assumption Convent had school buildings in the neo-Gothic style which had high-ceilings and arcades. Similar to other French girls’ schools, the building sported arched windows and corridors, partly hidden floral medallions, (specifically the fleur-de-lys common to the other French girls' school, Saint Paul University Manila), and even a lagoon with boats.

The Herran Assumption also featured one of the most impressive school chapels in Manila. Neo-Gothic in design, the chapel featured arched, stained-glass windows and a comparatively small Gothic main altar. Students of the Herran campus still observed older practises of the Catholic Church, with students made to genuflect upon entering any place where the Blessed Sacrament was kept. In those days, students also signed for fifteen-minute shifts for the adoration of the Blessed Sacrament and they were excused from class while doing the Adoration. In the afternoons, the students with lacy white mantillas on their heads, filled the chapel for common adoration, ending the day with singing the Tantum Ergo.

Throughout the decades, certain unique activities and traditions emerged within the school's walls, earning the virtual label of "Assumption." There were the Assumption tarts (triangular tarts topped with guava jelly), and the Assumption siomai, beloved by students because of how it tasted like those made by Ma Mon Luk, a famous noodle shop. There was also Assumption cottage pie, ground meat topped with mashed potatoes served at the refectory. Students wore the distinct Assumption uniform of a tartan skirt (the fabric of which was first imported from France), sailor-collared shirts and a pin with a gold-coloured school seal. The lace-filled immaculately white uniforms called "gala dress" were reserved for more formal occasions such as Mass and Graduation Rites. Visiting guests had to contend themselves of speaking with the students in a parlour.

Students played a ball game they called bataille and were taught to curtsy before nuns, specifically the Mother Superior whom they were taught to address as "Notre Mère" ("our mother"). A lasting hallmark of an "Old Girl" is the school's conspicuous penmanship known as "Assumption Script". Letters are distinctly long with sharp elongated points, it is a precise cursive, with flourished majuscules and jagged tails. It was a source of pride, according to Gonzalez, and a way of immediately identifying an Herran Assumptionista.

=== Herran closure and San Lorenzo-Antipolo transfers ===
The school then expanded to its San Lorenzo, Makati campus, welcoming 180 students into its preparatory and elementary levels in June 1958. The following year, Assumption College San Lorenzo opened its doors to college-bound young women, and the college moved there in 1959.

After some time, the Herran campus was sold as the area was becoming a commercial and tourist center, not conducive to learning. In 1972–73, four San Lorenzo campus teachers were transferred to pave the way for merging elementary schools and secondary schools of Herran and San Lorenzo. In 1973–74, the Herran and San Lorenzo schools fused: the High School and the college were based in San Lorenzo while the Preschool and Grade School briefly occupied Herran, temporarily moving to San Lorenzo in June 1974.

The Grade School finally resettled in Assumption Antipolo along Sumulong Highway on 11 September 1974, with the Preschool staying in San Lorenzo. However, the distance between Antipolo and Manila became a problem, driving alumnae and parents to petition the college to re-open the elementary level in San Lorenzo. Grade 1 was re-opened in 1981 and starting school year 1988–89, grade levels were added until the San Lorenzo Grade School's first batch of seventh Grade students graduated in March 1993.

== Academic institution ==
- Basic Education Division
- Tertiary education institutions
  - The Marie-Eugénie School of Innovative Learning (MESIL)
  - Milleret School of Business and Management for Women (MSBMW)

=== Academic linkages ===
The college is part of the Women's Consortium of Colleges which includes St. Scholastica's College Manila in Malate, La Consolacion College Manila in Mendiola, College of the Holy Spirit Manila in Mendiola. St. Paul University Quezon City, and Miriam College in Katipunan, Quezon City.

== Notable alumnae ==
- Corazón Aquino (1933–2009) – eleventh President of the Philippines (1986–1992), figurehead of the 1986 People Power Revolution. Studied for a year before enrolling at the affiliated Ravenhill Academy in the United States.
- Gloria Macapagal Arroyo – fourteenth President of the Philippines (2001–2009), former Vice-President of the Philippines, Senator, Social Welfare Secretary, and Undersecretary for Trade
- Victoria Quirino-Delgado – former first lady; her father's official hostess in Malacañang. She was a senior high- school student at Assumption Convent when she moved to the palace.
- Loren Legarda – Senator, former broadcast journalist and actress
- Grace Poe Llamanzares – Senator, adopted daughter of actors Fernando Poe, Jr. and Susan Roces; former MTRCB Chairwoman
- Gina de Venecia – Congresswoman of the 4th district of Pangasinan; wife of former senator José de Venecia, Jr.
- Gina Lopez (1953-2019) – late Secretary of Environment and Natural Resources and a member of the prominent López family of Iloilo
- Teresa Aquino-Oreta – former senator; sister of assassinated opposition Senator Benigno Aquino Jr. and sister-in-law of Corazon Aquino (see above)
- Jamby Madrigal – politician and former senator
- Isabel Preysler – Madrid-based Spanish-Filipino socialite; ex-wife of Julio Iglesias and mother of singer Enrique Iglesias, ex-wife of the marqués de Griñón.
- Celia Diaz-Laurel – thespian, painter, writer, poet
- Bambi Harper – cultural writer and socialite; former president of the Heritage Conservation Society of the Philippines; columnist for the Philippine Daily Inquirer
- Fides Cuyugan-Asensio – soprano; Professor Emeritus at the University of the Philippines Voice and Music Theater/Dance Department
- Boots Anson-Roa – award-winning actress, columnist, editor, and lecturer
- Cory Quirino - television host, author, beauty pageant titleholder, and granddaughter of Philippine President Elpidio Quirino
- Alodia Gosiengfiao - cosplayer, television personality
- Paraluman (1923–2009) – a FAMAS-award-winning Filipino actress
- Joey Albert – singer
- Emmylous Gaite (also known as Nicole Hyala) – radio jock at Love Radio in the Philippines, graduated cum laude at Assumption
- Marilou Díaz-Abaya (1955–2012) – award-winning director
- Toni Rose Gayda – television presenter and celebrity
- Ella del Rosario - multi-Platinum recording artist, radio/TV show host and movie actress, triple Aliw awardee and multi-awarded KBP music icon who revolutionized Filipino music with her country-popular Manila Sound recording hits
- Vicki Belo – dermatologist and celebrity
- Leah Navarro – actress, singer, executive director of The Black & White Movement
- Mickey Ferriols – actress
- Maricel Laxa – actress
- Christine Bersola-Babao – broadcast journalist, actress, radio-television personality
- Tessa Prieto-Valdes – columnist, interior designer, media personality, philanthropist, and socialite
- Gang Badoy – founder of RockEd Philippines, radio and television host, feature writer, TOWNS (The Outstanding Women in the Nation's Service) and TOYM (Ten Outstanding Young Men) awardee
- Georgina Wilson – model; celebrity
- Isabelle Daza – celebrity; model
- Bianca Manalo – celebrity, actress, model, and beauty pageant holder (Miss Universe Philippines 2009), graduated with a course of Bachelor of Communication major in Advertising and Public Relations
- Niña Jose-Quiambao - politician, former actress
