= Virgen de los Remedios de Pampanga =

Patroness of Pampanga

The Virgin of Remedies of Pampanga Sancta Virgo Remediorum
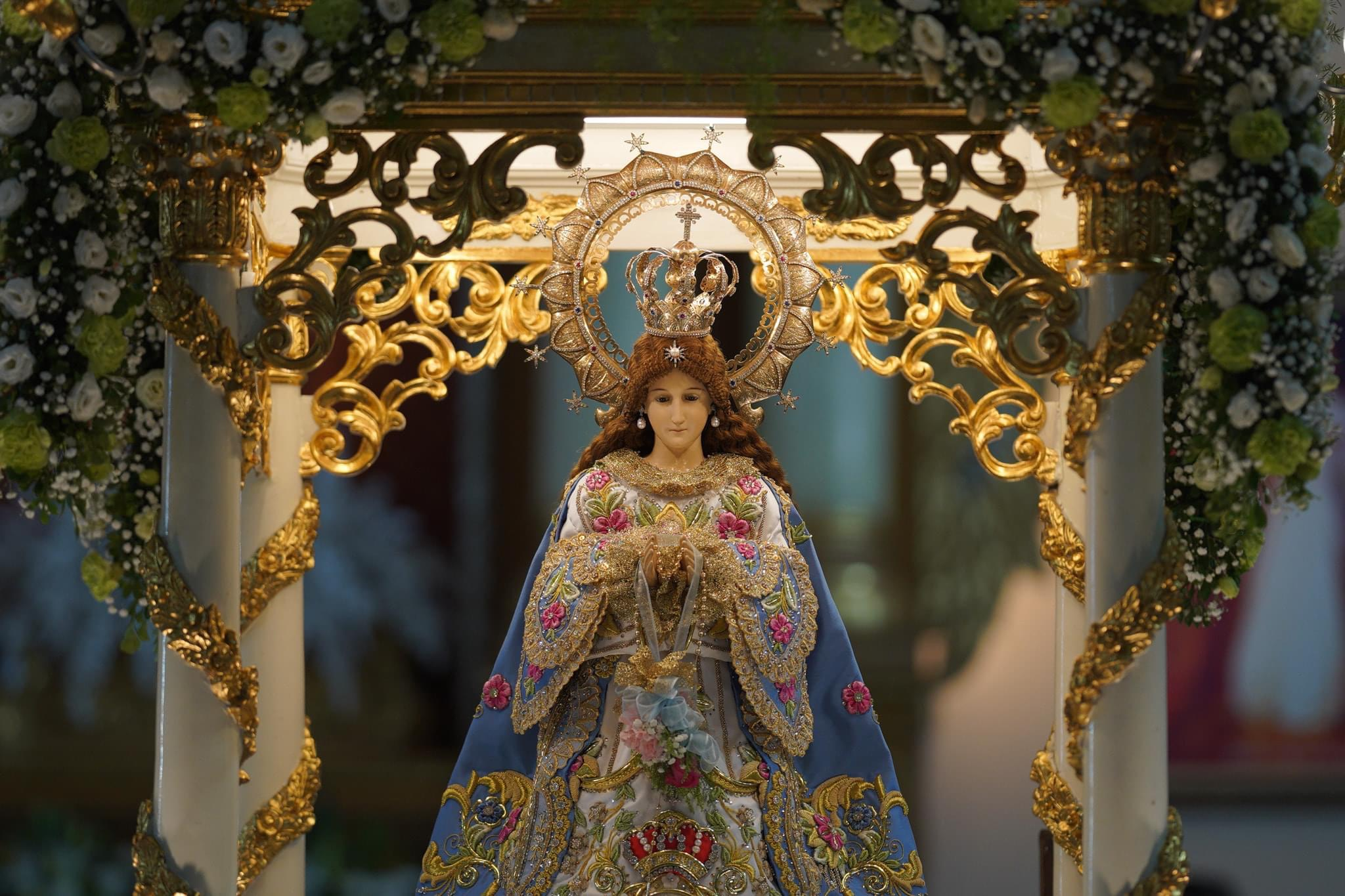
- The canonically crowned statue

Virgin of Remedies, Queen of Pampanga, Indu ning Capaldanan, Tula ding Kapampangan
- Venerated in: Roman Catholic Church
- Major shrine: Repository of Our Virgen De los Remedios, Archdiocese of San Fernando
- Feast: September 8, Feast of the Nativity of the Blessed Virgin Mary
- Attributes: The Blessed Virgin Mary encrusted with jewels, golden crown, aureole and moon.
- Patronage: Pampanga, Kapampangan people, Roman Catholic Archdiocese of San Fernando
- Controversy: Suppression of Communism

The Virgin of Remedies of Pampanga (Latin: Virgo Remediorum de Pampangensis) also known as Vírgen de los Remedios de Pampanga is a Roman Catholic image of the Blessed Virgin Mary venerated by Capampangan Catholics as the official patroness of Pampanga, Philippines.

Pope Pius XII granted a Pontifical decree of coronation to the image on 15 July 1956. Its feast day is annually celebrated on September 8th and is often paired with a Crucifix called Santo Cristo del Perdón (English: the Holy Christ of Forgiveness) widely held by pious believers to combat Communism.

== History ==
The original devotion to Our Lady of Good Remedy dates back to the twelfth century, when it was started in France by the Order of the Most Holy Trinity and of the Captives. The Spanish brought it to the Philippines. In 1624, the Catholic priest Juan Guevara, O.S.A. installed a namesake statue from Andalucía, Spain in Malate Church.

In the 1950s after the Second World War, the province of Pampanga was plagued with Communism which threatened both the Catholic religion and social order in the Philippines. The lower and the middle class laity conflicted with wealthy landowners, which caused much political unrest in the region.

The first Bishop of San Fernando, Caesar María Guerrero y Rodríguez, decided to revive the Marian devotion introduced to Manila and Pampanga in 1574 by the Spanish in an attempt to ease tensions. Guerrero was a native of Malate, Manila, where the local church enshrined a similar image of Our Lady of Remedies.

Bishop Guerrero requested the image of the Virgen de los Remedios, already venerated as Our Lady of Remedies in Barrio Baliti, San Fernando, be lent for a new apostolate working towards peace and reconciliation, called Cruzada de Penitencia y Caridad ("Crusade of Penance and Charity"). Various towns then took turns hosting the image, with prayers and donations coming chiefly through wealthy noblewomen and widows who contributed to the religious group. The Cruzada is characterised by consistent religious processions and recitations of Rosary, which made the devotion popular among the masses. A system of bylaws for the apostolate was created, making the group more organized and official, helping it to grow and increased ecclesiastical recognition.

By 1954, the people of Baliti became adamant in requesting that their image be returned. As a result, Bishop Guerrero commissioned the santero artist Victoriano Siongco to carve a much larger image of the Virgin Mary for the official use of the Cruzada, and the Baliti image was returned to its original parish.

== Pontifical coronation ==
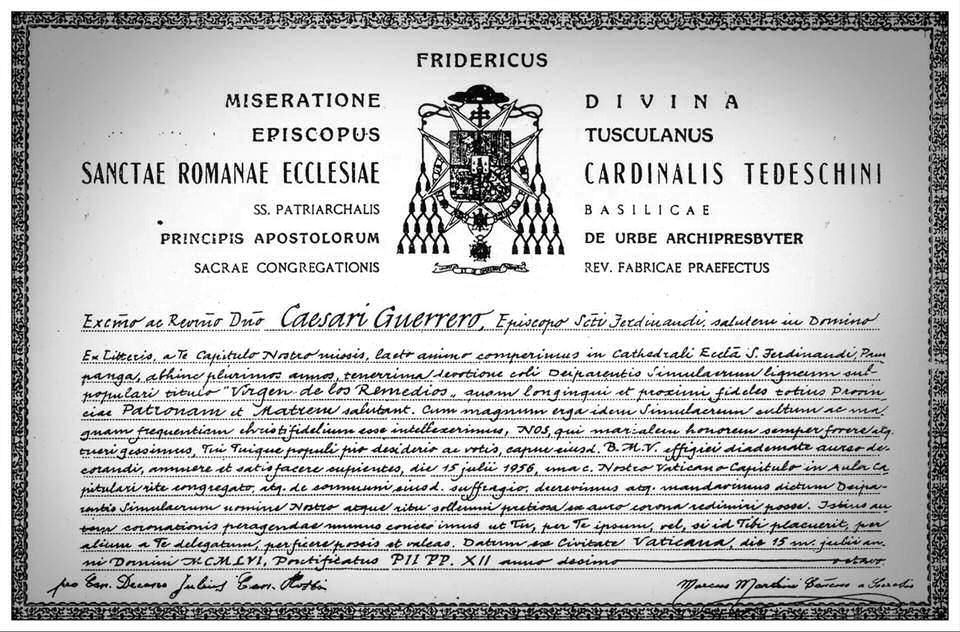
The papal decree issued by Pope Pius XII for the canonical coronation of the image in 1956

On 11 February 1956, Bishop Cesar Maria y Guerrero submitted a petition to Cardinal Federico Tedeschini, who at the time was the Apostolic Dataria to Pope Pius XII requesting to grant a canonical coronation.

Pope Pius XII issued the pontifical decree on the canonical coronation for the image on 15 July 1956. The bull was signed by Secretary Deacon of the Vatican Chapter, Giulio Rossi and notarized by the Secretary to the Apostolic Dataria, Marco Martini. The Papal nuncio to the country, Egidio Vagnozzi executed the rite of coronation on 8 September 1956, which now commemorates the same day of its current feast. To date, the people of Pampanga continue to hold the commemorative ceremonial of its coronation as an annual event.

== Feast and veneration ==
The Feast of Virgen de los Remedios of Pampanga is celebrated each 8 September, the Nativity of Mary. In the United States, the Archbishop of Los Angeles, California crowns a replica of the image each year at the Cathedral of Our Lady of the Angels.

In 2010, Capampangans in the Bay Area also started with an annual re-enactment of the canonical coronation. The initial coronation was held at the Our Lady of Peace Shrine in Santa Clara, California. Since then, the event rotates through the Diocese of San Jose, Diocese of Oakland and the Archdiocese of San Francisco and is held every second Sunday of November.

== See also ==
- Our Lady of Guidance
- Santo Niño de Cebu
