= Robinsons Manila =

Shopping mall in Manila, Philippines

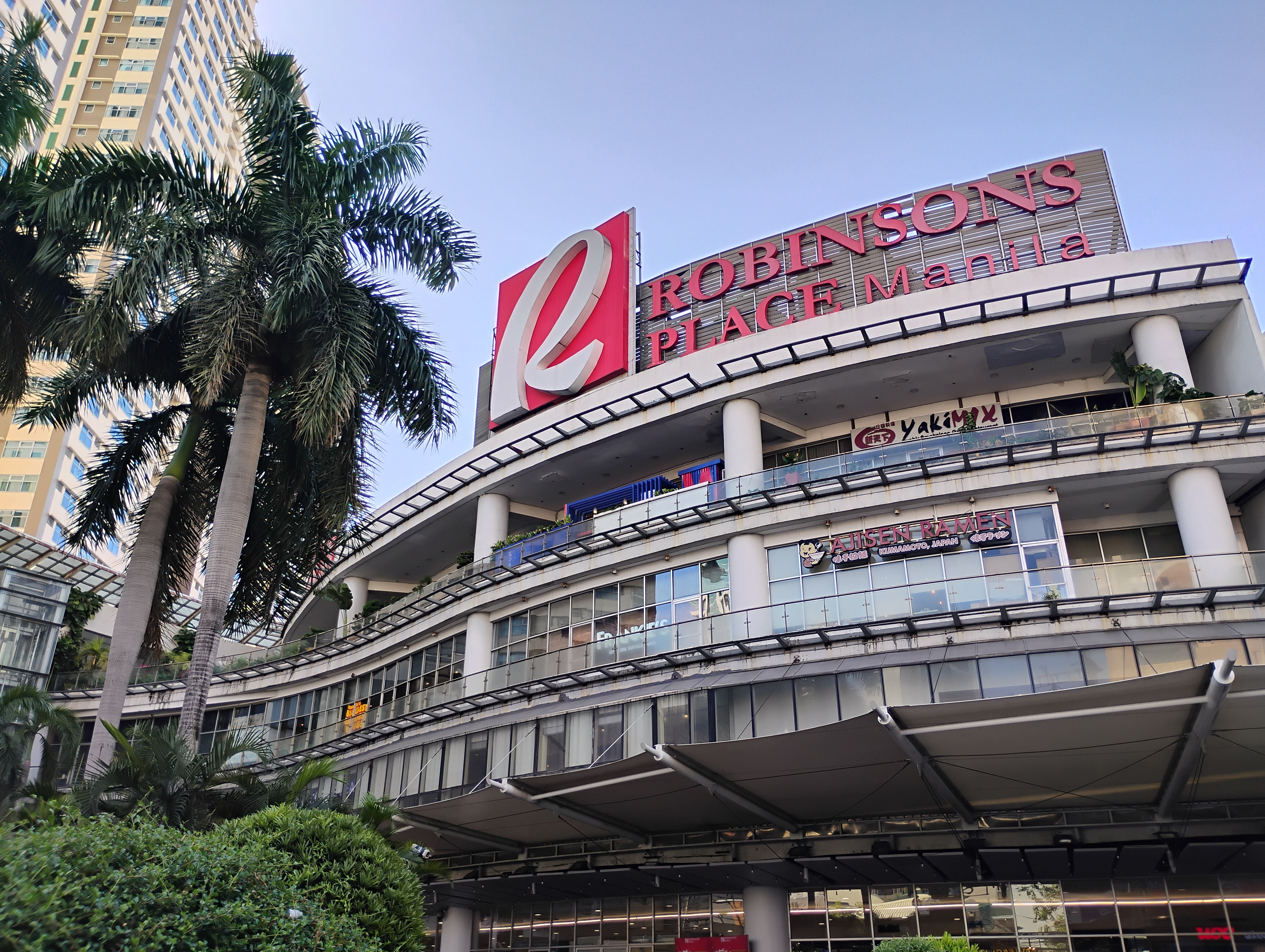
- Robinsons Manila in 2025
- Location: Ermita, Manila
- Coordinates: 14°34′35″N 120°59′2″E
- Address: Pedro Gil Street and Adriatico Street
- Opened: Main Mall: 1980; 46 years ago; Padre Faura Wing: June 2000; 26 years ago; Midtown Atrium: 2008; 18 years ago
- Developer: Robinsons Malls
- Manager: Robinsons Malls
- Owner: Robinsons Land Corporation
- Num. of stores: 500+
- Num. of anchor tenants: 10
- Floor area: 240,000 m²
- Floors: 7
- Parking: 1,000 slots
- Public transit: Pedro Gil; 5 6 7 17 23 34 38 40 42 49 53 Robinsons Manila
- Website: www.robinsonsmalls.com/mall-info/robinsons-place-manila

Robinsons Manila (formerly Robinsons Place Manila, also known as Robinsons Ermita and Robinsons Place Ermita), is a large shopping mall located in Ermita, Manila, Philippines. It is the largest Robinsons Mall ever built. Robinsons Manila is located beside the University of the Philippines Manila and the Philippine General Hospital, and is built at the site of the former Ateneo de Manila Campus and Assumption Convent. The first major expansion of the mall happened when it opened its Padre Faura Wing in June 2000. The mall was further expanded in 2006 when the nearby Manila Midtown Hotel was demolished to make way for the construction of its Midtown Wing and the Adriatico Place Residences. Redevelopment of the mall began in 2019 and was completed in 2026.

Robinsons Manila is connected to two high-rise residential condominiums: the 37-storey twin tower Robinsons Place Residences, and the triple tower Adriatico Place Residences.

== History ==
Robinsons Place Manila and Robinsons Place Residences as seen from Padre Faura Street.

Robinsons Manila was built in 1980, on the site of the former Ateneo de Manila Campus and Assumption Convent located beside the University of the Philippines Manila and the Philippine General Hospital. Ateneo transferred to Loyola Heights, Quezon City, while the Convent relocated to San Lorenzo Village, Makati.

In June 2000, the mall was expanded with the opening of the Padre Faura Wing which contains additional shopping and dining facilities. It is also anchored by the construction of the 37-storey, twin tower residential condominium Robinsons Place Residences. Further demand in the market expanded the mall with the acquisition of the Manila Midtown Hotel in 2003, which was demolished it to make way for its Midtown Wing, which is also anchored by another residential condominium project the Adriatico Place Residences. Midtown wing opened in 2008. This expansion made the mall larger than Robinsons Galleria and therefore the largest Robinsons Mall.

In November 2018, plans were underway to renovate Robinsons Manila in 2019. The redevelopment is expected to be completed in 2026.

== Layout ==
=== Padre Faura Wing ===
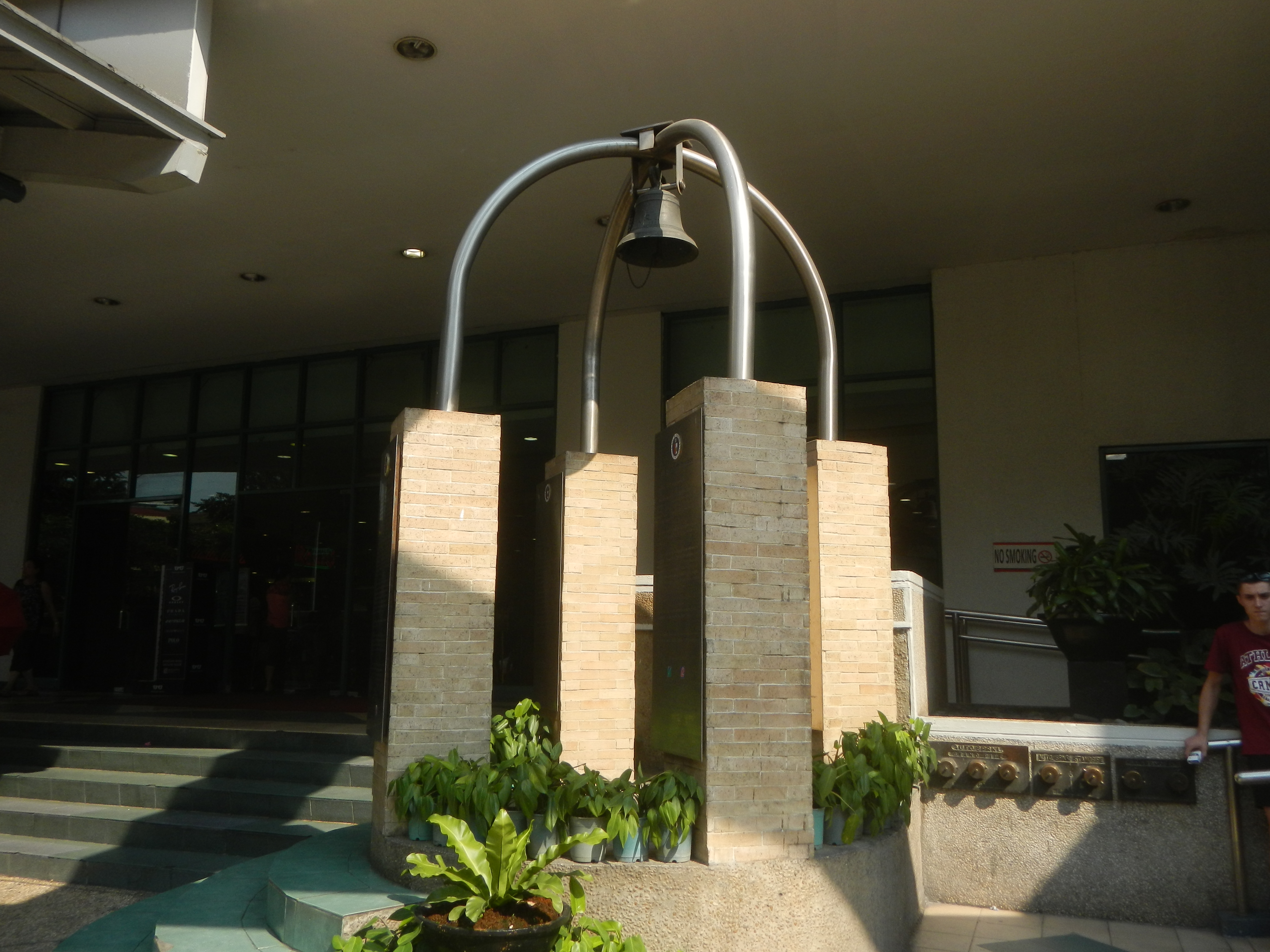
The historic Jesuit Bell which is on display at the Padre Faura entrance of the mall.

The two-level Padre Faura Wing faces Padre Faura Street and is connected to Robinsons Place Residences. The arrangement of its entry point, as well as the tower, makes the mall the focal point when traversing Maria Y. Orosa Avenue southwards. It is near the Philippine General Hospital, the Office of the University Registrar of UP Manila, as well as the Department of Justice, Court of Appeals, and the Supreme Court of the Philippines. The Jesuit Bell which was once located on the site of the former Manila Observatory is on permanent display at the entrance.

The wing is also home to Lingkod Pinoy Center, which hosts branches of government offices such as Professional Regulation Commission, Land Transportation Office, and clearance office of the National Bureau of Investigation. The mall's multilevel carpark entry ramp connects to the 3rd Level Carpark of the mall.

=== Midtown Wing ===
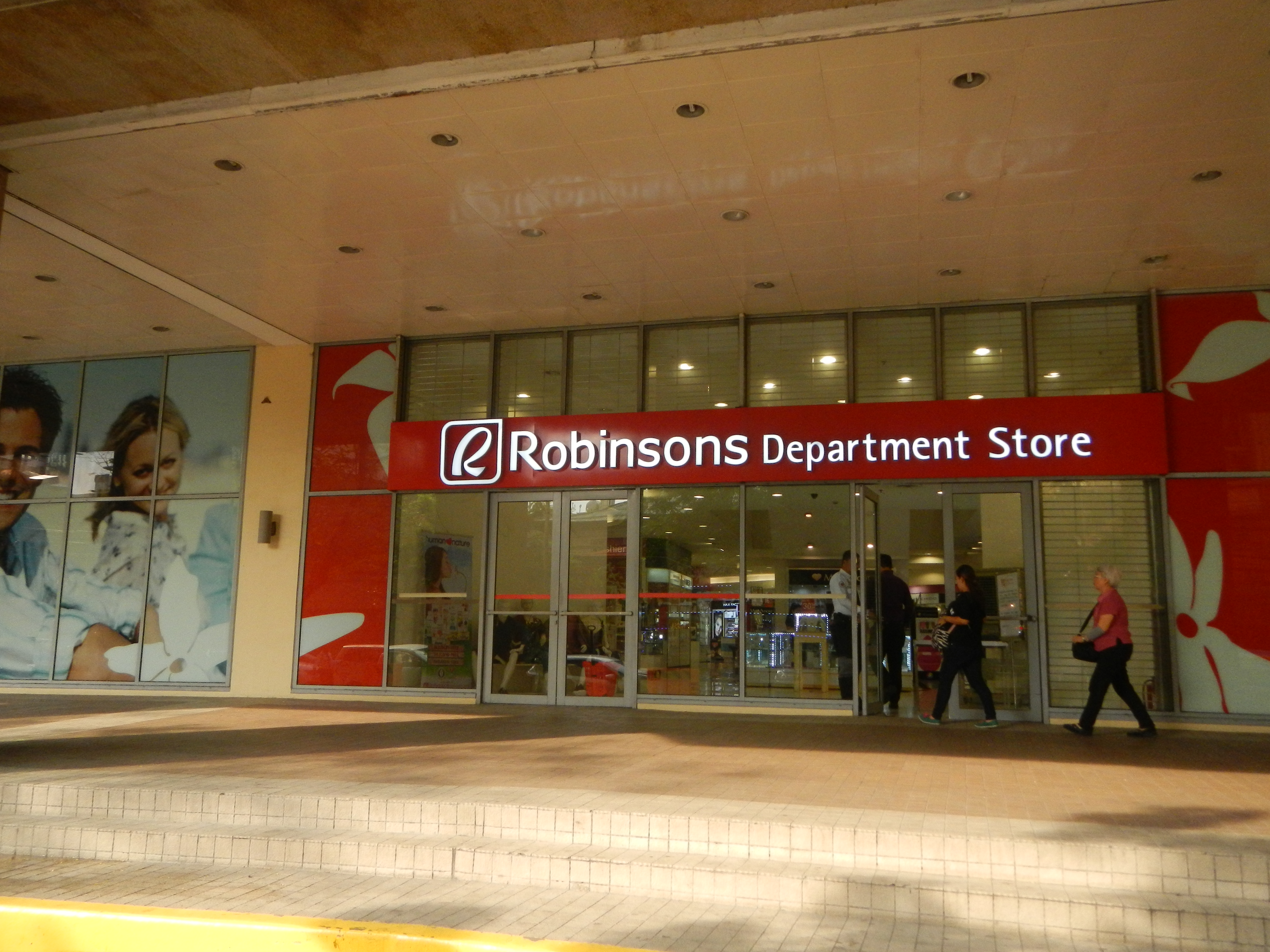
Robinsons Department Store, as seen from Adriatico Street, was the first part of the mall to be opened in 1980.

The Midtown Wing is the expansion of the original mall facing Adriatico Street. It was constructed on the adjacent lot located at the former Manila Midtown Hotel which was demolished to make way for this expansion. A lot of high-end shops and boutiques serves as its tenants. The Robinsons Department Store and its Business Center are located here. It is connected to Adriatico Place Residences, a triple tower residential condominium managed by RLC Residences.

Alongside shops and restaurants, it also features three additional cinemas, an expanded atrium, arcades such as Tom's World and Timezone, and an al fresco veranda. It has a basement parking shared with both Pedro Gil and Padre Faura Wings.

=== Pedro Gil Wing ===
One of the original structures of the mall, the Pedro Gil Wing faces Pedro Gil Street and features most of the mall's fashion brands including H&M, tech shops, sit-down restaurants, and the main wing of Robinsons Movieworld. The wing has a bowling center named Paeng's Midtown Bowl at the second level which closed in 2019 for renovations and reopened in January 2023. Timezone occupies a part of the bowling alley's space.

A family entertainment center named GBox (formerly Dreamtown) used to occupy a large space at the mall's food court area alongside Fitness First, which the former has been closed since 2012 and only a small area is currently operational, occupied by electronics repair shops and a branch of Jollyland.

== Gallery ==
The mall as seen from Pedro Gil street

View of the elevators and stalls

Mall's Pedro Gil wing

View of the floors, stalls

Another view of the stalls and floors

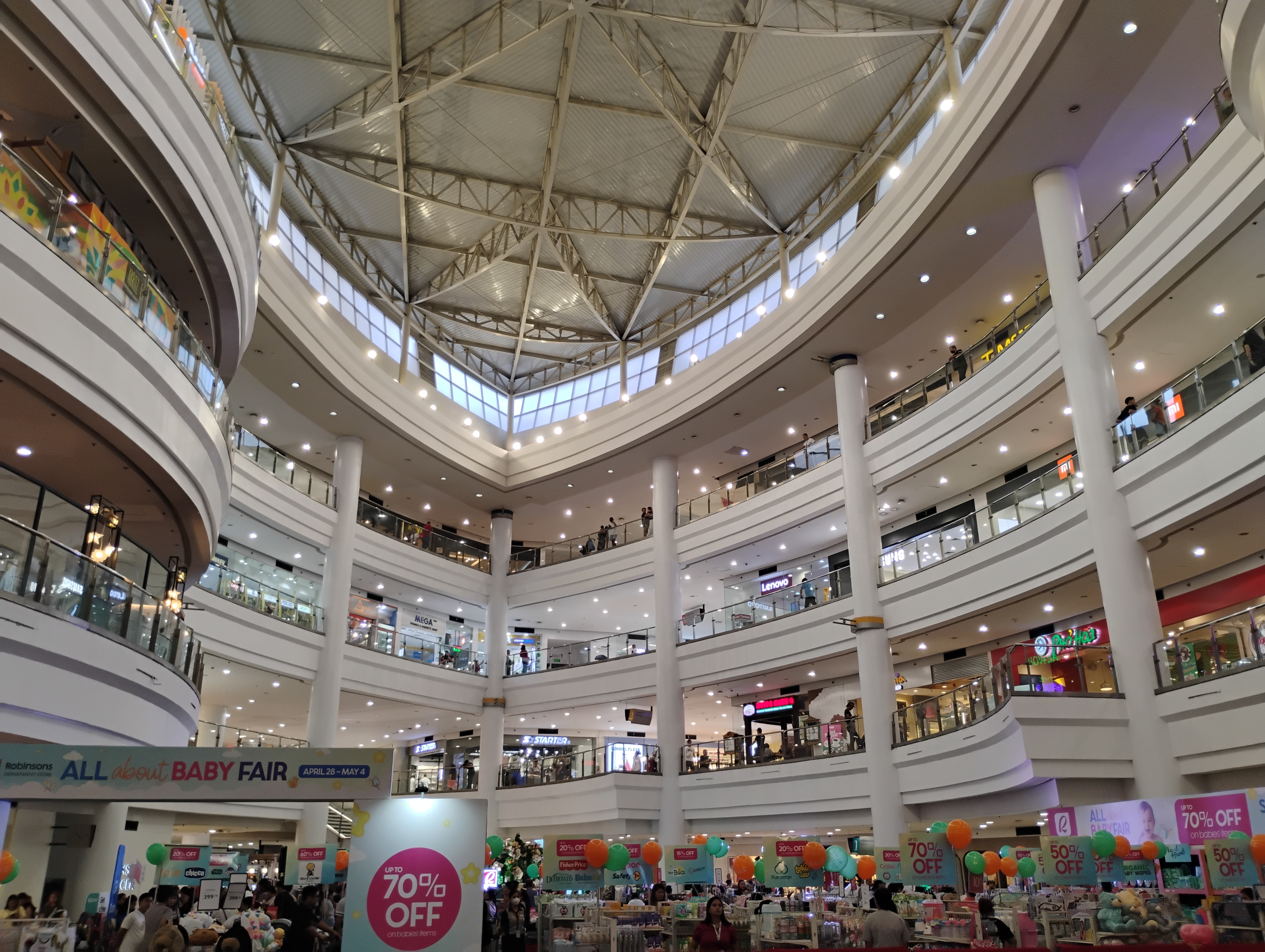
Interior of the Mall

Interior of the mall.

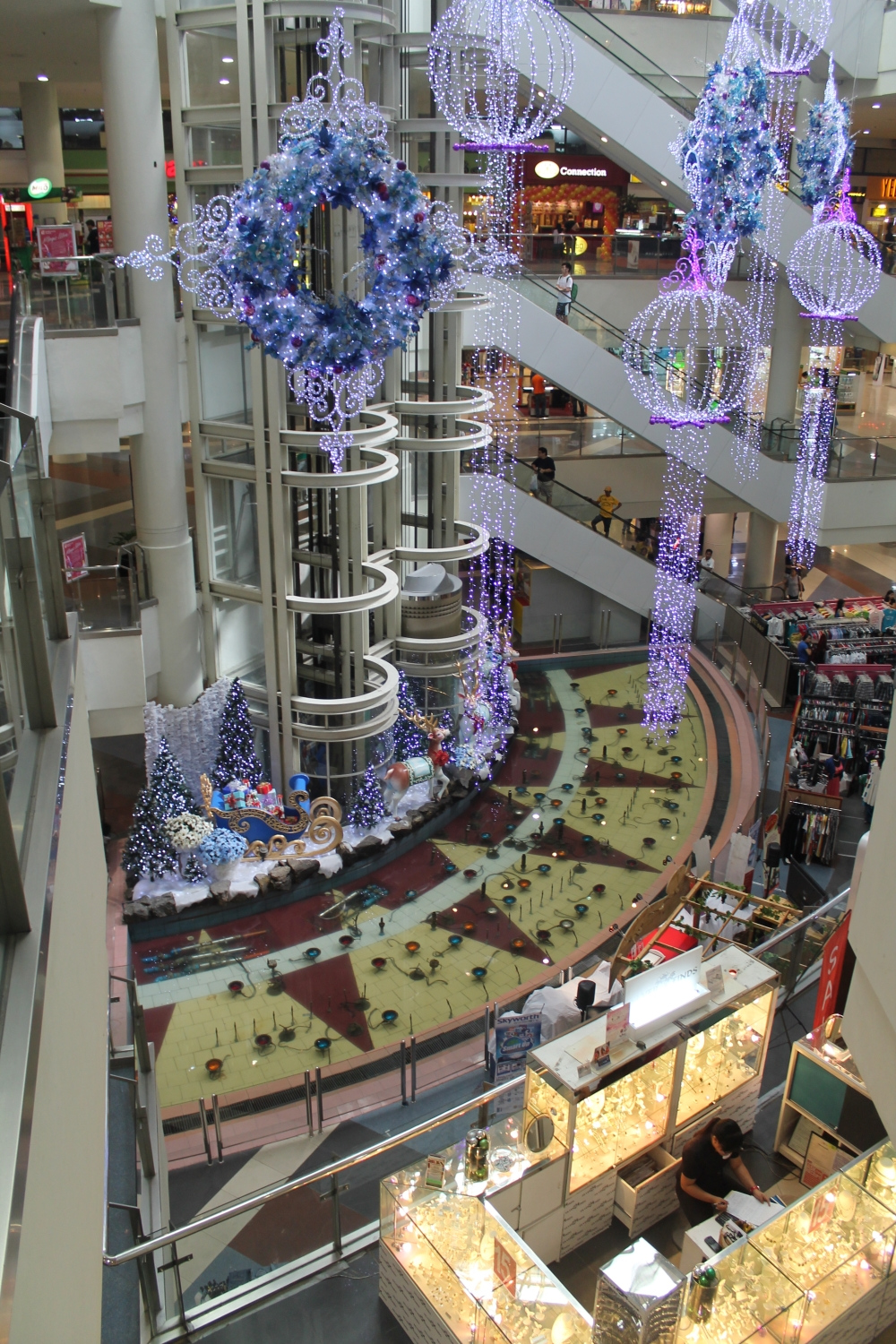
Christmas decorations at the Robinsons Manila's atrium. December 2013.

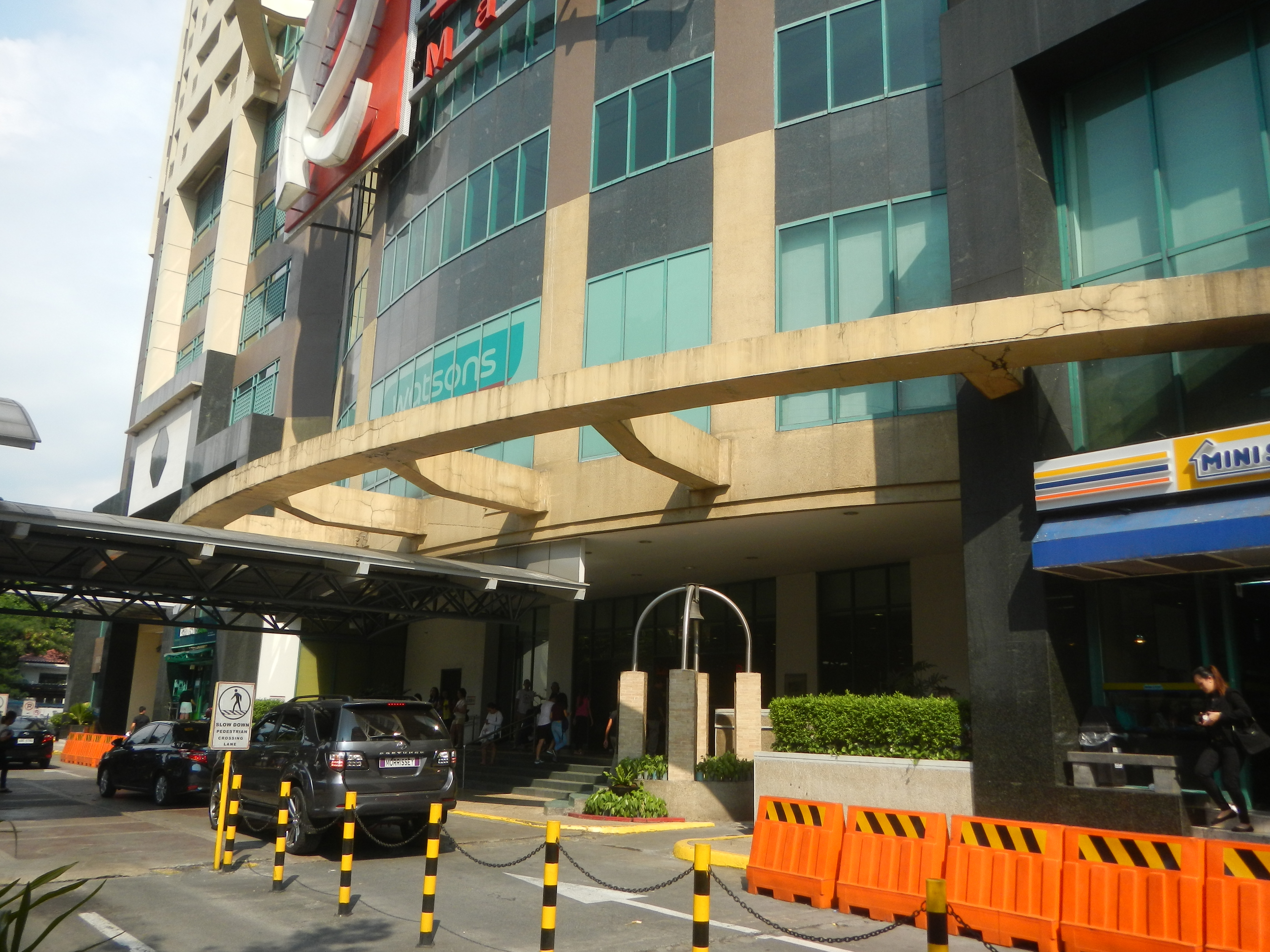
Entrance at Padre Faura Wing

The Adriatico Place Residences
