= Estremera =

Coordinates: 40°11′N 3°06′W

- Municipality
- Flag Coat of arms

- Municipal location within the Community of Madrid.
- Country: Spain
- Autonomous community: Community of Madrid

Area
  - Total: 30.54 sq mi (79.10 km^{2})

Population (2025-01-01)
  - Total: 1,473
- Time zone: UTC+1 (CET)
  - Summer (DST): UTC+2 (CEST)

Estremera is a municipality of the autonomous community of Madrid in central Spain. It belongs to the comarca of Las Vegas. The historic Church of Nuestra Señora de los Remedios stands in the town. The town is the site of Estremera Prison.

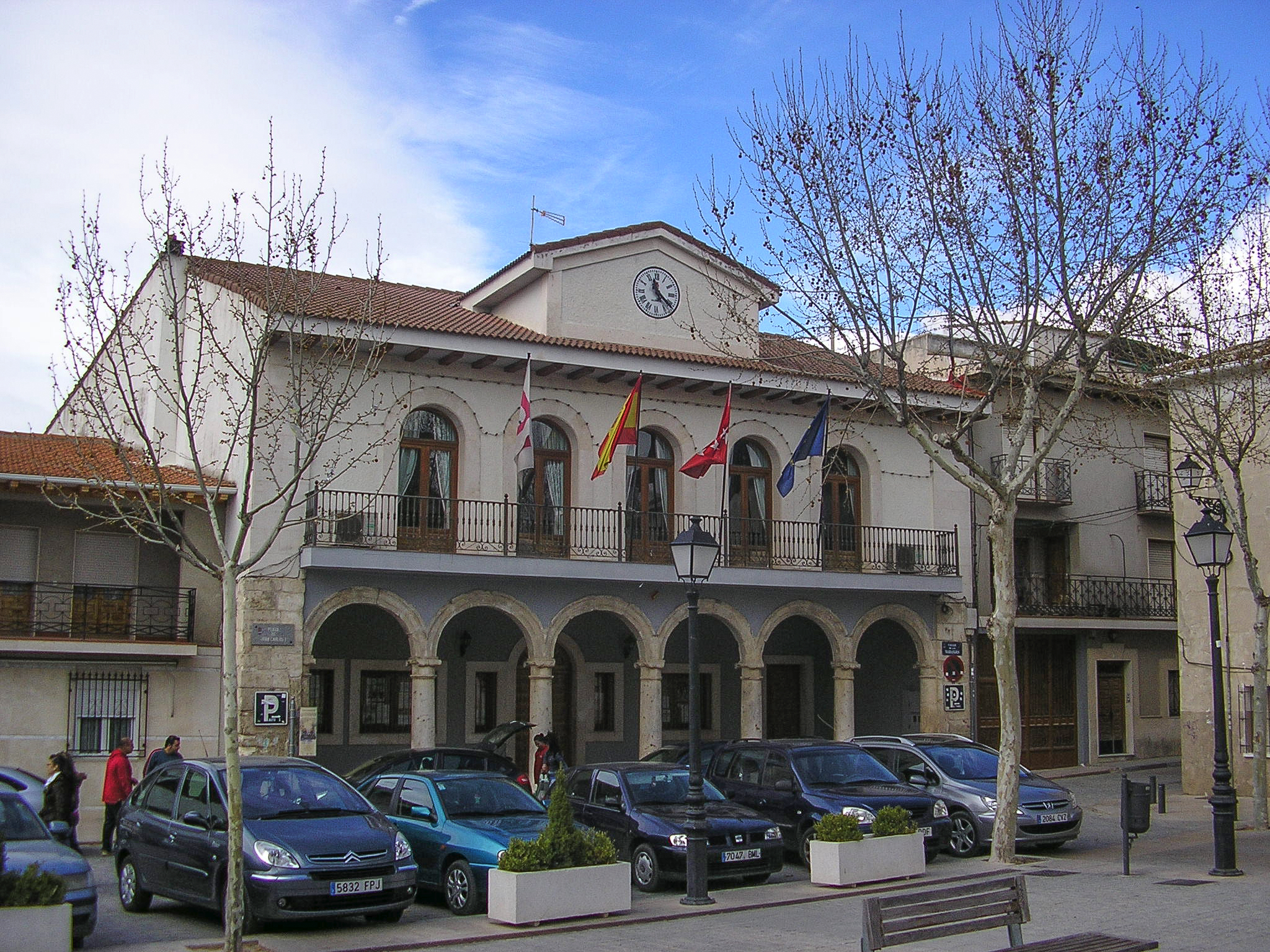
City Hall
