= Plaza Rajah Sulayman =

Public square in Malate, Manila

- Public square
- {{{other_names}}}
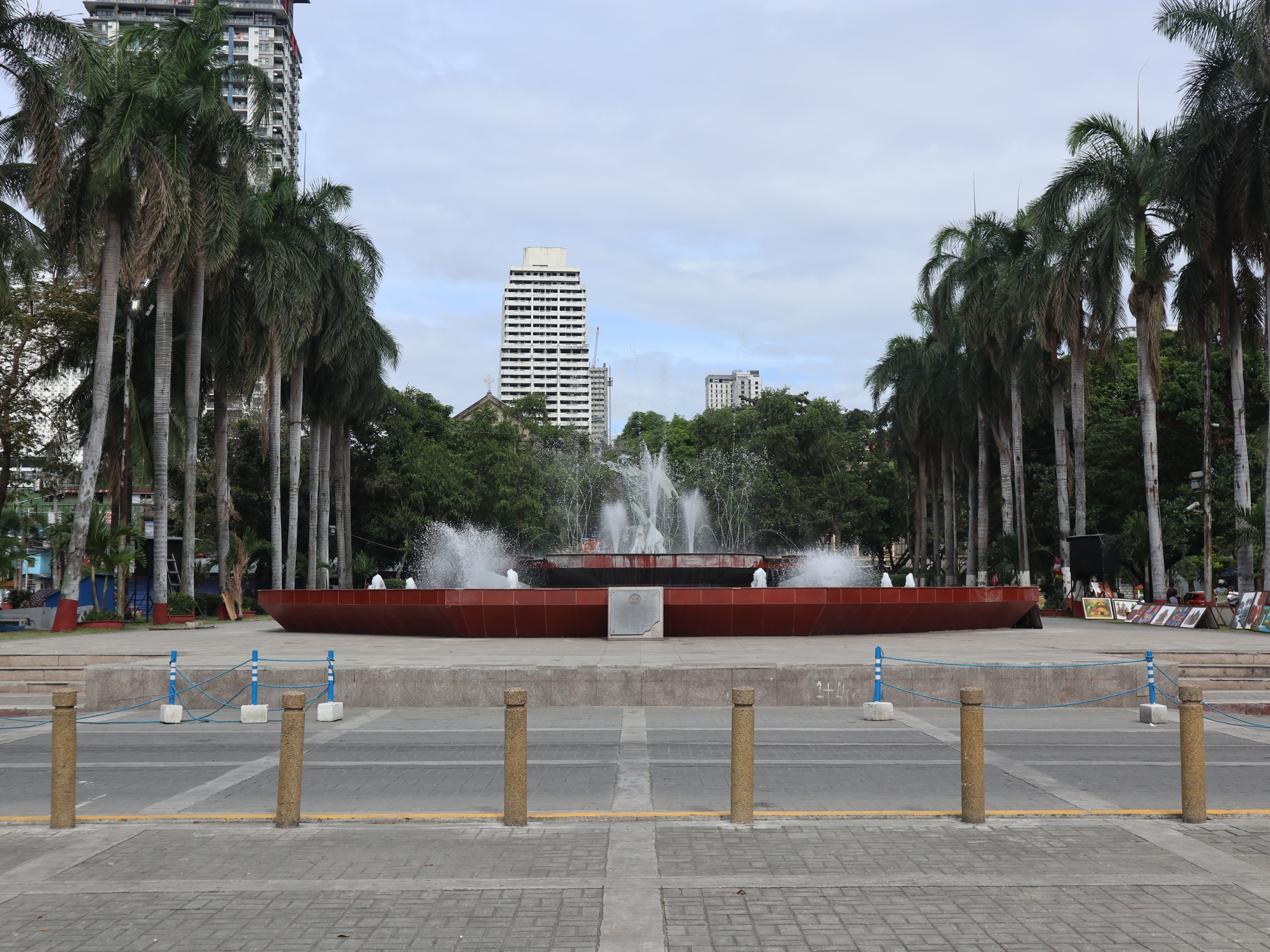
- Plaza Rajah Sulayman is the center of Malate, dominated by a statue of Rajah Sulayman
- Dedicated to: Rajah Sulayman
- Owner: City of Manila
- Location: Malate, Manila, Philippines
- Interactive map of Plaza Rajah Sulayman
- Coordinates: 14°34′08″N 120°59′01″E

Plaza Rajah Sulayman, also known as Rajah Sulayman Park, is a public square in Malate, Manila. It is bounded by Roxas Boulevard to the west, San Andres Street to the south, and Remedios Street to the north. The plaza is considered the center of Malate as it fronts the Malate Church, the main church of the district.

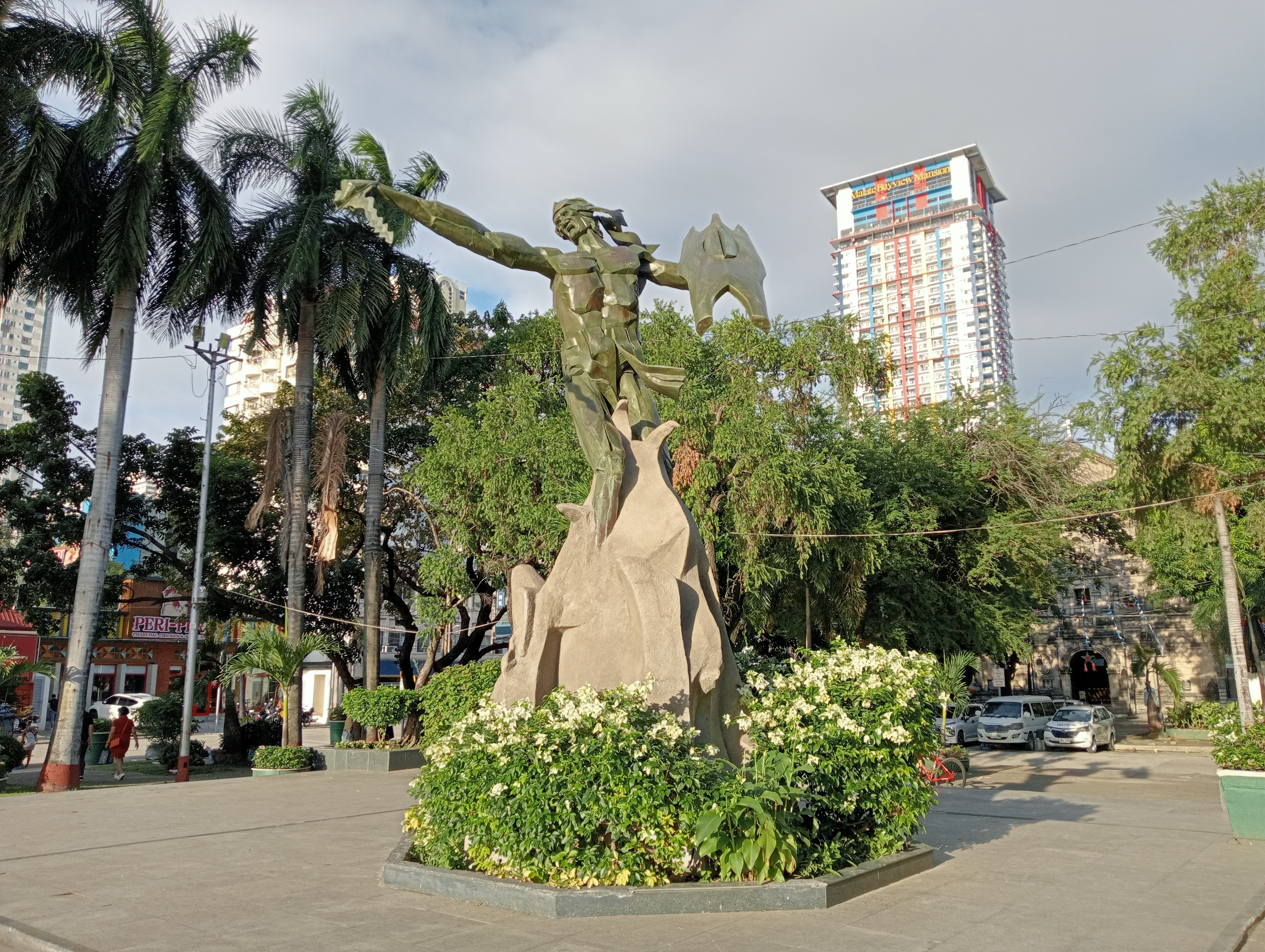
Rajah Sulayman Monument

The square is named after Rajah Sulayman, the late 16th-century sovereign of the Kingdom of Maynila. A statue of Rajah Sulayman sculpted by Eduardo Castrillo in 1976 is also located at the plaza.

== History ==
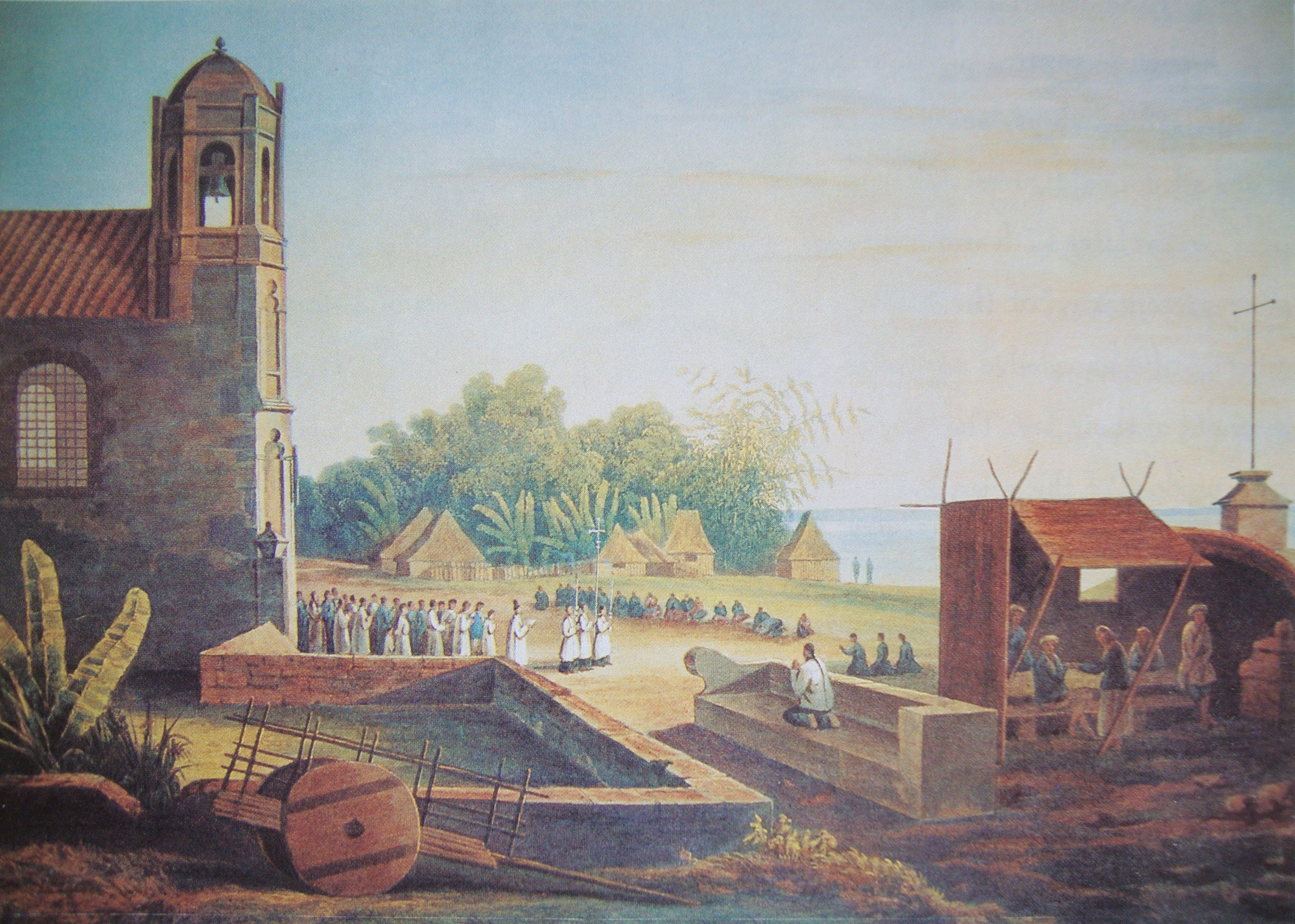
Malate Church and frontage (now Plaza Rajah Sulayman) in 1831

In Spanish colonial times, the plaza was a simple open field located between the shores of Manila Bay and the Malate Church, ending at a beach which used to be a popular bathing area. However, during American rule, the plaza was cut off from the coastline due to land reclamation works undertaken for the construction of what is now Roxas Boulevard. The plaza was last renovated in 2002, during the administration of Mayor Lito Atienza, as part of a citywide urban beautification program aimed at making Malate a prime tourist area, which involved the installation of a new dancing fountain. A large signaled pedestrian crossing connects the plaza to the Baywalk, which had been criticized for worsening traffic along Roxas Boulevard.

In part because of the 2002 renovations, Plaza Rajah Sulayman had been regarded as the new center of Malate nightlife, which traditionally is associated with the Remedios Circle further inland, as well as Manila's lovers' lane. The plaza is also regarded as a prime spot to watch the famous sunsets of Manila Bay. However, the election of Alfredo Lim as mayor of Manila in 2007 and his subsequent closure of establishments along the Baywalk—of which the plaza was considered a part—have put into question this reputation: columnist Ducky Paredes has noted that the closure of the Baywalk has done more harm for the city than good.

== Events ==
- GMA Network utilized the venue from 2004 to 2006, most especially for special episodes of SOP and its countdown television specials aired every New Year's Eve from Jive to '05 (2004–2005) to Cheers to '07 (2006–2007)
