= Los Remedios National Park =

Mexican national park

- IUCN category II (national park)
- Location within Mexico
- Location: Mexico State, Mexico
- Nearest city: Naucalpan
- Coordinates: 19°28′31″N 99°15′14″W
- Area: 400 hectares (990 acres)
- Established: 1938

Los Remedios National Park is a national park in Mexico, located in the far west of the municipality of Naucalpan in Mexico State, just northwest of Mexico City. The park was established by federal decree in 1938 with an area of 400 hectares (990 acres). Within its borders is the Sanctuary of the Virgin of Los Remedios, a colonial-era aqueduct and a pre-Hispanic archaeological zone with a Chichimeca temple. All of these are located in and around the mountain called Cerro Moctezuma. The site was an Aztec observatory and is also believed to be where Hernán Cortés and his men rested after fleeing Tenochtitlan.

== Overview ==
The aqueduct is 500 metres (1,600 ft) long and consists of fifty arches which measure 16 metres (52 ft) high and extend 1.7 metres (5.6 ft) into the ground. The first stage was built in 1616 under Viceroy of Mexico Diego Fernández de Córdoba with the objective of bringing water to the Sanctuary of Los Remedios from a spring at the village of San Francisco Chimalpa. This water was also used to irrigate fields in the villages of San Bartolomé, Santa Maria Nativitas and Santa Cruz. The aqueduct is mostly of clay pipes with two large spiral towers to release air. These towers flank the Sanctuary of the Virgin of Los Remedios and are nicknamed "caracoles" (snails). By 1764, the amount of water this system delivered was no longer enough and viceroy Joaquín de Monserrat had the arched system built, which was finished in 1765. Eventually, this system could not deliver water and became simply an architectural monument.

Due to the growth of the city of Naucalpan, severe pressure is being put on this national park. Seventy-five percent of the original surface area of the park now contains illegal settlements, including settlements which have been authorized by local authorities. While these settlements can be confiscated and destroyed under federal law, this has not happened. The federal environmental agency Profepa has received complaints about the most recent invasions into the park area, which have felled dozens of trees. The agency has responded with inspections of plans by a developer to build two subdivisions near the colonial-era aqueduct to verify if the land is private or public. One reason for this is that the park lacks conservation plans, fences and other means to fend off development efforts. The illegal settlements and development have also affected adjoining ejido land that adjoin the park. This and the fact that housing is now starting to encroach the archaeological zone has prompted the involvement of the National Institute of Anthropology and History (INAH) and the organization of neighboring communities to protest.
