= Church of Nuestra Señora de los Remedios (Estremera) =

Cultural property in Estremera, Spain

- Iglesia Parroquial de Nuestra Señora de los Remedios (Spanish)
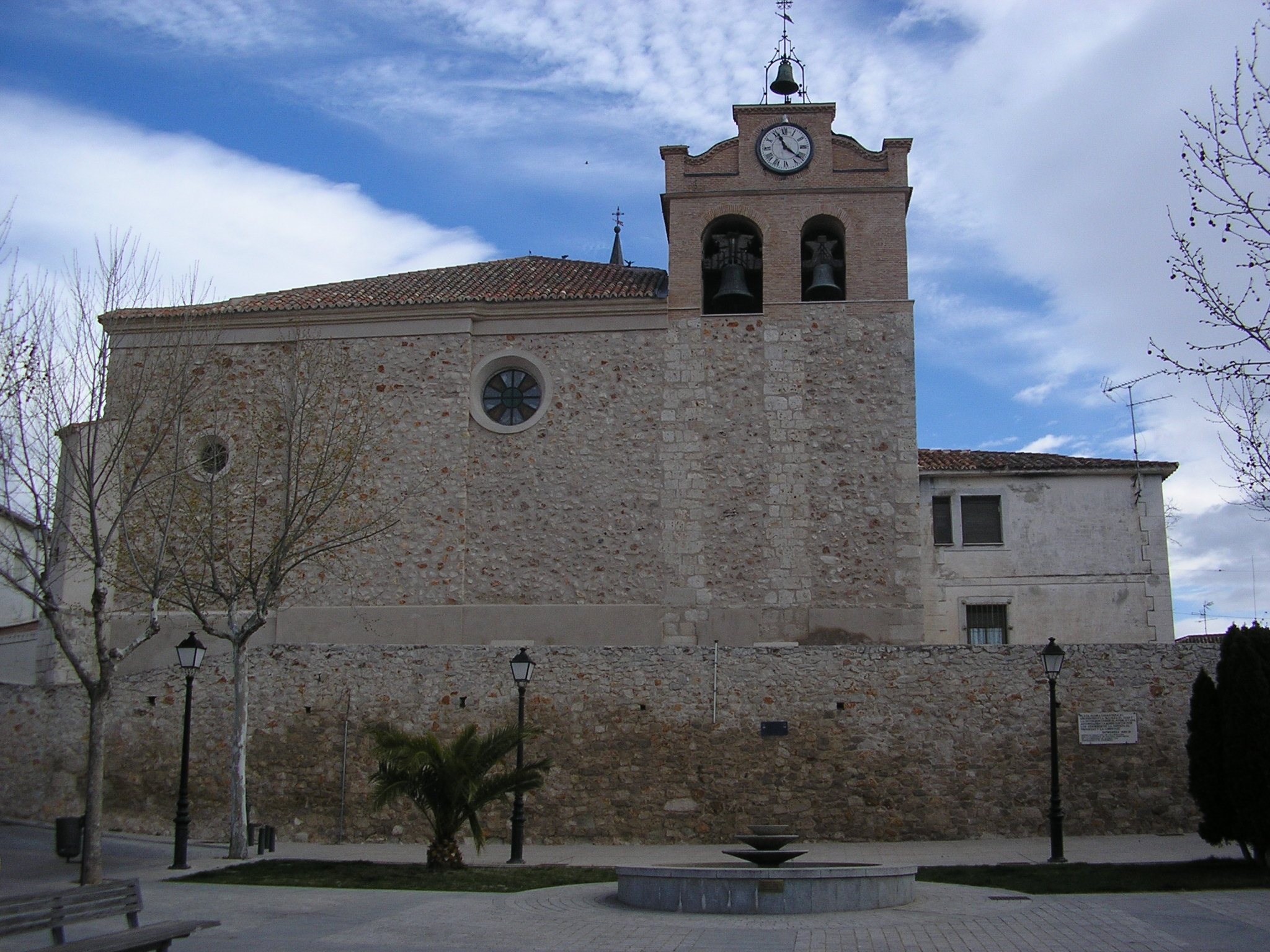

- Location within Spain
- 40.184704°N 3.105293°W
- Location: Estremera, Spain

Spanish Cultural Heritage
- Official name: Iglesia Parroquial de Nuestra Señora de los Remedios
- Type: Non-movable
- Criteria: Monument
- Designated: 1982
- Reference no.: RI-51-0004641

The Church of Nuestra Señora de los Remedios (Spanish: Iglesia Parroquial de Nuestra Señora de los Remedios) is a church located in Estremera, Spain. It was declared Bien de Interés Cultural in 1982.
