= Malate Church =

Roman Catholic church in Manila, Philippines

- Our Lady of Remedies Parish
- Iglesia Parroquial de Malate (Spanish); Parroquia Nuestra Señora de los Remedios (Spanish)
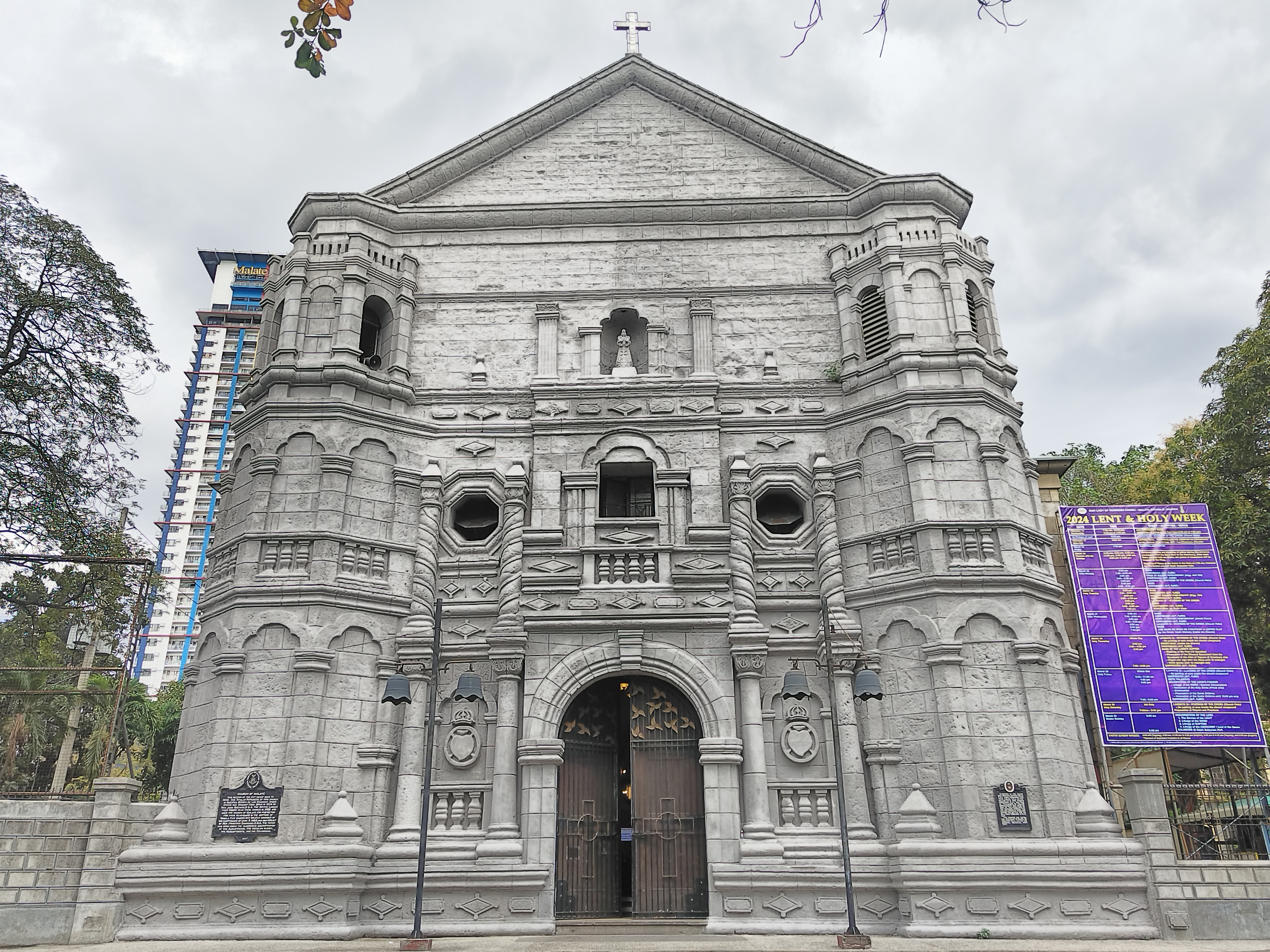
- Malate Church façade in February 2024
- Malate Church
- 14°34′10″N 120°59′05″E
- Location: Malate, Manila
- Country: Philippines
- Denomination: Roman Catholic
- Religious institute: Columbans
- Website: Malate Church

History
- Status: Parish church
- Founded: 1588
- Dedication: Nuestra Señora de los Remedios
- Dedicated: 1624

Architecture
- Functional status: Active
- Heritage designation: Important Cultural Property
- Designated: April 22, 2023
- Architectural type: Church building
- Style: Baroque; Neo-Mudéjar
- Completed: 1864

Specifications
- Materials: stone, sand, gravel, cement, mortar, steel

Administration
- Archdiocese: Manila
- Deanery: Nuestra Señora de Guia
- Parish: Our Lady of Remedies

Clergy
- Archbishop: Jose Advincula
- Priest(s): Rev Fr. Leonito Distor, MSSC

Our Lady of Remedies Parish (Filipino: Parokya ng Mahal na Birhen ng mga Remedios), commonly known as Malate Church (Note: Filipino: Simbahan ng Malate; Spanish: Iglesia de Malate), is a Roman Catholic parish church in the district of Malate in the city of Manila, Philippines. It is under the jurisdiction of the Archdiocese of Manila. This Filipino Islamic Mudejar and Mexican Baroque-style church is overlooking Plaza Rajah Sulayman and, ultimately, Manila Bay. The church is dedicated to Nuestra Señora de los Remedios, the patroness of childbirth. A revered statue of the Virgin Mary under this title was brought from Spain in 1624, and is currently enshrined at the high altar.

Malate used to be known as Maalat due to the saline waters of the Bay fronting it; and as Laguio or Lagunoi, after the street which separated it from Ermita.

== History ==
=== Foundation ===
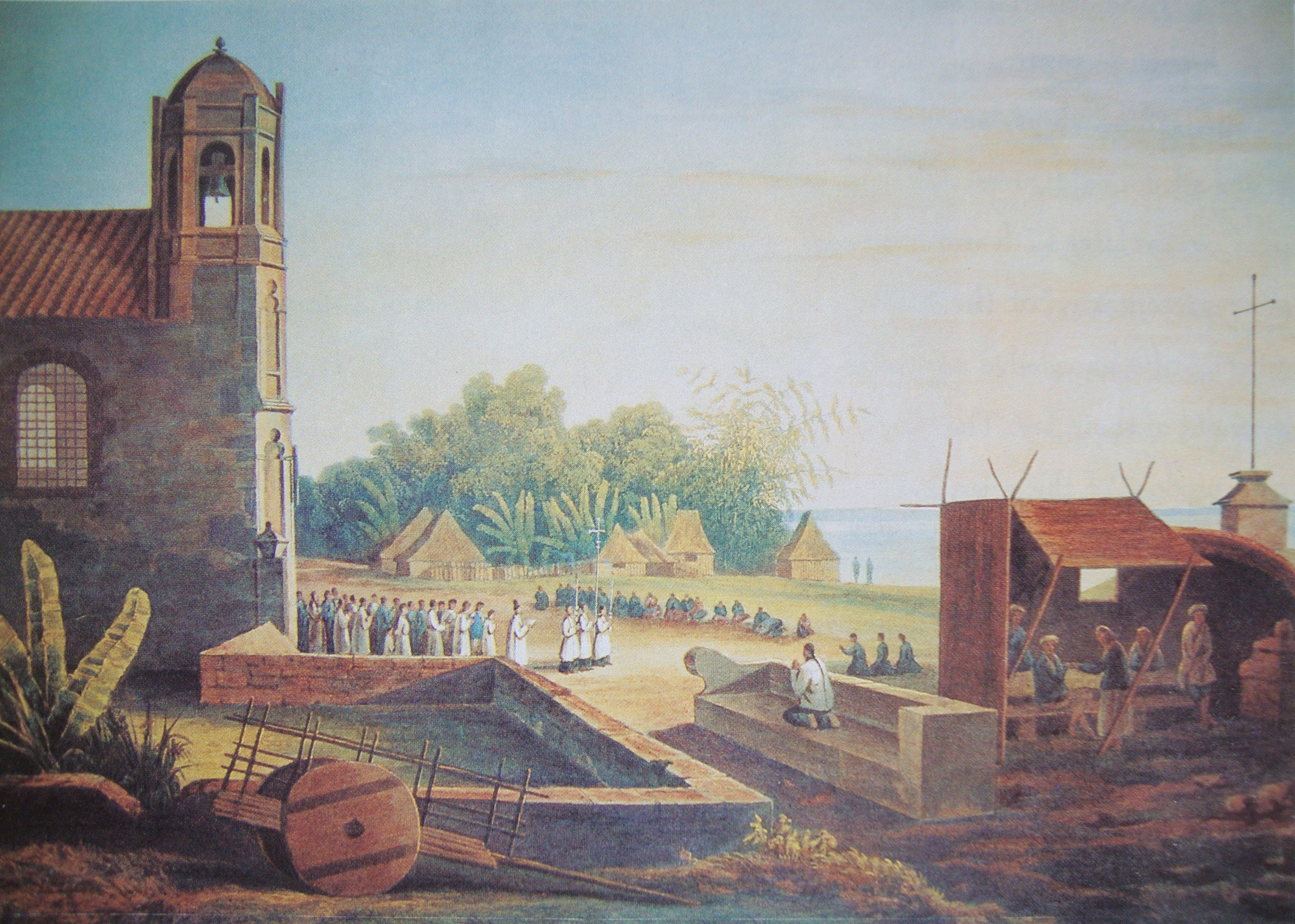
View of Malate Church in 1831 as seen by French Captain Cyrille Pierre Théodore Laplace

The Augustinian Chapter held on September 18, 1581, accepted the house of Maalat as a house of the Order under the name of Lagunoi, and the advocation of the Conception of Our Lady (Immaculate Conception). In the Chapter held on May 17, 1590, three resident priests of the monastery of San Agustín (Manila) were charged with the care of the natives of Malate; they were Frs. Alfonso de Castro, Diego Muñoz, and Ildefonso Gutiérrez. The report of the Father Provincial of 1591 reveals that the house of Malate together with Lagunoi had 1,200 persons, convent and church. In 1639, the convent of Malate contributed to the patriotic campaign of Governor-General Sebastián Hurtado de Corcuera, former governor of Panamá, who brought Peruvian soldiers as well as Panamanians and Genoese to fight against Muslim pirates, with a donation of two bells of seven arrobas and seven libras (approx. 154 kg. & 220 g.).

In 1624, Fr. Juan de Guevara brought from Andalucía, Spain, the image of the Virgen de los Remedios which was said to be miraculous. It “had graceful features”, says San Agustín, “was half vara high (417 mm.) and slightly brown”. Fr. Castro's version is different: “I saw the image a thousand times,” he wrote, “but she never looked brown to me, but rather white with hands and face of white ivory.” The devotion to the Virgen de los Remedios made Malate a renowned shrine. People flocked to venerate the image, especially on Saturdays, with women presenting their babies to the Virgin.

Except for a short time, Malate was always administered by the Augustinians. The priest of Malate also ministered to neighbouring Ermita from 1591 to 1610, since the two barrios had been united by Governor-General Gómez Pérez Dasmariñas with the approval of Bishop Domingo de Salazar, O.P. Pasay was separated from Malate under the name of Pineda on May 17, 1863. Malate was also a place of recreation for the residents of the Walled City and long a meeting place for noblemen, Tagalogs and their kings like Rajah Matanda and Rajah Soliman. It easily became “the most aristocratic barrio of Manila where Spaniards and mestizos dwelt”.

=== Construction ===
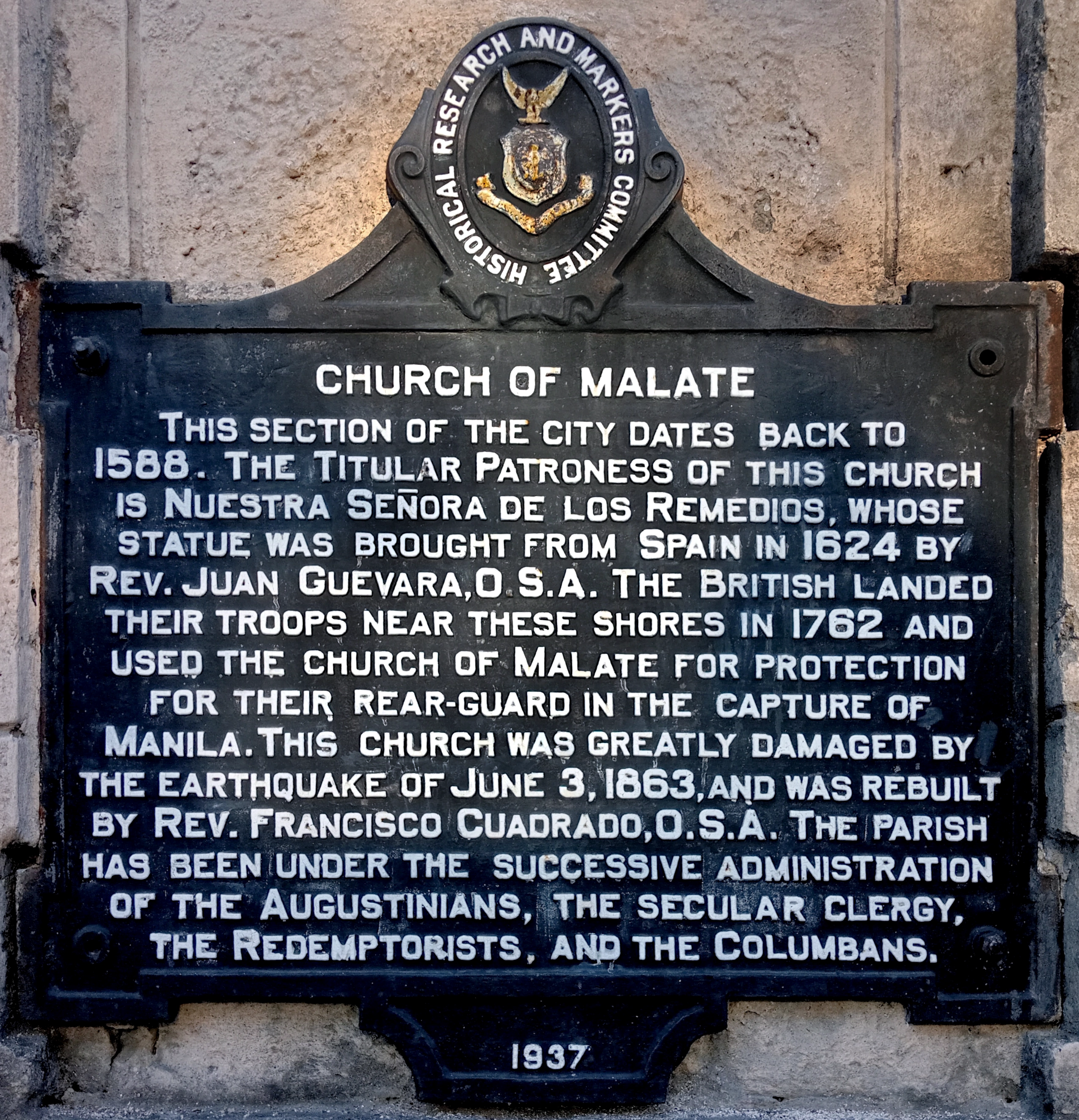
Church HRMC historical marker installed in 1937

In 1591, Malate had only one church and one convent. The church and convent dedicated to the Nativity of Our Lady (Conception) were damaged heavily by the 1645 Luzon earthquake. San Agustín describes the latter as “a magnificent work of arches and stone”. In 1667, both structures were demolished on orders of Governor-General Sabiniano Manrique de Lara due to the threat posed by the pirate Koxinga.

In 1669, the father provincial placed the convent of Malate under his immediate care and authorized the prior to use the “repository of alms for the dead” for the construction of the buildings. Fr. Dionisio Suárez began construction on the second church and convent made of bricks and stone in 1677–1679. It was completed by Fr. Pedro de Mesa in 1680.

In 1721, the convent was in ruinous condition, and the coffers of the house empty. The father provincial sent a circular to the various ministries of the Tagalogs available. Furthermore, the convent was relieved of the obligation to pay rent to San Agustín Monastery. The money raised amounted only to 400 pesos, just enough to buy the materials. The construction work proceeded very slowly because the prior depended almost completely on funds of the provincial.

During the British occupation of Manila in 1762, the British occupied the church and turned it into their headquarters. Serious damage was inflicted on the structure. There are no records as to who restored the buildings after the British left. A typhoon on June 3, 1868, destroyed the church.

Fr. Francisco Cuadrado constructed the third church, the present one, in 1864 almost in its entirety except for the façade. Cuadrado, then the parish priest, started the reconstruction. The “just one”, as he was called by his parishioners, toured the city and nearby provinces to raise the necessary funds. His efforts paid off as he collected more than what he needed. Thus, he was known for gathering the poor fishermen of his parish and sharing with them his “savings”.

There was some restoration work under Fr. Nicolás Dulanto who was also responsible for the completion of the upper part of the façade between 1894 and 1898. The next decades saw the church attract more devotees. The old convent was demolished in 1929, with Fr. Gary Cogan building a new one in 1930. One of the remaining bells displayed at the entrance of the new convent has this inscription: "Nuestra Señora de los Remedios. Se fundio en 30 de Enero de 1879."

During the Japanese occupation in the Second World War, both the church and the convent, including all the records, were burnt down, leaving only the walls. The Japanese had earlier abducted Fathers Kelly, Henaghan, Monaghan, and Fallon, plus other parishioners, all never to be seen again. Towards the war's end in 1945, the church and convent were left in complete ruins, and its records reduced to ashes.

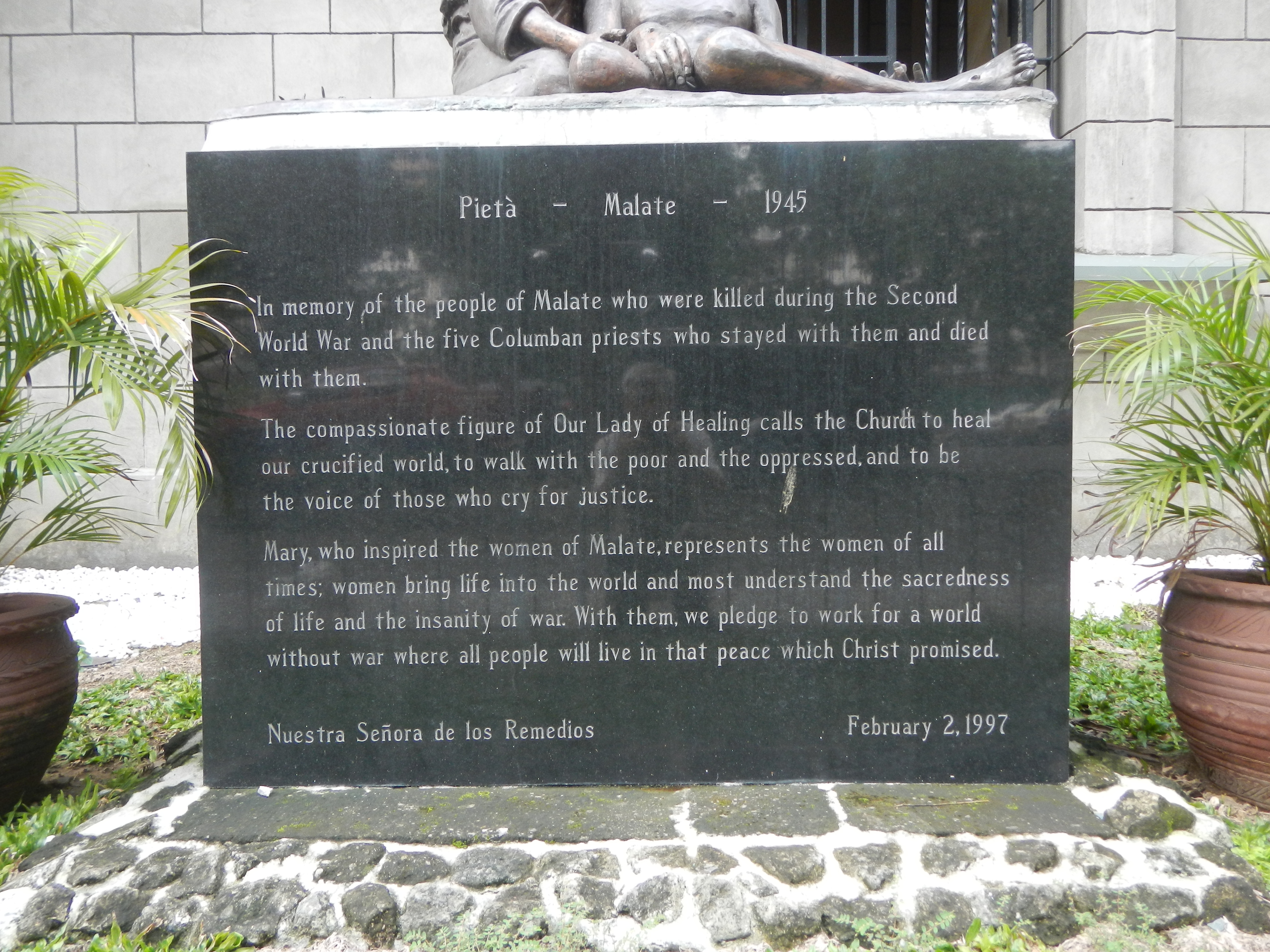
Memorial marker

Rebuilding the church was undertaken by the Columban Fathers during the 1950s. They rebuilt the roof, altar, dome, and transept while the interior was painted. The bricks and the stone outside were returned to their pristine color in 1978.

On April 22, 2023, the National Museum of the Philippines declared the church an Important Cultural Property.

== Architecture ==
Malate Church is one of only two nationwide with twisted columns and in effect a retablo-type façade, the other being the Franciscan Daraga Church in Albay.

If Santa Ana was the summer resort by the Pasig River from the 17th to the 19th centuries, Malate was its counterpart by Manila Bay. Seaside villas beautified the place as a virtual college town emerged, with St. Scholastica's College and De La Salle College on the south, University of the Philippines and Ateneo Municipal on Padre Faura Street on the north and some, other private schools within the boundaries of the barrio.

Malate Church was considered to be a dangerous stronghold if captured by enemy forces, as stone churches outside Intramuros can be a convenient cover. When the British occupied Manila in 1762 they operated from the church's tower and Manila was subsequently sacked.

=== Exterior ===
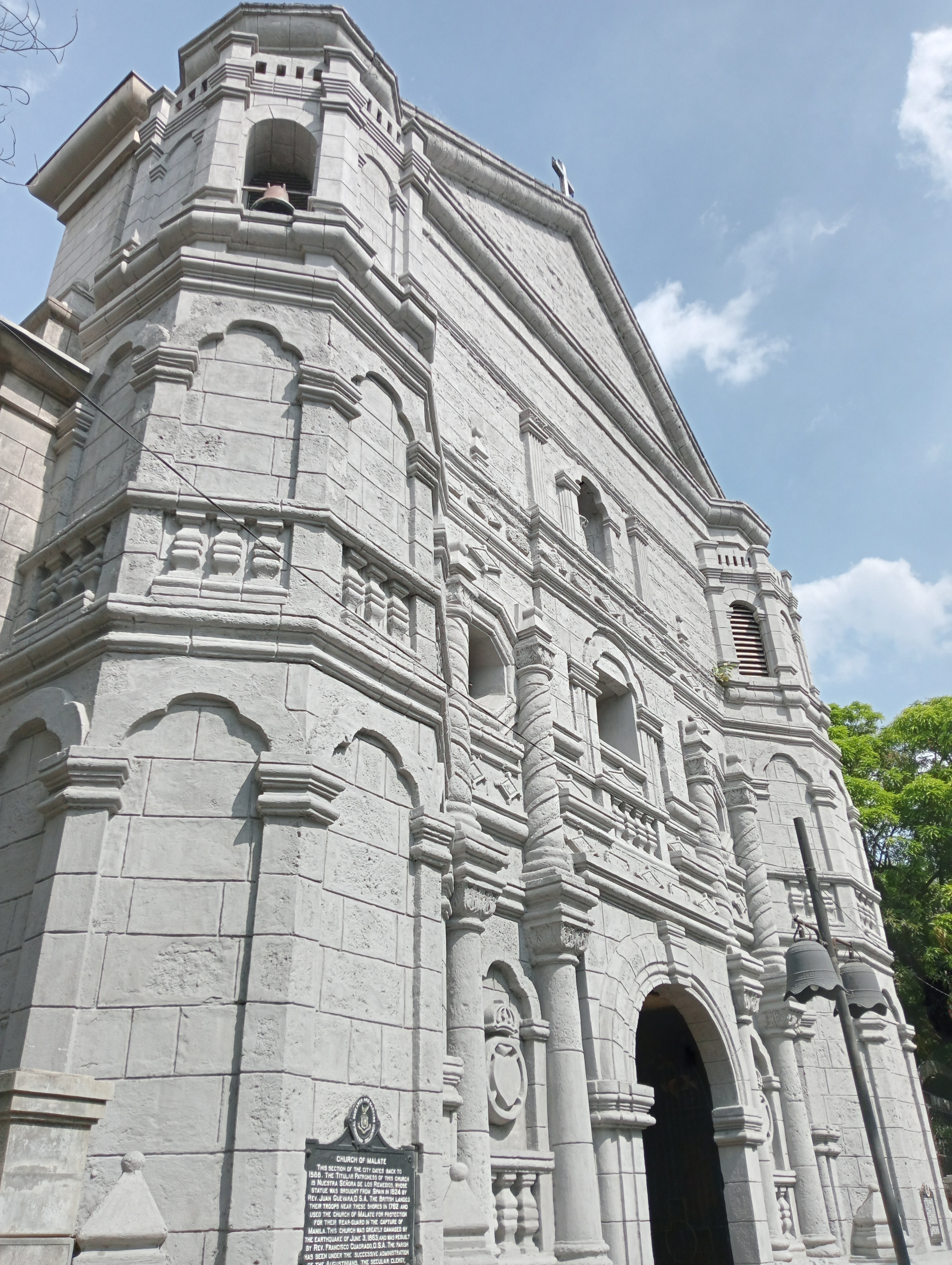

There is interplay of Muslim design and Mexican Baroque. Says one writer, “it is in the design of the facade where the significance of the Malate Church lies”. The juxtaposition of Mexican Baroque and Muslim design has resulted in an interesting colonial style, “mudejarisimo Filipino”, wrote Alice Coseteng in her book, Spanish Churches in the Philippines.

The central, rectangular body of the three-storey façade is flanked by two projecting cylindrical buttresses, shaped into half-embedded hexagonal forms, converted from bell towers with the third tier as belfries. The embellishments on the stone surface are worked onto the natural surface, making it appear as if the ornamentation had emerged on the surface as a holistic part of the design. The Augustinian symbol, the flaming heart, is carved on both sides of the entrance. Bells hang from the uppermost part of the now-side buttresses. The illusion of solidity and height are from the twisted columns, a popular feature in Mexican Baroque and used extensively in retablos but seldom on façades. The combination of Romanesque columns on the first storey, the twisted columns on the second, and the blind balusters are clearly Baroque. The plain pediment suggests a Renaissance style of architecture.

The design of the church façade is unusual with the use of trefoil blind arches which clearly indicate Moorish influence. The large opening of the lower level is balanced by the blind trefoil openings of the second, and the semi-circular niche of the third. Laid out across the tiers like cornices are diamond and rectangular designs, as well as the shallow, ornamental relief work suggestive of Islamic art. Few openings suggest massiveness, while the bell towers give an impression of solidity and strength in “squeezing” the middle part of the façade.

=== Interior ===
Enshrined above the high altar is the small statue of Our Lady of Remedios, brought from Spain in 1624. This image is popular with mothers who have sick children; they manifest their devotion by lighting special candles and pouring private petitions to the Virgin.

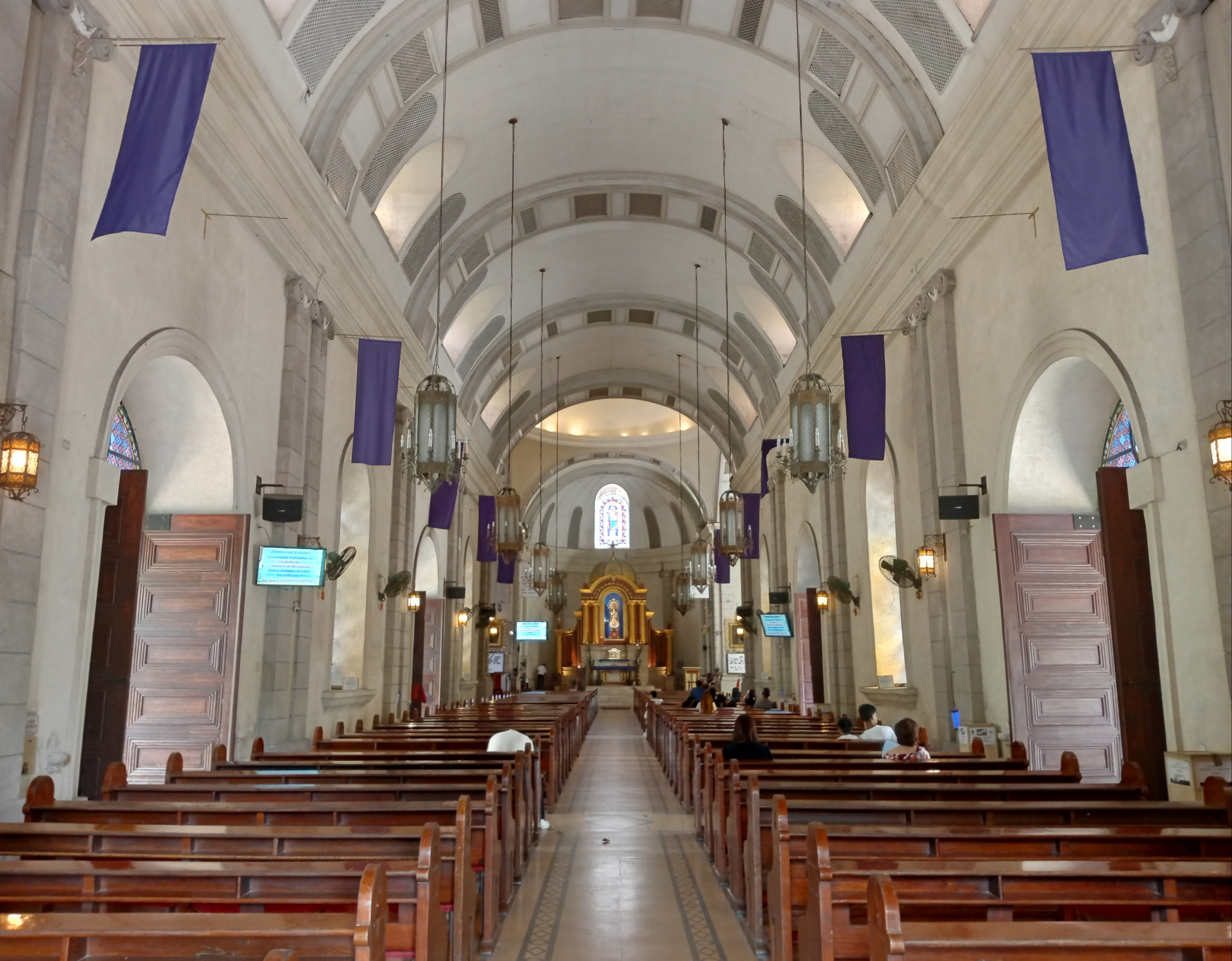
Church interior in 2024

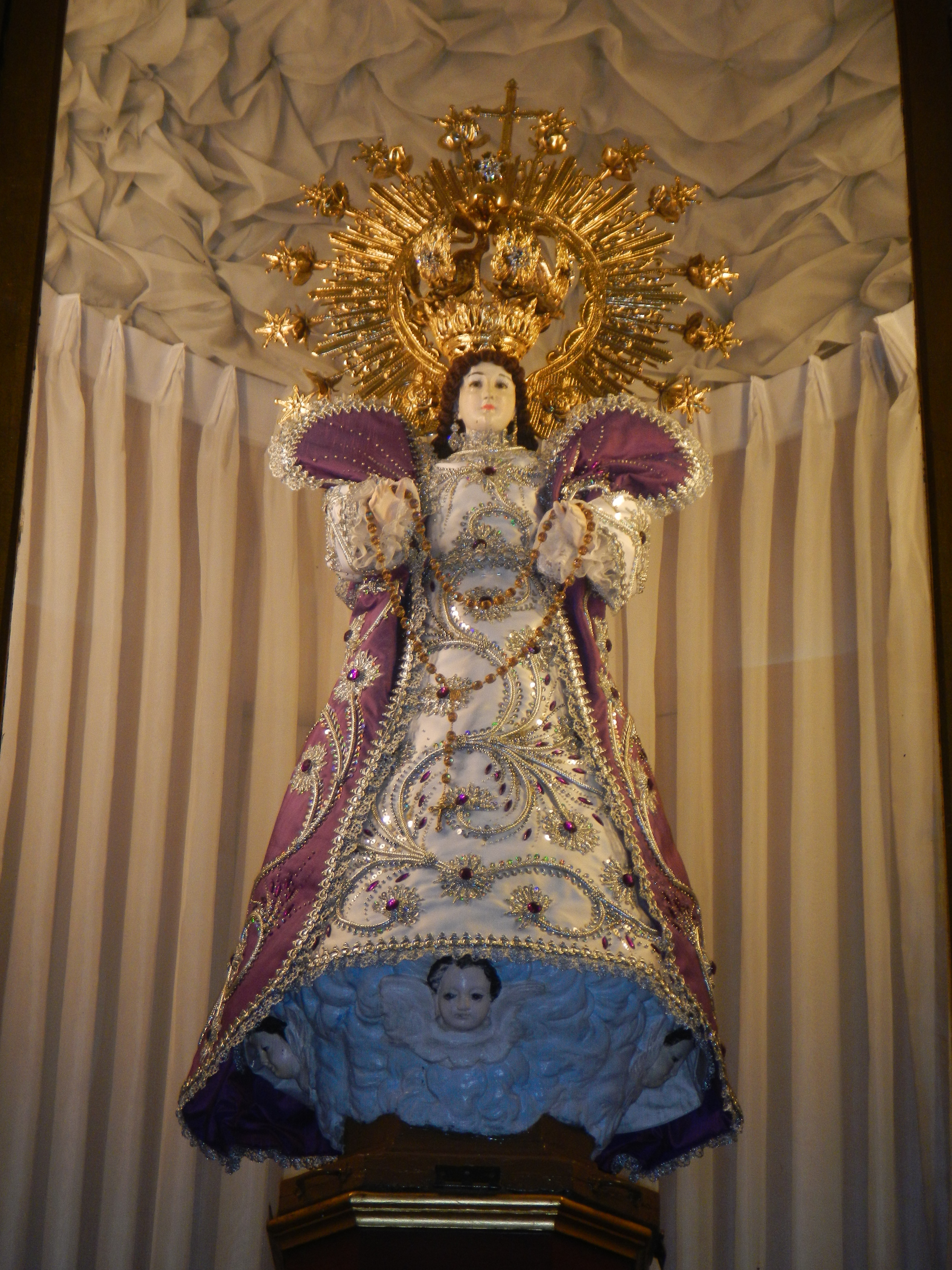
Nuestra Señora de Remedios

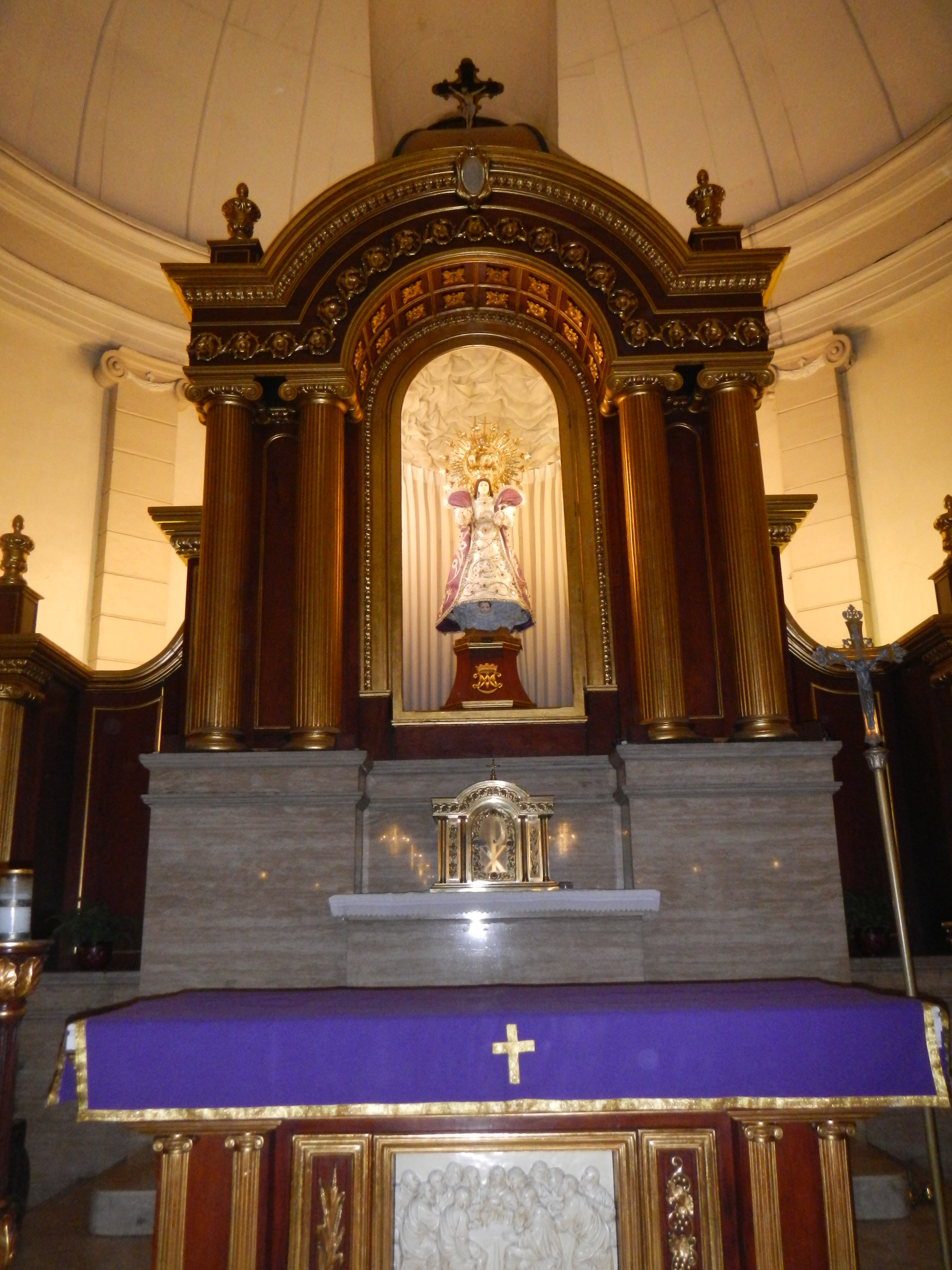
Church sanctuary
