= Ella del Rosario =

Filipina singer

- Also known as: Ella del Rosario
- Born: Angela del Rosario; Manila, Philippines
- Occupations: Singer, actress, celebrity
- Instruments: Vocals, piano, guitar
- Years active: 1974–1998
- Labels: Villar, Victor, Canary
- Formerly of: Hotdog

Angela del Rosario, known as Ella del Rosario, is a Spanish-Filipina American celebrity and multi-awarded lead singer who marqueed and collaborated with the wildly popular famous band Hotdog from 1974–1984.

== Early career ==
del Rosario was discovered by the late Garcia brothers, Rene and Dennis, and was subsequently recruited for the band Hotdog in 1974. She was a part of the band until 1977.

== Later career ==
del Rosario quit the band Hotdog and later became a solo artist around 1979. She went on to become one of the most popular OPM Pop singers, singing the iconic popular song, "Mr. Disco", in 1979.

del Rosario quit singing in 1984, however, she has continued to perform her hits throughout the years.

== Discography ==
=== Albums ===
- Mr. Disco (1979 PolyEast Records "formerly Canary Records then OctoArts International. & OctoArts-EMI Music")

=== Singles ===
- "Pabulong" (1977)
- "Mr. Disco" (1979)
- "Hahabol-Habol" (1979)
- "Sabik na Sabik" (1979)

=== Covers ===
- "Mr. Disco"
  - Manilyn Reynes (1991)
  - Maja Salvador (2006)
  - Zsara (2022)
