= Adriatico Street =

Road in Manila, Philippines

Coordinates: 14°34′8″N 120°59′12″E

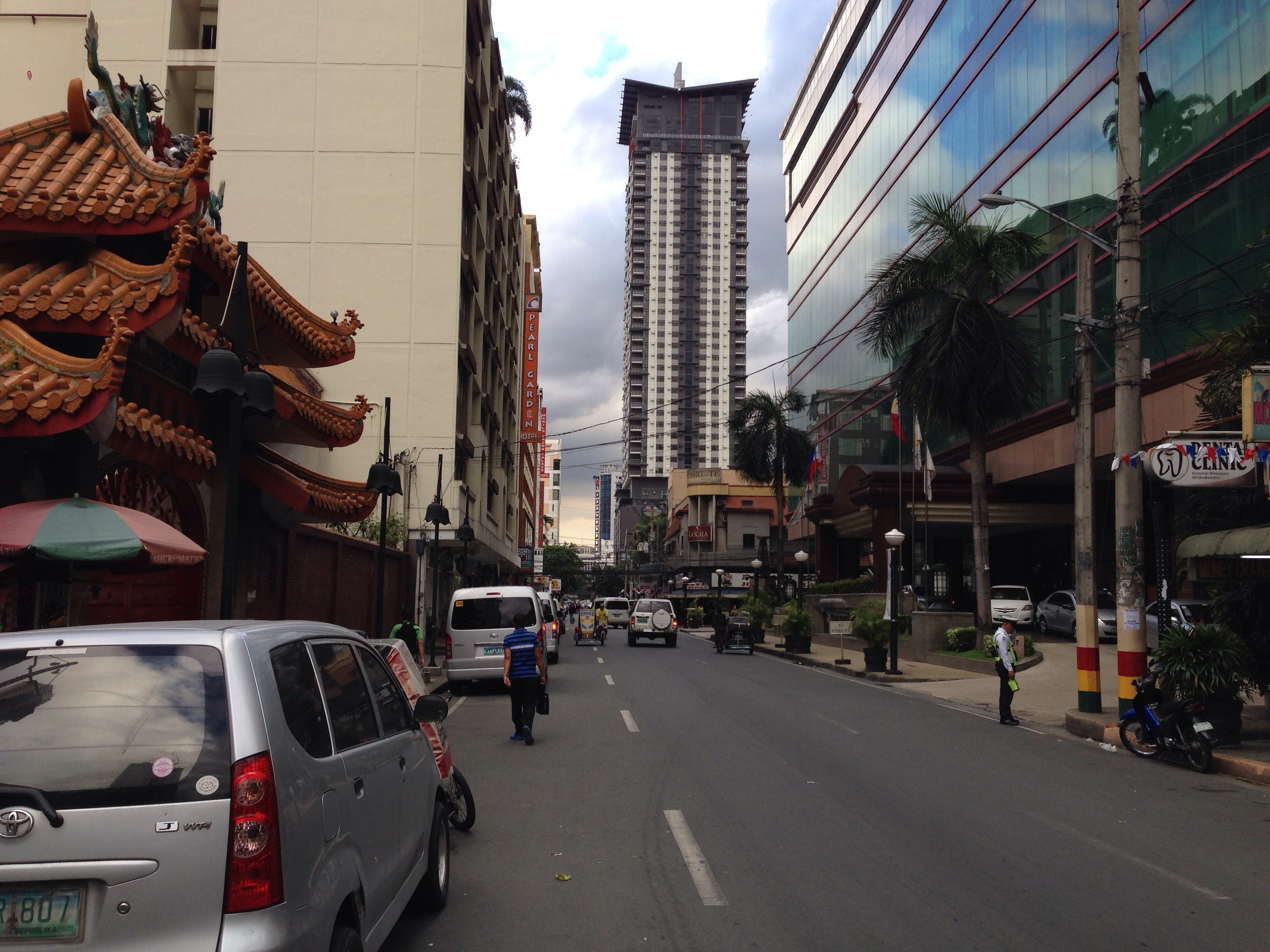
- Looking south towards Remedios Circle in Malate
- Interactive map of Adriatico Street
- Former name: Dakota Street
- Namesake: Macario Adriatico; The Dakotas (formerly)
- Maintained by: Department of Public Works and Highways – South Manila District Engineering Office
- Length: 2.17 km (1.35 mi)
- Location: Manila
- From: Padre Faura Street in Ermita
- Major junctions: Pedro Gil Street; N140 (Quirino Avenue)
- To: Ocampo Street in Malate

Adriatico Street is a north–south road connecting the Ermita and Malate districts in Manila, Philippines. Its northern terminus is at Padre Faura Street in Ermita, carrying southbound traffic all the way to Quirino Avenue in Malate. South of Quirino, the street becomes two-way, with a wide median running down the center from just past the Manila Zoo up to its southern terminus at Ocampo Street.

== Description ==
Adriatico is known primarily for its restaurants and bars centered around Manila's Korea Town between Pedro Gil and San Andres Streets, considered the center of bohemian nightlife in the city. Some buildings have a post-World War II appearance.

== History ==
The street's origin could be traced back as early as the 1900s, during the American occupation of the Philippines, as Calle Dakota. Also known as Dakota Avenue, it was named after the U.S. states of North Dakota and South Dakota, collectively known as The Dakotas. Its section north of Remedios Street was also one of the right-of-way alignments of tranvía that existed until 1945.

The street was renamed in 1964 after Macario Adriatico, a Filipino parliamentarian from Mindoro and author of Manila's city charter. Some stretches of the street were closed because of the 2015 Asia-Pacific Economic Cooperation Leaders' Meeting.

== Landmarks ==
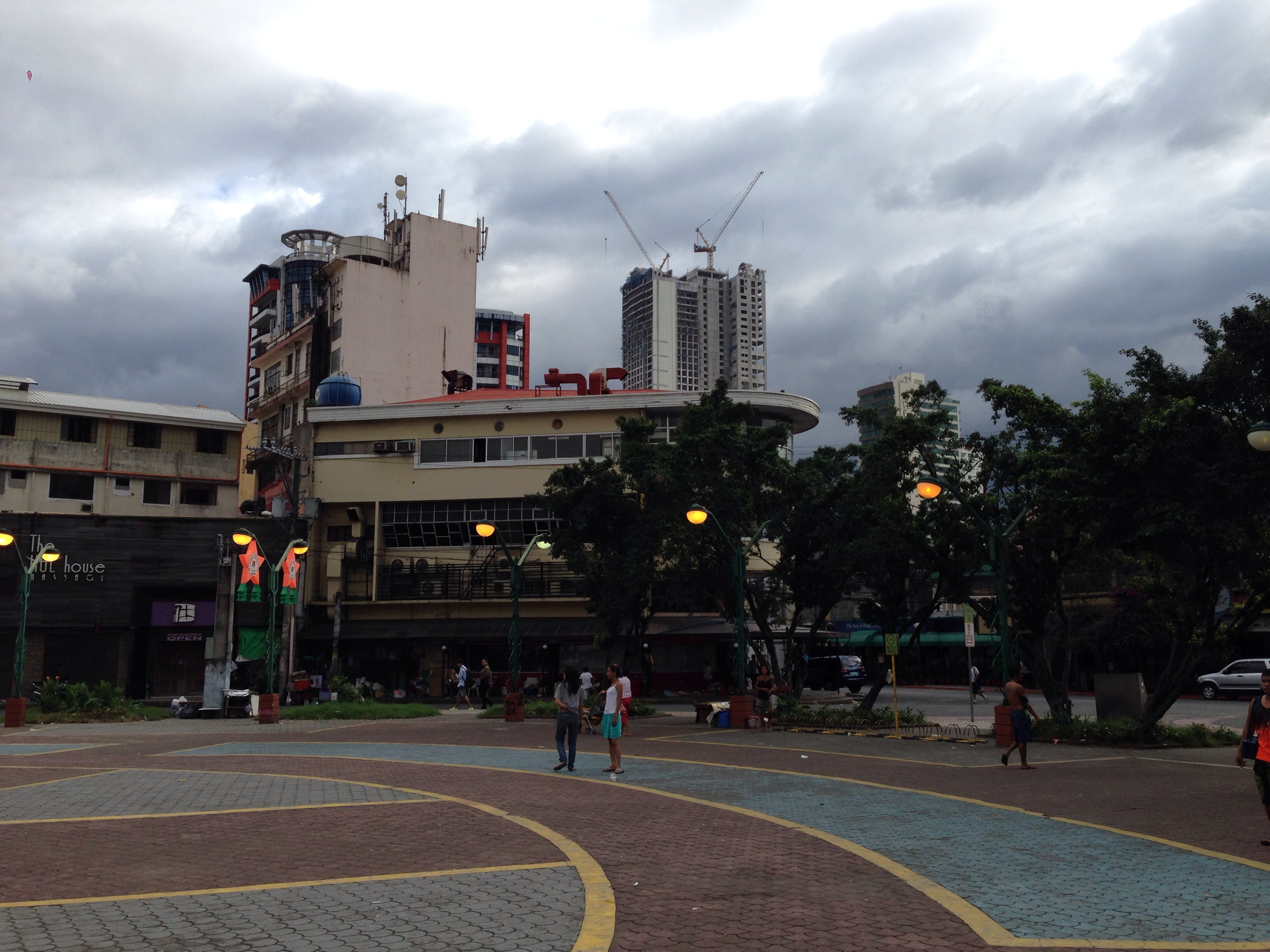
Remedios Circle

- Century Park Hotel
- Harrison Plaza (closed in 2019; demolished in 2021)
- Malate Pensionne
- Manila Zoo
- Midland Plaza Hotel
- Ninoy Aquino Stadium
- Paraiso ng Batang Maynila (Malate)
- Remedios Circle
- Rizal Memorial Stadium
- Robinsons Adriatico Residences
- Robinsons Manila
- Sheraton Manila Bay
