= Santa Remedios Church =

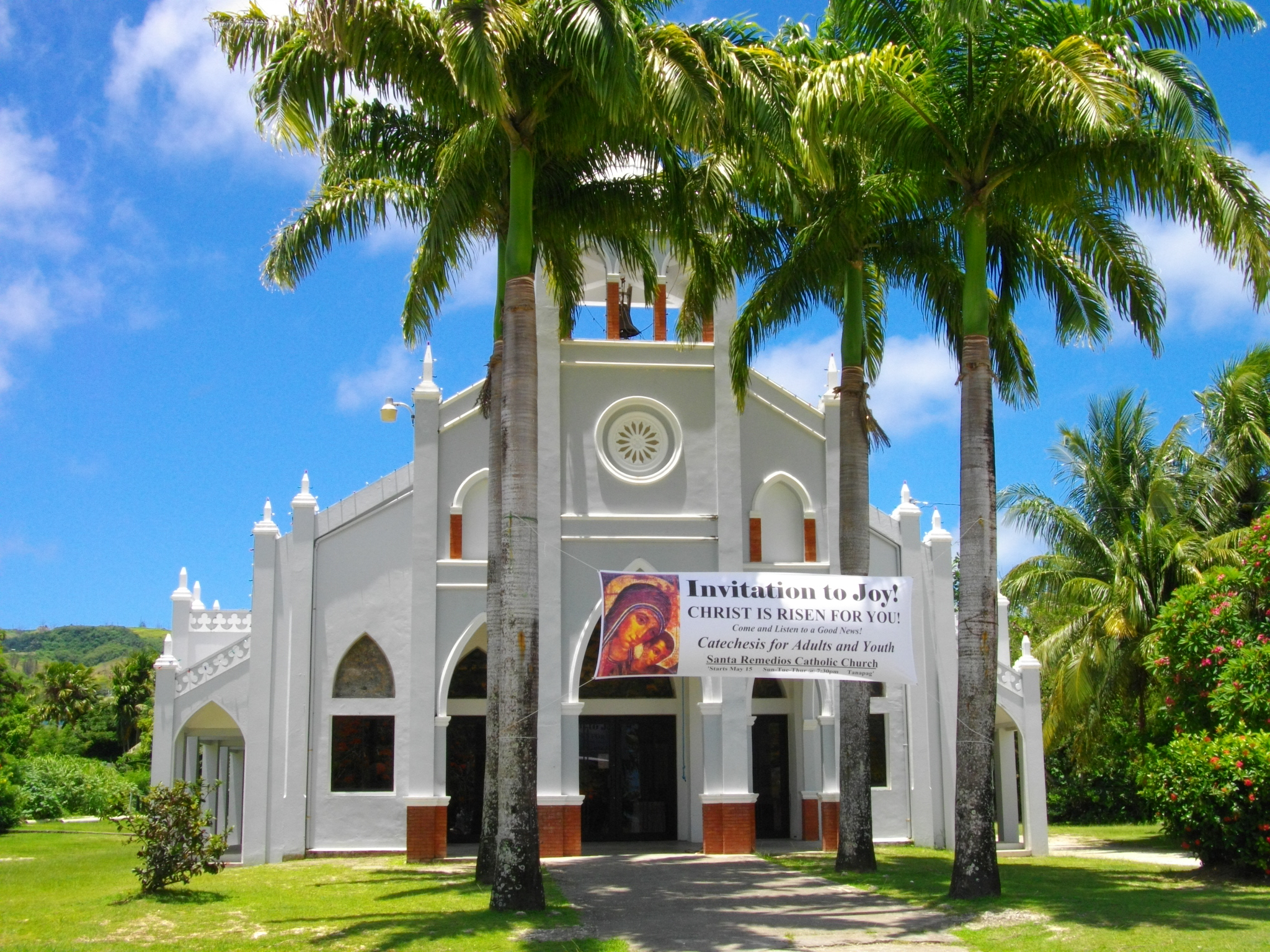

- Location in the Northern Mariana Islands Santa Remedios Church (Pacific Ocean)
- 15.242104°N 145.755175°E
- Location: Saipan
- Country: Northern Mariana Islands
- Denomination: Roman Catholic Church

The Santa Remedios Church is a religious building belonging to the Catholic Church and is located in the island of Saipan in the Northern Mariana Islands, a dependent territory of the United States in the Pacific Ocean and part of Oceania.

== History ==
The church was inaugurated and dedicated to the Virgen de los Remedios (Our Lady of Remedies or locally: Nuestra Senora Bithen de los Remedios) officially in October 1958, following the Roman or Latin rite and depends on the Diocese of Chalan Kanoa (Dioecesis Vialembensis) which was created in 1984 by Pope John Paul II by Properamus bull. Its entrance is adorned with palm trees and gardens. The building was renovated in 1995 and rededicated on the feast of "Santa Remedios".

== See also ==
- Roman Catholic Diocese of Chalan Kanoa
- Virgin of Los Remedios
