= Virgin of Los Remedios =

Title of the Virgin Mary

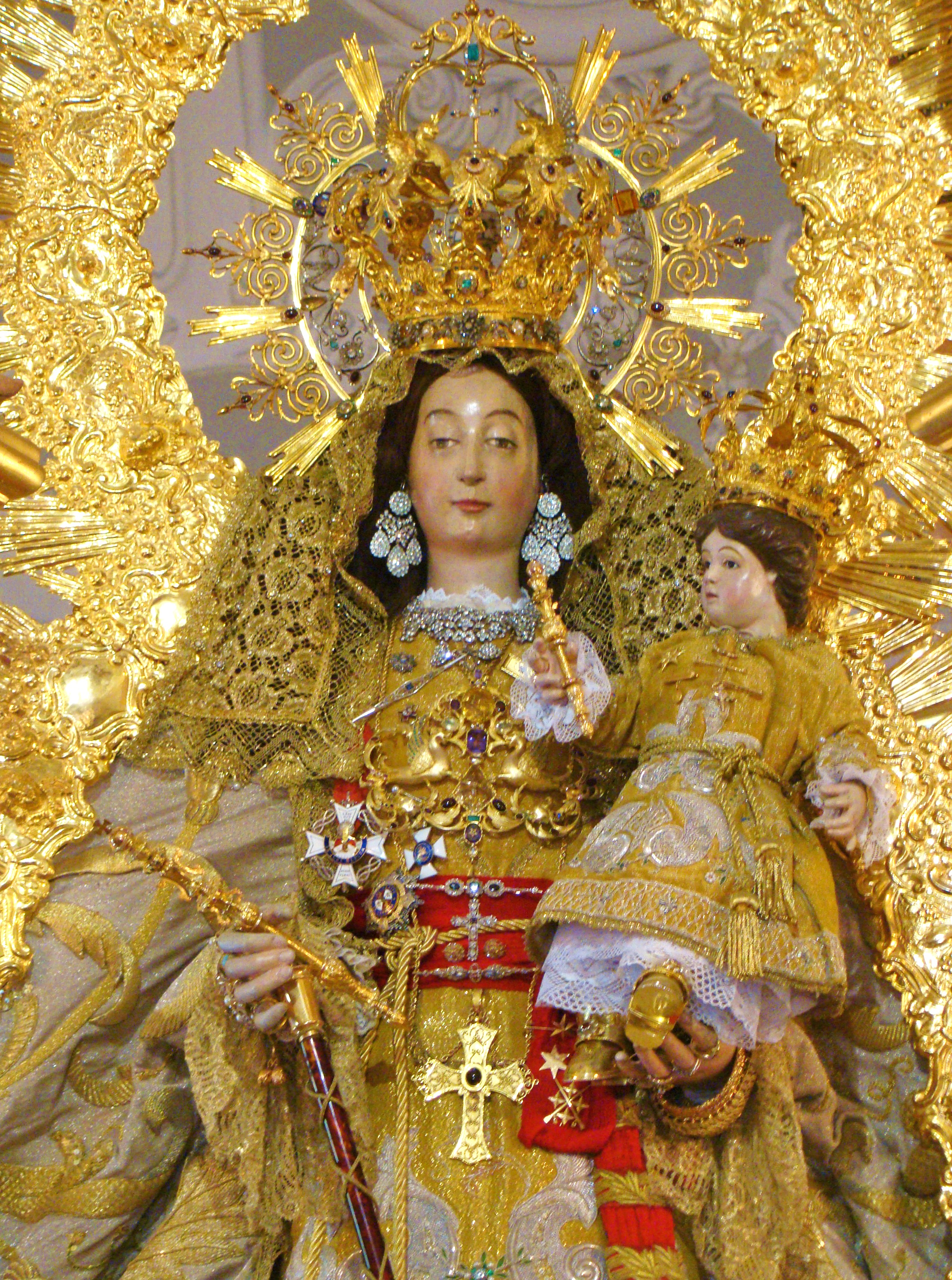
Our Lady of Los Remedios, Fregenal de la Sierra, Badajoz, Spain

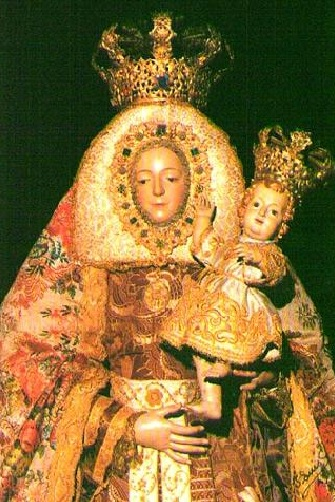
Virgin of Los Remedios, Patroness Saint of the Roman Catholic Diocese of San Cristóbal de La Laguna (Tenerife, Spain).

The Virgin of Los Remedios (Spanish: La Virgen de los Remedios) or Our Lady of Los Remedios (Portuguese: Nossa Senhora dos Remédios, Spanish: Nuestra Señora de los Remedios) is a title of the Virgin Mary developed by the Trinitarian Order, founded in the late 12th century. The devotion became tied to the Reconquista of Spain, then still at its height. In the following century it spread to other parts of Europe. When Spain began the exploration and conquest of the Americas, it was a favorite devotion of the Spanish conquistadores. It remains a popular devotion in Spain and Latin America.

== Name ==
The devotion was founded by the Trinitarian Order, whose full title is "Order of the Most Holy Trinity and of the Captives". According to Angelico Chavez, Nuestra Señora de los Remedios 'cannot be rendered properly into English. Remedios does mean “remedies” or “cures.” Some have translated it variously as "Our Lady of Remedies" or "of Help" or "of Ransom." The Spanish meaning as used here connotes all these ideas in one word.' Similar English words occur in other titles of Mary with separate histories, including "Our Lady of Ransom [of captives]" (Nuestra Señora de la Redención de los Cautivos), "Our Lady of Perpetual Help" (Nuestra Señora del Perpetuo Socorro), and "Our Lady of Good Health" (Nuestra Señora de la Salud).

== Spain ==
El Santuario de Nuestra Señora de Los Remedios is located in Olvera, where in the 18th century, where the sanctuary was built on the foundations of a small hermitage.

Nuestra Señora de Los Remedios is the patroness saint of Cártama, where she is said to have cured people affected by a plague epidemic in 1579.

The Virgin of Los Remedios is the patroness saint of the Roman Catholic Diocese of San Cristóbal de La Laguna, the island of Tenerife, and the city of Cali, Colombia.

== Mexico ==
It is believed that the best known image in the Western Hemisphere under this title of Mary was brought to Mexico by the conquistadores. It is a small statue, measuring 27 cm (about 10.5 inches) in height. This image is strongly linked with the Spanish Conquest, especially the episode known as the Noche Triste or "Night of Sorrows". It is said Cortés led his men to an indigenous religious sanctuary to escape the Aztecs, stopping here on their way to Otumba. According to legend, one of Cortés's soldiers, Gonzalo Rodríguez de Villafuerte, was carrying a small image of the Virgin Mary and hid her under a maguey plant in order to retrieve and pay homage to her later if he survived. During a later battle in this area, the Spanish reported seeing a young girl throwing dirt into the eyes of the Aztecs to help the Spanish. Another legend states that this image appeared at the Cerro de los Pajaros, where a chapel was built in 1574, which later was expanded in 1628 with a vaulted roof and cupola.

Being connected with the Conquest, this image of the Virgin is considered to be “Spanish” and a patroness to them and to the indigenous who adopt Spanish ways. She is considered one of the Virgins who correlate with the four cardinal directions (in her case, the west), along with the Virgins of Guadalupe, of la Piedad and de la Bala.

Despite her importance to the area, this image was kept at the Mexico City Cathedral until 1810, when it was moved to her sanctuary in Naucalpan, dressed as a general. It was proclaimed a patroness of Spain and the “guardian of the Spanish Army.” The purpose of this was to counter Miguel Hidalgo’s use of the Virgin of Guadalupe as a symbol of his independence movement.

This image was center of one of the first annual processions to be held in Mexico, which went from the Church of Santa Veracruz in Mexico City to her home sanctuary in Los Remedios National Park. Its feast day is celebrated on September 1, when the sanctuary is profusely decorated with white flowers, including a carpet of flower petals in the San Miguel Arcangel esplanade. This sanctuary is not located in the mountainous western part of the municipality where Los Remedios National Park stands. Her feast day is celebrated with dances knowns as “Los Apaches,” “Los Moros,” “Chichimecas” and “Pastorcitas,” with 450th anniversary of her finding celebrated in 1990.

== Brazil ==
- Catedral de Nossa Senhora dos Remédios, in Caxias, Maranhão

== See also ==
- Our Lady of Guadalupe
- Virgin of Candelaria
- Virgen de los Remedios de Pampanga
- Our Lady of Manaoag
- Our Lady of La Naval de Manila
- Santa Remedios Church
- Our Lady of Remedies (disambiguation), other places named after this title
