= Roxas Boulevard =

Major street in Metro Manila, Philippines

Coordinates: 14°34′05″N 120°59′00″E

R-1 Roxas Boulevard

- The route of Roxas Boulevard within Metro Manila. Roxas Boulevard is highlighted in red.

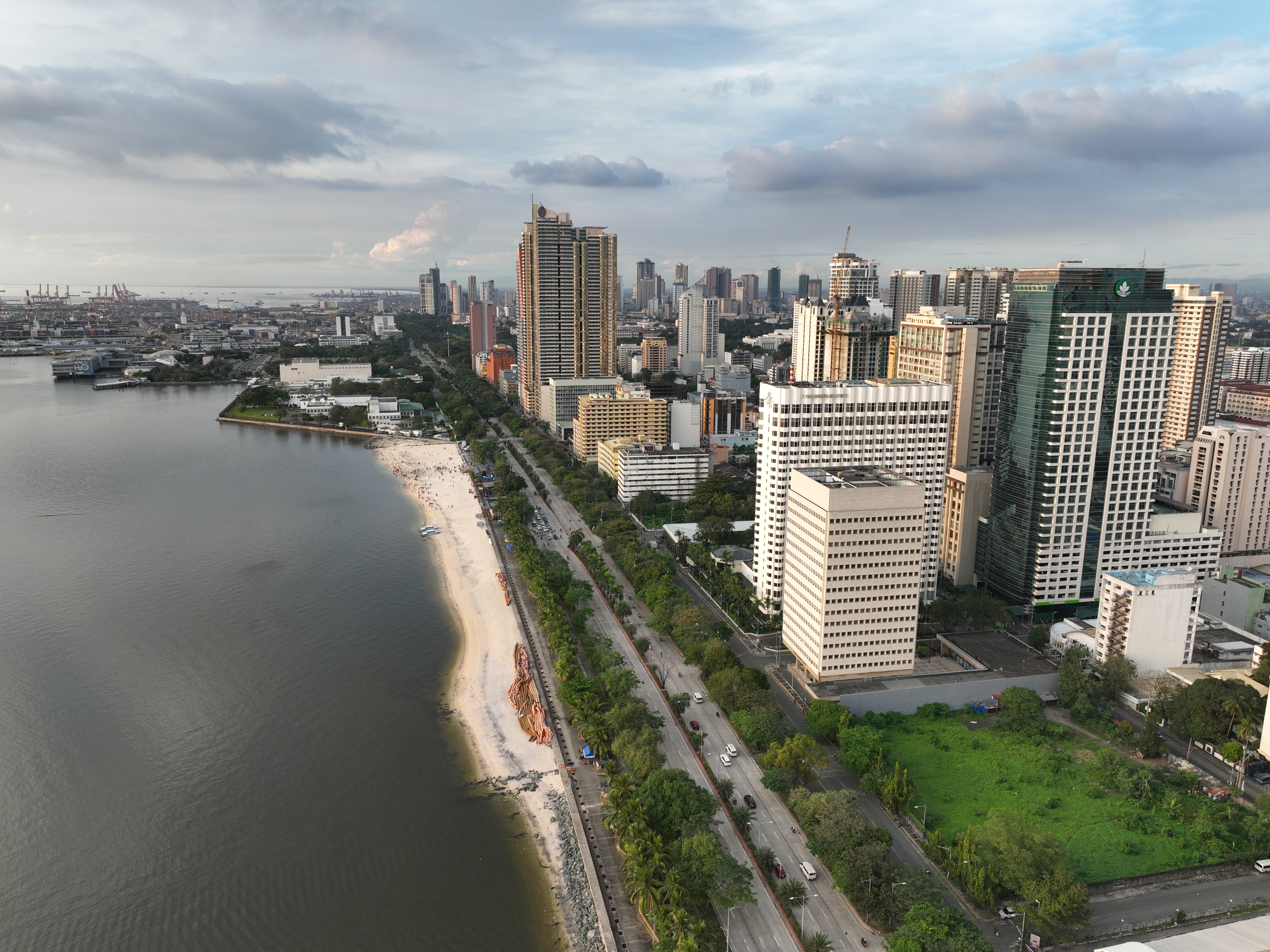
- Aerial view of Roxas Boulevard (2025)

Route information
- Maintained by the Department of Public Works and Highways
- Length: 7.6 km (4.7 mi)
- Existed: 1910s–present
- Component highways: R-1 R-1; AH26 in Manila and Pasay; N61 in Pasay and Parañaque

Major junctions
- North end: AH26 (Bonifacio Drive) / N150 (Padre Burgos Avenue) / Katigbak Parkway in Ermita, Manila
- N155 (Kalaw Avenue); N156 (United Nations Avenue); N140 (Quirino Avenue); N190 (Gil Puyat Avenue); AH26 (EDSA); N192 (Andrews Avenue)
- South end: E3 (Manila–Cavite Expressway) / N63 (MIA Road) / Seaside Drive in Parañaque

Location
- Country: Philippines
- Major cities: Manila, Pasay, and Parañaque

Highway system
- Roads in the Philippines; Highways; Expressways; List

Roxas Boulevard is a popular waterfront promenade in Metro Manila in the Philippines. The boulevard, which runs along the shores of Manila Bay, is well known for its sunsets and stretch of coconut trees. The divided roadway has become a trademark of Philippine tourism, famed for its yacht club, hotels, restaurants, commercial buildings and parks.

The boulevard was completed in the 1910s. Originally called Cavite Boulevard, it was renamed Dewey Boulevard in honor of the American admiral George Dewey, whose forces defeated the Spanish navy in the Battle of Manila Bay in 1898, Heiwa Boulevard (平和大通り) in late 1941 during the Japanese occupation, and finally Roxas Boulevard in 1963 in honor of Manuel Roxas, the fifth President of the Philippines. It was also designated as a new alignment of the Manila South Road that connects Manila to the southern provinces of Luzon.

The boulevard is also an eight-lane major arterial road in Metro Manila designated as Radial Road 1 (R-1) of Manila's arterial road network, National Route 61 (N61), the shortest primary route in the Philippines, National Route 120 (N120) of the Philippine highway network and a spur of Asian Highway 26 (AH26). The arcing road runs north–south from Luneta in Manila to Parañaque at the intersection of MIA Road and Seaside Drive of the reclaimed area of Entertainment City beneath the elevated NAIA Expressway. At its southern terminus is the Manila–Cavite Expressway (E3), formerly known as Coastal Road and now more popularly called CAVITEX.

== History ==
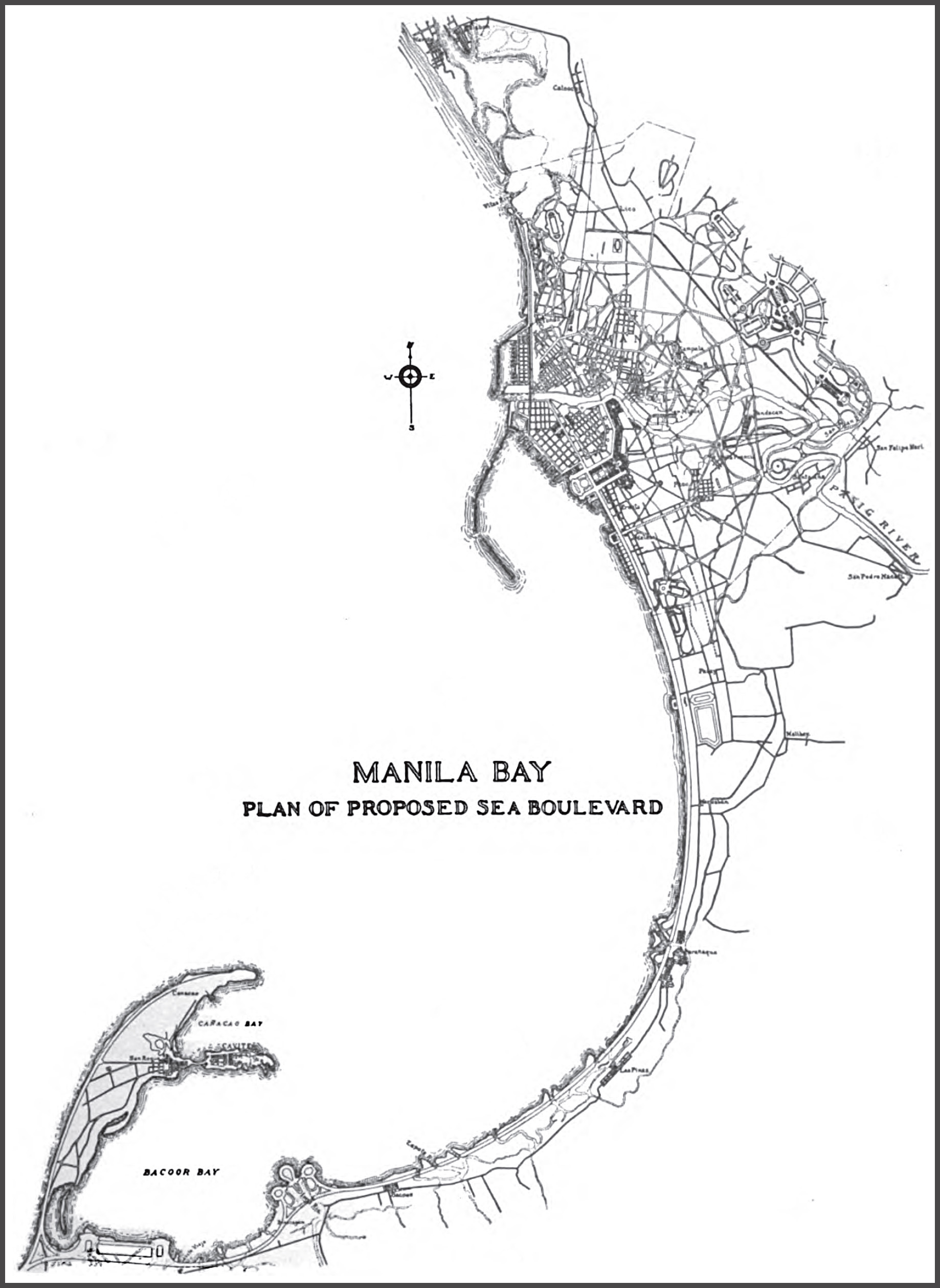
Daniel Burnham's plan of the sea boulevard from Manila to Cavite

=== City Beautiful movement ===
Cavite Boulevard was part of Architect Daniel Burnham's plan to beautify the city of Manila. At the request of Commissioner William Cameron Forbes, Burnham visited the country in 1905 at the height of the City Beautiful movement, a trend in the early 1900s in America to make cities beautiful along scientific lines, for the future urban development of Manila and the summer capital of Baguio.

=== Original concept ===
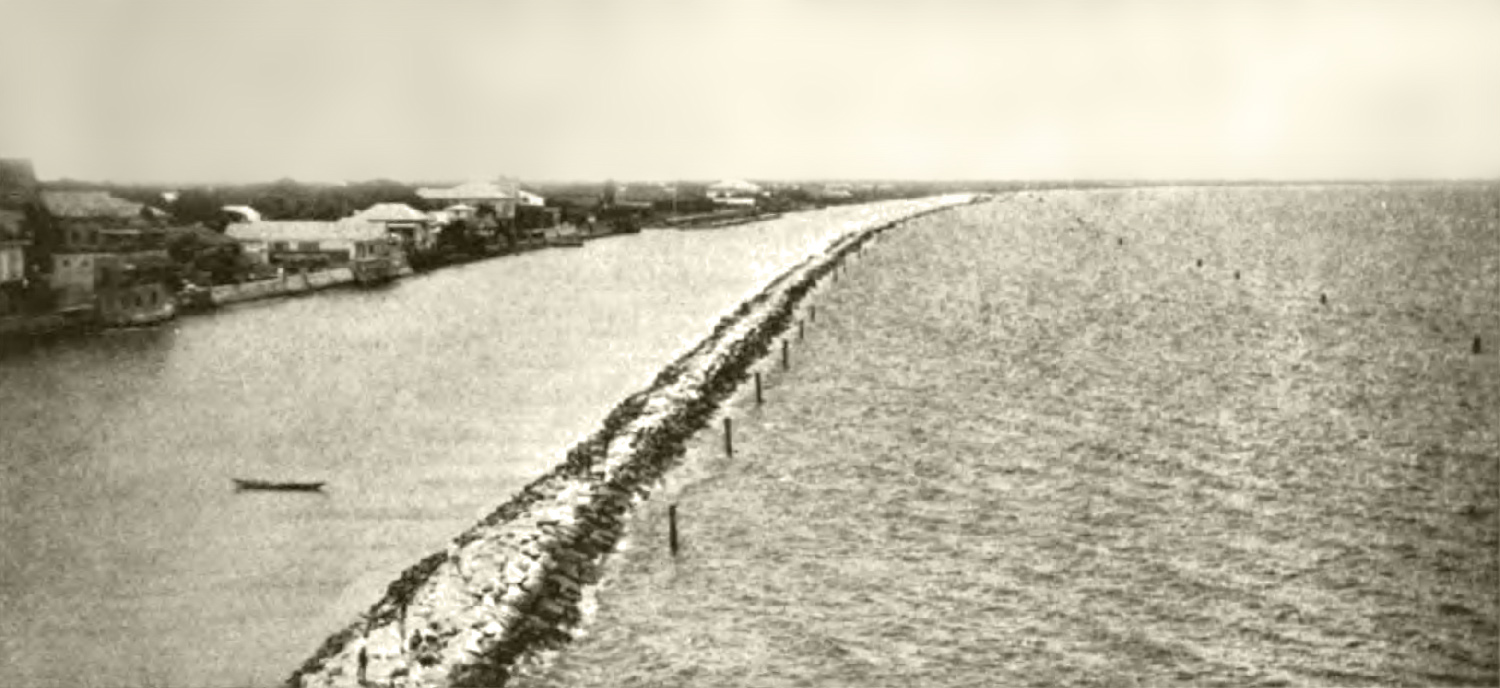
Construction of Cavite Boulevard, 1912

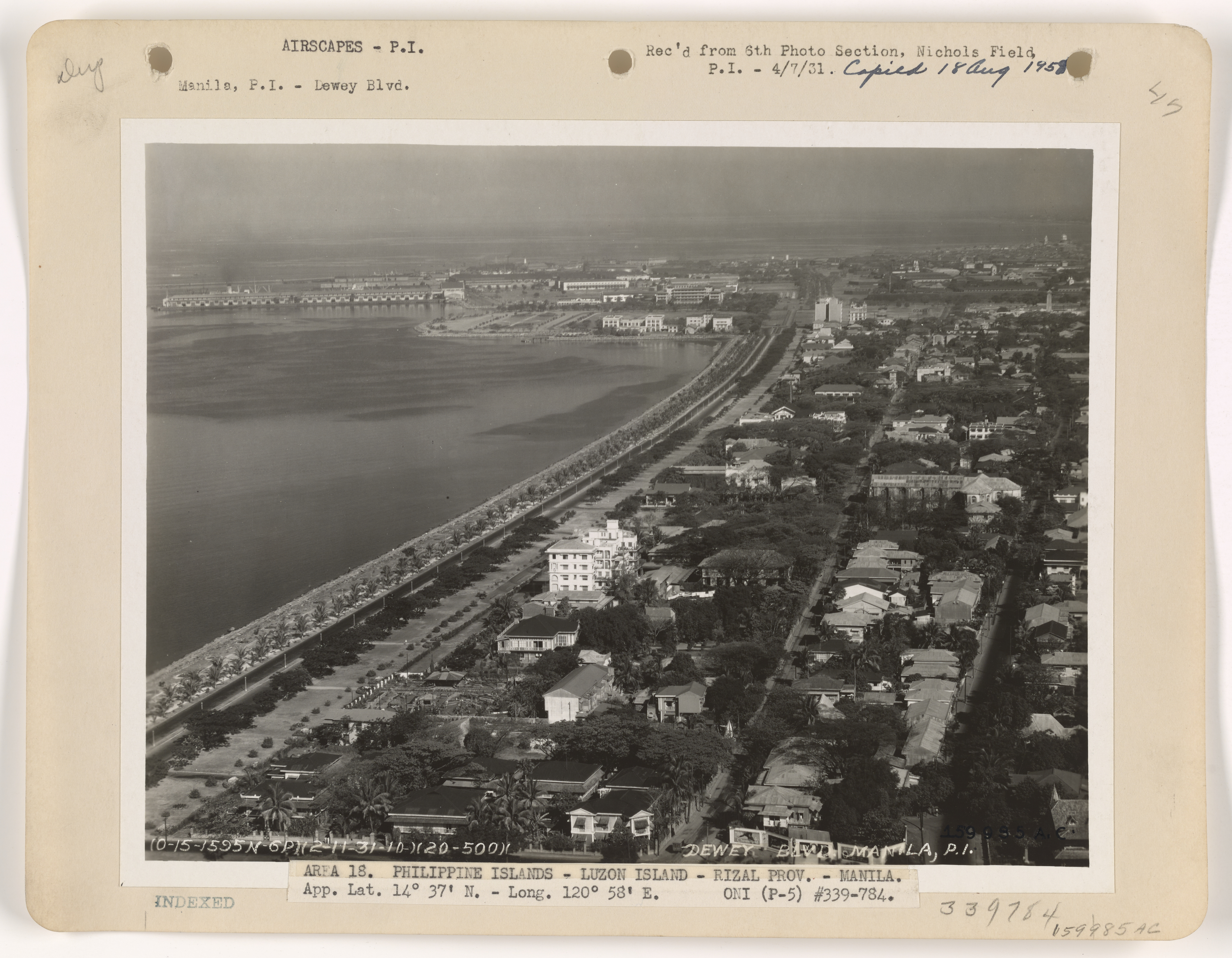
Aerial view of Dewey Boulevard, 1931

According to Burnham's original concept of the Cavite Boulevard, the bayfront from Luneta southward should be a continuous parkway, extending with time to the Cavite Navy Yard about 20 miles (32 km) away. This boulevard, about 250 ft (76 m) in width, with roadways, tramways, bridle paths, rich plantations, and broad sidewalks, should be available for all classes of people in all sorts of conveyances, and so well-shaded with coconut palms, bamboo, and mangoes as to furnish protection from the elements at all times.

"In order to make the boulevard presentable and useful as soon as possible, a quick-growing tree like the acacia might be planted, alternating with the trees of slower growth, and be replaced after the latter attain their growth. The boulevard's seaward side should be planted so as to interrupt occasionally the view of the sea and, by thus adding somewhat of mystery, enhance the value of the stretch of ocean and sky. The boulevard would be on reclaimed land to about as far south as the old Fort San Antonio Abad in Malate, beyond which it strikes the beach and follows the shoreline to Cavite. The possible extension of the ocean boulevard along the north shore would naturally depend upon the development of the town in that direction and upon the question of additional harbor works north of the Pasig River."

During World War II, the boulevard served as a runway of its namesake airfield. During the 1945 Battle of Manila, however, the Japanese forces cut down palm trees along the boulevard to convert it into an improvised runway.

=== Contemporary history ===
During the 1970s, a longstanding debate emerged over the appropriate location for the headquarters of the Association of Southeast Asian Nations (ASEAN). Philippine President Ferdinand Marcos proposed situating the headquarters along Roxas Boulevard in Manila, while Indonesian President Suharto advocated for its placement on Jalan Sisingamangaraja in Jakarta. Consensus at the first was eventually reached in favour of Indonesia as the host country for the ASEAN headquarters.

In 1992, flyovers crossing intersecting roads along the boulevard, such as the Roxas Boulevard–Gil Puyat Flyover and Roxas Boulevard–EDSA Flyover, were opened.

On May 13, 2024, Manila Mayor Honey Lacuña signed Ordinance No. 9047 to make a part of the boulevard starting at Padre Burgos Avenue/Katigbak Parkway to Quirino Avenue car-free every early Sunday morning starting May 26, 2024.

== Route description ==
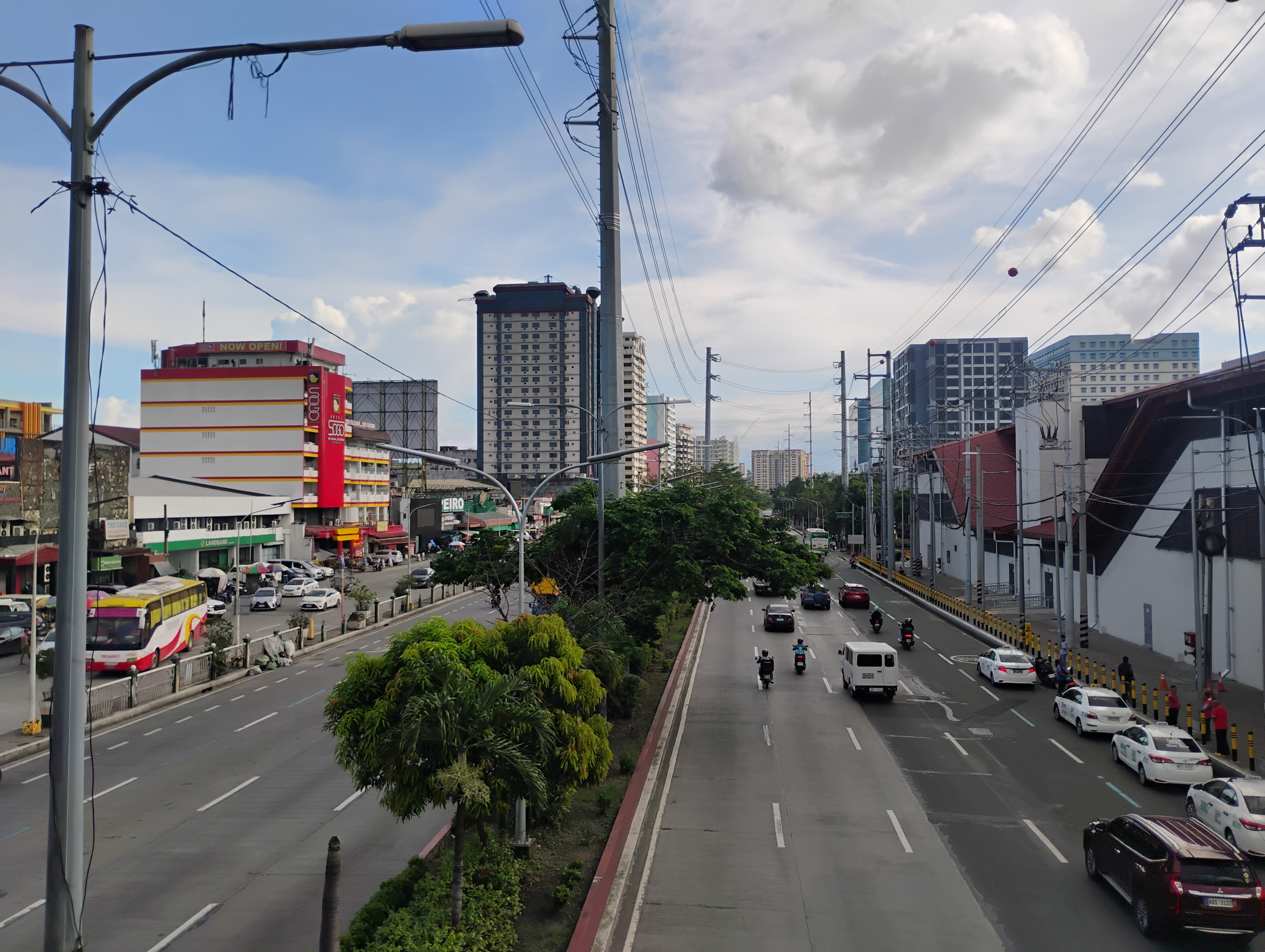
Roxas Boulevard in Baclaran, Parañaque. This section south of EDSA is classified under N61 highway.

Roxas Boulevard starts at the junction with Katigbak Parkway and Padre Burgos Avenue at Rizal Park in Manila as a continuation of Bonifacio Drive. The road passes through many tall buildings, restaurants, banks, monuments, and other establishments as it curves along Manila Bay. The United States Embassy is located near Rizal Park. A kilometer south are the complex of Bangko Sentral ng Pilipinas (BSP) and Philippine Navy in the Malate district of Manila.

The boulevard enters Pasay and becomes landlocked that continues until its terminus at Manila–Cavite Expressway (CAVITEX/E3) which is also known as Coastal Road after passing the BSP complex where the Cultural Center of the Philippines (CCP Complex) and Star City are seen. It then intersects with Gil Puyat Avenue and Jose W. Diokno Boulevard, where it ascends through the Gil Puyat Flyover. It then parallels Macapagal Boulevard. At a halfway of the boulevard's landlocked section, it ascends again to intersect Epifanio de los Santos Avenue (EDSA) through the flyover of the same name; there, the route number transitions from N120/AH26, a secondary road, to N61, a primary road. After passing EDSA, it enters Parañaque, continues into a straight route until it ends on an intersection with MIA Road and Seaside Drive, where the road continues south as CAVITEX.

=== Landmarks ===
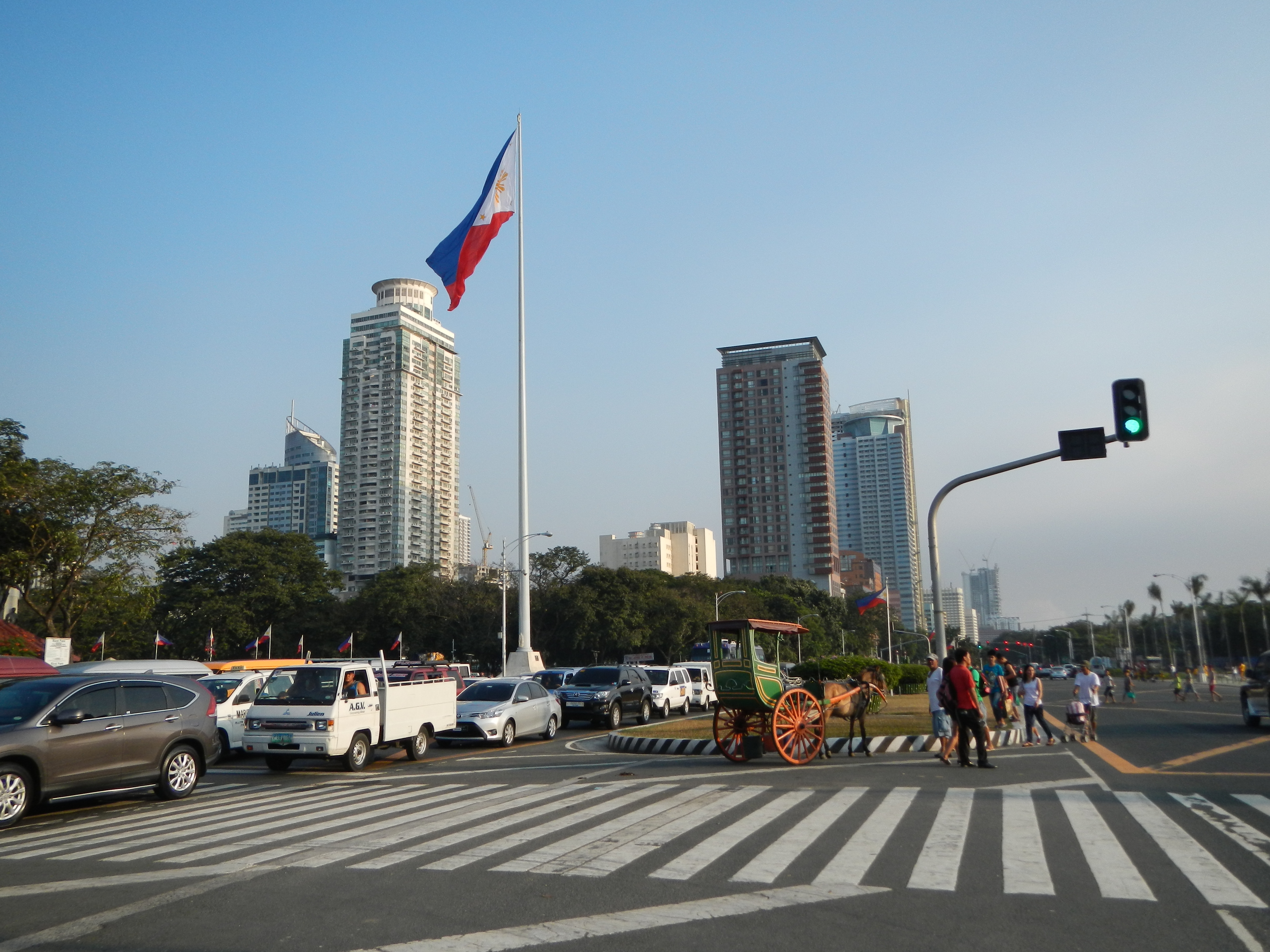
The historic Rizal Park marks the northern end of the boulevard.

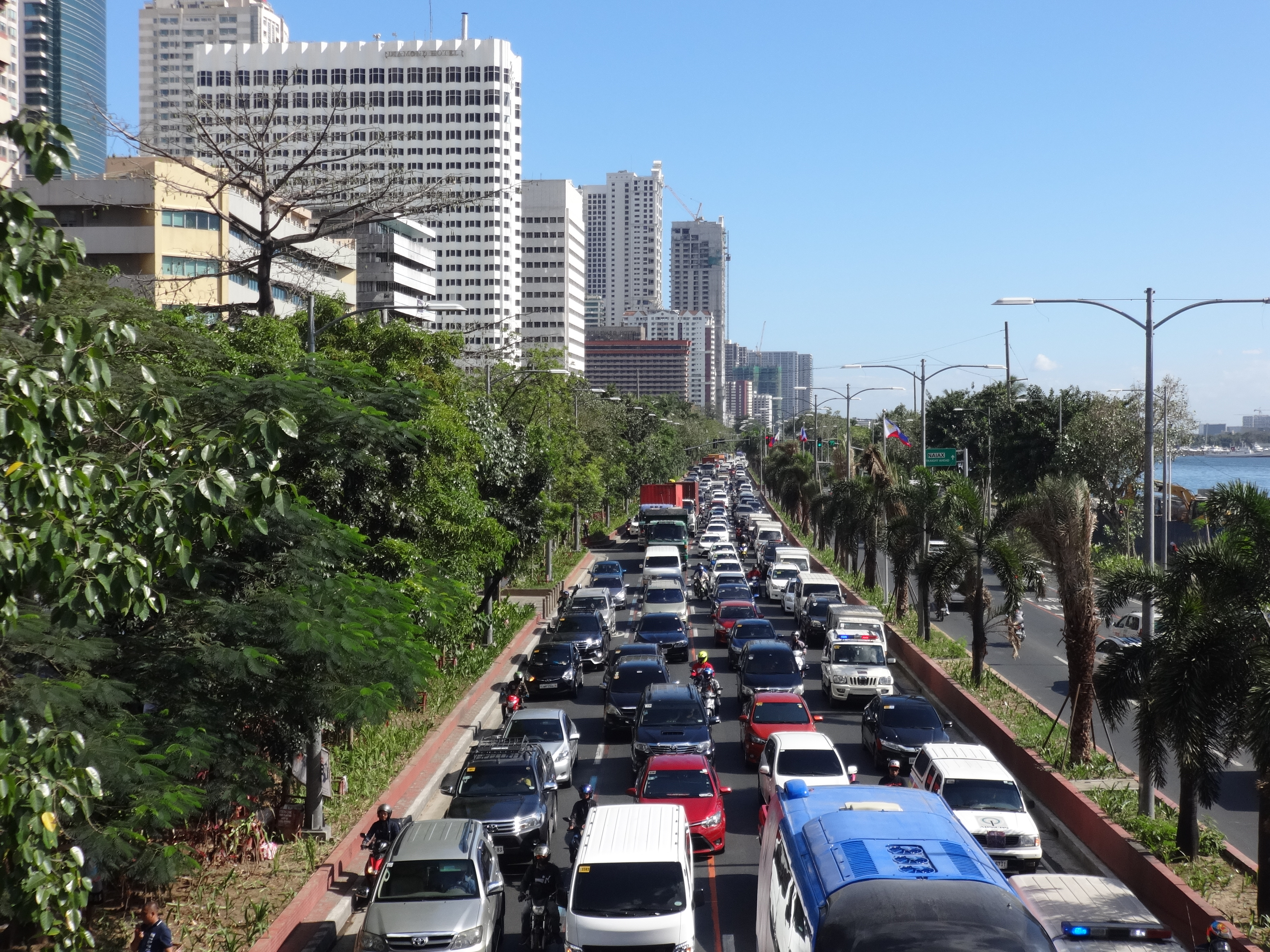
The boulevard facing south, to the southeast of the US Embassy

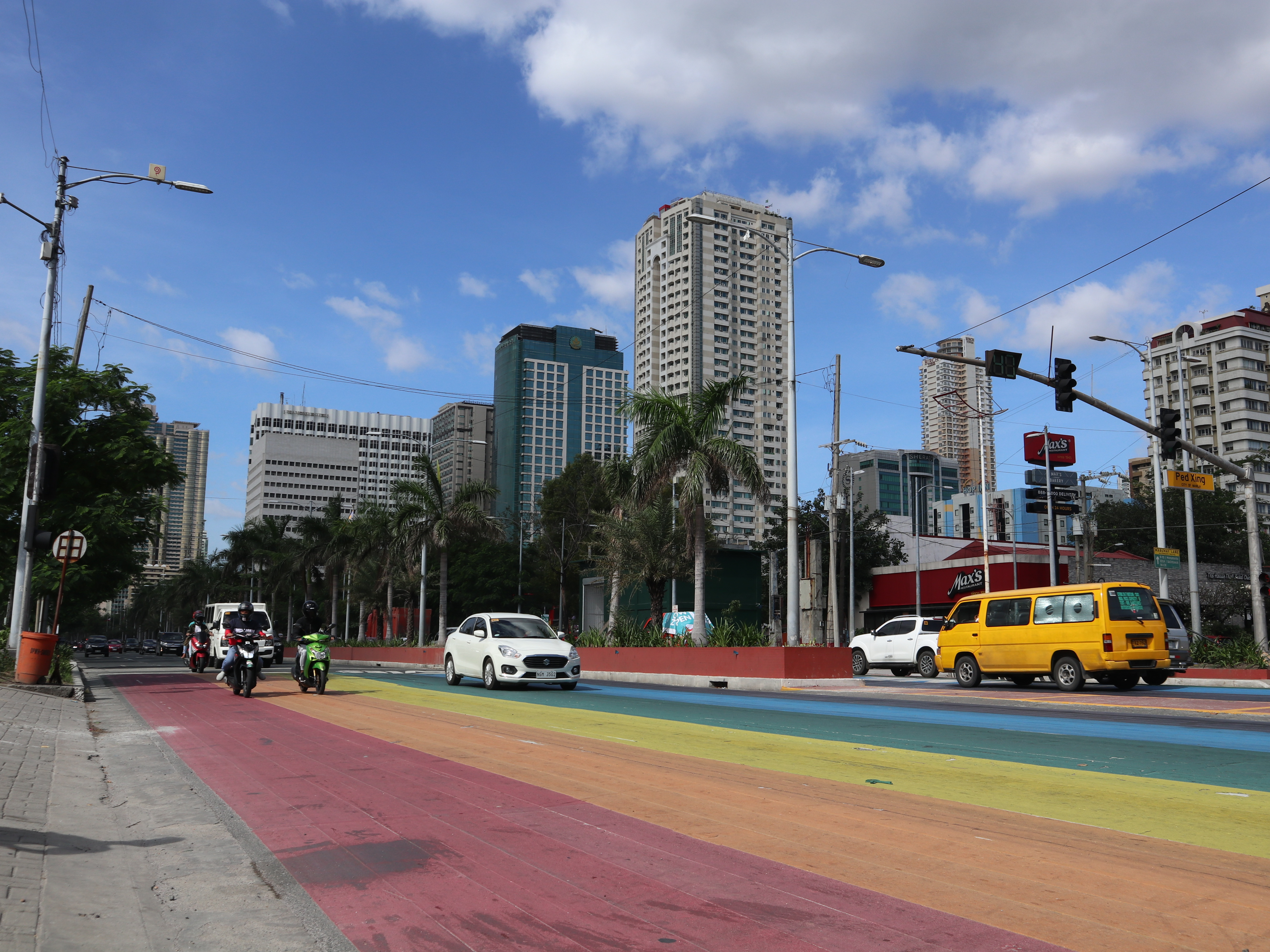
The Malate section of Roxas Boulevard is famous for Baywalk and Plaza Rajah Sulayman.

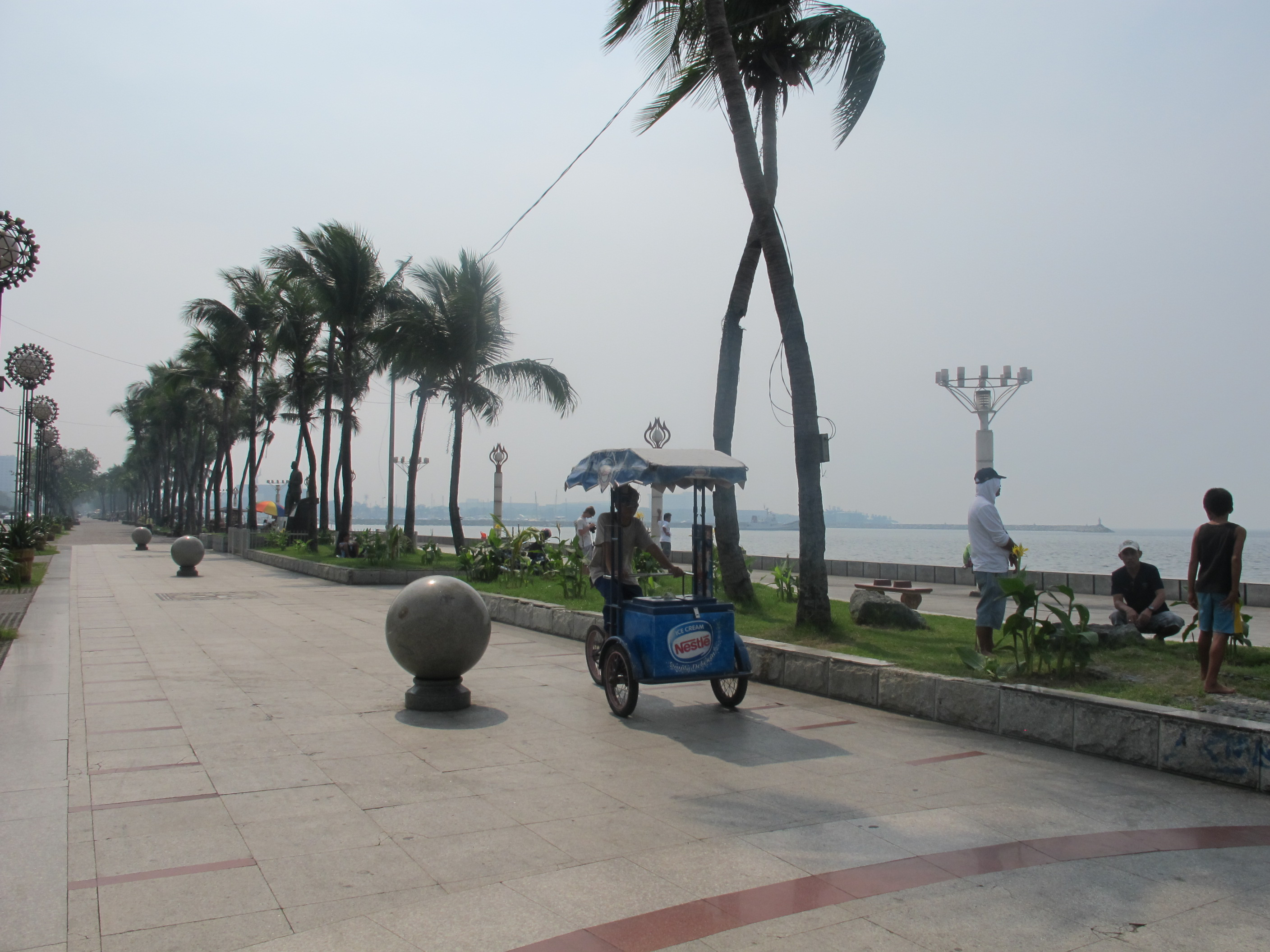
Former state of Manila's Baywalk along Roxas Boulevard - most of the stretch is now fenced off and only for walking, except the Manila Bay Dolomite Beach

This list is ordered from north to south:

==== Manila ====
- Rizal Park
  - Kilometer Zero
  - Independence Flagpole
- Museo Pambata
- Embassy of the United States in Manila
- Pearl of the Orient Tower
- Grand Riviera Suites
- Plaza Nuestra Señora de Guia (Plaza Ferguson)
- 1322 Golden Empire Tower
- Manila Dolomite Beach
- Baywalk
- Ramon Magsaysay Center
- Plaza Rajah Sulayman
  - Malate Church (Our Lady of Remedies Parish)
  - The Aristocrat Restaurant (a historic Filipino culinary establishment)
- Admiral Hotel
- Ospital ng Maynila Medical Center
- Bangko Sentral ng Pilipinas Complex
  - BSP Headquarters Building and Museum
  - Department of Finance
  - Fort San Antonio Abad
- Manila Yacht Club
- Naval Station Jose Andrada (Philippine Navy headquarters)

==== Pasay ====
- Cultural Center of the Philippines Complex
  - Cultural Center of the Philippines
  - Star City
- Department of Foreign Affairs Home Office (under renovation)
- Philippine Trade Training Center
- Cuneta Astrodome
- United States Embassy - Seafront Annex
  - US Veterans Affairs Office - Manila Regional Office
- Embassy of Japan in Manila
- Midas Hotel and Casino
- San Juan de Dios Educational Foundation
- Heritage Hotel Manila and Kanlaon Tower - hotel for the former, and latter as one of the former headquarters locations of ABS-CBN Corporation and Radio Philippines Network (RPN) before their transfers to Quezon City (with ABS-CBN Broadcasting Center and ELJ Communications Center for ABS-CBN, and RPN Compound for RPN) located both at the intersection of Roxas Boulevard and EDSA

==== Parañaque ====
- Baclaran Church
- Redemptorist-Aseana station
- City of Dreams Manila
- MIA Road station
- Palacio de Memoria

== Intersections ==
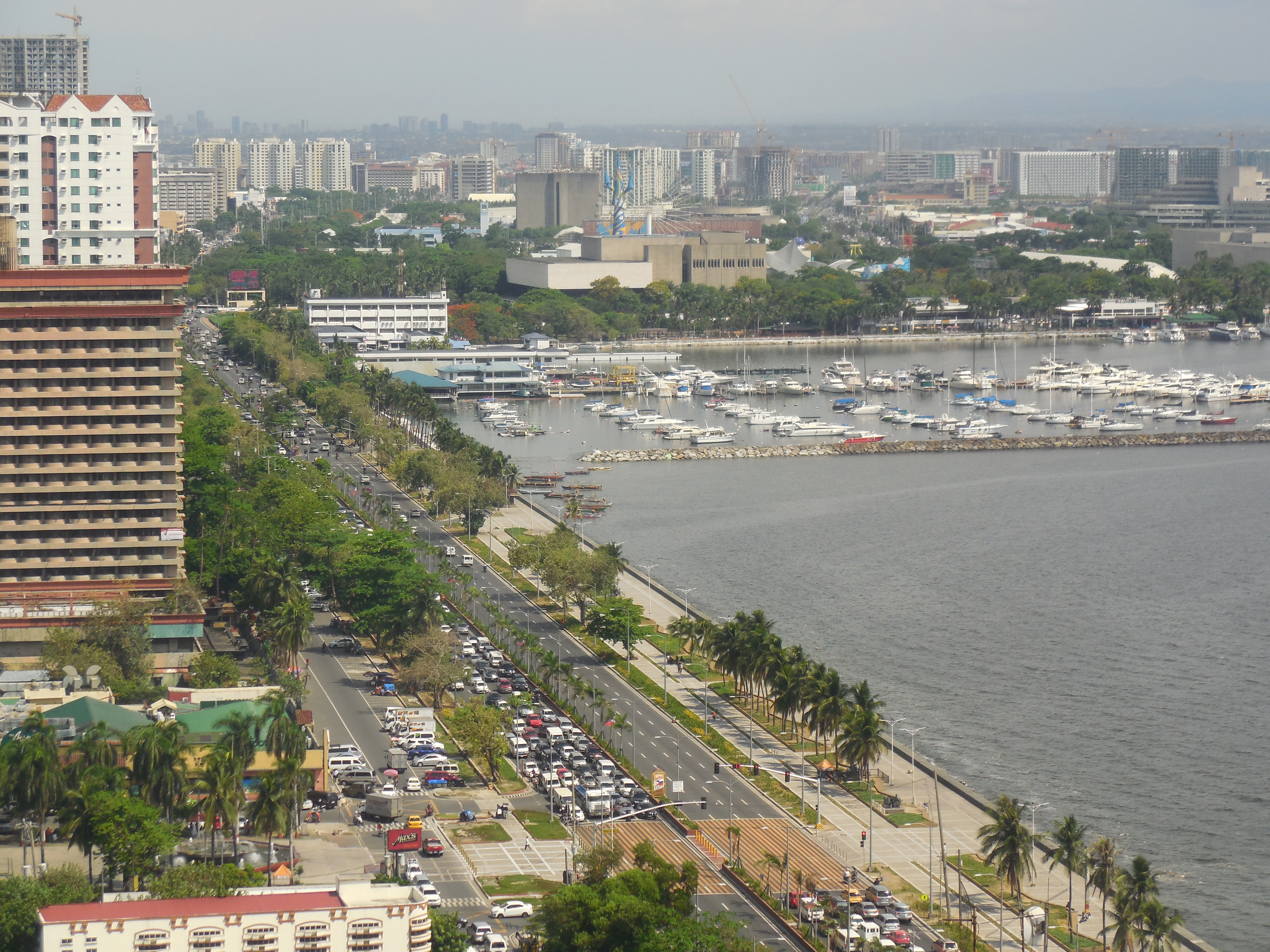
Roxas Boulevard facing south, showing the Manila Yacht Club and the Cultural Center of the Philippines Complex. The Manila Grand Boulevard Hotel has since been demolished.

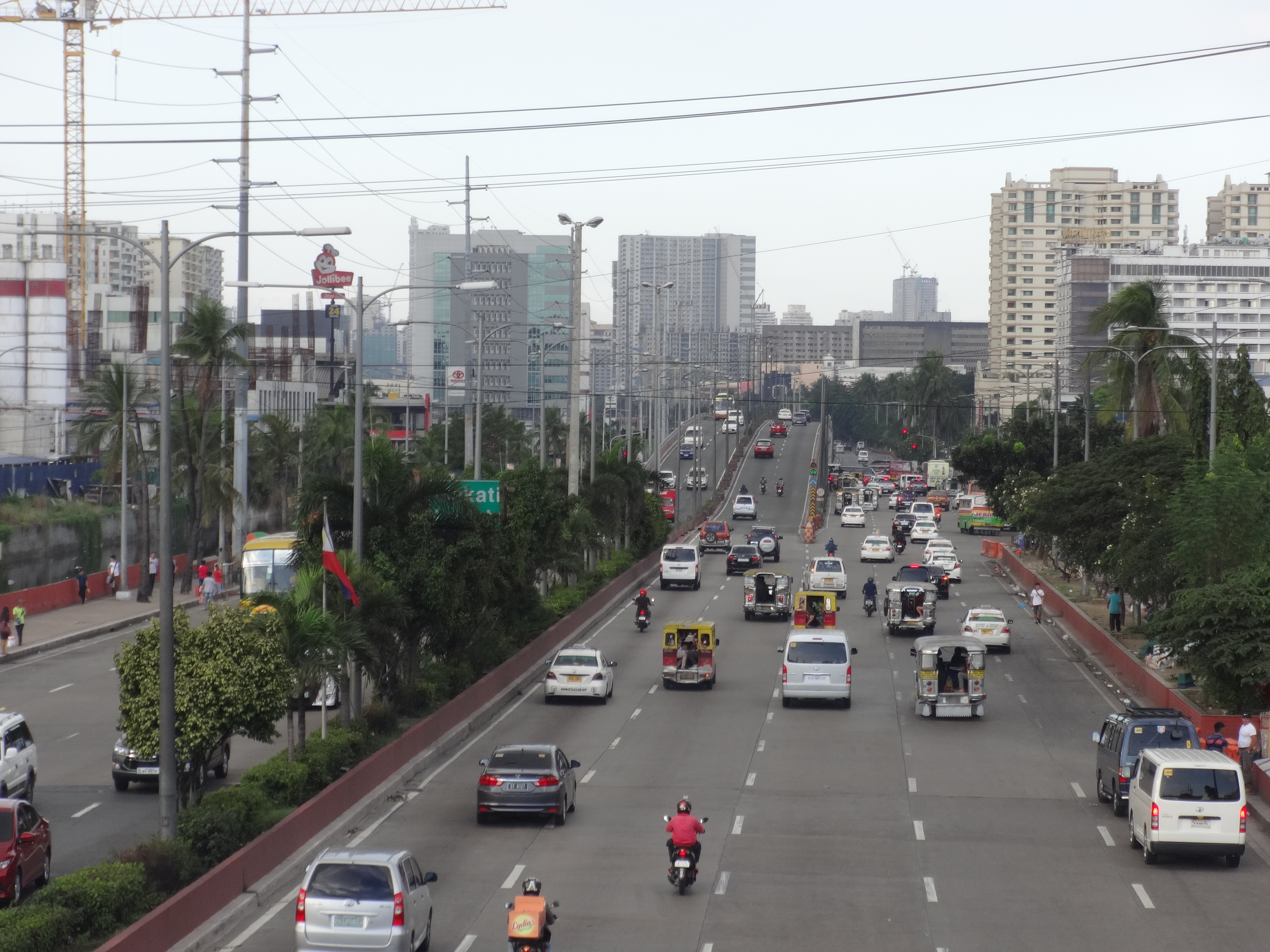
Facing north towards EDSA–Roxas Boulevard intersection in Pasay, where the boulevard transitions its route number between N61 and AH26/N120

Manila–Cavite Expressway (CAVITEX) marks the southern end of the boulevard.

Intersections are numbered by kilometer post, with Rizal Park in Manila designated as kilometer 0. The kilometer count is discontinuous.

Province	City/Municipality	km	mi	Destinations	Notes
Parañaque		7.444	4.625	N194 (NAIA Road) / Seaside Drive – Airport	Southern terminus; continues south as E3 (CAVITEx)
Parañaque		6.546	4.067	Asean Avenue (Aseana Avenue)	Southbound access only; northbound access via U-turn slot under EDSA Flyover
Parañaque		6.348	3.944	N192 (Airport Road)	No left turn allowed from southbound
Parañaque		6.099	3.790	Bradco Avenue	Southbound access only; northbound access via U-turn slot under EDSA Flyover
Parañaque		5.811	3.611	Redemptorist Road	Northbound access only
Pasay				South end of EDSA Flyover	
Pasay		5.256	3.266	AH26 (EDSA)	End of AH26 overlap; route number change from N61 to N120
Pasay				North end of EDSA Flyover	
Pasay		4.191	2.604	Arnaiz Avenue	Northbound access only; southbound access via U-turn slot under Buendia/Gil Puyat Flyover
Pasay				South end of Gil Puyat Flyover	
Pasay		4.469	2.777	N190 (Gil Puyat Avenue)	
Pasay				North end of Gil Puyat Flyover	
Manila		2.581	1.604	Pablo Ocampo Street / Pedro Bukaneg Street	No left turn allowed from northbound and southbound
Manila		2.121	1.318	N140 (Quirino Avenue)	
Manila		2.349	1.460	San Andres Street	Northbound access only
Manila				Remedios Street	Northbound access only
Manila		1.062	0.660	Pedro Gil Street	
Manila				Padre Faura Street	Northbound access only
Manila				N156 (United Nations Avenue)	
Manila				N155 (Kalaw Avenue) / South Drive	
Manila		0.000	0.000	Kilometer zero (Kilometer count reverses)	
Manila		0.205	0.127	N150 (Padre Burgos Avenue) / Katigbak Parkway	Northern terminus; continues north as AH26 (Bonifacio Drive)
1.000 mi = 1.609 km; 1.000 km = 0.621 mi: Concurrency terminus; Incomplete access

== See also ==
- Baywalk
- Major roads in Metro Manila
