= Admiral Hotel =

The Admiral Hotel may refer to:

- Admiral Hotel (Copenhagen), Denmark
- Admiral Hotel (Manila), Philippines
- Admiral Hotel (Mobile, Alabama), United States
