= Pearl of the Orient Tower =

Residential building in Manila, Philippines

- Interactive map of the Pearl of the Orient Tower area

General information
- Status: Completed
- Type: Residential
- Location: 1240 Roxas Boulevard cor. Arquiza Street, Ermita, Manila, Philippines
- Coordinates: 14°34′36.84″N 120°58′46.41″E
- Construction started: 1999
- Completed: 2004
- Opening: 2004
- Owner: Philippine Estates Corporation

Height
- Roof: 168 m (551.18 ft)

Technical details
- Floor count: 42 above ground, 4 below ground
- Floor area: 125,500 m^{2} (1,350,870.76 sq ft)
- Lifts/elevators: 6

Design and construction
- Architects: Nadel Architects; G & W Architects
- Developer: Pearl of the Orient Realty & Development Corporation
- Structural engineer: Ove Arup & Partners; F.C. Cebedo & Partners

The Pearl of the Orient Tower, previously known as Embassy Pointe Tower, is a residential skyscraper located in Manila, Philippines, owned by the Philippine Estates Corporation. Standing at 168 meters (551 feet), it is the fifty-fifth tallest building in the city of Manila. The building has 42 floors above ground, including 6 floors for parking spaces, 5 floors for offices and commercial purposes, 30 floors for luxury residential units, and 2 floors for penthouse units. There are also four basement levels for parking.

== Project team ==
The Pearl of the Orient Tower was designed by American architectural firm Nadel Architects, Inc., in cooperation with local architectural firm G & W Architects. Structural design was provided by Ove Arup & Partners and reviewed by Arup in cooperation with local engineering firm F.C. Cebedo & Partners.

Other members of the design team are M.A. Alix & Partners (Fire Protection Works) and NBF Water & Wastewater Services (now N.B. Franco Consulting Engineers—Sanitary and Plumbing Works).

Project and construction management were handled by Constech Management Group.

== Location ==
The building is located on Roxas Boulevard near Manila Bay and opposite the Embassy of the United States. It is close to the historical center of Manila – the walled city of Intramuros – and other sites including Luneta Park, Quirino Grandstand and Manila Ocean Park. A few kilometers away are the Cultural Center of the Philippines, Star City theme park, and the Manila Yacht Club.

== Features ==
Among the building's features are 3 high-speed elevators for residential floors, 2 high-speed elevators for office and commercial floors, and 1 high-speed service elevator for the entire building. The building also has a video phone communication system for residents, a centralized air conditioning system in commercial and office areas, built-in CATV cable system; telephone lines, an emergency power generator, and individual mail boxes. The building also has a helicopter landing pad on the roof deck.

The building's amenities include the City Club on the 13th floor, which includes a swimming pool and a kiddie pool, game rooms, function rooms, a gym, a health spa, a business center, and a fine-dining restaurant. The building also has an elegant and spacious lobby lounge.
