= Baywalk =

Promenade in Manila, Philippines

Coordinates: 14°34′06″N 120°58′59″E

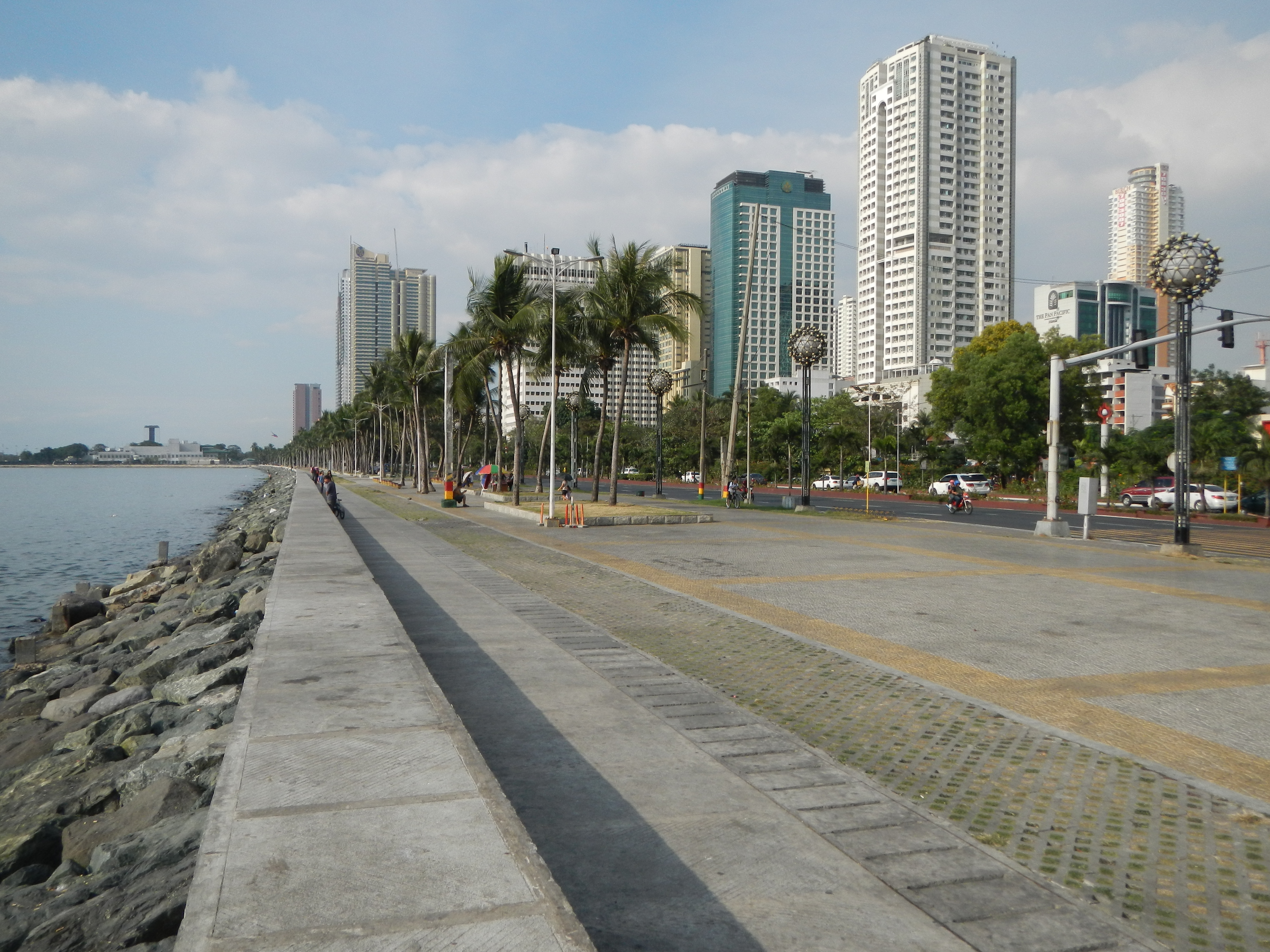
The Baywalk in Manila (2014)

The Baywalk is a popular seaside promenade and beachfront overlooking Manila Bay along Roxas Boulevard in Manila, the Philippines. The Baywalk is a two-kilometer stretch from the US Embassy near Rizal Park up to the Cultural Center of the Philippines just past the Manila Yacht Club. Several statues of national figures and other notable people can be found in the Baywalk.

== History ==
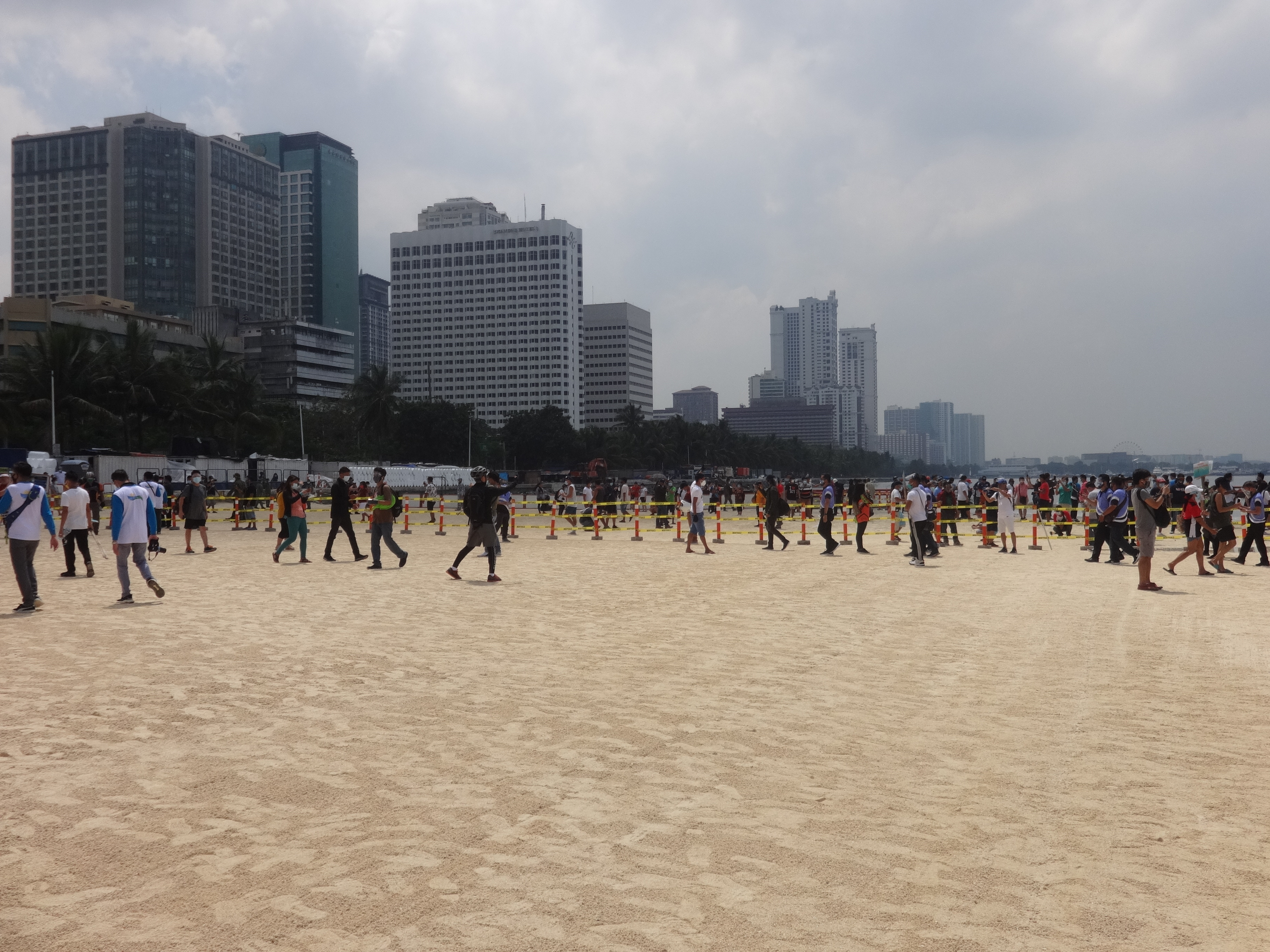
Manila Bay Beach

The Baywalk was greatly improved during the administration of Manila City Mayor Lito Atienza as part of his flagship program "Buhayin ang Maynila" (English: Revitalize Manila).

When Mayor Alfredo Lim took office in 2007, he removed the establishments along Baywalk with the reason that they block the sunset. Since then, vagrants have occupied the area and the once vibrant seaside promenade was gone. Afterwards, the national government undertook a rehabilitation of the Baywalk after it was destroyed by storm surges.

In 2020, a beach, called Manila Baywalk Dolomite Beach, was constructed along the shores of the Baywalk. The program for creating the artificial beach was launched in January 2019 under the management of Secretary of Environment and Natural Resources Roy Cimatu.

== See also ==
- Manila Bay Beach
- Manila Bay
- Manila
- Bay City, Metro Manila
