= Grand Riviera Suites =

- Location within Philippines

General information
- Status: Completed
- Type: Residential
- Location: Roxas Boulevard, Manila, Philippines
- Coordinates: 14.5767°N 120.9775°E
- Construction started: 2011
- Completed: 2014

Height
- Roof: 190 meters (620 ft)

Technical details
- Floor count: 57
- Lifts/elevators: 4

Design and construction
- Architecture firm: Asya Design Partner
- Developer: Moldex Realty

Other information
- Number of units: 1,014

The Grand Riviera Suites is a high rise residential skyscraper located along Roxas Boulevard in Manila, Philippines. At 230 meters (750 ft) high, the building is the tallest building in Manila city proper.

The building constructed by developer, Moldex Realty was designed by architectural firm, Asya Design Partner. Proposed in 2010, construction began the following year and was completed in 2014. The building was topped off in June 2013.
