= Fort San Antonio Abad =

- Kutang San Antonio Abad (Filipino); Fuerte de San Antonio Abad (Spanish)
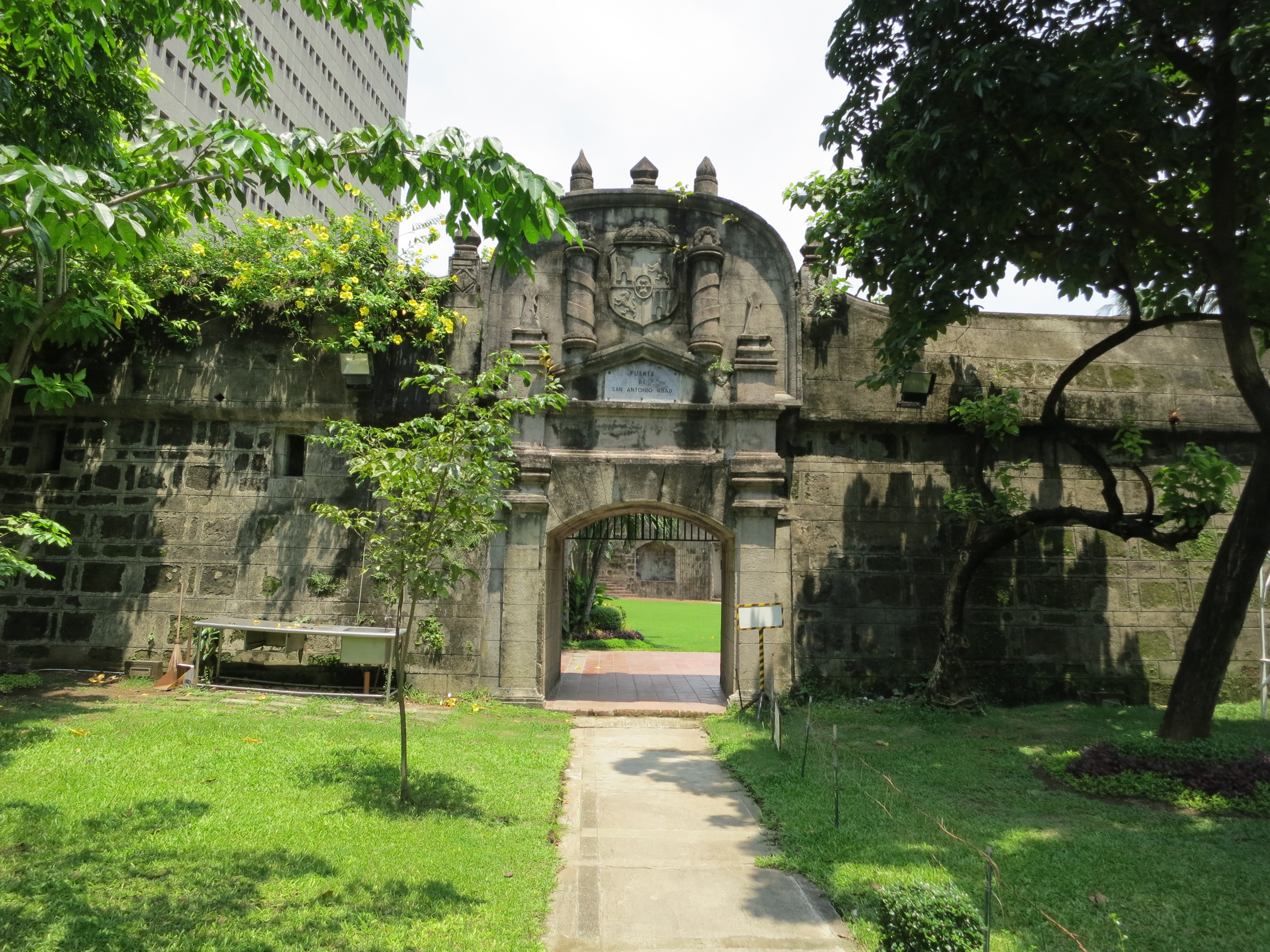

- Location within Metro Manila
- Former names: La Polvorista; Fuerte de Polverina
- Alternative names: Fort Malate; Fort San Antonio

General information
- Status: Restored
- Type: Fortification
- Architectural style: Triangular bastioned fort
- Location: Bangko Sentral ng Pilipinas (BSP) Complex, Roxas Boulevard, Manila, Philippines
- Coordinates: 14°33′45.5″N 120°59′12.6″E
- Named for: Saint Anthony the Abbot
- Completed: 1584
- Renovated: 1970s
- Owner: Government of the Philippines

Technical details
- Structural system: Masonry

Design and construction
- Designations: Historical Structure marker from the National Historical Commission of the Philippines

Fort San Antonio Abad (Spanish: Fuerte de San Antonio Abad), also known as Fort Malate or Fort San Antonio, is a fortification located in the Malate district of Manila, Philippines, completed in 1584 during the Spanish colonial period.

== History ==
Named in honor of its patron saint, Saint Anthony the Abbot, the structure was originally built in 1584 in what was then a separate hamlet of Malate to serve as a rear protection for Manila, as well as to guard the Manila–Cavite route.

The Spanish used the fort as a polvorista ("little fortress") or gunpowder magazine. The fort, known as Fuerte de Polverina, was captured by the British when they invaded Manila in 1762 during the Seven Years' War. They transformed the fort into a garrison from where the British forces launched their land offensive against the Spaniards defending Intramuros. The fort was returned to Spanish control upon the end of the British occupation of Manila in 1764 and again became a gunpowder storage facility.

The fort fell into American hands in 1898 during the Battle of Manila. During the Philippine–American War, U.S. military authorities used the prison to carry out multiple executions by hanging. The first American to be executed by U.S. authorities was Harry Cline, an American civilian under the employment of the United States Army. On April 8, 1901, Cline rode out on a bicycle some 3 miles (4.8 km) from Parañaque. He saw four small Filipino boys gathering grass. Cline, "with no other apparent motive than natural depravity", proceeded to shoot the boys with a revolver, killing a boy named Agaton Rivera and wounding the other three. Cline was tried by an American military court for murder and three counts of assault with intent to kill. He was found guilty, sentenced to death, and executed by hanging on September 20, 1901.

The fort was seized by occupying Imperial Japanese troops during World War II, when it was used as a bunker.

== Modern history ==
The fort suffered considerable damage after the war, but was not restored until the 1970s. The restored fort is now enclosed within the confines of the Bangko Sentral ng Pilipinas (BSP) Complex between the former location of the Metropolitan Museum of Manila and other buildings. Due to being within the central bank complex, security within the fort is strict.

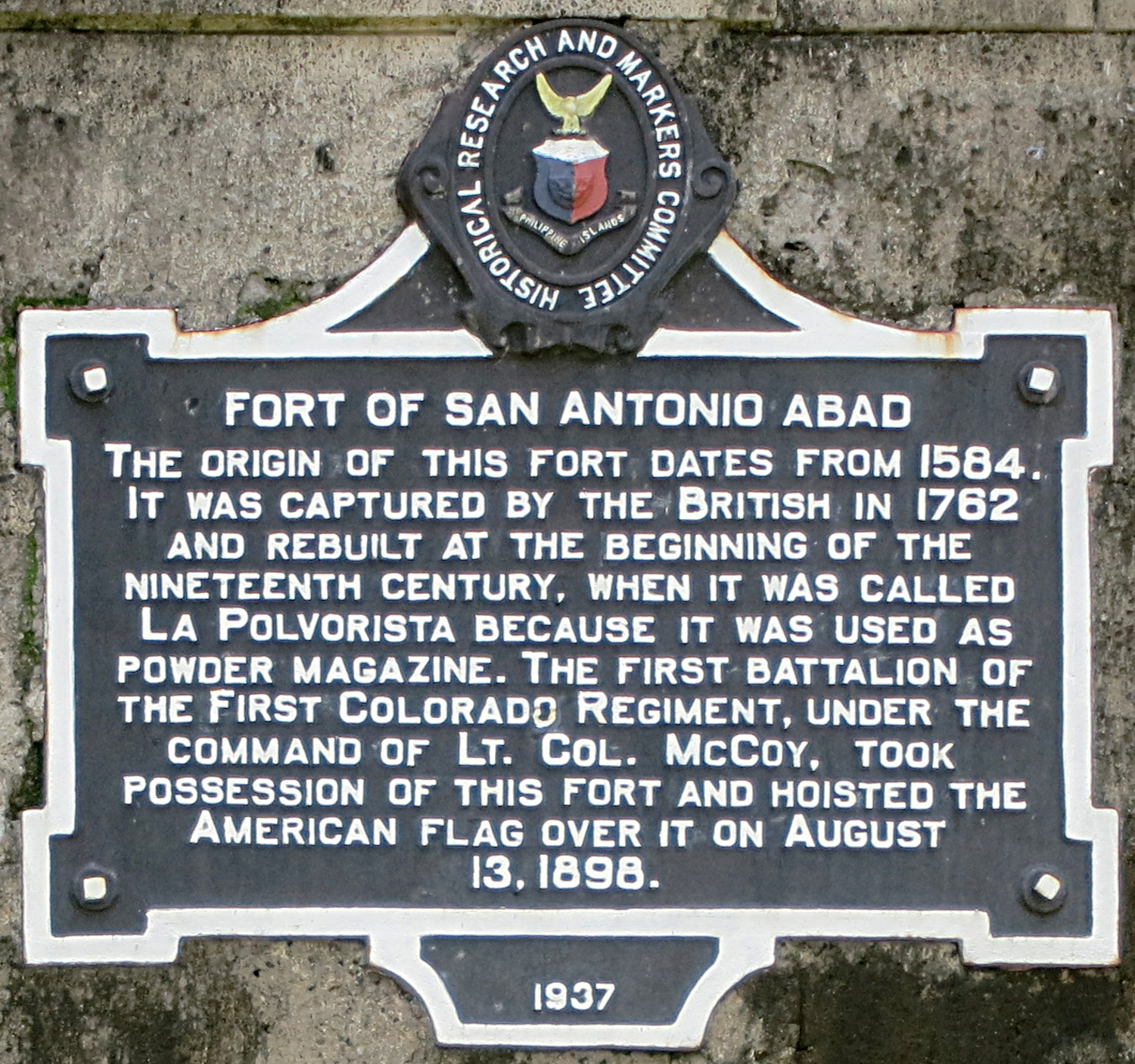
Historical marker installed by the Historical Research and Markers Committee in 1937

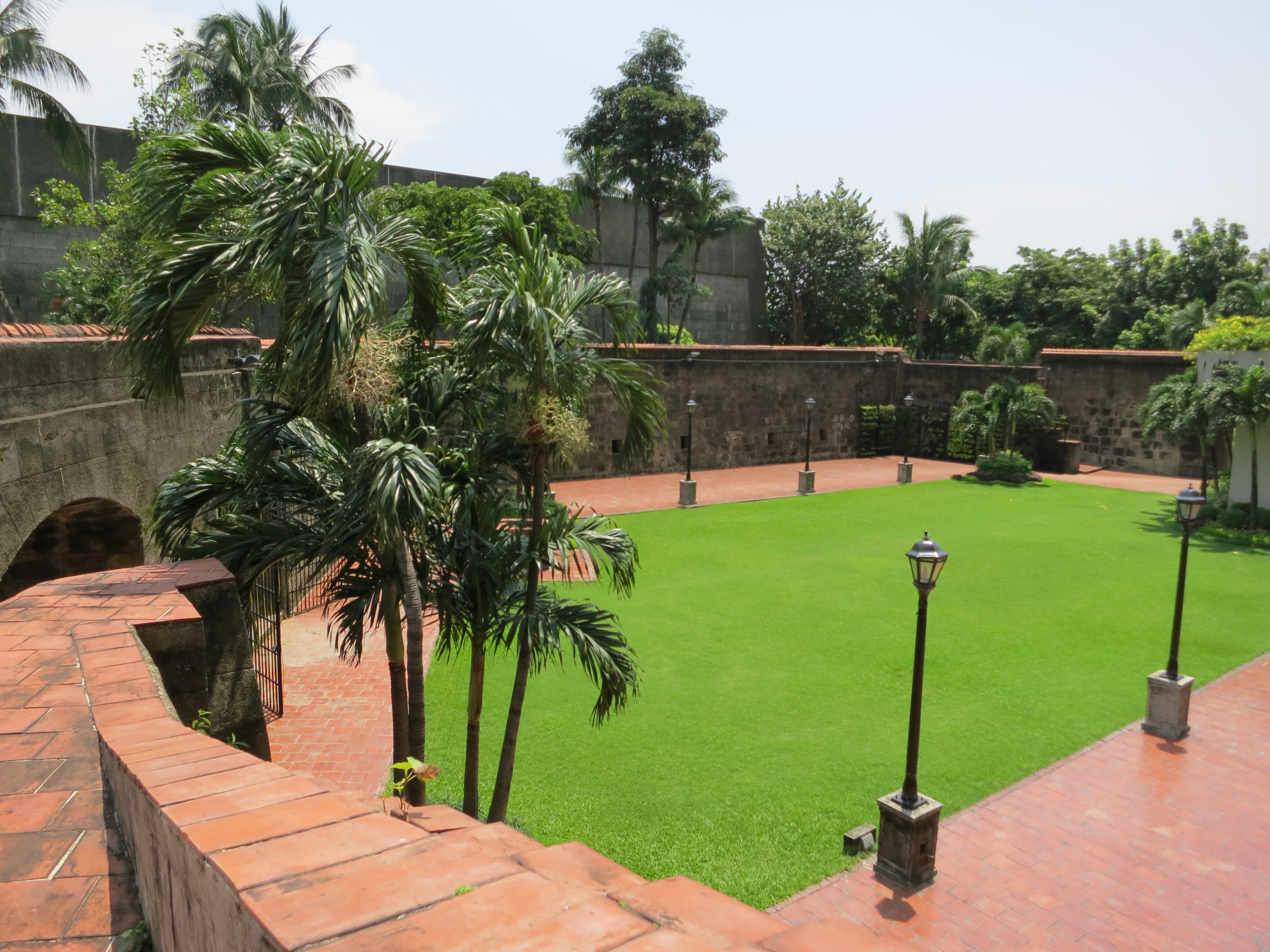
Interior of Fort San Antonio Abad in the Bangko Sentral Complex

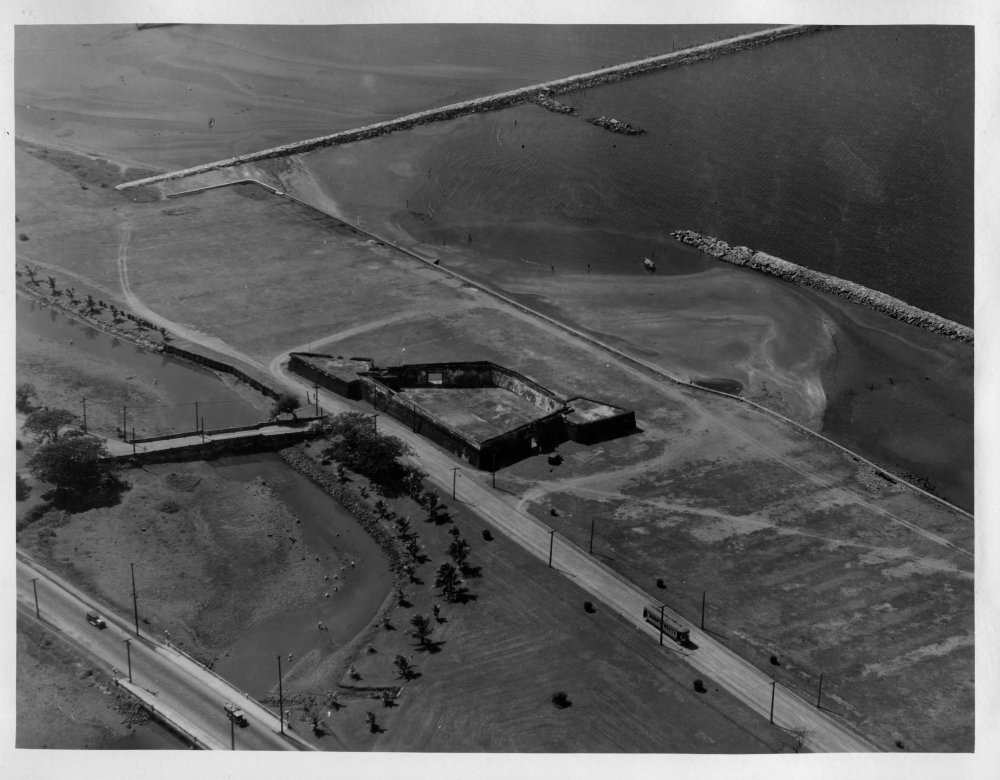
Aerial view of the fort during the American colonial period
