= Eugene E. Wing =

Commodore of the Manila Yacht Club

Commodore Eugene E. Wing (1883–1944) was the Commodore of the Manila Yacht Club when the Japanese invaded the Philippines in 1941, he sailed the Japanese blockade of Corregidor and was captured and executed with author Hugo Herman Miller for being attached to the Visayan Guerrilla Resistance on Leyte Island.

== Commodore of the Manila Yacht Club ==
Eugene Wing was the second Commodore of the Manila Yacht Club following the tenure of James C. Rockwell. According to the Yacht Club 50th anniversary history, Wing's tenure was 1940–1942, though the Club disbanded with the invasion of enemy forces in December 1941. On 28 December 1941, the club was officially dissolved, and members hastened to collect anything which might be of value to the advancing enemy, including the fine wines and distilled spirits remaining at the Club bar. Wing and Miller were preparing to sail for Corregidor aboard Wing's schooner the "Hope Wing," named for his daughter, Hope, when an enemy bomber squadron appeared overhead and began making runs on Pier 7. Later that day a platoon of United States Army Forces in the Far East troops arrived with orders to destroy the remaining boats to deny them to the enemy in anticipation of the assault on Fort Mills, Corregidor. The fine boats were drenched with gasoline and set ablaze.

== Corregidor Island and sailing the blockade ==
Arriving on Corregidor, Wing encountered Associated Press correspondent and best selling author, Clark Lee. Due to strict censorship, Lee was unable to transmit his stories to the AP and was in need of a boat to get off the island. He inventoried the available civilian vessels until locating what he characterized as "the ideal getaway boat," a 65-foot two masted schooner belonging to an executive from the Marsman Corporation. Eugene Wing was the only Marsman executive known to be present on Corregidor. Together Lee and Wing planned to sail the Japanese blockade and pored over navigational charts and worked in concert to gain a nautical compass from the Yusang and oil drums from the Army engineers.

In February 1942, following a month of preparations, Wing approached Lee with the message, "Ready to Sail". Lee declined the voyage as USAFFE was now allowing him to transmit his stories and he was needed by the AP to cover the Battle of Bataan.

On 10 February 1942, General Richard K. Sutherland, MacArthur's Chief of Staff gave permission to Wing to sail the blockade. Estimates were grim and there was considerable risk of being captured by the Japanese Navy. As if having slipped into the great black abyss of the South China Sea and the fog of war, little is known about what became of Miller and Wing from February 1942 until their capture in November 1943. It is known that they successfully circumnavigated the Japanese blockade, by starlight and sextant and under power of sail, ultimately reaching Leyte Island.

Leyte Island would become the reinvasion point for American forces and Leyte Gulf the site of the largest naval engagement in world history in 1944. See Battle of Leyte Gulf.

== Capture on Leyte Island ==
In Nov 1943, Commodore Eugene Wing and Hugo Herman Miller were captured during a major Japanese offensive against guerrilla and resistance forces throughout the Philippines. According to the military affidavits relating to their capture and execution, Wing and Miller were relocated to Samar Island where they were executed, by beheading, for their attachment to the Visayan Guerrilla resistance.

== Herbert Zipper's vow and concert ==
Following the Battle of Manila in 1945, conductor/composer and Holocaust survivor Herbert Zipper held a victory concert in the ruins of Santa Cruz Cathedral. The military reviewer of the concert, William J. Dunn, recorded that on 10 May 1945, Herbert Zipper fulfilled the vow he had conceived at Dachau concentration camp seven years prior to commemorate the downfall of the Nazi regime with a performance of Beethoven's 3rd Symphony "Eroica".
