= Admiral Hotel (Manila) =

Hotels in Manila, Philippines

Coordinates: 14.565296°N 120.985256°E

Admiral Hotel Manila, originally known as the Admiral Apartments, is one of the few remaining historic landmarks along Roxas Boulevard (then Dewey Boulevard) in Manila, Philippines. During its heyday, the Admiral Hotel was the social hub of the Philippine elite during the pre-war era.

== Features ==
The Admiral Hotel had room names like the Blue Room and the Spanish Room. Its main dining room, known as the Malayan Court had an imposing oil painting, by Antonio Dumlao, who was a budding artist during its time. The Spanish Room was the reception room while the Blue Room served as a small private dining room. It has here where Clare Booth Luce, then the US Ambassador to Italy and wife of Time, Life and Fortune Magazine publisher, Henry Luce, was honored with a party. The Admiral's cocktail lounge was called the Coconut Grove. The hotel was furnished in the same style as the Victoneta Mansion of the Aranetas in Mandaluyong.

== History ==
The historic building, built in 1939 was designed by an eminent Filipino architect, Fernando H. Ocampo in the traditional mode with a touch of revivalist style. The Admiral Hotel was built by the Lopez-Araneta Family. Construction started in 1938 and completed in 1939. The building was inaugurated on July 8, 1939, with Manuel L. Quezon as the guest of honor. During its heyday, the Admiral Hotel was the tallest building in Manila and thus became a landmark by seafarers docking to Manila Bay.

During World War II, the Admiral Hotel was occupied by the Imperial Japanese Navy as their headquarters. After the Liberation of Manila, the US American High Command rented the building to become their headquarters. One of the guest of the American High Command who stayed at the Admiral Hotel during the Liberation of Manila was Prince Louis Mountbatten, the uncle of Prince Philip of England.

In 2009, the Admiral Hotel was sold by the Lopez-Araneta Family to a condominium developer, Anchor Land Holdings, Inc. who plans to redevelop the historic building into a boutique hotel.

In 2014, Anchor Land Holdings signed a joint venture agreement with Accor Hotels to redevelop the property as Admiral Hotel Manila - MGallery to be completed by 2017.
