= Manila Dolomite Beach =

Urban beach in Manila, Philippines

- Beach
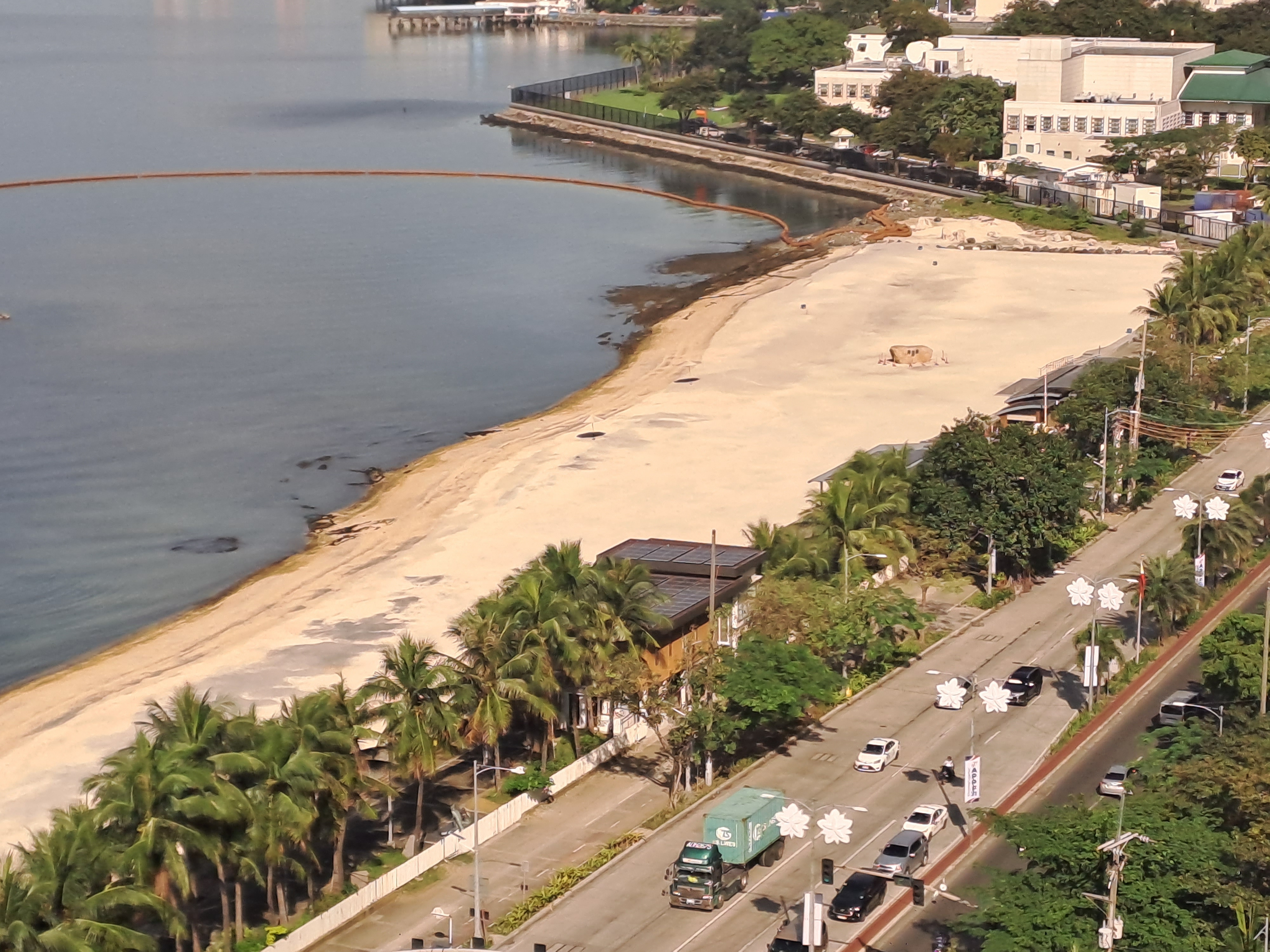
- The beach in November 2023

- Location within Manila
- Coordinates: 14°34′27.60″N 120°58′35.58″E
- Location: Manila, Philippines
- Water bodies: Manila Bay

Dimensions
  - Length: 500 meters (1,600 ft)
- Creation: 2020–2021

Manila Baywalk Dolomite Beach, commonly known as Dolomite Beach, is an artificial beach along Manila Bay in Manila, Philippines created through the process of beach nourishment. It is part of an overall integrated coastal zone management aimed at coastal defense of the Manila Bay Rehabilitation project. The beach was planned to cover a total length of 900 meters of the Manila Baywalk. The beach was first opened from September 19 to 20, 2020, but was closed for expansion. The artificial beach was declared complete in October 2022.

== Background ==
The Supreme Court of the Philippines issued a Writ of Continuing Mandamus in 2008, with the full resolution released in 2011, ordering government agencies and the private sector to rehabilitate Manila Bay to a condition that would make it safe for recreational activities, including swimming.

Dolomite Beach is a project of the Department of Environment and Natural Resources (DENR). It is a part of the Manila Bay Rehabilitation Program launched by Secretary Roy Cimatu in January 2019. It is an integral part of the integrated coastal zone management aimed at coastal defense of the Manila Bay Rehabilitation. Budget for the project was approved prior to the COVID-19 pandemic. It was allocated for the beach nourishment, coastal restoration and enhancement of the Manila Baywalk area. Works on the project began in August 2020, when the government issued a permit to Philippine Mining Service Corporation to transport crushed dolomite from Alcoy, Cebu to Manila. Dolomite mining operations were suspended by the DENR in September 2020.

== Beach ==
Dolomite Beach was created through the process of beach nourishment, which is a common practice in the creation of beaches around the world. Upon the extraction of debris in the 500 meters (1,600 ft) portion of the baywalk from the Manila Yacht Club to the United States Embassy in Manila, the project proponents dumped two layers of ordinary sand before overlaying it with crushed dolomite.

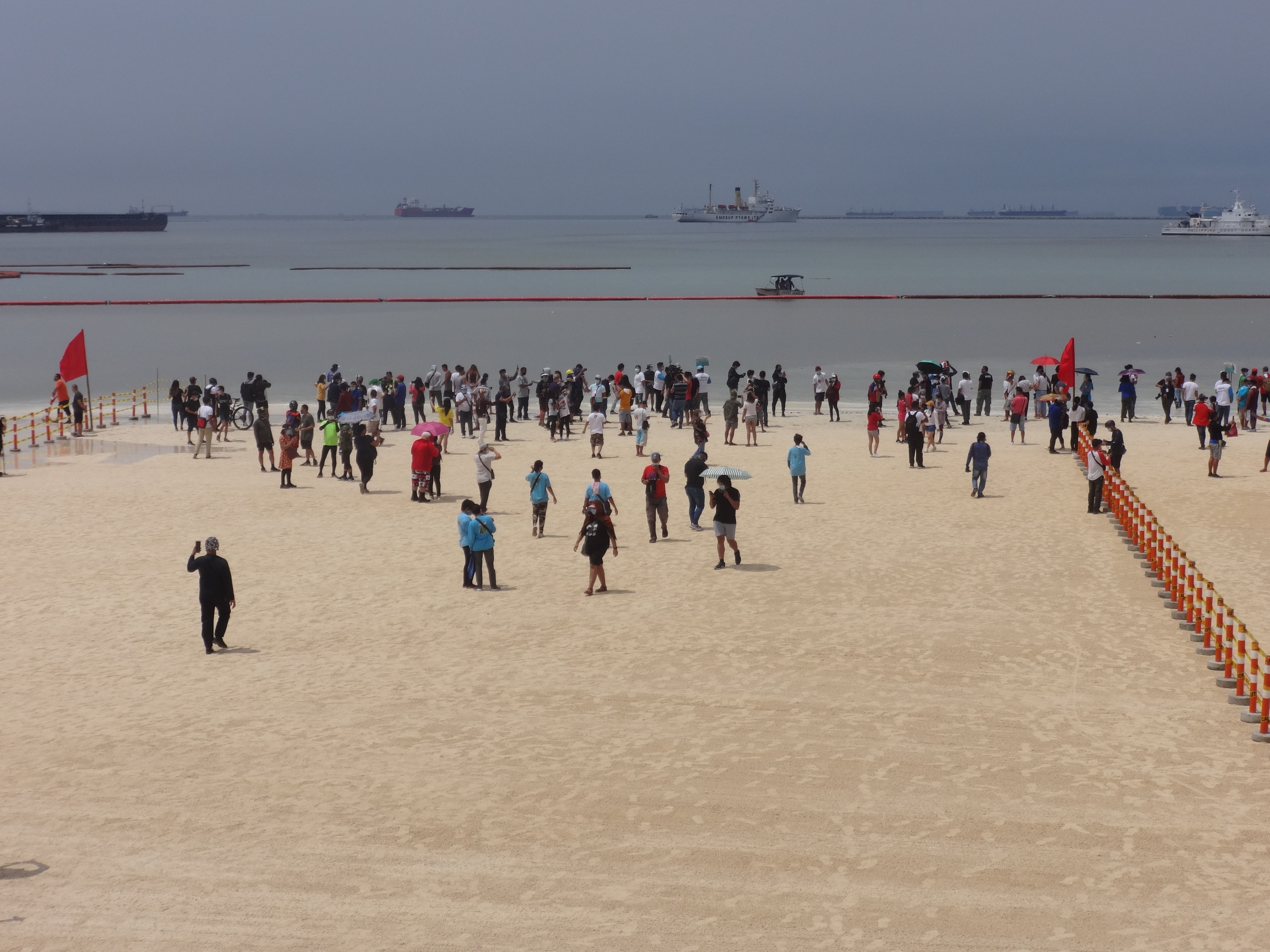
Manila Bay beach during its temporary opening

The beach was first opened to the public from September 19 to 20, 2020. Afterwards, it was closed again for expansion. Originally, the beach was to be completed by December 2020, but it was pushed back in 2021. On January 17, 2021, DENR Undersecretary Benny Antiporda stated that the overlaying of crushed dolomite for a 500-meter portion of the beach would take one to two months to complete.

After the onslaught of Typhoon Vamco (Ulysses) in November, the beach was dumped with garbage, with the DENR denying reports that the dolomite was washed away, saying that black sand was washed in to the beach. After a series of typhoons in late 2020, the DENR replenished the beach with a new batch of crushed dolomite rock.

A new coat of dolomite sand was laid over the beach in April 2021.

On July 18, 2021, the beach was reopened to the public without an announcement. By September 2021, an entrance arch was installed bearing the name of the site: "Manila Baywalk Dolomite Beach". The beach was opened again on October 17, 2021. The beach was reopened again on June 12, 2022, after it was closed again for expansion.

In October 2022, the DENR declared the beach complete with no budget allocated for any potential development given for 2023.

=== Design ===
The beach nourishment project was carried out by the Department of Public Works and Highways (DPWH) in coordination with the DENR and is a part of the Manila Bay Rehabilitation. The beach had a total planned length of 900 meters (3,000 ft), starting from the tip of the United States Embassy in Manila, and a width of 60 meters (200 ft) from the starting from the shores of Manila Baywalk. The whole project, which consists of the beach nourishment, coastal restoration and enhancement of the Manila Baywalk area covers the whole area starting from the southernmost tip of the US Embassy up to the Breakwater of the Manila Yacht Club. The DPWH plans to build a new breakwater, in addition to geotubes, to protect the beach from storm surges and prevent the dolomite sands from washing out. The proposed breakwater will also protect low-lying areas in Manila, Pasay, Las Piñas and Parañaque. The University of the Philippines Marine Science Institute (UP MSI) and the UP Institute of Environmental Science and Meteorology (UP IESM) said that dolomite sand will be washed out to sea by storm surges and intense rainfall.

The DENR said that the project was not in the National Economic and Development Authority's list of infrastructure projects under the Manila Bay Sustainable Development Master Plan.

== Impact ==
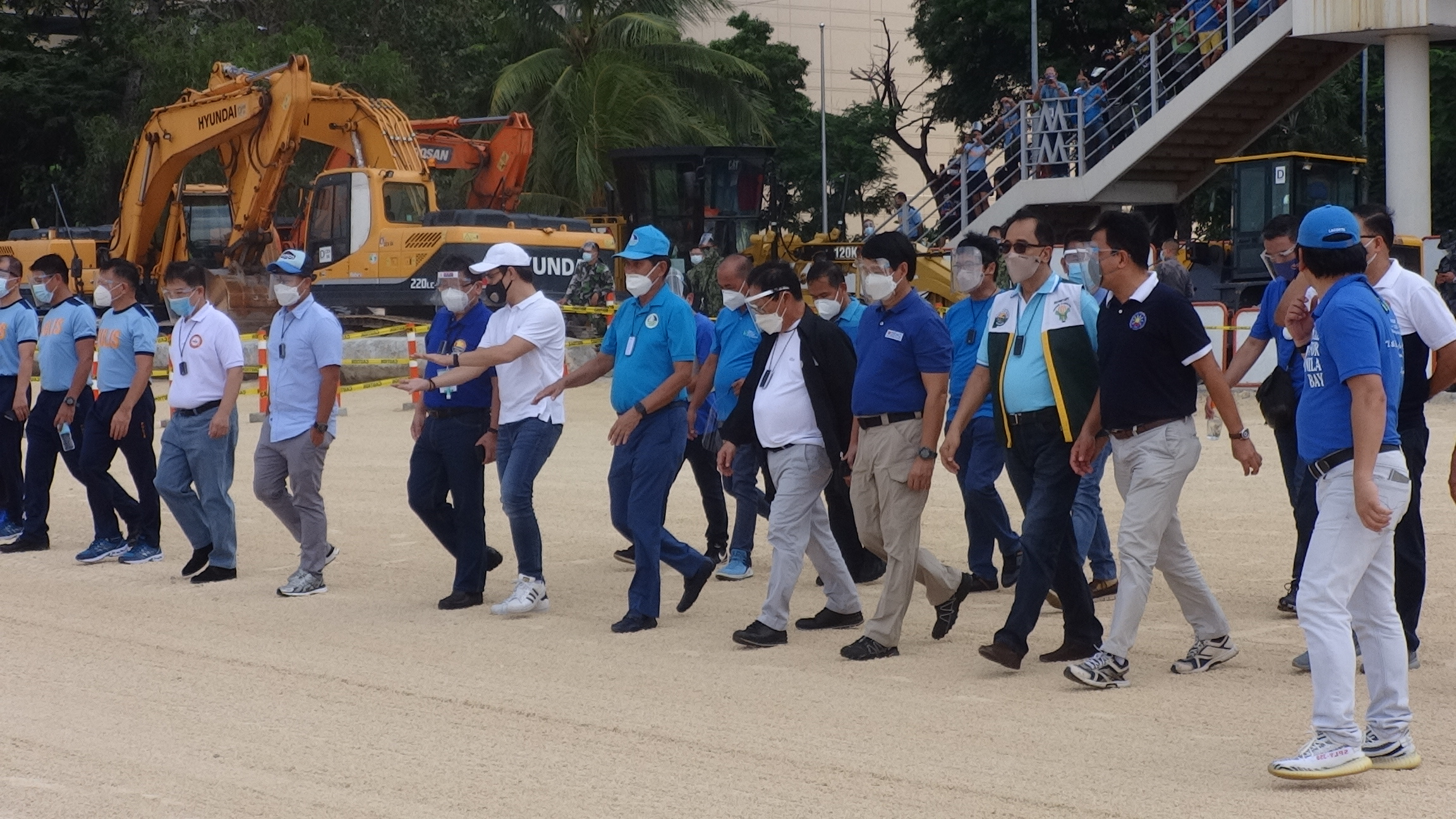
Government officials inspect progress of the beach project.

According to the Mines and Geosciences Bureau, the project will benefit tourism, commerce and the environment. It will also protect coastal properties from erosion and storm surges and beach nourishment are preferred projects over hard beach stabilizing structures (such as seawalls and groynes).

=== Environment ===
The Department of Environment and Natural Resources has maintained that the dolomite used to create the beach poses no harm to Manila Bay's ecosystem. The laying of dolomite has been suspected as a possible cause for a fish kill on September 17, 2020, near the waters of the Baseco Compound. The DENR countered the claim, saying that the fish kill happened 5 kilometers (3.1 mi) away from the beach and cited the prevalence of the southwest monsoon at that time, and the presence of a breakwater between the site and adjacent waters of the beach that prohibits the transfer of sand.

As with other beach nourishment projects, the area can serve as additional habitat for a number of species such as sea turtles, as well as sea birds and beach flora. When the beach was first opened to the public, a flock of egrets were seen at the beach area.

Environmental groups said that the required environmental impact studies were not done for the Dolomite Beach project.

Environmental organization Oceana Philippines and fisherfolk organization Pambansang Lakas ng Kilusang Mamamalakaya ng Pilipinas (Pamalakaya) warned of the project's potential harm to the Manila Bay's environment, the natural ecosystem, and coastal integrity.

Pamalakaya also said that dolomite sand may contain heavy metals such as aluminum, lead, and mercury that would contribute to pollution and acidity in Manila Bay. Fernando Hicap of Pamalakaya questioned the DENR for "leading a campaign that could increase and cause further harm to the bay".

Youth environmental group Wavefarers described the project as a superficial solution and called on the DENR to restore the local ecosystem by replanting mangroves, which would have actual long-term benefits. The group said that mangrove trees "can help restore the bay because these are known to filter and store metals, which help keep coastal waters clean and safe for humans and other species". Wavefarers said that Manila Bay was once composed of mangrove forests, coral reefs, seagrass beds, and tidal flats. The few remaining mangroves are being destroyed by reclamation projects, the group said.

Pamalakaya and Wavefarers said in a joint statement, "The fishing people of Manila Bay don't need synthetic white sand, but authentic rehabilitation that would restore its abundant ecosystems and fishing resources for the benefit of the Filipinos."

The DENR said that dolomite will help neutralize acidity in Manila Bay's waters. The UP MSI said that the dolomite sand's effects on acidification is negligible given the scale of potential ocean acidification.

UP IESM that the Dolomite Beach project will be "environmentally damaging" as dolomite sand that washes out to see will disturb plant and animal habitats, lower oxygen in the seawater, and block sunlight. UP IESM stated that, "These outcomes endanger the biodiversity of the area. The polluted waters discharging to Manila Bay are already causing the degradation of its marine environment. The addition of sediments only hastens its deterioration".

=== Water quality ===
In February 2021, the Department of Environment and Natural Resources reported significant drop of fecal coliform level in the waters around the beach. Fecal coliform level in Manila Bay dropped from 7.16 million most probable number per 100 milliliters (mpn/100ml) in 2020 to 4.87 million mpn/100ml in February 2021, while the fecal coliform level around the beach has dropped from 2.2 million mpn/100ml last January 4 to 523,000 mpn/100 ml on February 8, based on the average count from three monitoring stations.

By June 2022, two water quality monitoring stations near the beach registered lower fecal coliform levels – from 7,300 MPN/100mL to 1,700 MPN/100mL, and from 10,200 MPN/100mL to 2,100 MPN/100mL, respectively.

The government discourages swimming on waters off the beach, however, as the waters' fecal coliform level is still far from the ideal 100 mpn/100ml.

=== Flooding ===
In July 2025, Metropolitan Manila Development Authority stated that the Dolomite Beach project exacerbated flooding in Metro Manila, stating that the Dolomite Beach blocked the key drainage systems of Faura, Remedios, and Estero de San Antonio Abad. During rains, water was made to pass through sewage system and had to be blocked before being discharged to the Dolomite Beach. The DENR said that it was looking for "science-based" methods to solving flooding in Metro Manila.

In November 2025, after Typhoon Tino brought severe flooding in Metro Cebu, the Cebu City council and Kilusang Magbubukid ng Pilipinas said that dolomite quarrying in upland areas have resulted in environmental degradation that leads to flooding in lowland barangays.

== Reception ==
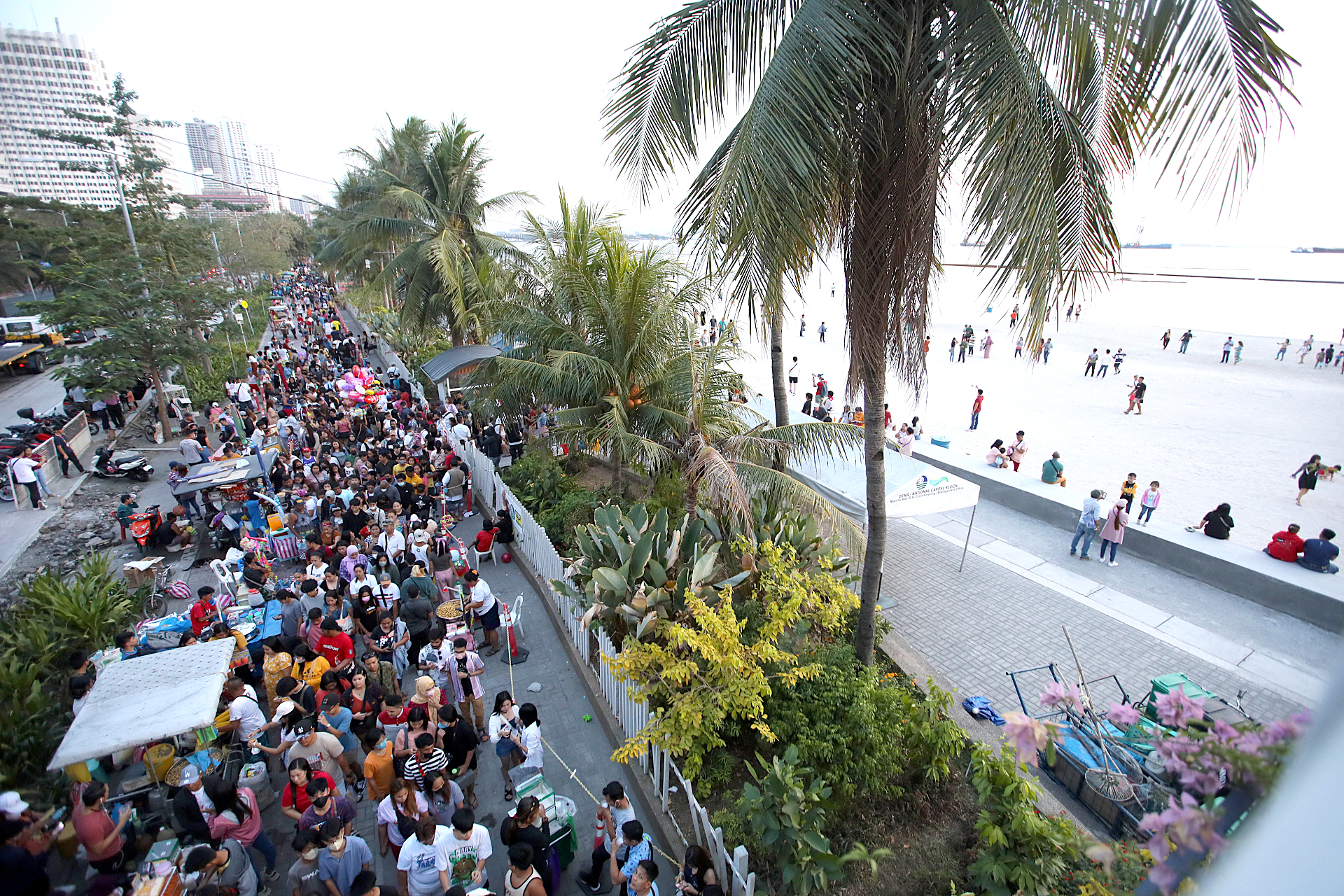
Entrance to the Dolomite Beach along Roxas Boulevard packed with visitors on March 19, 2023

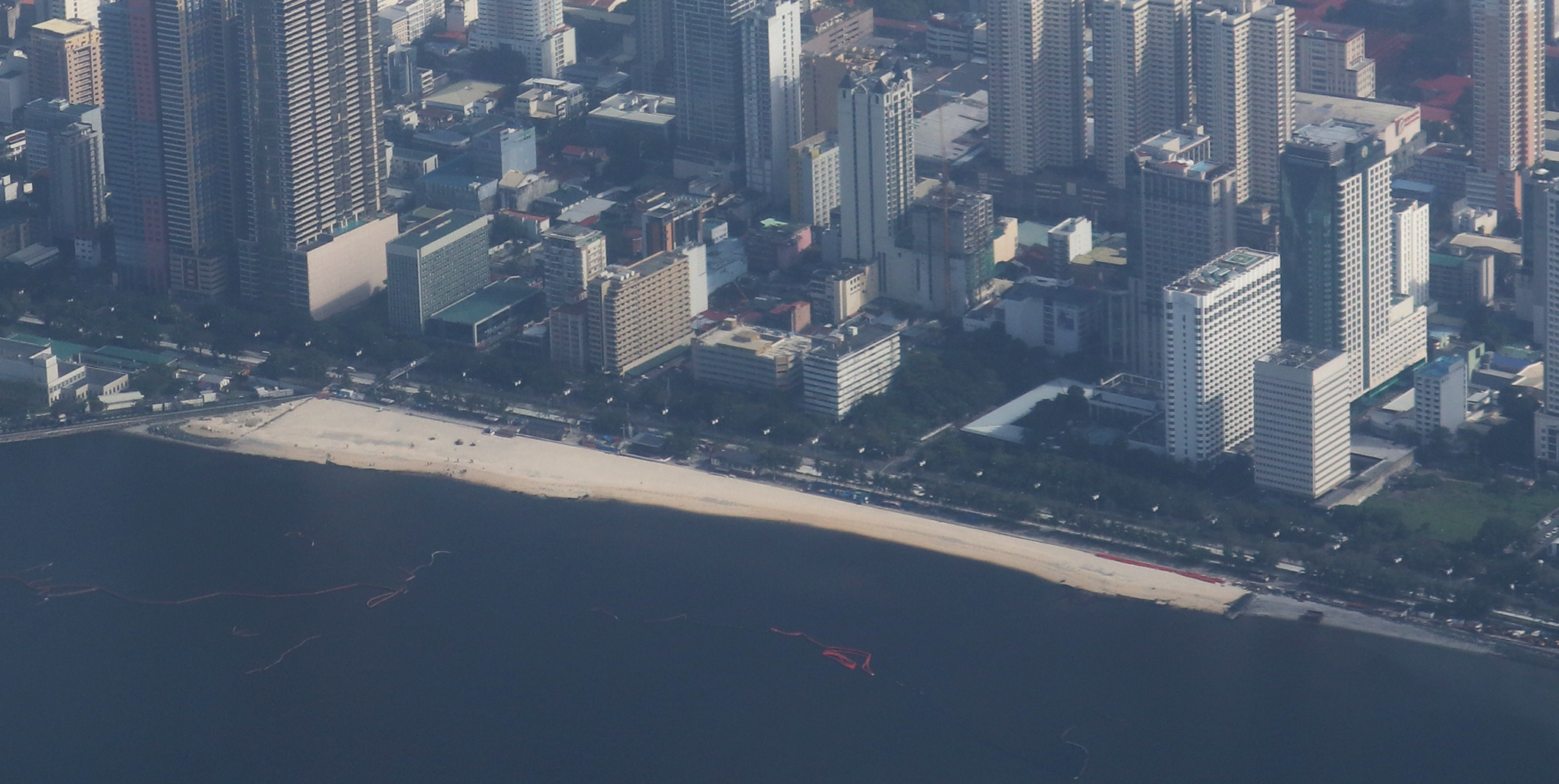
Dolomite Beach along Roxas Boulevard, January 2023

The project has received support from the Manila city government led by Mayor Isko Moreno. President Rodrigo Duterte also voiced his support to the project. Likewise, Secretary Roy Cimatu, seeing the throngs of people during the September 2020 opening, said that the project received the overwhelming support of the general public. On its partial opening in September, people crowded the beach and the nearby area that physical distancing were not properly observed. Vloggers have been posting positive updates regarding the project, which DENR Undersecretary Benny Antiporda cited as an "effective way in informing the public" about the project.

However, the project received criticism from activists, environmentalists, and heritage conservationist groups. Among those targeted by the criticisms were the timing of the project, which was implemented amidst the COVID-19 pandemic, and concerns of adverse environmental effects from the laying of dolomite on the polluted Manila Bay.

=== Use of public funds ===
Three senators also voiced their opposition to the project: Nancy Binay, Risa Hontiveros and Francis "Kiko" Pangilinan. Binay cited the lack of public consultation on the project, as well as the lack of study regarding the effects of the use of dolomite sands. Both Hontiveros and Pangilinan argued that the funds for the project should have been used on public health and relief goods instead. Akbayan filed a case with the Supreme Court to penalize the Department of Environment and Natural Resources for pursuing the project, but the petition was junked. Oceana Philippines said that the project "will be a total waste of people’s money".

When asked about the criticism that the money spent on the project could have been better spent on the response to the COVID-19 pandemic, Presidential spokesman Harry Roque said that he did not "buy that argument" because caring for the people's mental health is also needed, pointing out that if people are to visit the beach, the mental health effects on them cannot be quantified.

=== Laying of crushed dolomite ===
The DENR's Mines and Geosciences Bureau approved the extraction of dolomite, while environment committee of the Cebu provincial board said it did not issue a permit to extract and transport dolomite to Manila Bay. The Cebu provincial board directed the Cebu Provincial Environment and Natural Resources Office to investigate.

The University of the Philippines Marine Science Institute (MSI) disapproved of the laying of crushed dolomite sand for the creation of the beach, saying that this will not improve the water quality in Manila Bay and that a continuous replenishment of the sand would be expensive. The UP Institute of Biology said that using mangroves instead of crushed dolomite rock would be better for rehabilitation, adding that the International Union for Conservation of Nature prefers this as an effective nature-based solution. Undersecretary Antiporda did not agree with the suggestion of the UP Marine Science Institute, calling them paid hacks, and that being from a state university the state should not be paying them. Antiporda said that the government has paid UP "half a billion pesos" for consultations. Laura David, the director of UP MSI, said that the university charged the government just over 364 million pesos. Antiporda later apologized for his statement, calling UP's criticism "painful"; David accepted Antiporda's apology, and called the back and forth a "misunderstanding".

==== Health ====
Department of Health Undersecretary Maria Rosario Vergeire initially stated that inhaling dusts of the crushed dolomite would adversely affect the respiratory system. She added later that though dolomite in its bulk form is not a known health hazard, crushed dolomite are irritants that could cause "chest discomfort, shortness of breath, and coughing". Dolomite sand could also cause stomach pain and diarrhea if ingested.

A toxicology expert from the University of the Philippine-Manila College of Medicine warned that crushed dolomite might contain toxic heavy metals and silica dust that may cause cancer, respiratory and kidney problems, and weakened immunity.

=== Request to suspend project ===
In September 2020, Kalikasan People's Network for the Environment requested Manila Mayor Isko Moreno to stop the project, citing possible degradation of nearby marine conservation areas. The group said that the recent discovery of Sardinella pacifica in the area qualifies Manila Bay as a potential sardine conservation spot.

In September 2020, fisherfolk organization Pamalakaya requested the DENR to suspend the project after the DENR suspended two dolomite mining companies in Alcoy, Cebu. The two mining firms that provided the dolomite for the Dolomite Beach, Dolomite Mining Corporation and the Philippine Mining Service Corporation, were also ordered to halt operations by Cebu Provincial Governor Gwendolyn Garcia.

== Investigation ==
Representative Antonio Tinio of ACT Party-list supported the holding of a Congressional probe on the Manila Dolomite Beach project, stating in November 2025 that the investigation should include former President Rodrigo Duterte's role in spearheding the project.

== See also ==
- Baseco Beach
