= Admiral Hotel (Mobile, Alabama) =

Historic hotel in Alabama, United States

The Admiral Hotel
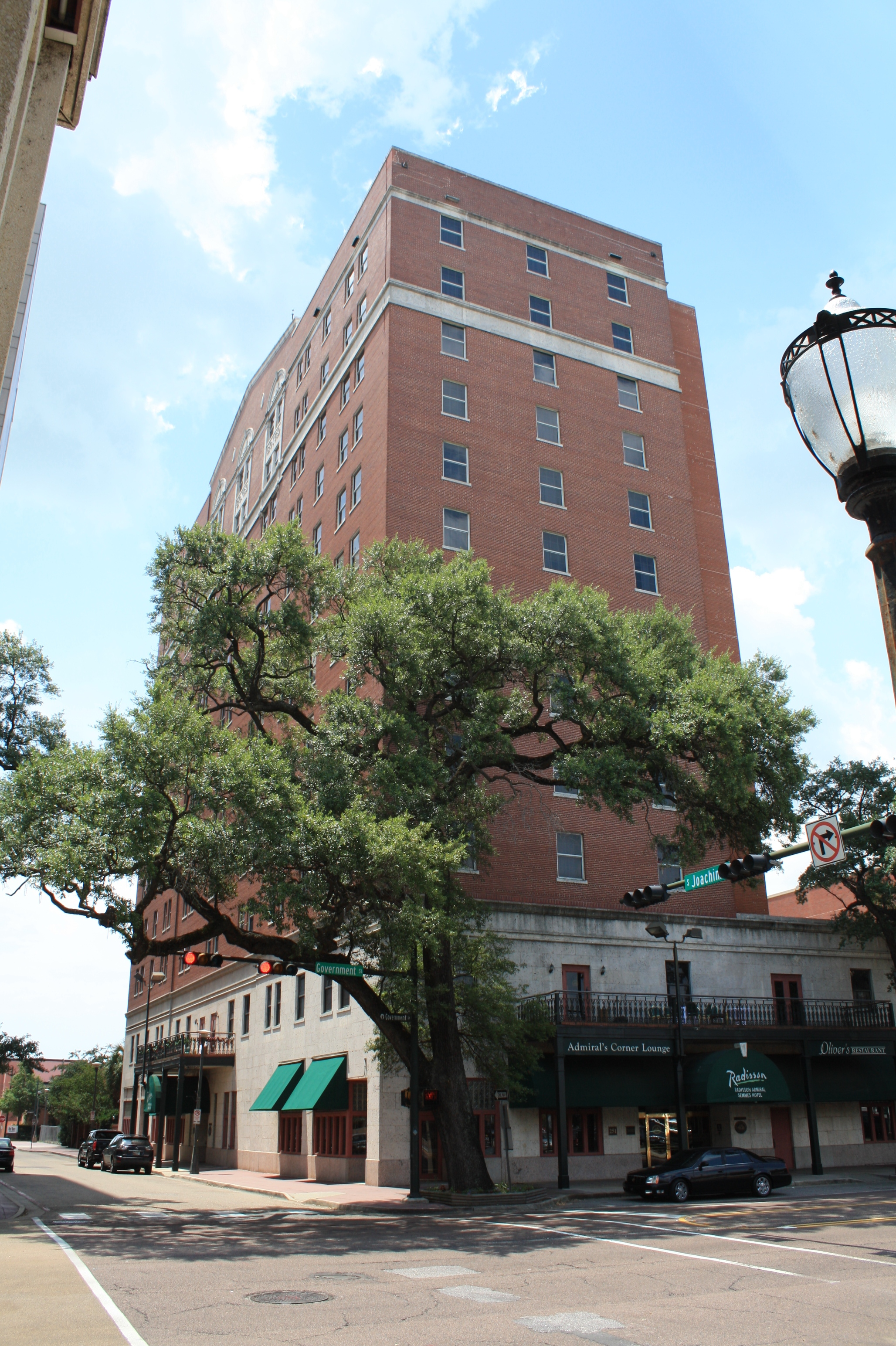
- Former names: The Admiral Semmes Hotel
- Alternative names: The Admiral

General information
- Type: Hotel
- Architectural style: depression era art deco style
- Location: 251 Government St., Mobile, Alabama
- Coordinates: 30.6891°N 88.0432°W
- Opened: 1940
- Renovated: 2014-2015
- Renovation cost: $27 Million
- Owner: Avocet Hospitality
- Landlord: Charlestowne Hotels

The Admiral Hotel is a historic hotel located in downtown Mobile, Alabama.

== History ==
The Hotel Admiral Semmes opened in November 1940, named for Raphael Semmes, captain of the Confederate commerce raider CSS Alabama. The 251-room hotel was constructed in 15 months, at a cost of $1 million. It was the first hotel in Mobile to provide air conditioning and telephones in every guest room and featured a coffee shop, a drug store, cocktail lounge and a National Airlines office.

In the 1950s, a motel wing was added across the street, the Admiral Semmes Motor Hotel. In the late 1960s and 1970s, singer Jimmy Buffett performed regularly at the hotel's Admiral's Corner Lounge.

The hotel closed in 1978 and was converted to a retirement home, Admiral Semmes Manor. It was badly damaged soon after, by Hurricane Frederic, in 1979, and closed entirely. In 1982, the vacant building was sold, along with a nearby vacant Elks Lodge, to realtor Arthur Pope, for $975,000. In 1983, the hotel structure was sold again, to a Dallas-based developer, for $1.8 million. The hotel was completely restored and the rooms were enlarged, reducing their number to 170. It reopened in 1985, managed by Radisson Hotels as the Radisson Admiral Semmes Hotel.

In 1989, it was one of the 32 founding hotels in the National Trust for Historic Preservation's Historic Hotels of America program.

In 2014 after being purchased by the Mississippi-based Thrash Group for $4 million, it underwent an extensive, $27 million renovation, which reduced the room count further, to 156 rooms. The renovations were overseen by architect James Flick of Dallas-based Flick Mars.

It reopened on November 17, 2015 as The Admiral Hotel Mobile, Curio Collection by Hilton, part of Hilton's Curio Collection brand. The name Admiral Semmes was changed due to Semmes's connection to the Confederacy. In April 2020, the hotel joined Wyndham Hotels & Resorts, and was renamed The Admiral, A Wyndham Hotel. In June 2022, it was sold to Charleston, South Carolina-based Avocet Hospitality Group for $21 million and renamed The Admiral Hotel.

== Description ==
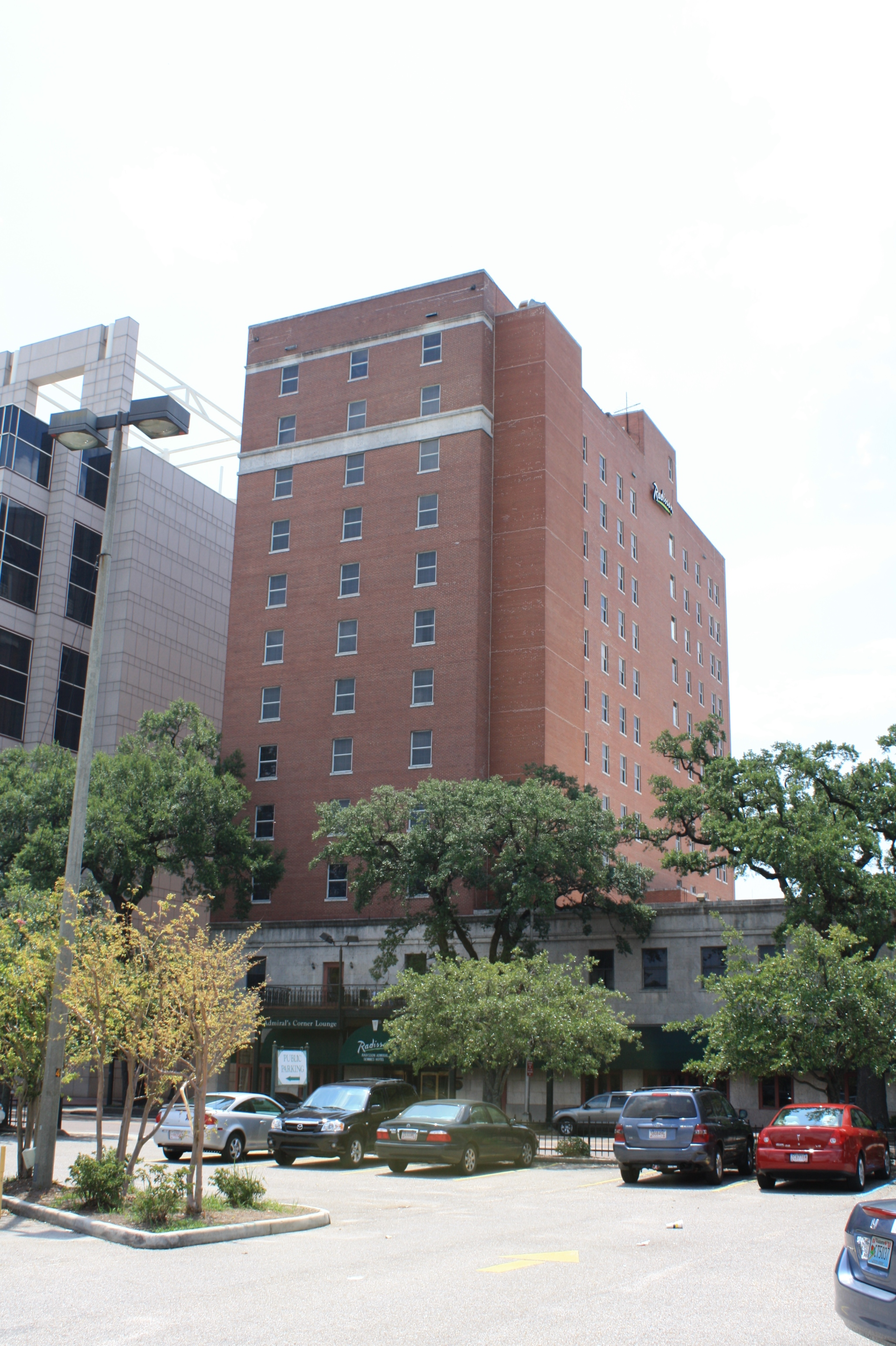
Another view, in 2009

The building is 12-stories high and originally had 251 guest rooms. It now has 156 standard guest rooms and five luxury, multi-room suites on the top floor. It has a depression-era style and maintains its art deco features, including the elevator doors. The interior has a more opulent look with marble floors, and oval balcony overlooking the lobby, a large spiral staircase and a chandelier.

The hotel now features two restaurants and an outdoor pool as well as the original meeting spaces. There are eight event areas, including a ballroom, comprising 6,795 sq ft (631.3 m^{2}).
