= Palacio de Memoria =

- Interactive map of the Palacio de Memoria area
- Former names: Villaroman Mansion

General information
- Status: Completed
- Architectural style: Spanish Revival
- Location: Parañaque, Philippines
- Coordinates: 14°31′12.1″N 120°59′39.9″E
- Current tenants: Casa de Memoria (auction house)
- Completed: 1920s
- Opened: March 2019; 7 years ago
- Renovated: mid-2010s
- Owner: Lhuillier Family

Technical details
- Floor count: 7

Renovating team
- Architect: Miguel Rosales

Website
- www.palaciodememoria.com

The Palacio de Memoria ("Palace of Memory") is a historic mansion in Parañaque, Metro Manila, Philippines. It is currently owned by the Lhuillier Family, and is used as an events venue. It also host an auction house, known as the Casa de Memoria.

== History ==
There are no records regarding Palacio de Memoria's builders or its original owners although it is known to have been built in the 1920s and have survived the Battle of Manila of World War II.

The mansion came into possession by Francisco Villaroman, a physician and surgeon, sometime after the war. Villaroman expanded the two-storey structure, which became known as the Villaroman Mansion, by adding five additional floors and an observation deck. Diplomat and businessman Philippe Lhuillier and his family bought the property from the Villaromans in the early 2000s. The mansion was abandoned for around 20 years at the time it was acquired by the Lhuilliers. It underwent renovations in the mid-2010s through the initiatives of sisters Camille Lhuillier and Angelique Lhuillier. The house was opened to the public in March 2019.

In 2022, Palacio de Memoria received a marker for Adaptive Reuse from the National Commission for Culture and the Arts. The marker recognizes the mansion's engineering integrity and efforts to keep the authenticity of the building or structure design in order to conserve the site. The mansion was used in FPJ's Batang Quiapo.

== Architecture and design ==
The Palacio de Memoria's original design is described to be an example of Spanish Revival architecture with its exterior exhibiting Filipino Art Deco design. The mansion has seven-floors and its facade is white. While the original architect of the mansion is unknown; Filipino architect Juan Arellano is believed to be involved in the mansion's original design in some capacity. The Lhuillers attribute the Art Deco curves of the grand staircase and terrazo flooring to Juan Nakpil. The residence also has a swimming pool.

When the Villaromans expanded the building, there was no conscious effort for the additional floors and elements to conform with the mansion's original Spanish Revival style. The mansion's renovation under the Lhuilliers was led by creative consultant Miguel Rosales who drew inspiration from the works of American architect Addison Mizner who is reputed for his Old World-style mansions in Florida.

== Tenants ==
After the Lhuillier family renovated the house, the Palacio de Memoria was opened to the public with selected areas of the property made available for rent for events. The mansion also hosts the Casa de Memoria, an auction house established in 2016, which auctions off Asian and European antiques.
