= Manila Yacht Club =

Sailing and rowing club in Manila, Philippines

- Burgee
- Founded: 1927
- Location: Roxas Boulevard, Manila, Philippines
- Commodore: Marco Tronqued
- Website: myc.org.ph

The Manila Yacht Club (MYC) is a members-only yacht club based in Manila, Philippines, and located in Manila Bay. The club is one of the oldest sports organizations in the country.

== History ==
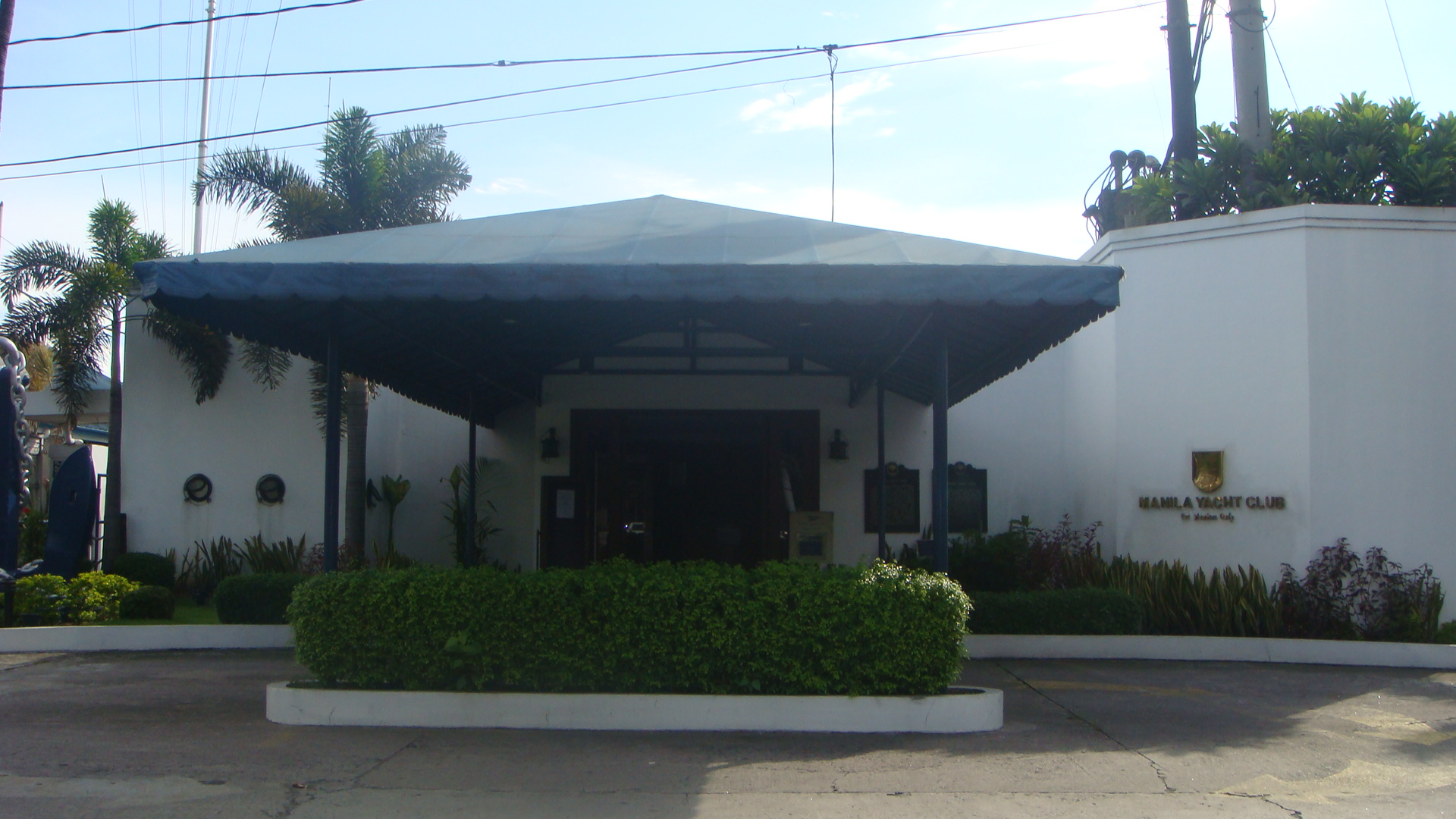
Manila Yacht Club

The Manila Yacht Club (MYC) was established on January 20, 1927, with its first by-laws signed by five yachtsmen: James C. Rockwell, Joseph A. Thomas, Aubrey P. Ames, Stewart E. Tait, and A.S. Heyward.

Operations of the club ceased following the outbreak of World War II when the Japanese began invading the islands in December 1941. After the war in 1945, the US Navy occupied the club. In 1947, the MYC was able to secure its property back and also began admitting female members.

On July 20, 2006, the National Historical Institute (now the National Historical Commission of the Philippines) installed historical markers at the MYC Building.

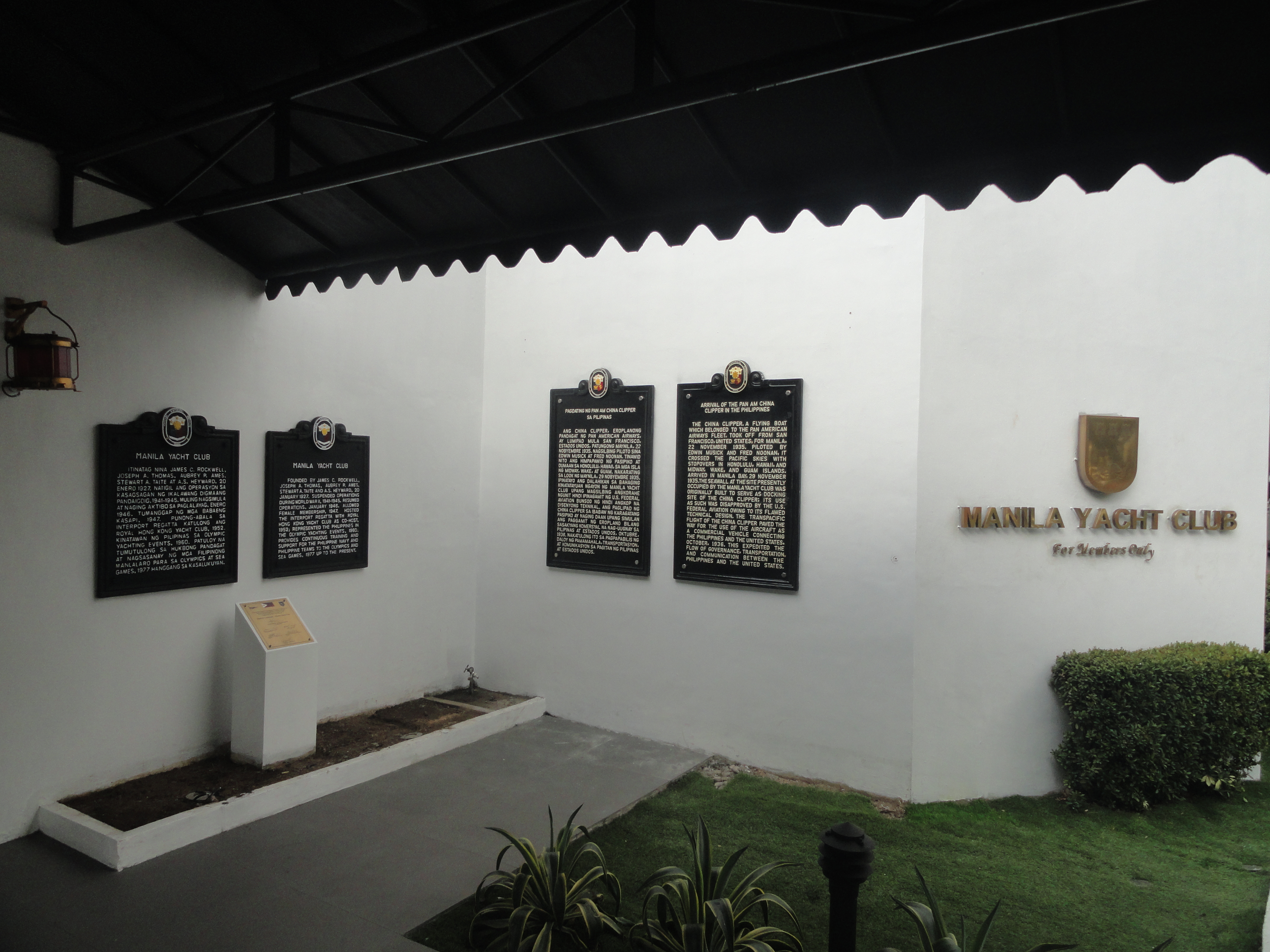
Manila Yacht Club NHCP historical markers

In 2024, the National Historical Commission unveiled a historical marker at the yacht club, honoring the arrival of China Clipper to the Philippines in 1935. The aircraft took off from San Francisco, carrying 110,000 letters in cargo. It landed in Manila Bay at the site presently occupied by the yacht club. The event paved the way for future of transpacific flights from the US to Southeast Asia.

== Involvement in sports ==
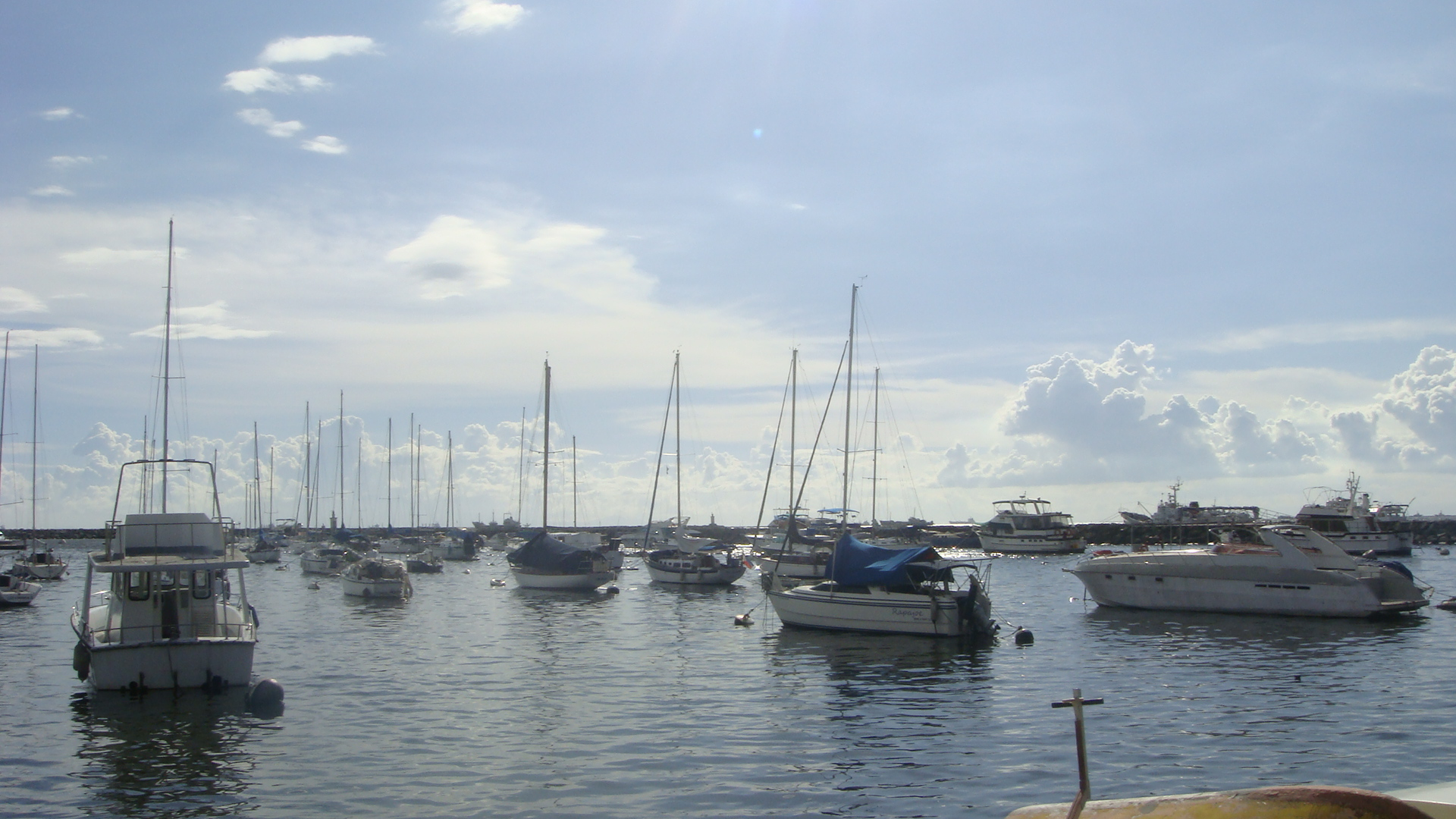
Members' docked yachts at its marina in Manila Bay

Along with the Philippine Sailing Association, the MYC promotes the sport of sailing. It has organized and participated in regattas. Its members have represented the Philippines in international competitions such as the SEA Games and Asian Games.

== Coast guard ==
MYC members are part of the 101st Squadron Philippine Coast Guard auxiliary. As part of PCG they do environmental cleanups and medical missions.

== Commodores ==
- Eugene E. Wing (1940–1942)
- Marco Tronqued (2021–present)
