= Plaza de Armas =

Plaza de Armas may refer to:

== Places ==
- Plaza de Armas (urban design), in Spanish-speaking countries, a major city square

=== Argentina ===
- Plaza de Mayo, in Buenos Aires

=== Chile ===
- Plaza de Armas (Santiago)
  - Plaza de Armas metro station

=== Cuba ===
- Plaza de Armas (Havana)

=== Dominican Republic ===
- Parque Colón, in Santo Domingo

=== Guatemala ===
- Plaza de la Constitución (Guatemala City), in Guatemala City

=== Mexico ===
- Plaza de Armas (Guadalajara)
- Plaza de Armas (Puerto Vallarta)

=== Peru ===
- Plaza Mayor, Arequipa, in Arequipa
- Plaza de Armas (Ayacucho)
- Plaza Mayor, Cajamarca, in Cajamarca
- Plaza de Armas (Cusco)
- Plaza Mayor, Lima
- Plaza de Armas of Trujillo (Peru)

=== Paraguay ===
- Plaza de Armas of Asunción

=== Philippines ===
- Plaza de Armas (Manila)

=== Spain ===
- Plaza de Armas (bus station), in Seville

=== United States ===
- Military Plaza, in San Antonio, Texas
- Plaza de Armas, San Juan, in Puerto Rico

== See also ==
- Plaza Mayor (disambiguation), synonym
- Place-d'Armes (disambiguation), French equivalent
