= Place-d'Armes =

Place d'Armes may refer to:

- Place d'Armes (Luxembourg), a square in Luxembourg City, Luxembourg
- Place-d'Armes, Versailles, France
- Place d'Armes, in Montreal, Canada, an urban square
  - Place-d'Armes (Montreal Metro), a transit station
  - Le 500 Place D'Armes, a building in Montreal
- Place d'Armes (Quebec City), the central square of the old city
- Place d'Armes, the French name of Jackson Square in New Orleans, Louisiana, U.S.A.
- Place d'Armes, the French name of Plaza de Armas in Old San Juan, Puerto Rico
- Place d'Armes, a novel by Scott Symons
- Place-of-arms, an assembly area for troops within a fortification

== See also ==
- Plaza Mayor and Plaza de Armas, Spanish equivalents
