= Plaza de Armas (Manila) =

Public square in Intramuros, Manila, Philippines

- Public square
- {{{other_names}}}
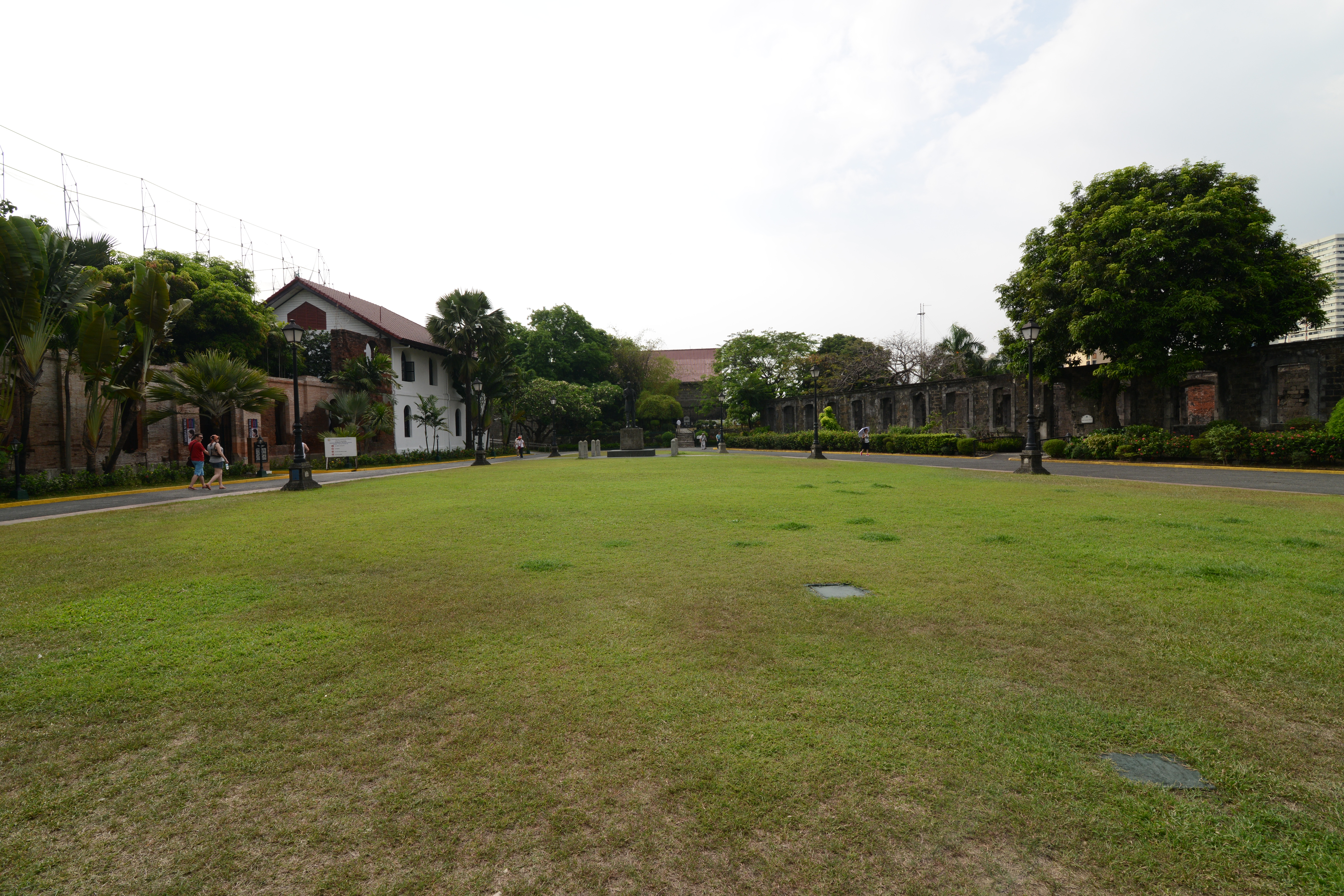
- The Plaza de Armas is the only green space in Fort Santiago, surrounded by plants and the fort's ruins
- Location: Fort Santiago, Intramuros; Manila, Philippines
- Interactive map of Plaza de Armas
- Coordinates: 14°35′40″N 120°58′12″E

The Plaza de Armas is a public square in Intramuros, Manila. It is the central plaza of Fort Santiago. It is one of three major plazas in Intramuros, the others being the central Plaza de Roma (also called "Plaza de Armas" at one point in its history) outside the fort grounds and Plaza Moriones (not to be confused with Plaza Moriones in Tondo), a larger plaza outside Fort Santiago which was once a military promenade before it was closed in the 1863 earthquake that devastated Manila. While Plaza Moriones is outside the walls of Fort Santiago, both plazas are often misconstrued for the other.

Historical evidence may suggest that the plaza is the site where the wooden palisade of Rajah Sulayman, on top of which Fort Santiago was built, was located and deliberately allocated by Miguel López de Legazpi as the smaller of two open squares in Intramuros, the other being the larger Plaza Mayor (today's Plaza de Roma). Military barracks and storehouses surrounded the plaza, of which only its ruins stand today.

Currently, the plaza is an open green area surrounded by trees. On the western side of the plaza is the Rizal Shrine, erected in honour of José Rizal, who was imprisoned there before his execution in 1896, when the building was still being used as military barracks. The Shrine includes a statue of Rizal erected at the center of the plaza. To the north is a cross erected in memory of World War II victims who were buried in a mass grave underneath by the Imperial Japanese Army. On the eastern side is an eighteenth-century building subsequently converted into the Dulaang Raha Sulayman (Rajah Sulayman Theater), the venue of seasonal performances by the Philippine Educational Theater Association (PETA).

== See also ==
- Plaza de Armas
