= Plaza Mayor =

Plaza Mayor may refer to:

- Plaza mayor (urban design), in Spanish-speaking countries, a major city square
  - Plaza Mayor, Almagro, a plaza in the centre of Almagro, Spain
  - Plaza Mayor, Madrid, a plaza in the centre of Madrid, Spain
  - Plaza Mayor, Salamanca, a plaza in the centre of Salamanca, Spain
  - Plaza Mayor, Segovia, a plaza in the centre of Segovia, Spain
  - Plaza Mayor, Valladolid, a plaza in the centre of Valladolid, Spain
  - Plaza Mayor, Lima, a plaza in the centre of Lima, Peru
  - Plaza Mayor, Manila, a plaza in the centre of Manila, Philippines
  - Plaza Mayor, Medellín, a conventions center in Medellín, Colombia
  - Plaza Mayor, Trinidad, a plaza in the center of Trinidad, Cuba
- Plaza Mayor (shopping center) in León, Guanajuato state, Mexico
- Plaza Mayor (Oklahoma), formerly Crossroads Mall, a mall in Oklahoma City, United States

== See also ==
- Plaza de Armas, synonym
