= San Juan City Hall =

Administrative seat of the Mayor of San Juan, Puerto Rico

Coordinates: 18°27′56″N 66°7′0″W

- Casa de la Alcaldía de San Juan
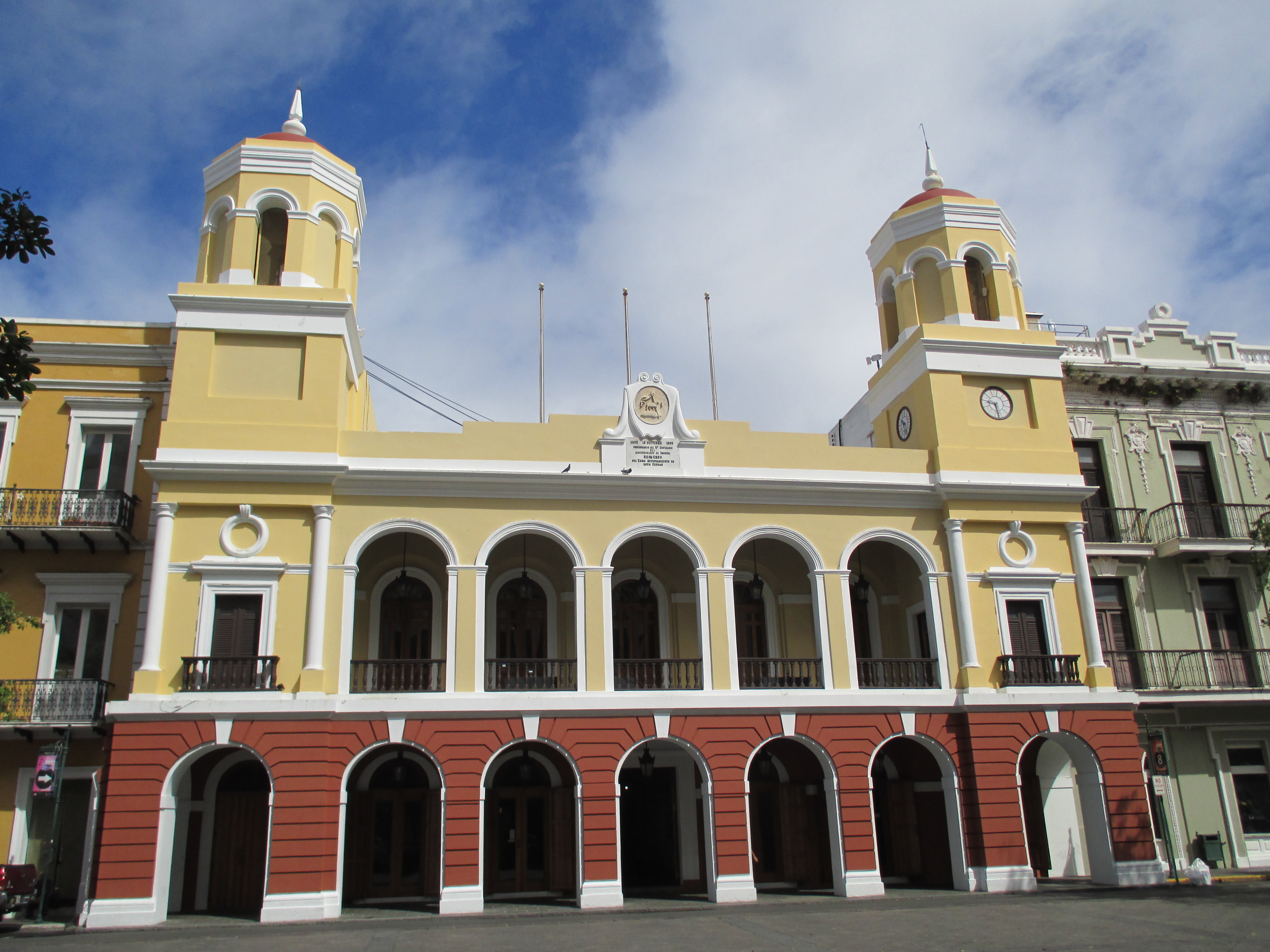
- San Juan City Hall (2015)
- Interactive map of the San Juan City Hall area

General information
- Architectural style: Neoclassic Spanish Colonial
- Location: 153 San Francisco Street, Old San Juan, San Juan, Puerto Rico
- Groundbreaking: 1604
- Construction started: 18th century
- Completed: 1842

Design and construction
- Architect: Pedro García
- San Juan City Hall
- U.S. Historic district – Contributing property
- U.S. National Historic Landmark District – Contributing property
- Part of: Old San Juan Historic District (ID72001553 & ID13000284)

Significant dates
- Designated CP: October 10, 1972
- Designated NHLDCP: February 27, 2013

San Juan City Hall (Spanish: Casa de la Alcaldía de San Juan, or Alcaldía de San Juan) is the seat of government for the Autonomous Municipality of San Juan in Puerto Rico. The city hall is located in Old San Juan, in front of the Plaza de Armas and next to the Antiguo Palacio de la Real Intendencia (Palace of the Royal Intendancy), which today hosts the Puerto Rico Department of State.

The San Juan City Hall was built in stages from 1604 to 1789. It went through numerous additions and expansions throughout its history. Its current structure and façade by the square, inspired by the Casa de la Panadería in the Plaza Mayor of Madrid, completed in 1840 and was designed by architect Pedro García.

== Features ==
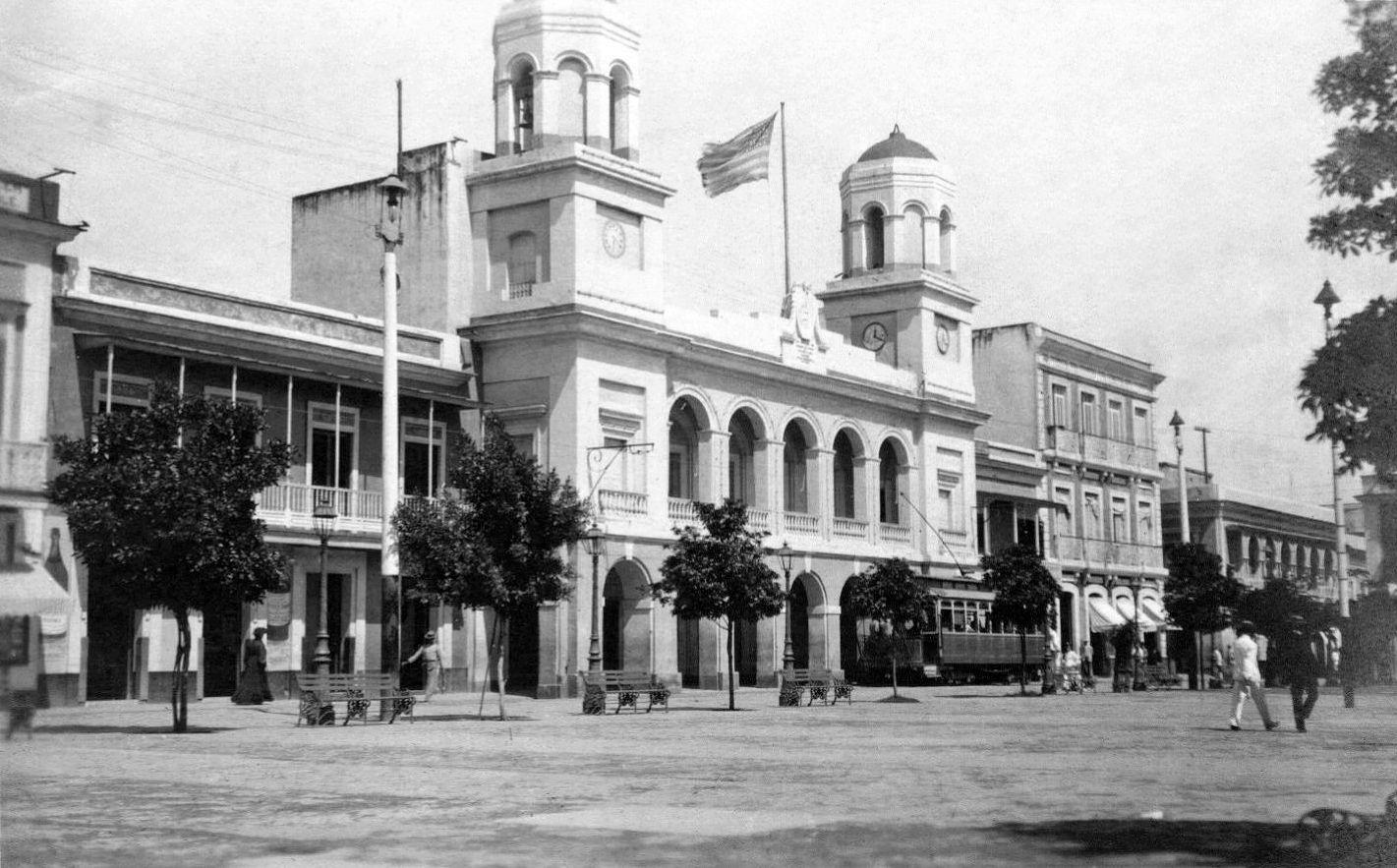
San Juan City Hall (1906)

The city hall building has a large staircase and an inner courtyard which is open to visitors. The Plaza de Armas main entrance has an inscription in Latin which translates to "Esteem the light of justice whoever is at the service of their people". The first floor of the main building hosts tourism offices while the second floor houses the office of the Mayor of San Juan and the seat of municipal government.

One of its most famous rooms is the Sala Capitular (Spanish for chapter hall), a meeting hall that has hosted numerous historical events, such as the proclamation of Admiral Ramón Power y Giralt as the first representative for Puerto Rico at the Cortes de Cádiz in Spain in 1812 and the signing of the abolition of slavery in Puerto Rico in 1873. The city hall also hosts the San Juan Bautista Gallery, which often showcases works of art made by local artists.

== Gallery ==
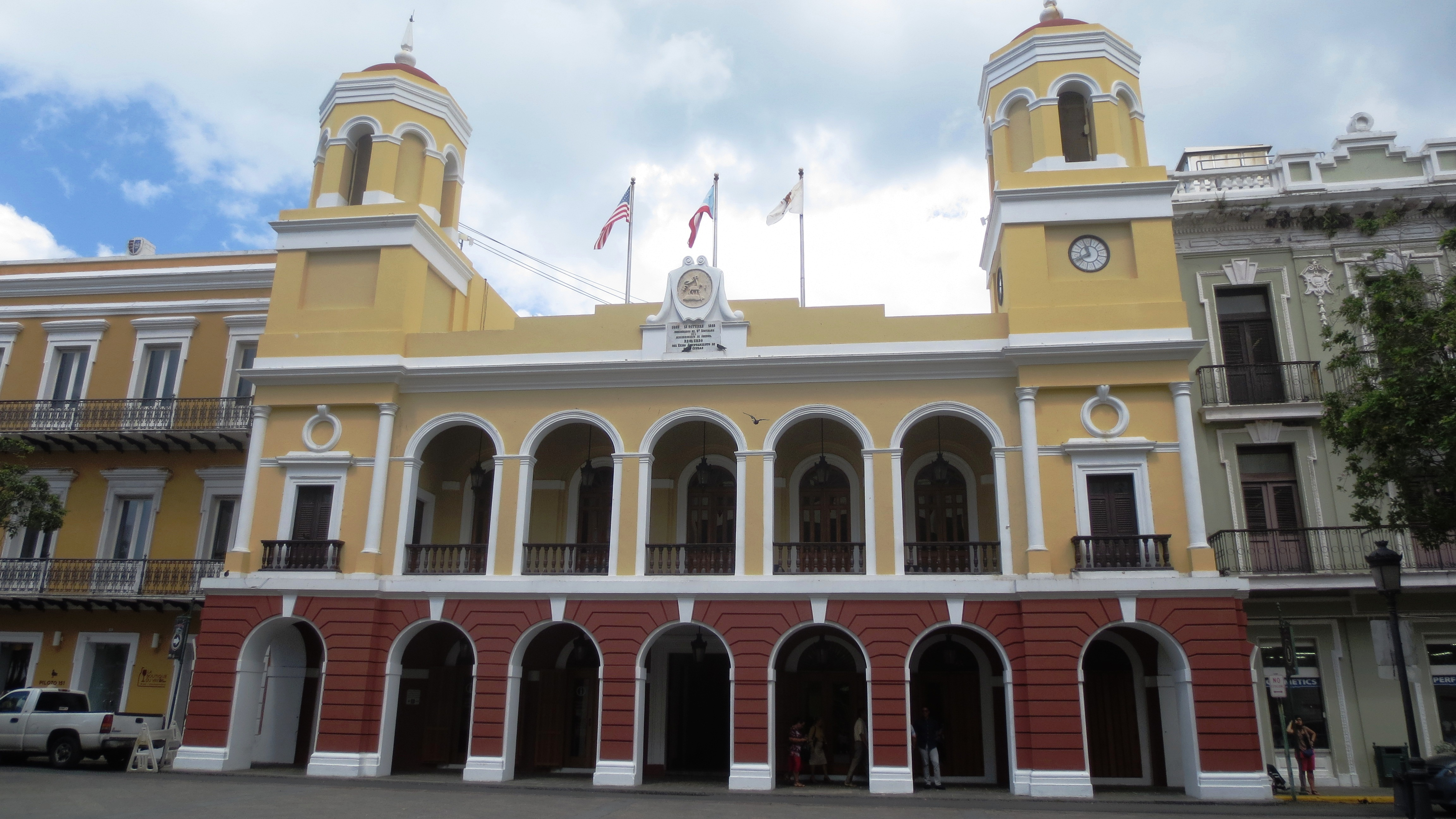
Front of the San Juan City Hall by the Plaza de Armas.

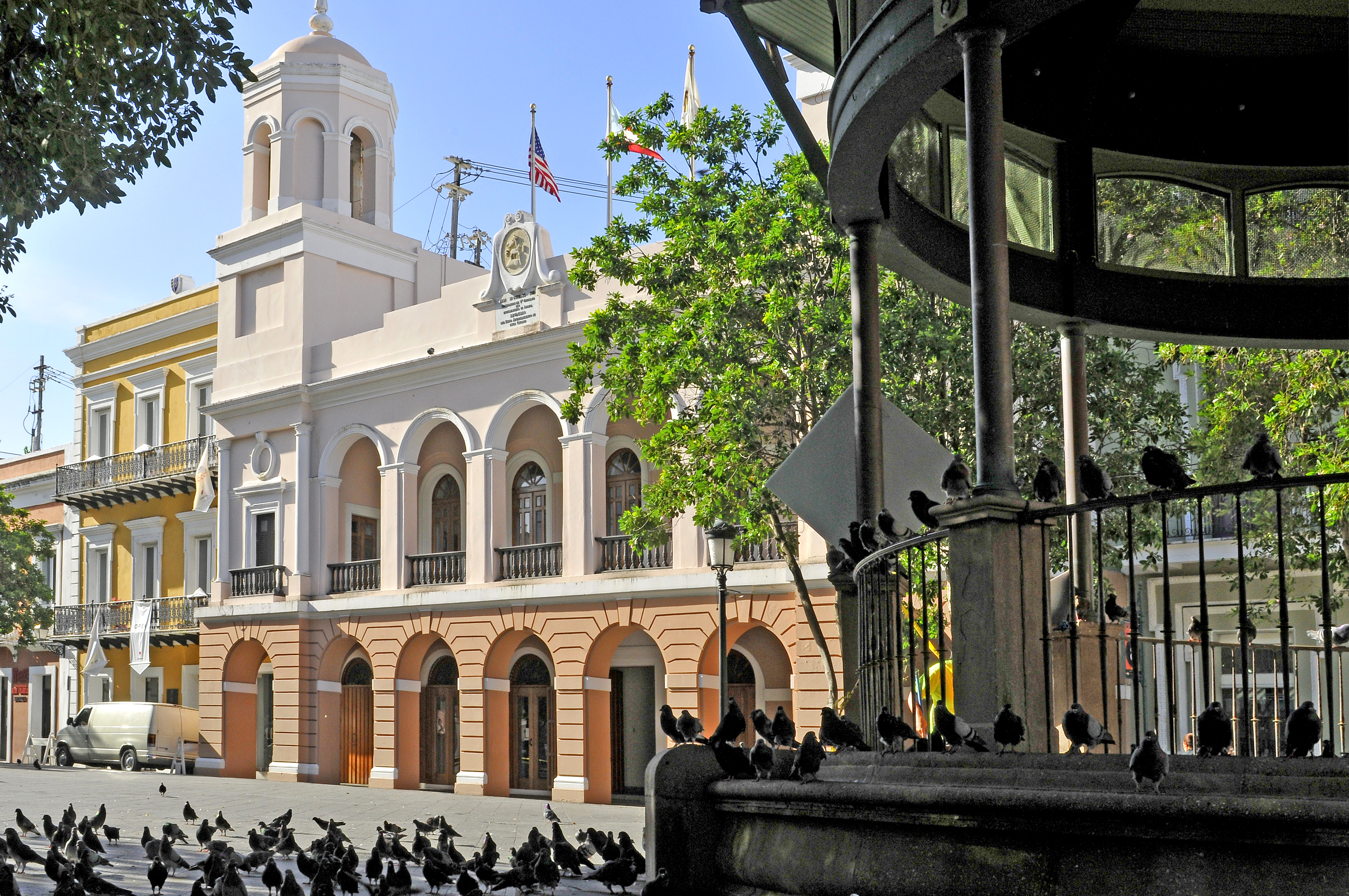
City hall from the Plaza de Armas gazebo.

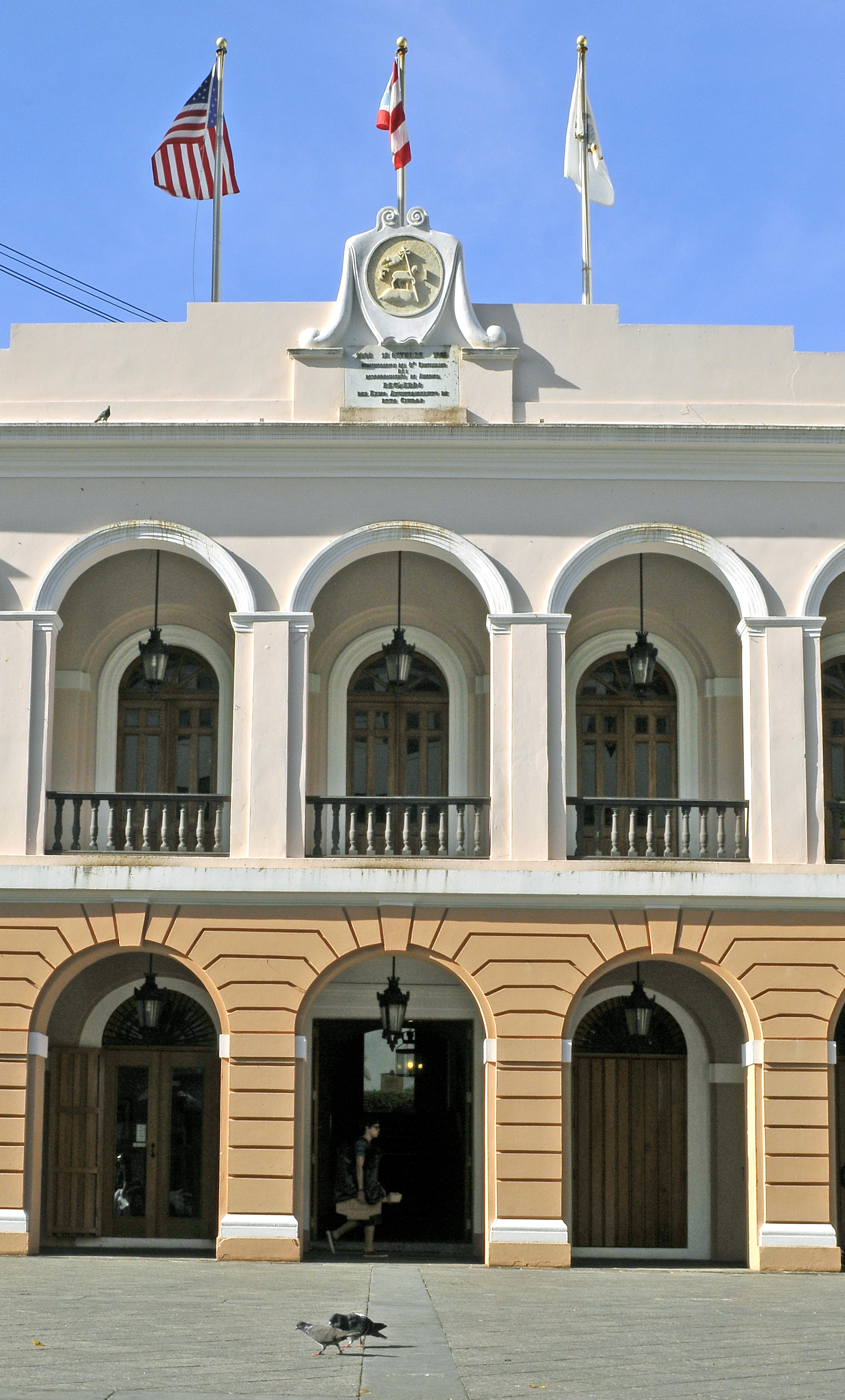
Close up of the front entrance.

== See also ==
- List of mayors of San Juan, Puerto Rico
