= Rizal Shrine (Intramuros) =

- Museo ni José Rizal Fort Santiago (Filipino)
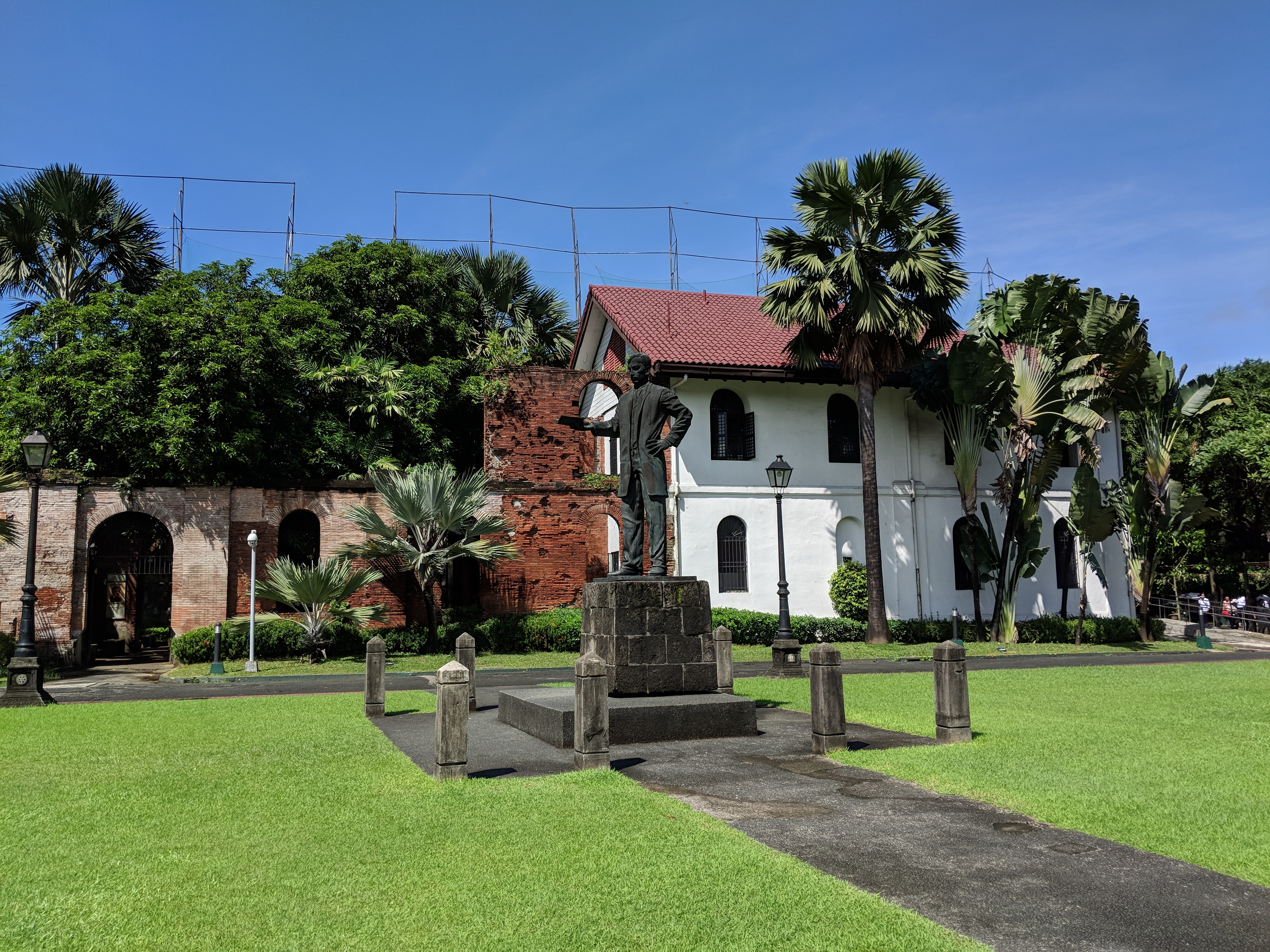
- Interactive map of the Rizal Shrine area

General information
- Status: Active
- Type: Museum
- Location: Plaza de Armas, Fort Santiago, Intramuros, 1002 Manila, Philippines
- Coordinates: 14°35′40″N 120°58′11″E
- Construction started: 1953

Technical details
- Floor count: 3

Design and construction
- Architect: Ramon Faustmann

The Rizal Shrine, also known as the Museo ni José Rizal Fort Santiago (transl. Museum of Jose Rizal in Fort Santiago), is a museum dedicated to the lifework of José Rizal. It is located inside Fort Santiago in Intramuros, Manila, Philippines, beside the Plaza de Armas. Fort Santiago served as barracks for Spanish artillery soldiers during Spain's colonization of the islands. The museum is located in the building where Rizal spent his final night and hid his famous poem Mi último adiós (My Last Farewell) in an oil lamp later given to his sister, Trinidad. The shrine is home to various memorabilia such as the shells he collected in Dapitan, books, manuscripts and artwork.

In 2014, the National Historical Commission of the Philippines renovated the museum in order to attract younger audience.

== See also ==
- National Historical Commission of the Philippines
- Rizal Park
- Rizal Shrine (Calamba)
