= Plaza de Armas (Havana) =

Square in Havana, Cuba

- Public square
- {{{other_names}}}
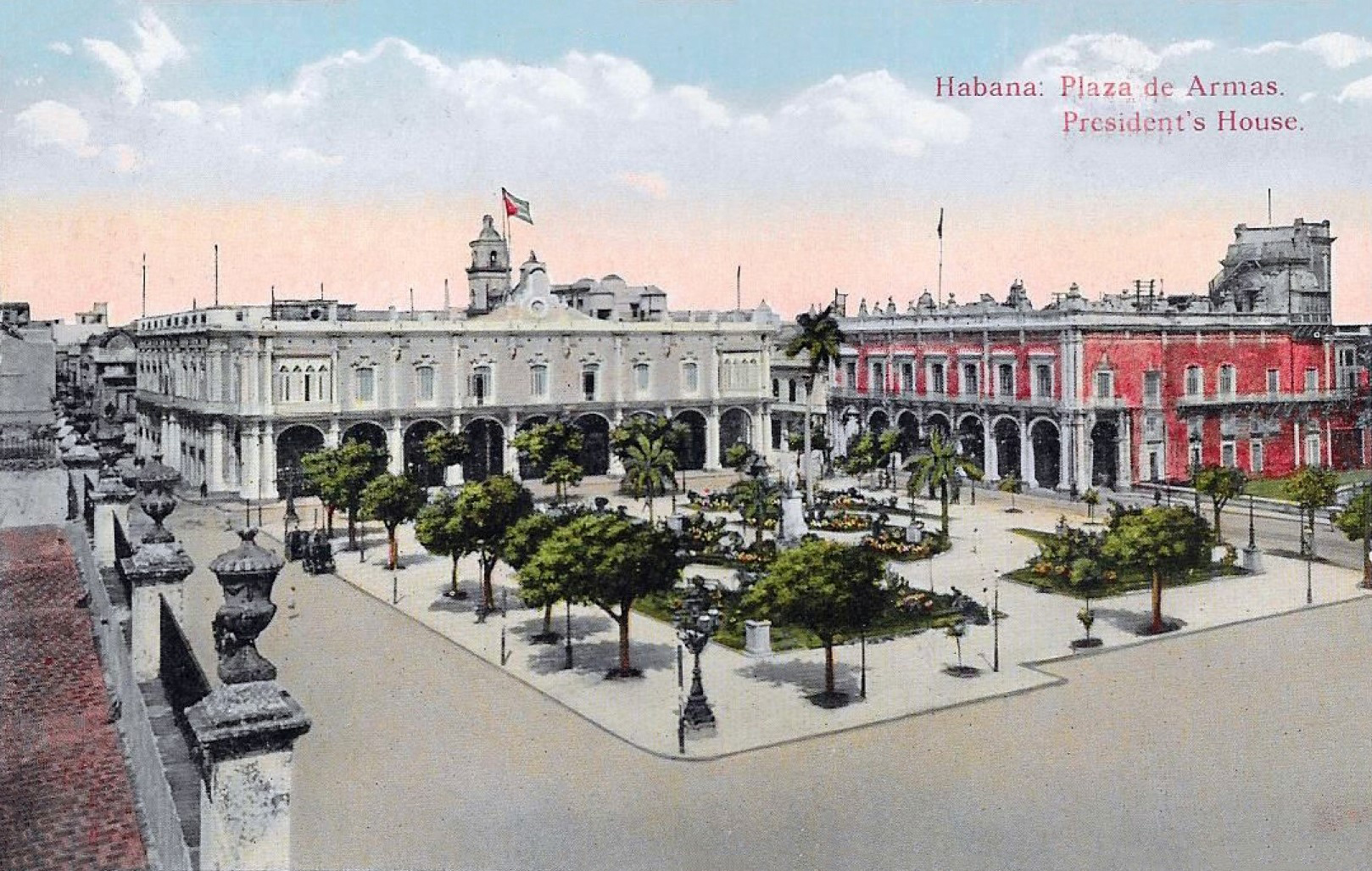
- Opened: 1520s
- Location: La Habana Vieja, Havana, La Habana Province, Cuba
- Location of the Plaza de Armas in Havana
- Coordinates: 23°8′24″N 82°20′57″W

Plaza de Armas is the oldest town square in Habana Vieja.

== Early history ==
Established in the early 1520s in Habana Vieja, the Plaza de las Armas was designed to serve as the original main square for the military and government in Havana. As Spanish custom when they laid out a new town, open space was reserved for a public square when the city was founded in 1519. The Plaza de Armas was commandeered for military use by the 1580s. The name was La Plaza de Armas, translating to "Place of Arms".

In 1777, a church was demolished to make way for the new residence of the governor-general. The Governor's Palace was situated on Plaza de Armas and occupied one whole side of the square. In 1896, the square was described as consisting of four parks with Ceiba trees and a marble statue of Ferdinand VII in the center. Ramón Blanco was the last Spanish captain-general to occupy the site, and after 1899, it became the executive seat of the Cuban government.

The square in Old Havana was surrounded by historic buildings including Castillo de la Real Fuerza, El Templete, the Federal Supreme Court, and the Senate building.

== See also ==
- Plaza de Armas
