= Plaza Moriones, Intramuros =

Public square in Intramuros, Manila, Philippines

Plaza Moriones
- Public square
- {{{other_names}}}
- Former name: Plaza de la Fuerza
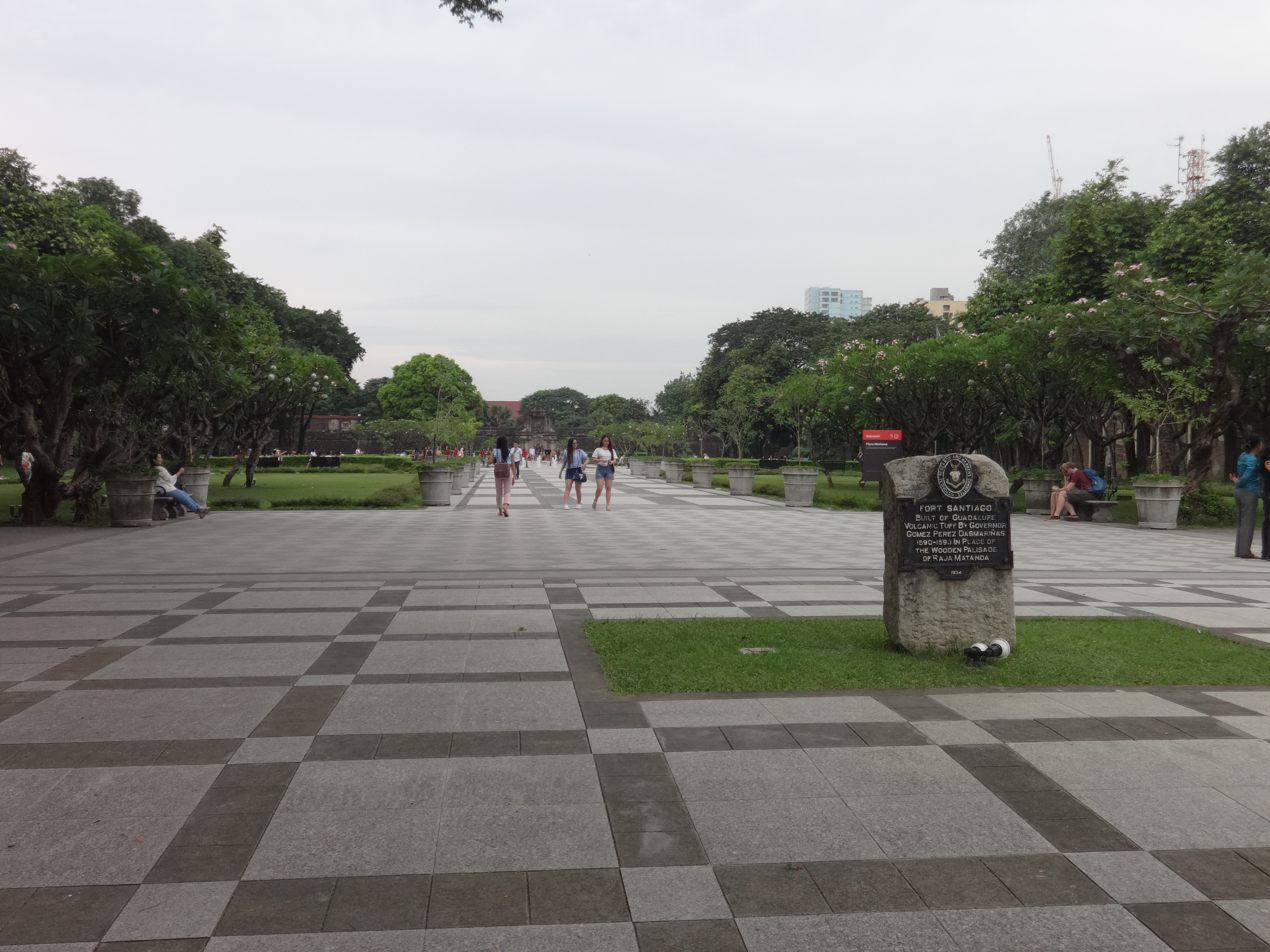
- Dedicated to: Domingo Moriones y Muralla
- Owner: City of Manila
- Location: Fort Santiago, Intramuros; Manila, Philippines
- Interactive map of Plaza Moriones
- Coordinates: 14°35′35.9″N 120°58′16.5″E

Plaza Moriones is a public square in Intramuros, Manila. Located in front of the entrance to Fort Santiago, it is one of three major plazas in Intramuros, the others being Plaza de Roma located beyond the fort's grounds, and the Plaza de Armas located inside the fort, to which it is often misconstrued for.

== History ==
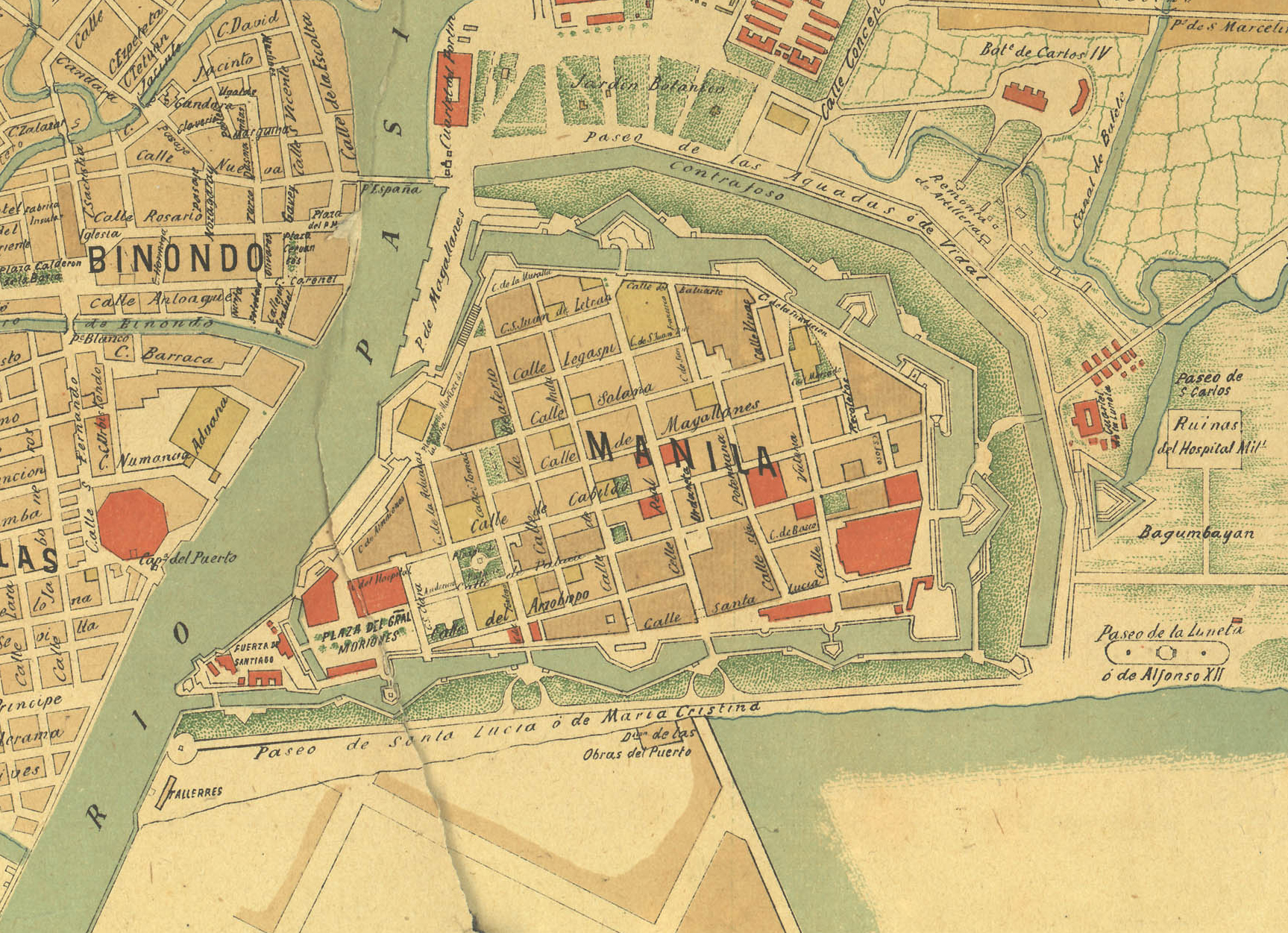
This 1898 map of Manila was the first to call Plaza Moriones that name.

Attested in maps of Manila dating back to at least 1671, Plaza Moriones was originally known as the Plaza de la Fuerza, an empty lot which served as a military promenade for soldiers barracked inside Fort Santiago. It served in this role before the fort was damaged in the 1863 earthquake that devastated Manila, after which it was converted into temporary military barracks. By 1875, the plaza was once again empty, and as early as 1898, the plaza was already called the Plaza del General Moriones, after Domingo Moriones y Muralla, who served as Governor General from 1877 to 1881.

During the American colonial period, the plaza retained its function as a parade ground for soldiers, but in the 1930s, according to a manuscript written by H. Otley Beyer, the United States Army — which was headquartered inside Fort Santiago at the time — took over the plaza and built soldiers’ quarters there.

With Intramuros virtually destroyed in the Battle of Manila during World War II, Plaza Moriones reverted to open space, even serving as a parking lot for cars and tour buses for years after the war. The reconstruction of Intramuros eventually prompted its redevelopment, planned as early as 1973, and completed twice by the Intramuros Administration: first in 1993, and again in 2017.

== Architecture ==
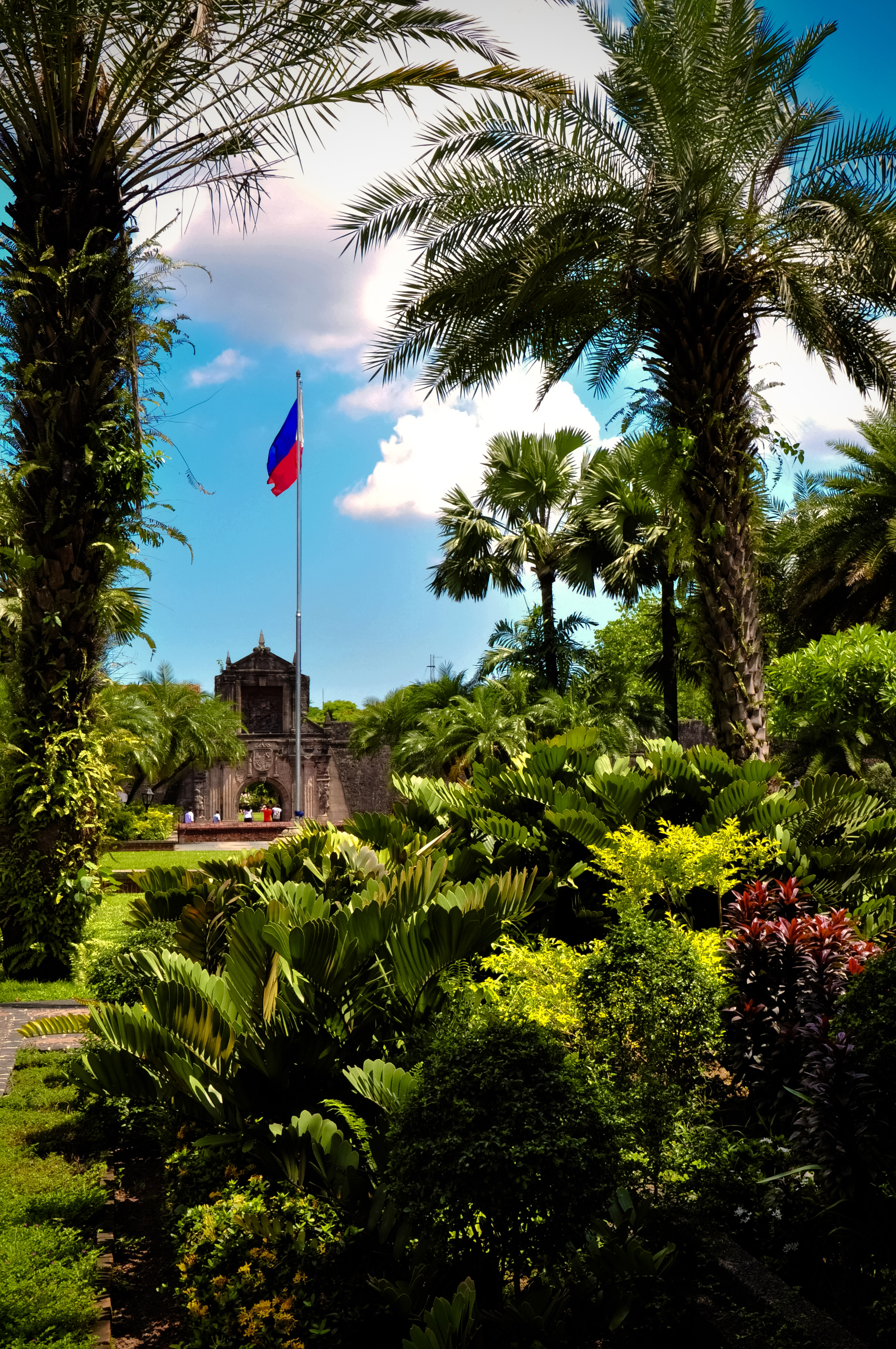
The former gardens of Plaza Moriones, taken in 2011.

Plaza Moriones was originally bare open space, with the plaza being documented as having grass as early as 1875. By 1903, despite still being considered an "unremarkable" space, the plaza had a few trees growing around its periphery, and by the 1930s, aerial photos show that trees were found growing on the northern side of the plaza, close to the fort's entrance, while the southern side remained open space. After World War II, the plaza reverted to being largely covered in grass, although shrubbery was planted in 1983. Concrete paths and a fountain were also installed in the 1980s.

Plans to redevelop the plaza were first conceptualized in 1973 as part of the Development Plan for Intramuros presented by the Spanish government, in which the plaza was envisioned as a “cultural-recreational area". In the early 1990s, the Intramuros Administration commissioned landscape architect Dolly Perez to redesign the plaza. Perez's redesign, completed in 1993, transformed the space into a garden with flora typical of 19th-century gardens. As part of the redesign, trees were planted and, in keeping with the general historical appearance of Intramuros, the plaza's walkways and low walls were framed in natural adobe and brick. This remained the general appearance of Plaza Moriones for nearly 25 years, making it a popular location for picnics, wedding receptions and dog walking.

=== 2017 redevelopment ===
In 2014, the Intramuros Administration proceeded with a second redevelopment of Plaza Moriones, part of a ₱240 million, ten-part redevelopment of Fort Santiago as a whole, and falling in line with its long-term plan for the wider redevelopment of Intramuros. The redeveloped Plaza Moriones was reopened by the Department of Tourism (DOT) on April 17, 2017, and funded by the Tourism Infrastructure and Enterprise Zone Authority (TIEZA), an attached agency of the DOT.

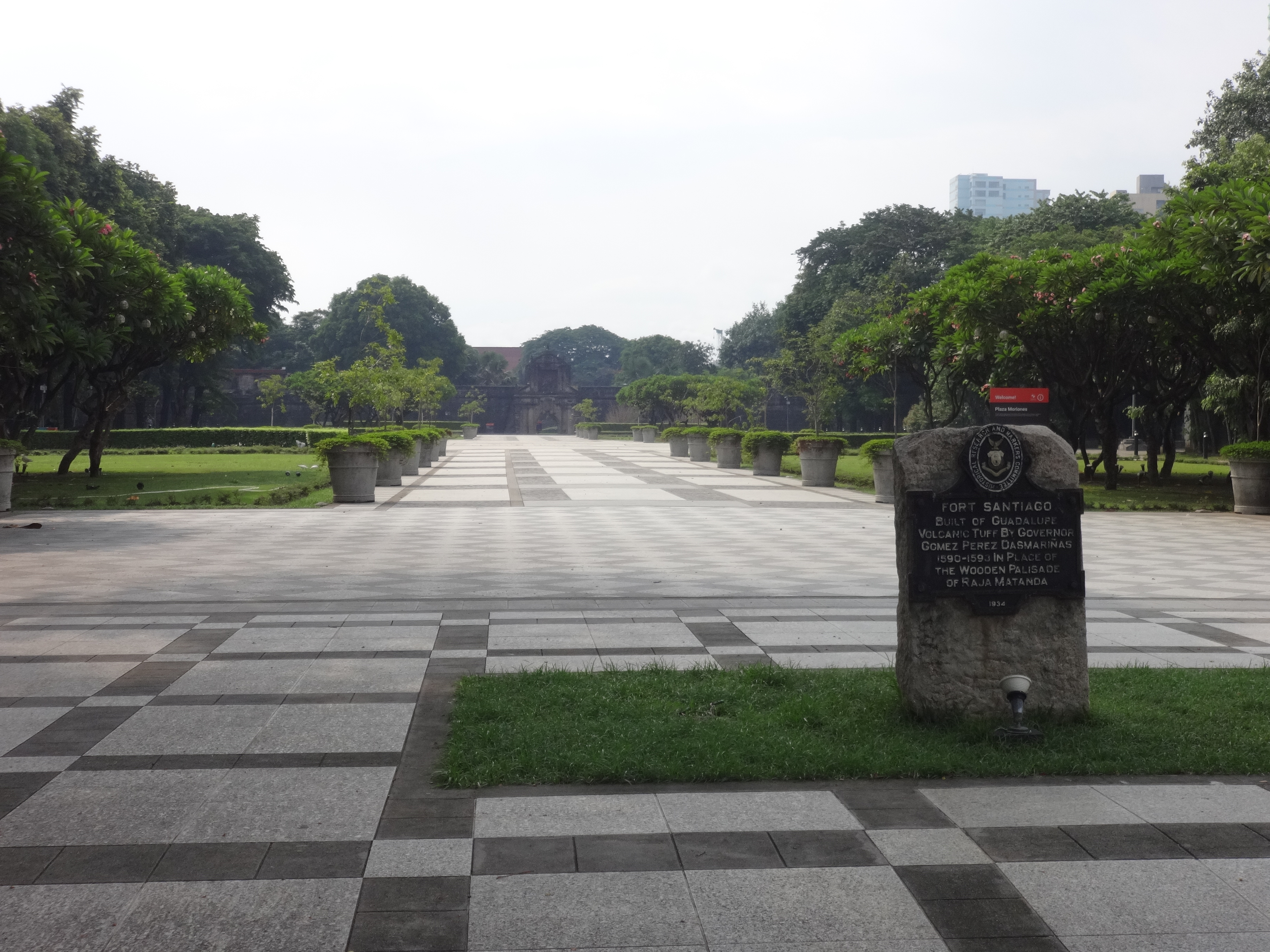
Plaza Moriones in 2020 during COVID-19 quarantine.

As part of the plaza's redevelopment, intended to restore the plaza to its original function as a parade ground, the gardens were replaced with granite paving, with specified areas for manicured planting arrangements within the plaza's periphery, including a number of kalachuchi (frangipani) trees festooned with capiz shell lamps near the entrance to Fort Santiago. This allows for unobstructed views of the fort's gate from Santa Clara Street, which bounds the plaza's southern end, as well as the Manila Cathedral from the plaza's northern end. A new fountain was also installed in the center of the plaza.

The redevelopment was controversial, eliciting criticism from tour guide and cultural activist Carlos Celdran, who complained that the IA "paved over my heart" after discovering the renovations as he was returning from a trip abroad. Celdran later remarked that the renovations looked "flat, anonymous, and [it] has nothing to do with Intramuros' character or history", even calling it the "plaza from TriNoma" and denouncing the project as a waste of taxpayers' money. The IA didn't conduct public consultations on the redevelopment project, as it was not required by law to do so, but people who use the plaza regularly have, according to architect Augusto F. Villalon, lamented the loss of its park-like atmosphere, especially considering Manila's lack of green, open spaces. In its defense, the IA emphasized that it consulted landscape architects and heritage experts when the project was first conceived in 2014, and Celdran himself has noted that he was nevertheless coordinating closely with stakeholders on the matter.

== See also ==
- Fort Santiago
- List of parks in Manila
- List of city squares
