= Plaza Mayor, Segovia =

Town square in Segrovia, Spain

Coordinates: 40°57′01″N 4°07′26″W

The Church of San Miguel in Plaza Mayor during the afternoon

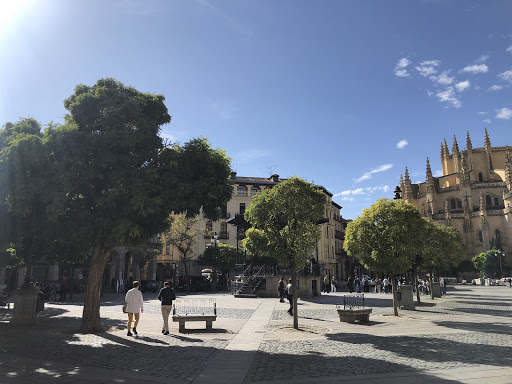
Plaza Mayor during the day

Plaza Mayor is a town square in Segovia, Spain, located at the end of the street called Calle Real, which is one of the most famous streets in Segovia. Within Plaza Mayor, you can find several important buildings, such as the town hall, the Juan Bravo Theatre, the San Miguel Church, and the cathedral.

== History ==
Centuries before the plaza was built in the 17th century, the space was treated as the center of the village, where vendors would install their stands and citizens would socialize and meet. It is said that in the middle ages, the street was known as Calle de la Cinteria, which means Ribbon Street because of the sector's shops and all its vendors. The town hall was built in the 17th century and ever since has been the building where the majority of Segovian events take place. Then towards the left of the town hall, there is the Cathedral known as Santa Maria de la Asuncion and San Frutos that was built between 1525 and 1577. The Church of San Miguel collapsed in the year 1532 but was then rebuilt in the same current place.

As the core of Segovia, the plaza was the center of political activity, where the council of the city would meet in the atrium of San Miguel. It was also the center for economical activity, especially because of the market granted by Enrique IV that up to today still continues to take place every Thursday. It is said that Plaza Mayor is considered to be a religious area due to the holidays that are celebrated within it and because it is located closest to the Cathedral.

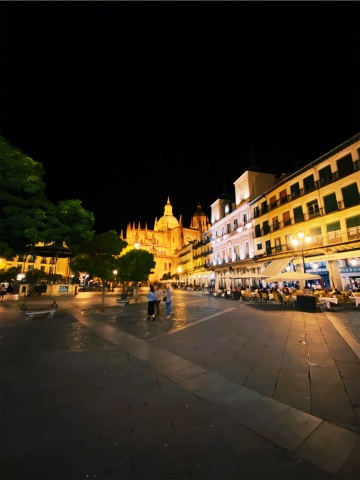
The kiosk located in the middle of Plaza Mayor in the evening.

One of the main buildings in the plaza, Juan Bravo Theater, was built in 1917 and is still in use today for both locals and tourists.

At the end of the 19th century, the plaza was filled with coffee shops, hotels, and boutique stores, leading to a higher rate of tourism for Segovia.

Lastly, the name of the plaza has changed over the years. At first its name was Plaza Mayor and later during the Bourbon Restoration it was called Plaza de la Constitución. After the civil war, it was changed to Plaza de Franco, until it was once again changed to its original name, Plaza Mayor, at the end of Francisco Franco's dictatorship.

== Characteristics ==
Plaza Mayor is essentially shaped as a rectangle.

The cathedral known as Santa Maria de la Asunción and San Frutos was built using Gothic architecture. On the other hand, the Juan Bravo Theatre was built in a way that it rises on a granite archway. There is also a small kiosk located in the middle of the plaza where people tend to play music and have social gatherings for Segovian festivities.

== Segovian festivals ==
Plaza Mayor is the center for many Spanish holidays, especially Segovian ones. For example, fiestas Frutos de Segovia, which is celebrated with Segovian artists such as the painter Amadeo Olmos who in 2019 was in charge of the illustration that expressed the desire of the hermit on a sheet: ‘We are all in the same tree’, representing San Frutos next to a bird.

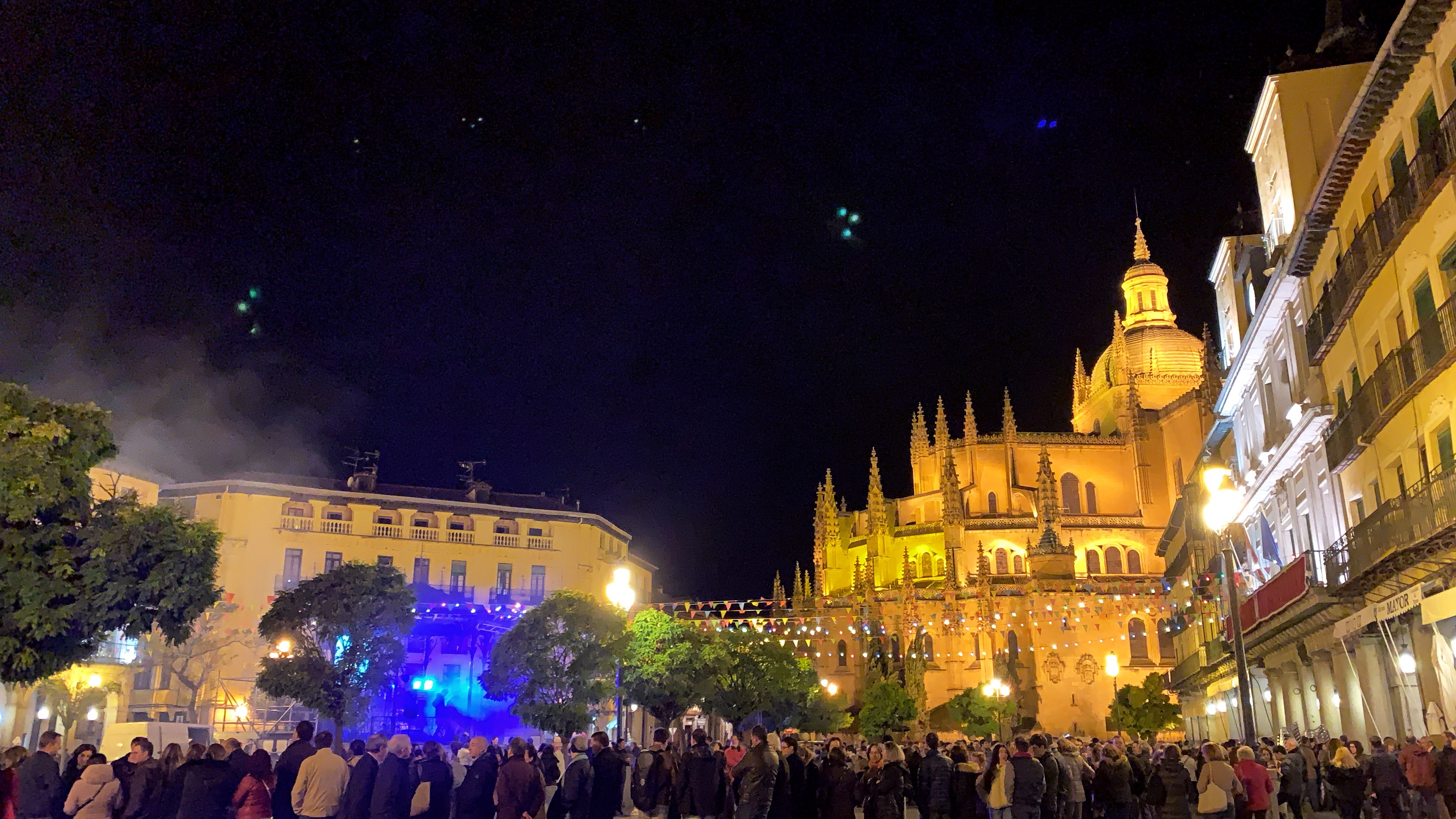
Plaza Mayor during Segovian Festival San Frutos October 25, 2019.

The plaza has been the center of the city for a long time, a meeting place for parties and public rejoicing. In the Plaza Mayor the traditional fairs of San Juan are held until the day of San Pedro, June 29. During these traditional fairs, folk walks, illuminations, and fireworks take place.
