= Fort Santiago =

16th-century citadel in Manila, Philippines

- Moóg ng Santiago
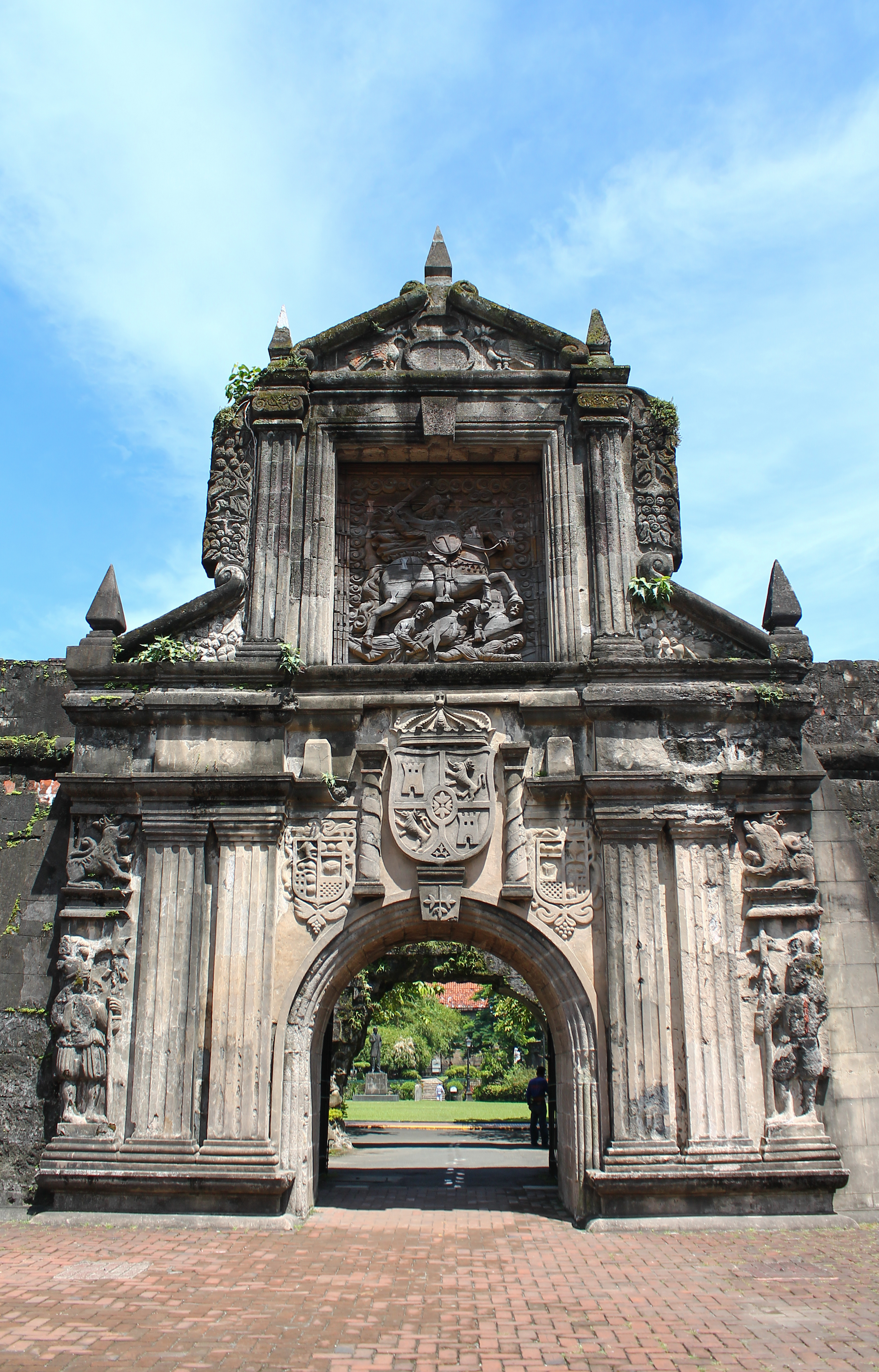
- The reconstructed main gate of Fort Santiago

- Location within Metro Manila Location within Luzon Location within Philippines

General information
- Type: Bastioned fort
- Architectural style: Italian-Spanish school of fortification
- Location: along the Pasig River, Intramuros, Philippines
- Coordinates: 14°35′42″N 120°58′10″E
- Named for: Saint James the Great
- Construction started: 1571
- Completed: 1593
- Renovated: 1733

Dimensions
- Other dimensions: 2,030 feet (620 m) perimeter

Technical details
- Structural system: Masonry

Design and construction
- Architects: Gómez Pérez Dasmariñas (1590); Fernándo Valdés y Tamon (1730s)
- Structural engineer: Leonardo Iturriano
- Designations: National Historical Landmark

Website
- visitfortsantiago.com

Fort Santiago (Spanish: Fuerte de Santiago; Filipino: Moóg ng Santiago), built in 1571, is a citadel or castle built by Spanish navigator and governor Miguel López de Legazpi for the newly established city of Manila in the Philippines. The defense fortress is located in Intramuros, the walled city of Manila.

The fort is one of the most important historical sites in Manila. Several people died in its prisons during the Spanish Empire and World War II. José Rizal, the Philippine national hero, was imprisoned here before his execution in 1896. The Rizal Shrine museum displays memorabilia of the hero in their collection and the fort features, embedded onto the ground in bronze, his footsteps representing his final walk from his cell to the location of the actual execution.

It is near the Manila Cathedral and the Palacio del Gobernador (lit. Governor's Palace, currently the office of the Commission on Elections).

== Profile ==
Adornments of the gate

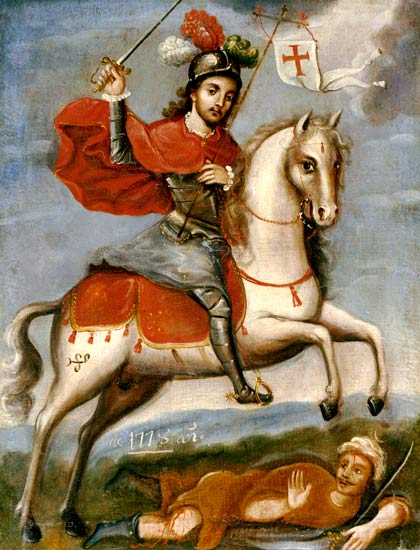
Image of Saint James (Santiago)

The lesser arms of the monarch of Spain

The fort was named after Saint James (Santiago in Spanish), the patron saint of Spain, who is also known as Saint James the Muslim-slayer because of the legend that he miraculously appeared hundreds of years after his death to fight in the battle of Clavijo, whose relief adorns the façade of the front gate. It is located at the mouth of the Pasig River and served as the premier defense fortress of the Spanish Government during their rule of the country. It became a main fort for the spice trade to the Americas and Europe for 333 years. The Manila Galleon trade to Acapulco, Mexico began from the Fuerte de Santiago.

The fort has a perimeter of 2,030 feet (620 m), and it is of a nearly triangular form. The south front, which looks toward the city, is a curtain with a terreplein, flanked by two demi-bastions - the Bastion of San Fernando, on the riverside, and the Bastion of San Miguel, by the bayside. A moat connected with the river separates the fort from the city. Near the beginning of the north face, instead of a bastion, a cavalier called Santa Barbara was built with three faces of batteries, one looking seaward over the anchorage place, one facing the entrance, and the third looking upon the river. The latter is united with a tower of the same height as the walls, through which there is a descent to the water battery placed upon a semicircular platform, thus completing the triangular form of the fort.

The 22-foot (6.7 m) high walls, with a thickness of 8 feet (2.4 m) are pierced for the necessary communications. The front gateway façade measures 40 feet (12 m) high being in the south wall and facing the city. The communication with the river and the sea was by an obscure postern gate - the Postigo de la Nuestra Señora del Soledad (Postern of Our Lady of Solitude). Inside the fort were guard stations, together with the barracks of the troops of the garrison and quarters of the warden and his subalterns. Also inside the fort were various storehouses, a chapel, the powder magazine, the sentry towers, the cisterns, etc.

== History ==
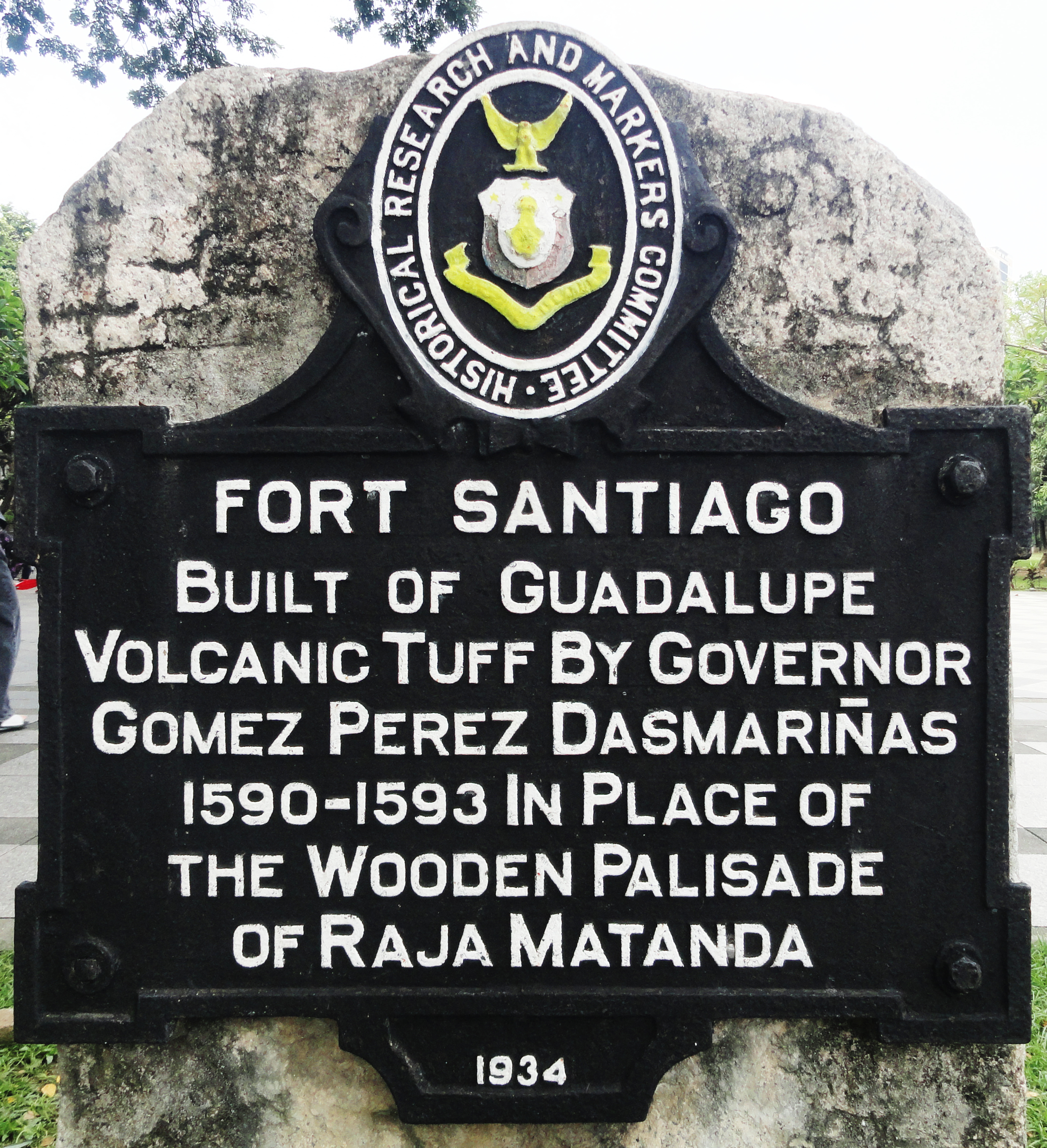
Fort HRMC historical marker

The location of Fort Santiago was once the site of a palisaded fort, armed with bronze guns, of Rajah Matanda, a Muslim Tagalog rajah of pre-Hispanic Manila who himself was a vassal to the Sultan of Brunei. The fort was destroyed by maestre de campo (master-of-camp) Martin de Goiti who, upon arriving in 1570 from Cebu, fought several battles with the Muslim natives. The Spaniards started building Fort Santiago (Fuerte de Santiago) after the establishment of the city of Manila under Spanish rule on June 24, 1571, and made Manila the capital of the newly colonized islands.

The first fort was a structure of palm logs and earth. Most of it was destroyed when the city was invaded by Chinese pirates led by Limahong. Martin de Goiti was killed during the siege. After a fierce conflict, the Spaniards under the leadership of Juan de Salcedo, eventually drove the pirates out to Pangasinan province to the north, and eventually out of the country.

The construction of Fort Santiago with hard stone, together with the original fortified walls of Intramuros, commenced in 1590 and finished in 1593 during the term of Governor-General Gómez Pérez Dasmariñas. The stones used were volcanic tuff quarried from Guadalupe (now Guadalupe Viejo in Makati). The fort as Dasmariñas left it consisted of a castellated structure without towers, trapezoidal in trace, its straight gray front projecting into the river mouth. Arches supported an open gun platform above, named the battery of Santa Barbara, the patron saint of all good artillerymen. These arches formed casemates which afforded a lower tier of fire through embrasures. Curtain walls of simplest character, without counter forts or interior buttresses, extended the flanks to a fourth front facing the city.

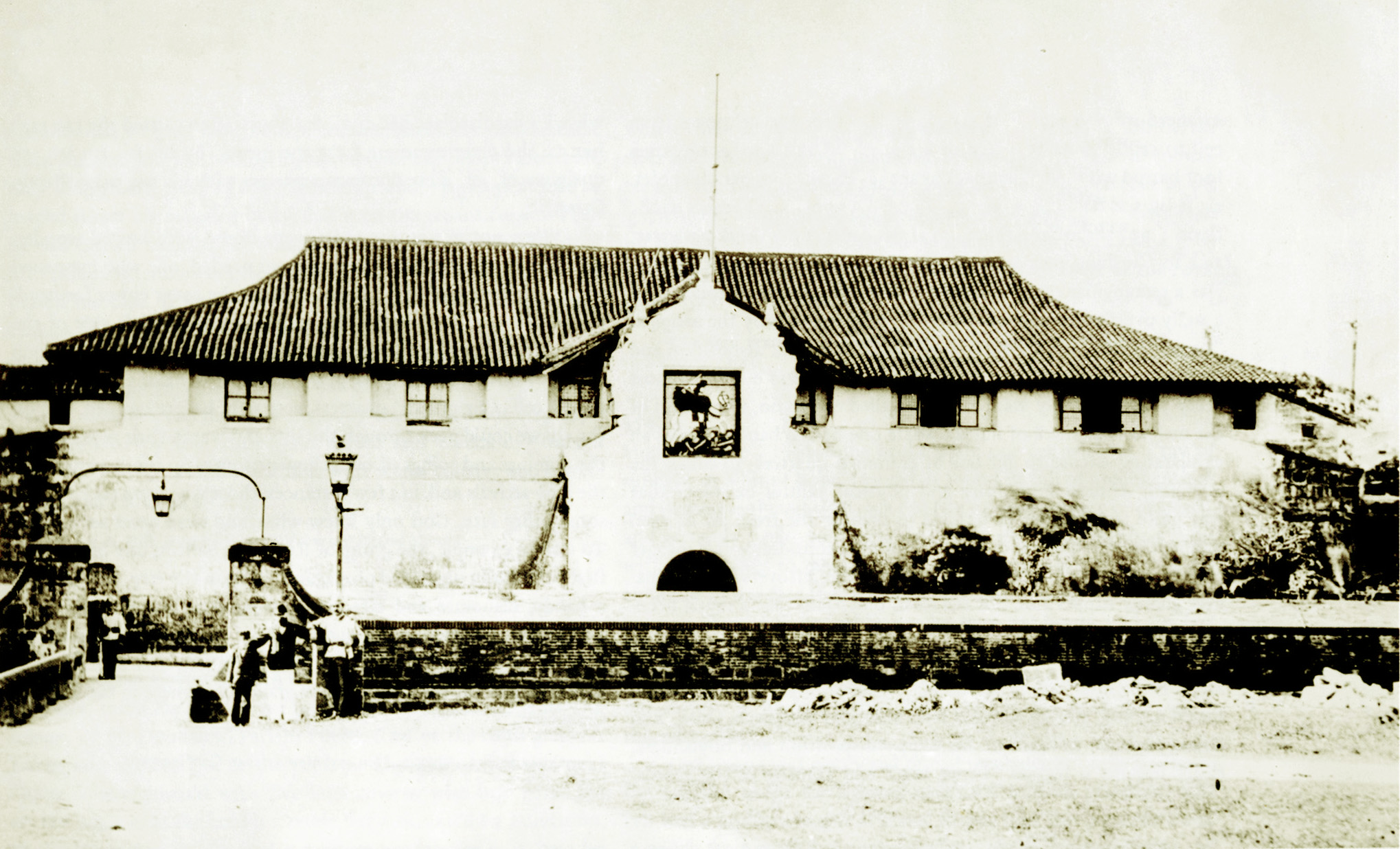
Side facade of Fort Santiago in 1880. The edifice was partially destroyed by the earthquake of July 1880.

In 1714, the ornate gate of Fort Santiago was erected together with some military barracks. The Luzon earthquakes of 1880, which destroyed much of the city of Manila, destroyed the front edifice of the fort changing its character. The years: 1636, 1654, 1670, and 1672; saw the deployment of 22, 50, 86, and 81 Latin-American soldiers from Mexico at Fort Santiago.

During the leadership of Fernándo Valdés y Tamon in the 1730s, a large semicircular gun platform to the front called media naranja (half orange) and another of lesser dimensions to the river flank were added to the Bastion of Santa Barbara. The casemates were then filled in and embrasures closed. He also changed the curtain wall facing cityward to a bastioned front. A lower parapet, bordering the interior moat, connects the two bastions.

=== British occupation ===
On September 24, 1762, British forces led by Brigadier-General William Draper and Rear-Admiral Samuel Cornish invaded and captured Manila, and along with it Fort Santiago. It was during this time that the fort served as a base of operations for the Royal Navy until April 1764 when they agreed to a ceasefire with the Spanish.

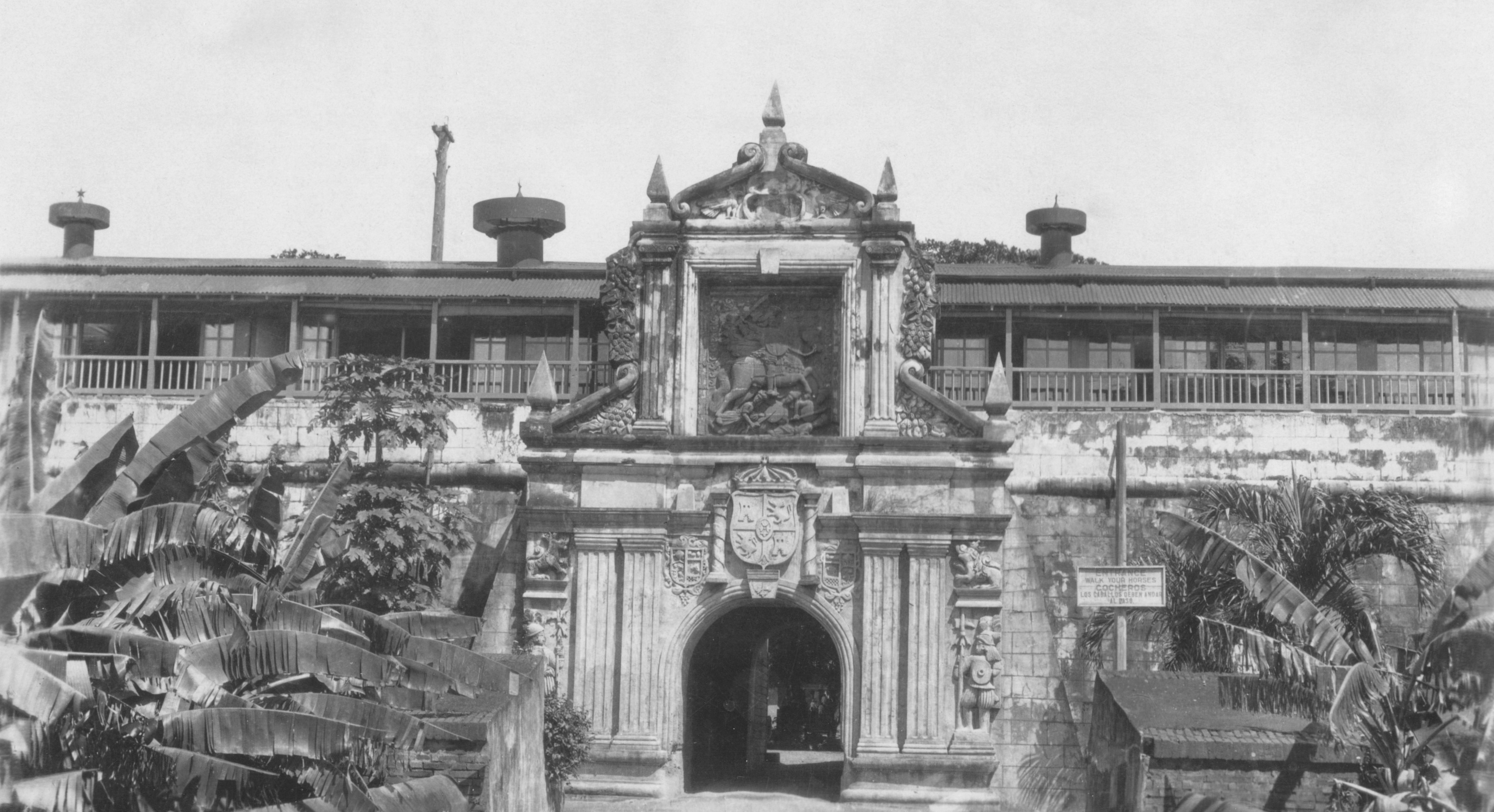
American-occupied Fort Santiago in 1940

=== American colonial period ===
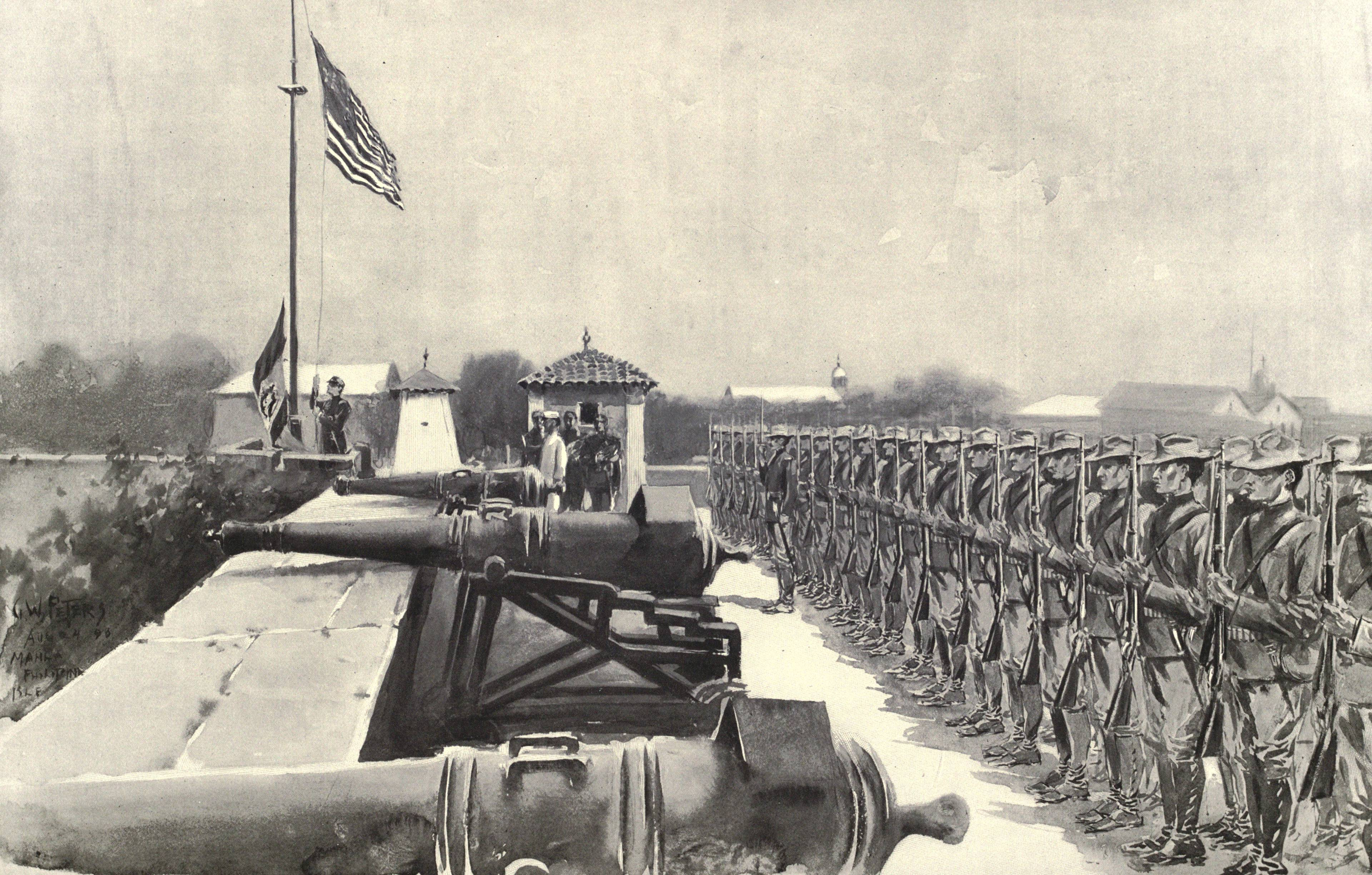
The raising of the American flag at Fort Santiago

On August 13, 1898, the American flag was raised in Fort Santiago signifying the start of the American rule in the Philippines. The fort served as the headquarters for the U.S. Army and several changes were made to the fort by the Americans. One of these changes included the draining of the moats surrounding the fort. The grounds were then transformed into a golf course.

=== World War II ===
During World War II, Fort Santiago was captured by the Japanese Imperial Army, and used its prisons and dungeons including the storage cells and gunpowder magazines for hundreds of prisoners who were killed near the end of the war (see Manila massacre). The fort sustained heavy damage from American and Filipino military mortar shells during the Battle of Manila in February 1945. Also, approximately 600 American prisoners of war died of suffocation or hunger after being held in extremely tight quarters in the dungeons at Fort Santiago.

== The fort today ==
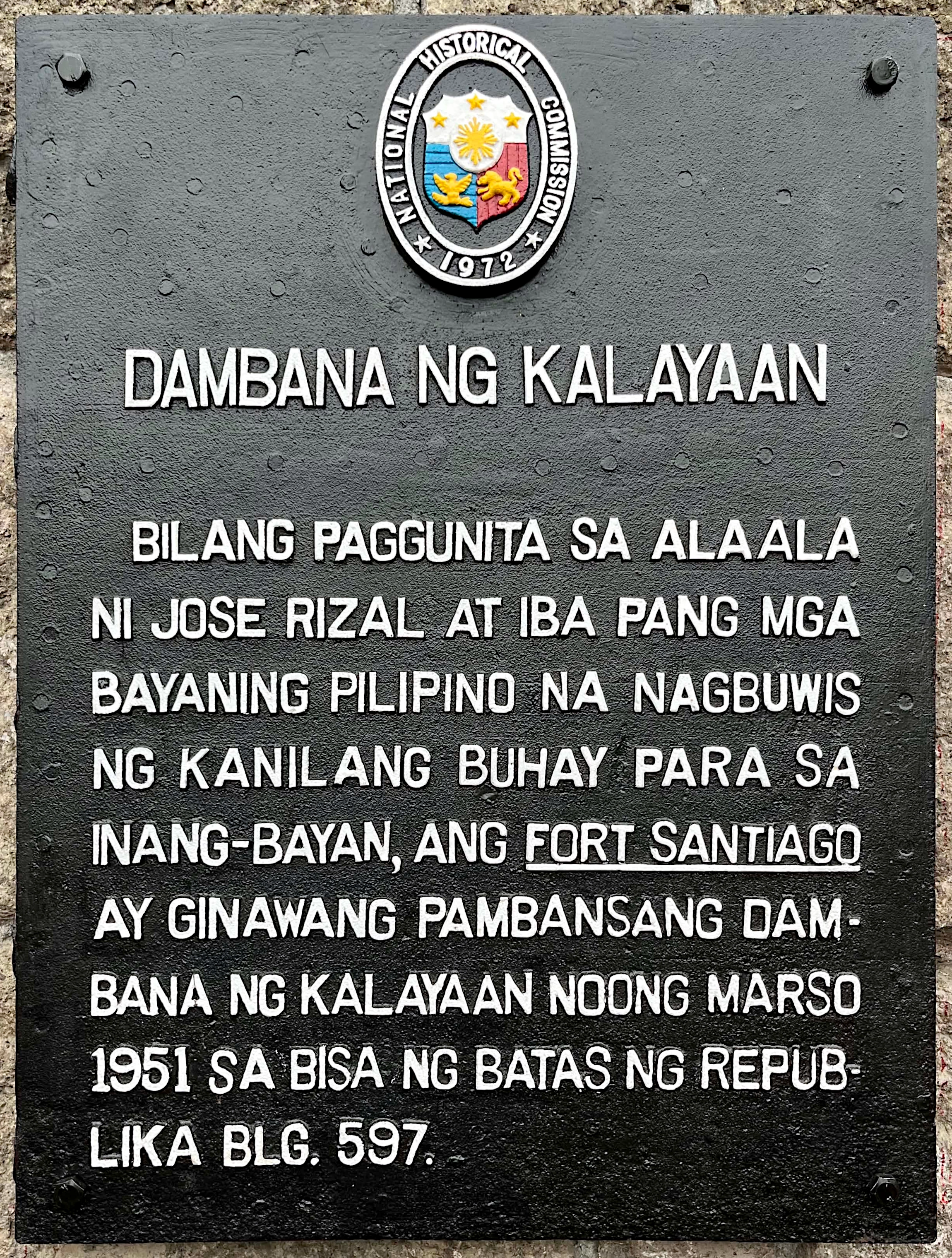
National historical marker created in 1972 stating that the fort was declared a National Shrine in March 1951

Today, the fort, its bastions, and the prison dungeons for criminals used by the Spanish officials, is now part of a historical park which also includes Plaza Moriones and several ruins. The park houses well-preserved legacies from the Spanish colonial period including memorabilia of José Rizal at the Rizal Shrine, a replica of his ancestral house in Laguna province.

Adaptive use of this famous historical landmark makes certain areas ideal for open air theater, picnics, and as a promenade. The Intramuros visitors center gives an overview of the various attractions in the walled city.

=== Preservation ===
After its destruction during WWII, Fort Santiago was declared as a Shrine of Freedom in 1951. Its restoration by the Philippine government did not begin till 1953 under the hands of the National Parks Development Committee. The Intramuros Administration rebuilt the gate in 1982 after the gate was destroyed during World War 2. The Intramuros Administration now manages the reconstruction, maintenance, and management of the fort since 1992.

== Gallery ==
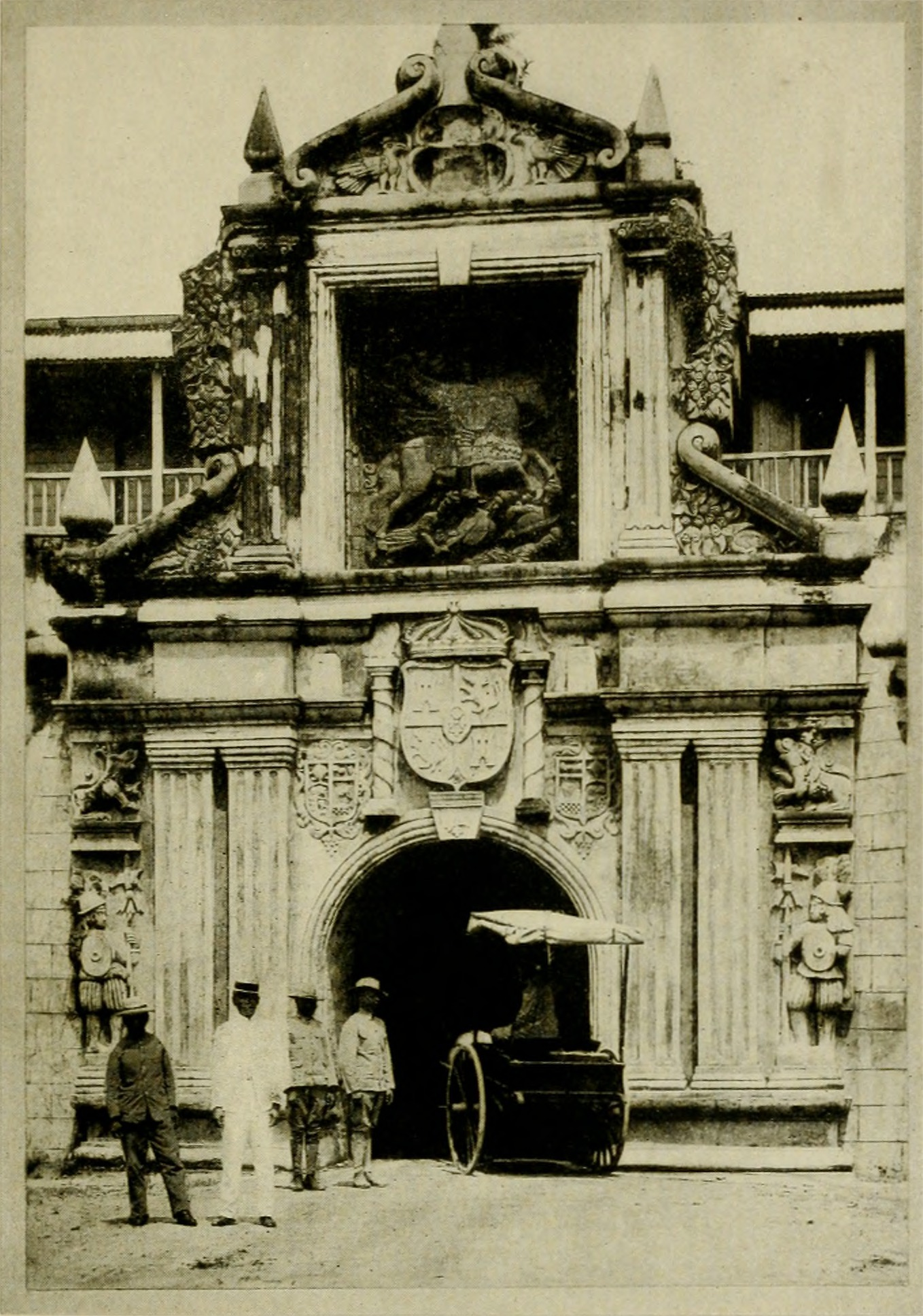
Fort Santiago in 1913

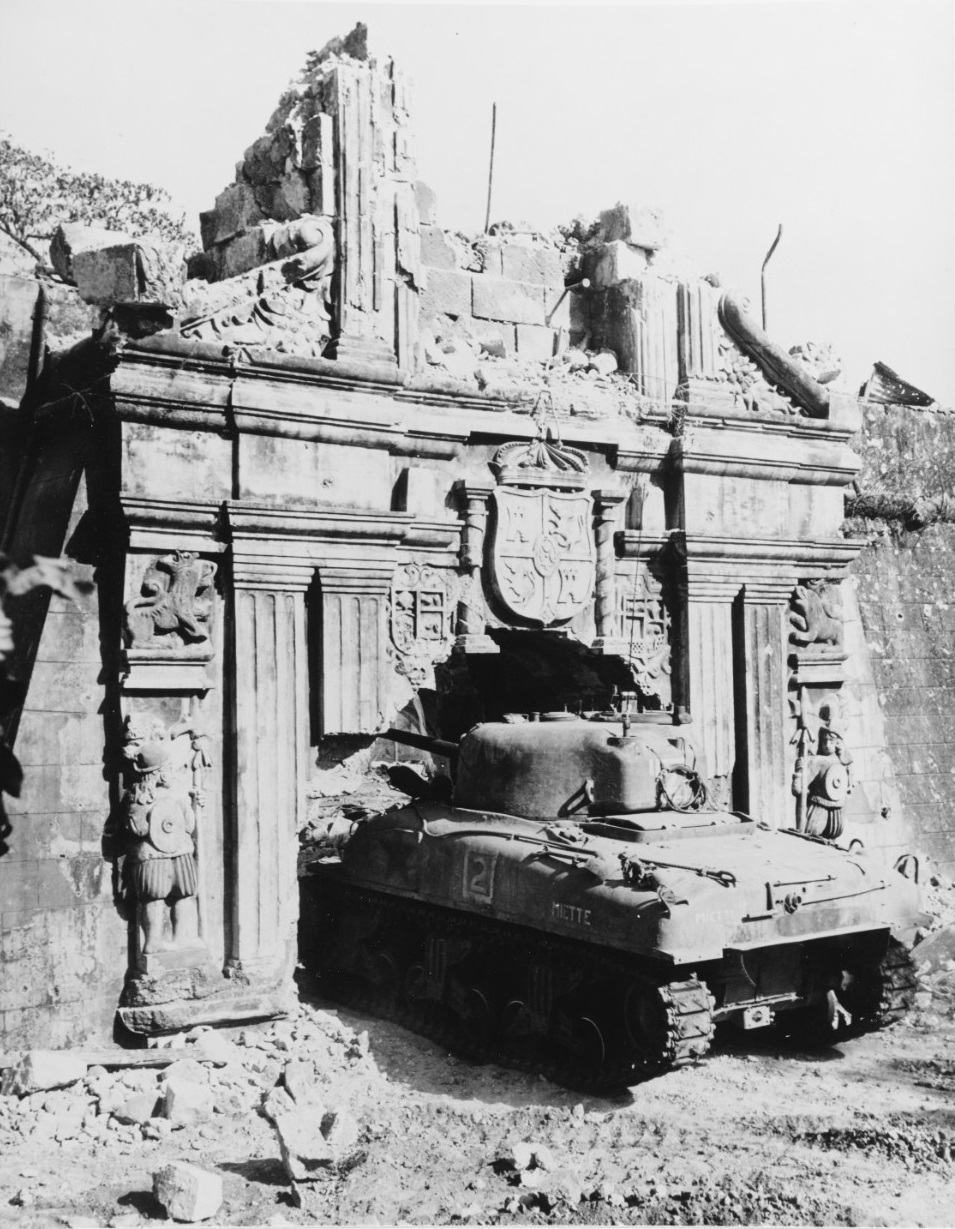
A U.S. Army M4 Sherman enters the fort during the Battle of Manila, 1945

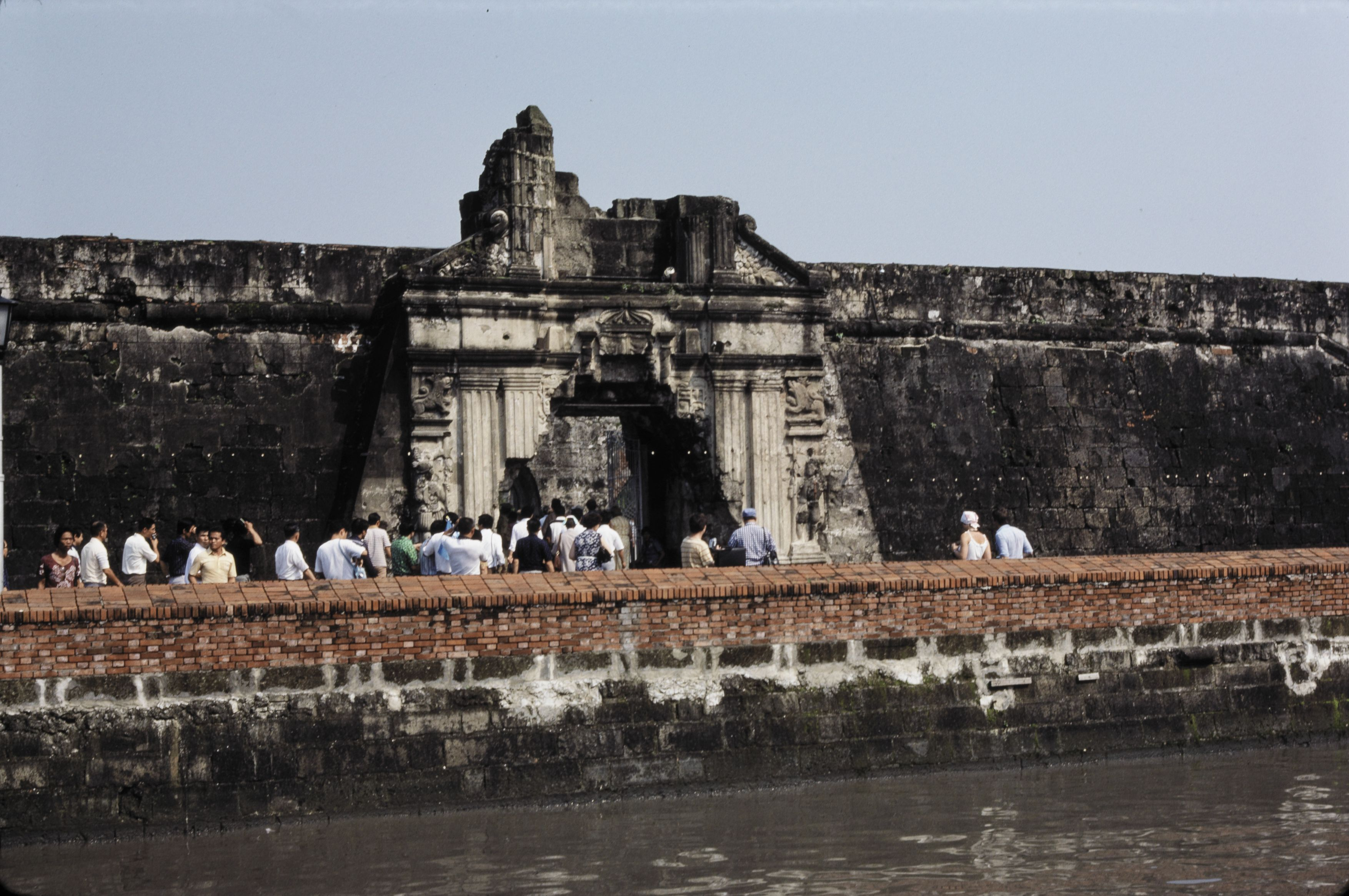
Fort Santiago gate before its reconstruction and restoration

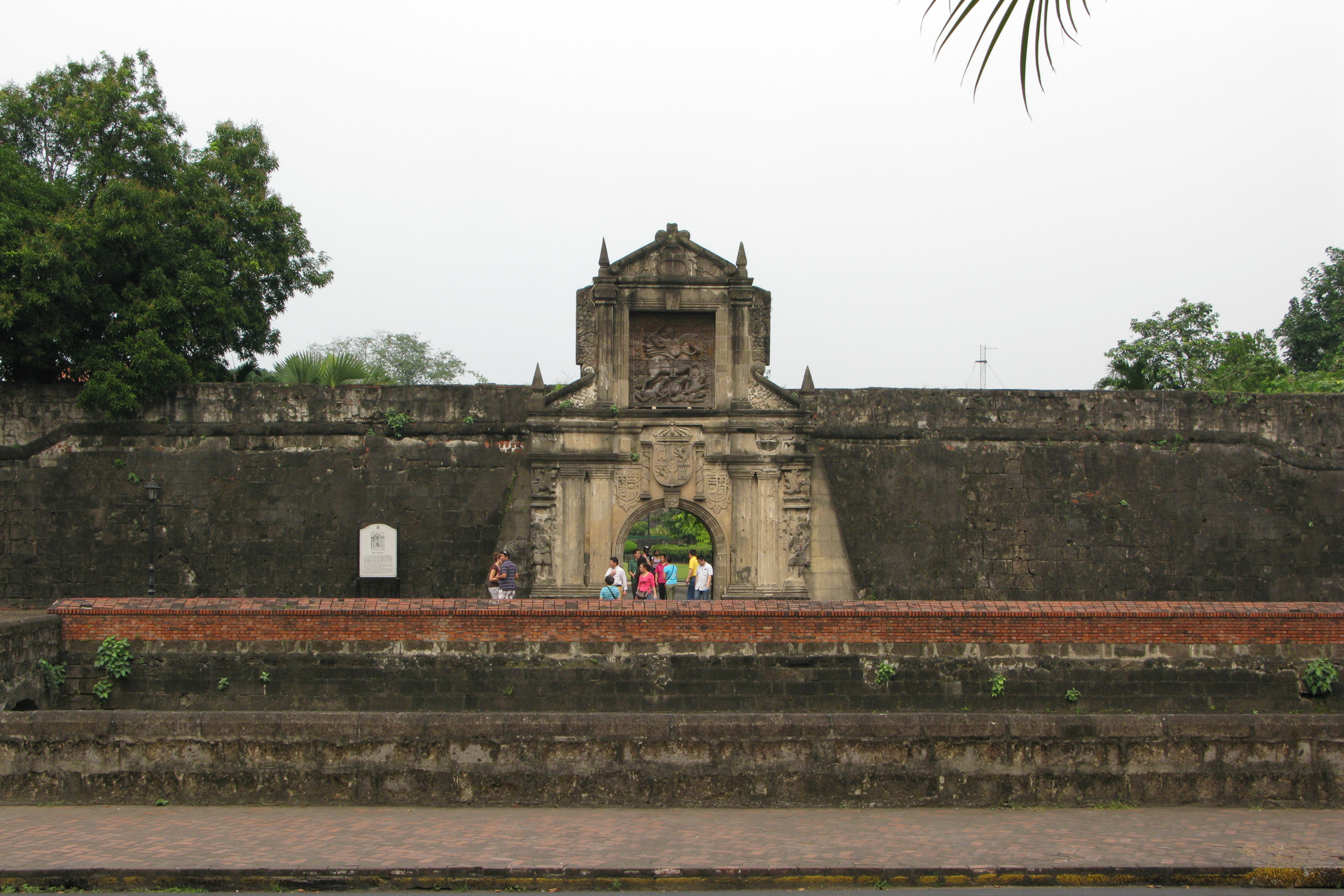
Fort Santiago gate after restoration

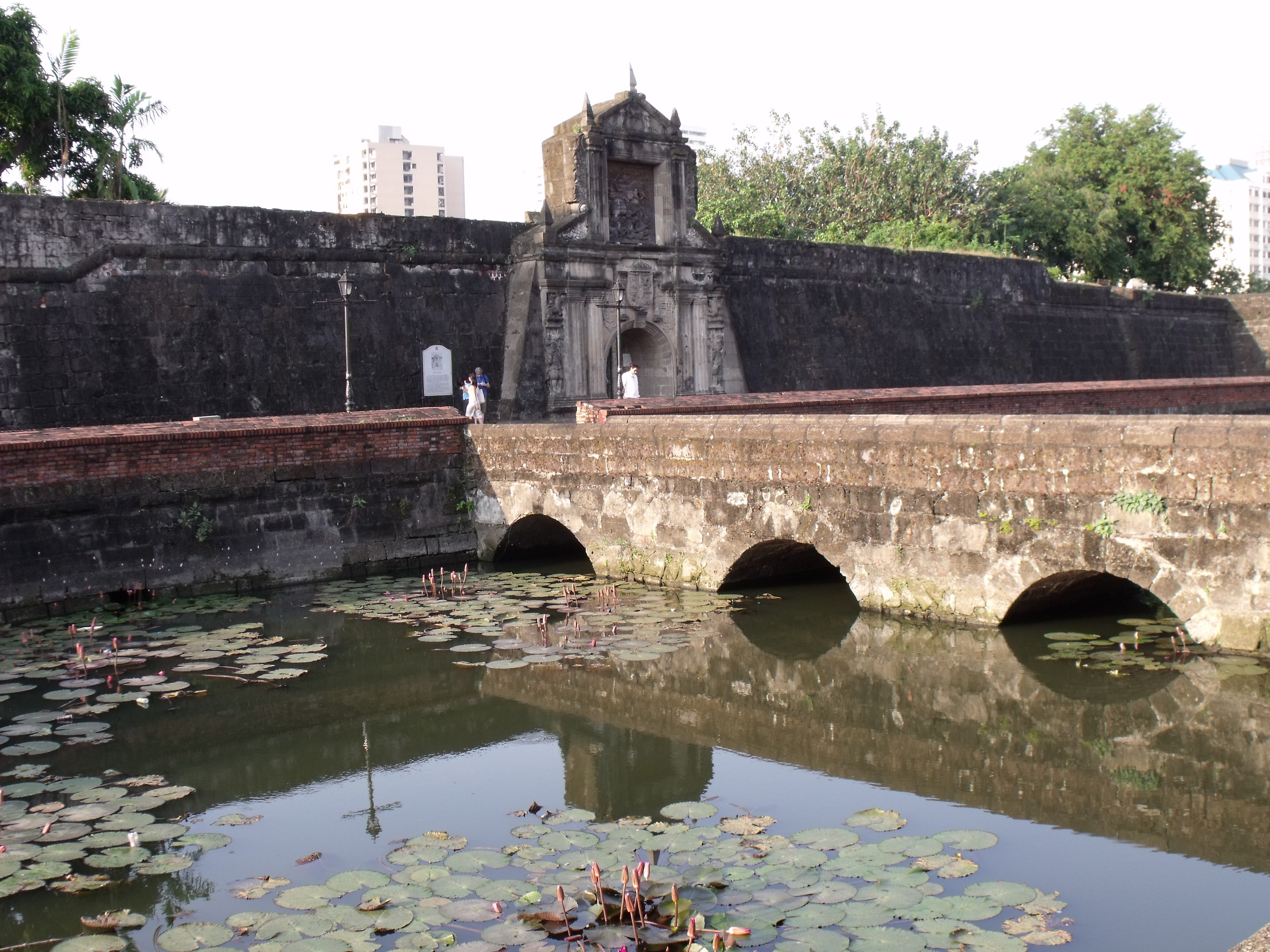
The entrance of Fort Santiago

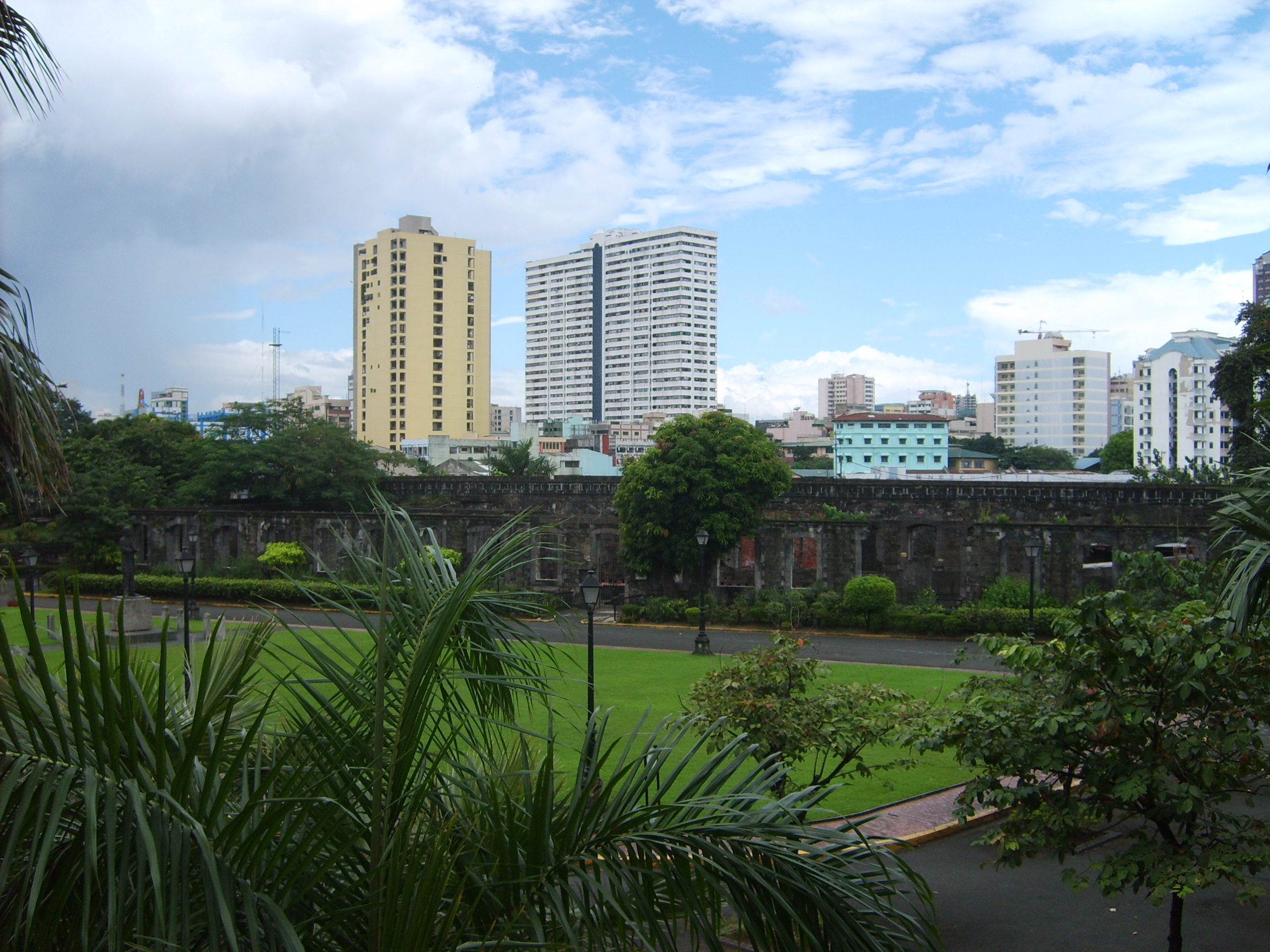
The grounds of Fort Santiago with the Binondo skyline in the background

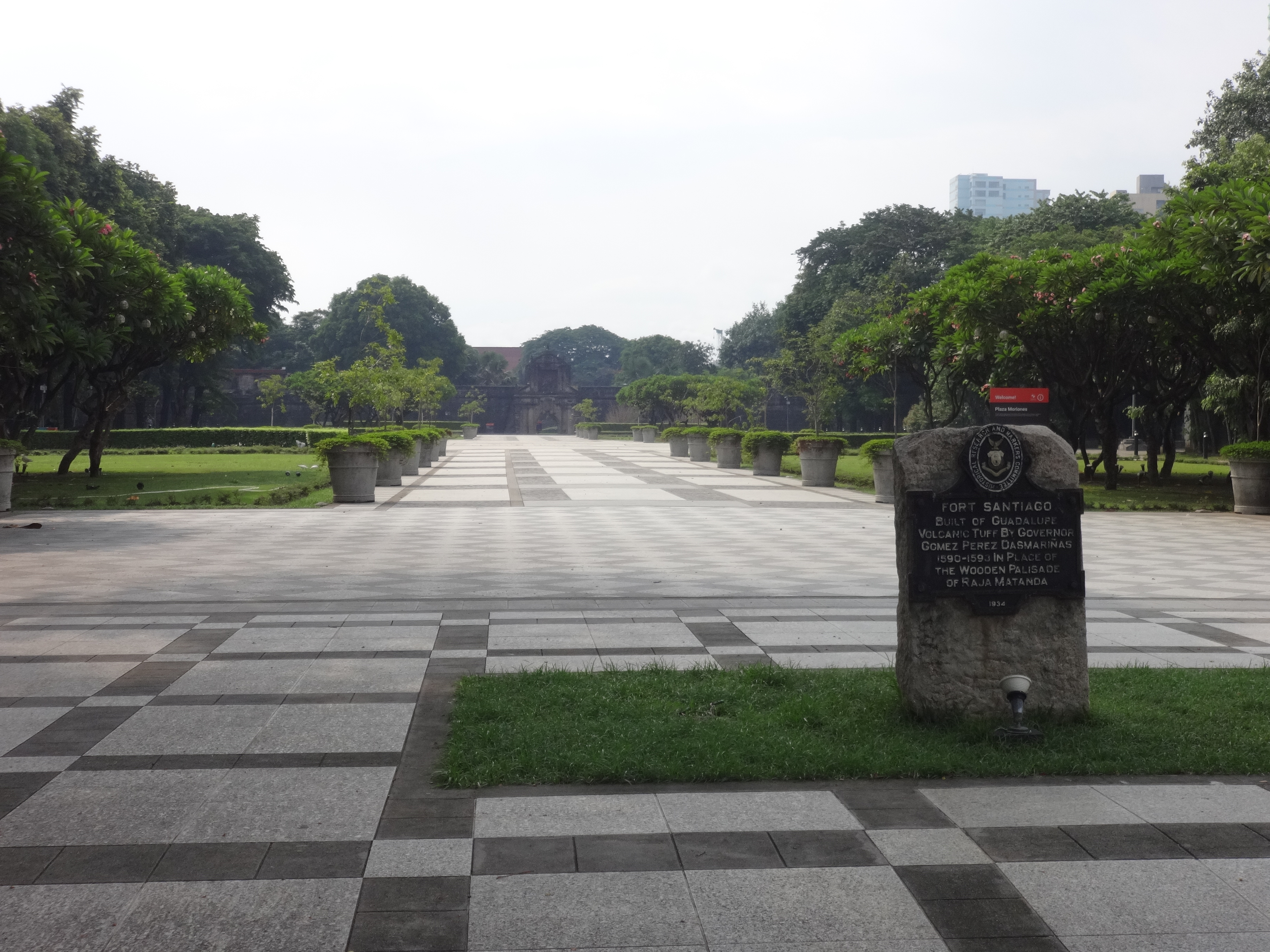
Fort Santiago in 2020

== See also ==
- Fort of San Antonio Abad
