= Plaza de Armas, San Juan =

Square in San Juan, Puerto Rico

Coordinates: 18°27′55″N 66°7′0″W

- Plaza de Armas
- U.S. National Historic Landmark District – Contributing property
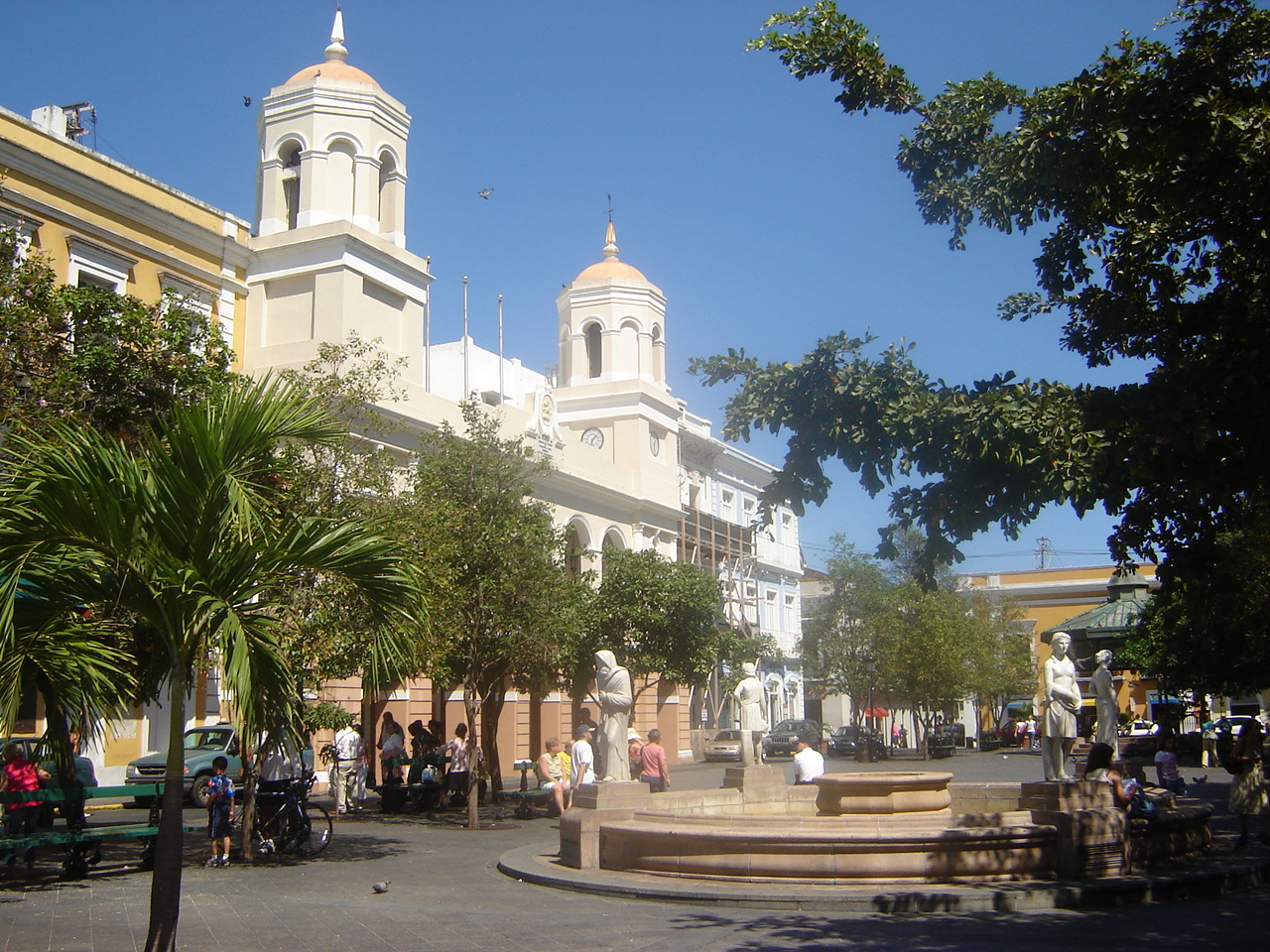
- Plaza de Armas with the San Juan City Hall in the background.
- Location: San Juan Antiguo, San Juan, Puerto Rico
- Built: 1521
- Part of: Old San Juan Historic District (ID72001553)
- Designated NHLDCP: October 10, 1972

The Plaza de Armas of San Juan, formerly known as the Plaza Mayor, is a plaza de armas and one of the main squares in San Juan, the capital of Puerto Rico. It is located on the Fortaleza and San José Streets in Old San Juan. Built in 1521, it was designed to serve as both the original main square and market square for the city. San Juan City Hall is located to the north of the square, while the Puerto Rico Department of State lies at the west.

The square's main feature is a round fountain with four marble statues representing "The Four Seasons", originally placed in the four corners of the square, which had been commissioned by then governor of Puerto Rico Juan de la Pezuela y Cevallos in 1856 to the "motherland", to be placed in Paseo La Princesa esplanade in Old San Juan.

== Gallery ==
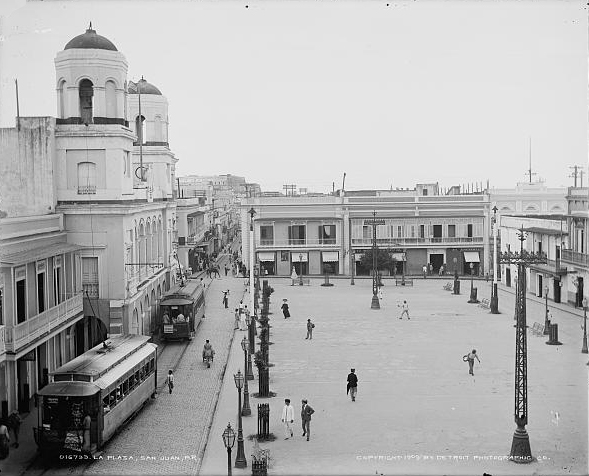
Plaza de Armas in 1902.

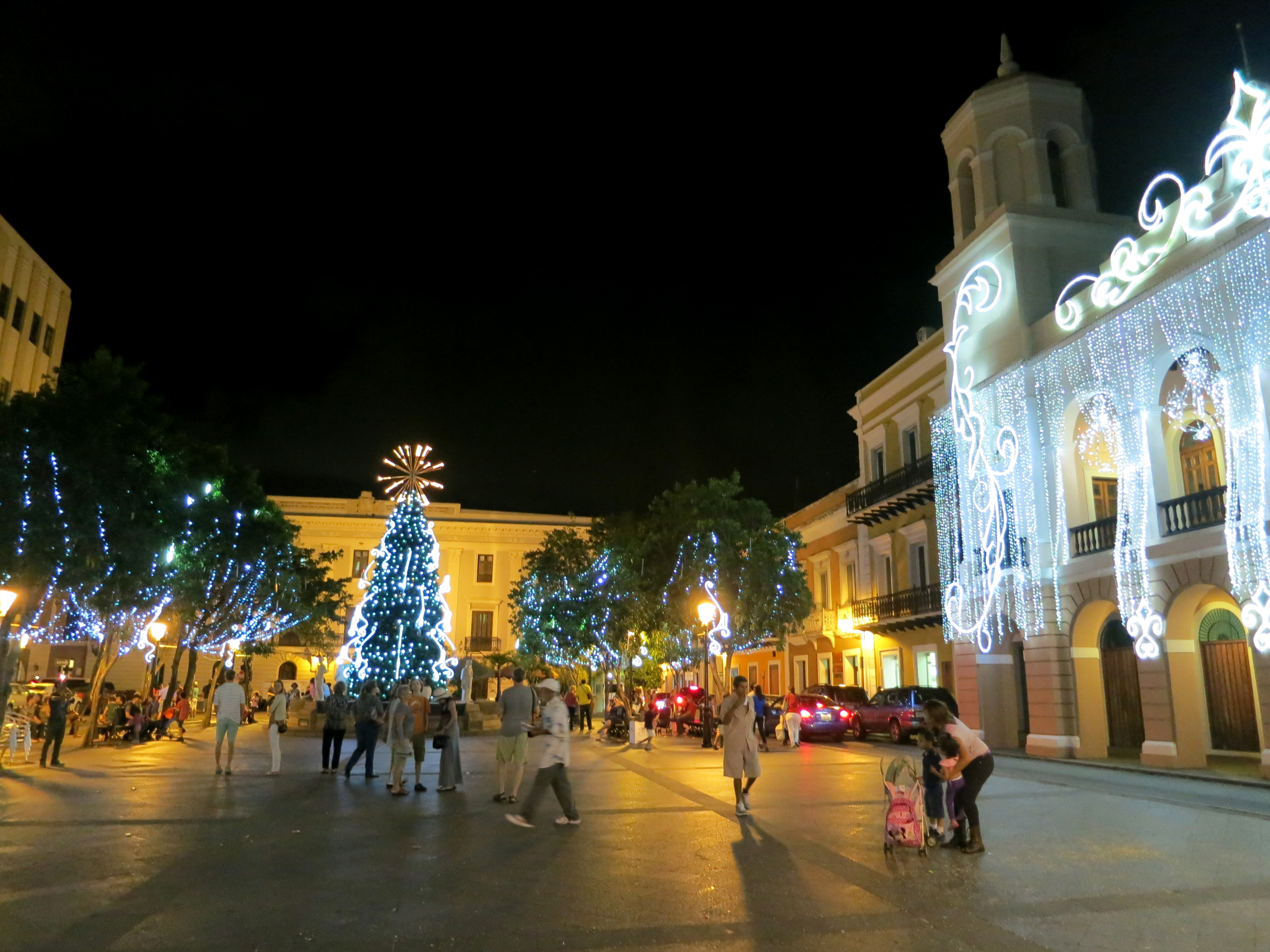
Plaza de Armas, San Juan during Christmas

=== "The Four Seasons" fountain ===
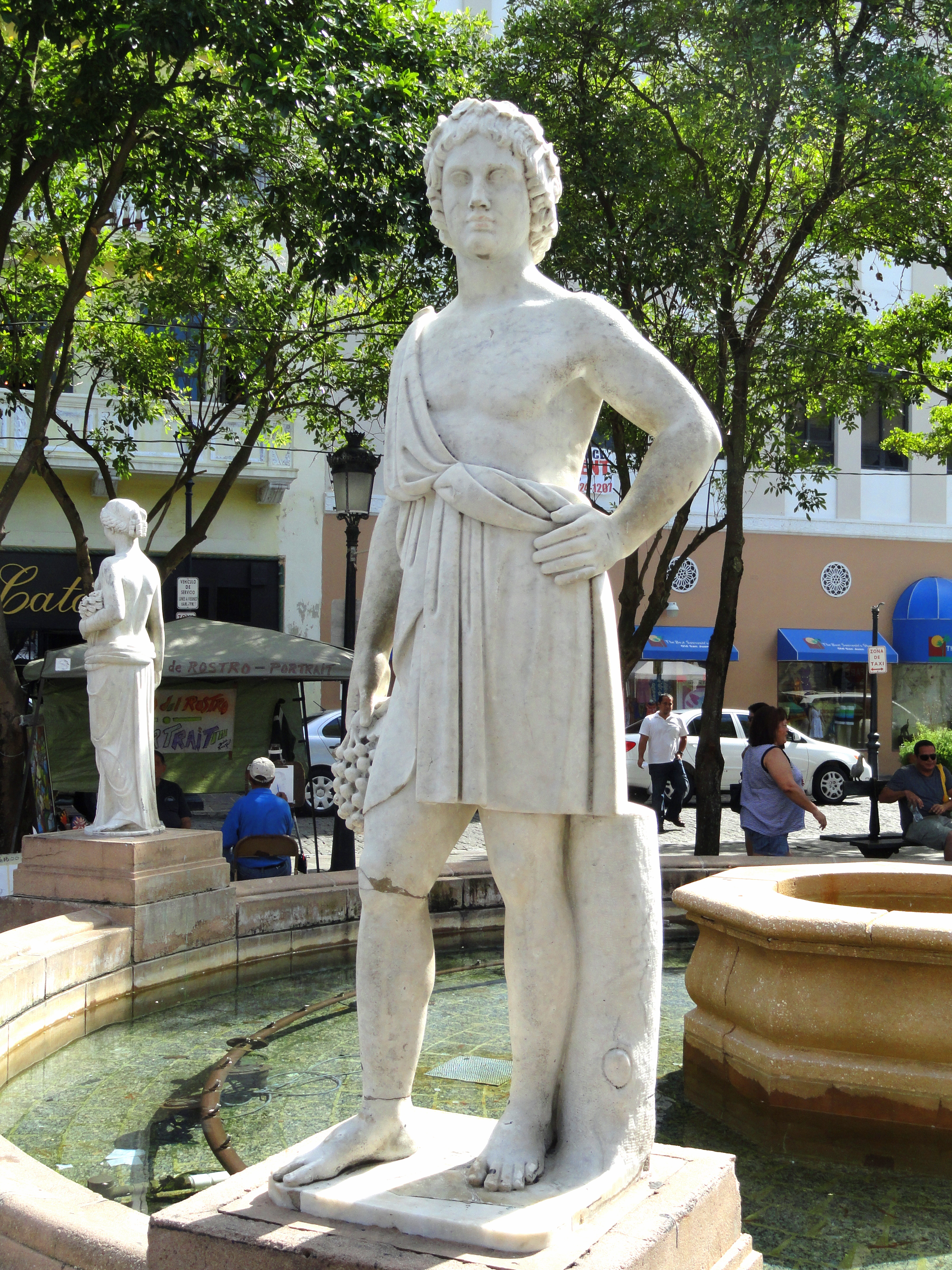
Autumn

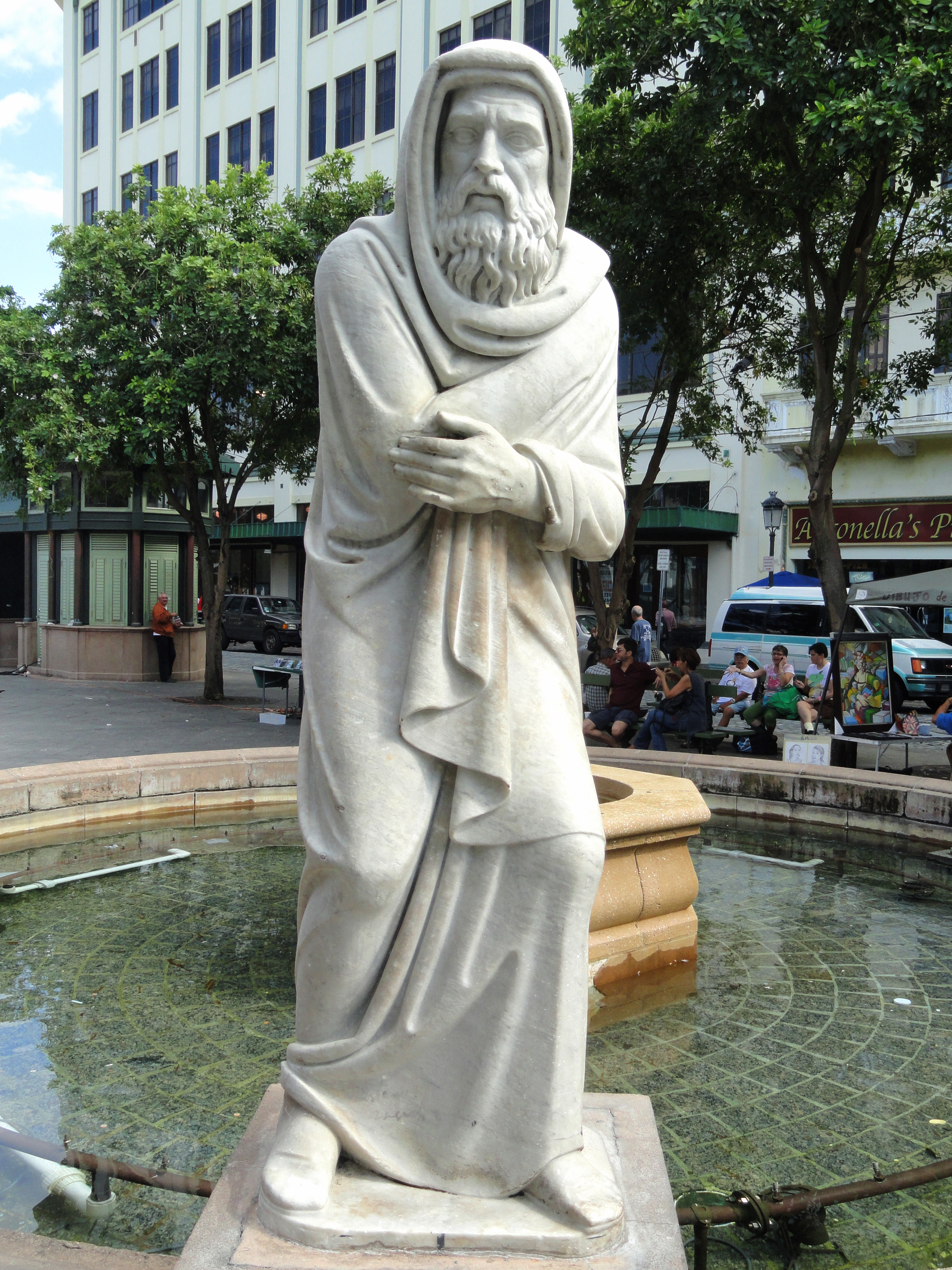
Winter

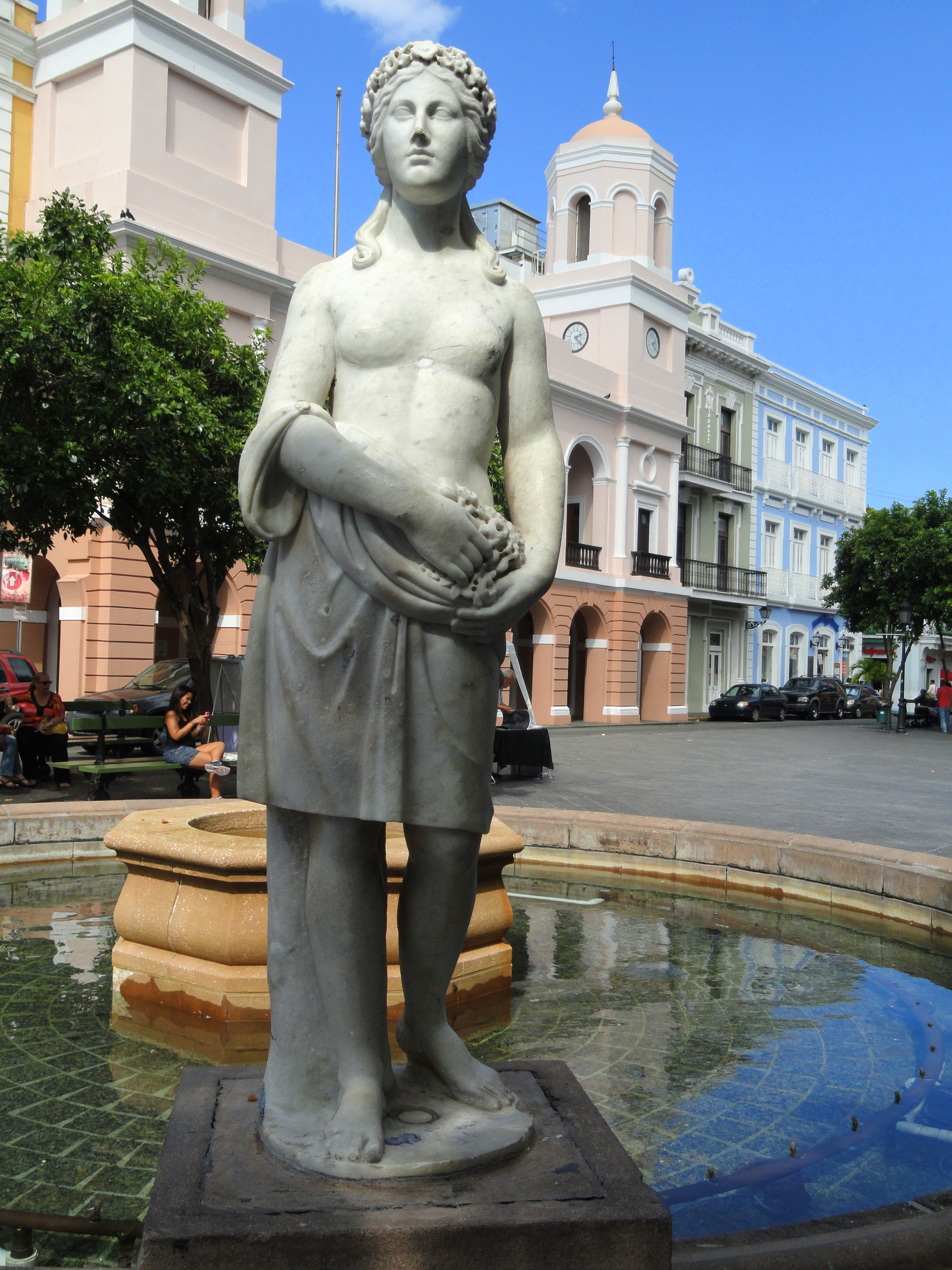
Spring

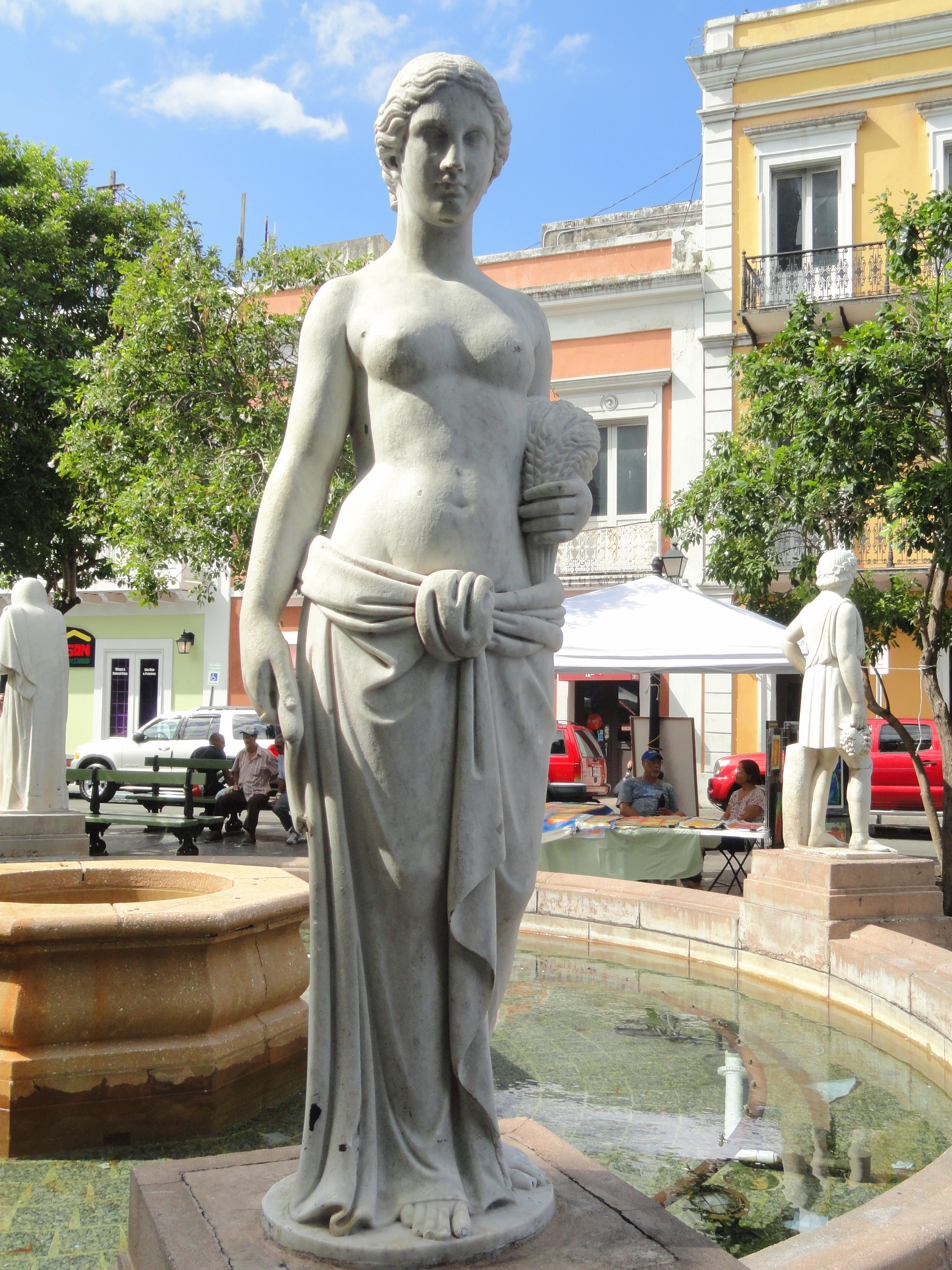
Summer
