= List of parks in Metro Manila =

This is a partial list of parks, public squares and protected areas in and around Metro Manila, Philippines.

== Urban parks ==
National Park or part of a National Park

| Image | Name | Location | Coordinates | Size |
|---|---|---|---|---|
| | Ayala Triangle Gardens | Bel-Air, Makati | 14°33′24″N 121°01′28″E | 2 ha (4.9 acres) |
| | Baywalk | Ermita and Malate, Manila | 14°34′05″N 120°58′59″E | |
| | Malacañang Park | Paco, Manila | 14°35′39″N 120°59′55″E | 5 ha (12 acres) |
| | Marikina River Park | Santo Niño, Marikina | 14°37′47″N 121°05′03″E | 220 ha (540 acres) |
| | Mehan Garden | Ermita, Manila | 14°35′33″N 120°58′50″E | 1 ha (2.5 acres) |
| | Paco Park | Paco, Manila | 14°34′52″N 120°59′20″E | 1 ha (2.5 acres) |
| | Pasig River Esplanade | Ermita and Intramuros, Manila | 14°35′45″N 120°58′42″E | |
| | Pinaglabanan Shrine | Corazon de Jesus, San Juan | 14°36′17″N 121°01′52″E | 5 ha (12 acres) |
| | Quezon Memorial Circle | Diliman, Quezon City | 14°39′04″N 121°02′57″E | 26 ha (64 acres) |
| | Rizal Park | Ermita, Manila | 14°35′00″N 120°58′42″E | 54 ha (130 acres) |
| | Tandang Sora National Shrine | Tandang Sora, Quezon City | 14°40′59″N 121°2′43″E | 0.1 ha (0.25 acres) |
| | Taguig People's Park | West Rembo, Taguig | 14°33′53″N 121°03′21″E | 3.5 ha (8.6 acres) |
| | TLC Park | Lower Bicutan, Taguig | 14°33′53″N 121°03′21″E | 1 ha (2.5 acres) |

== Nature parks ==
| Image | Name | Location | Coordinates | Size |
|---|---|---|---|---|
| | Arroceros Forest Park | Ermita, Manila | 14°35′39″N 120°58′54″E | 2 ha (4.9 acres) |
| | Balara Filters Park | Diliman, Quezon City | 14°39′25″N 121°04′43″E | 60 ha (150 acres) |
| | Isla Pulo | Tanza, Navotas | 14°34′14″N 120°59′00″E | 29.5 ha (73 acres) |
| | La Mesa Ecopark | Greater Lagro, Quezon City | 14°42′43″N 121°04′27.5″E | 33 ha (82 acres) |
| | Manila Zoological and Botanical Garden | Malate, Manila | 14.5647412°N 120.9886014°E | 5.5 ha (14 acres) |
| | Ninoy Aquino Parks and Wildlife Center | Diliman, Quezon City | 14°39′04″N 121°02′33″E | 65 ha (160 acres) |
| | Pasig Rainforest Park | Maybunga, Pasig | 14°34′28″N 121°05′53″E | 8 ha (20 acres) |
| | University of the Philippines Arboretum | U.P. Campus, Quezon City | 14°39′38″N 121°03′05″E | 16 ha (40 acres) |

== Nature reserves ==
| Image | Name | Location | Coordinates | Size |
|---|---|---|---|---|
| | La Mesa Watershed Reservation | Quezon City | 14°44′37″N 121°06′03″E | 2,000 ha (4,900 acres) |
| | Las Piñas–Parañaque Critical Habitat and Ecotourism Area (LPPCHEA) | Parañaque and Las Piñas | 14°29′44″N 120°58′56″E | 175 ha (430 acres) |

== Notable plazas ==
| Image | Name | Location | Coordinates |
|---|---|---|---|
| | Liwasang Bonifacio | Ermita, Manila | 14°35′40″N 120°58′46″E |
| | Plaza Cervantes | Binondo, Manila | 14°35′49″N 120°58′33″E |
| | Plaza de Armas | Intramuros, Manila | 14°35′40″N 120°58′12″E |
| | Plaza Dilao | Paco, Manila | 14°34′50″N 120°59′58″E |
| | Plaza de España | Intramuros, Manila | 14°35′37″N 120°58′28″E |
| Plaza Lacson (Santa Cruz, Manila)(2017-06-25) | Plaza Lacson | Santa Cruz, Manila | 14°35′55″N 120°58′50″E |
| | Plaza Mexico | Intramuros, Manila | 14°35′40″N 120°58′29″E |
| | Plaza Miranda | Quiapo, Manila | 14°35′54″N 120°59′01″E |
| | Plaza Moraga | Binondo, Manila | 14°35′48″N 120°58′36″E |
| | Plaza Moriones (Intramuros) | Intramuros, Manila | 14°35′40″N 120°58′12″E |
| | Plaza Moriones (Tondo) | Tondo, Manila | 14°35′36″N 120°58′16″E |
| | Plaza Rajah Sulayman | Malate, Manila | 14°34′08″N 120°59′01″E |
| | Plaza de Roma | Intramuros, Manila | 14°35′32″N 120°58′23″E |
| | Plaza San Lorenzo Ruiz | Binondo, Manila | 14°36′01″N 120°58′26″E |
| | UST Plaza Mayor | Sampaloc, Manila | 14°36′35″N 120°59′23″E |

== Community parks and squares ==
| Image | Name | Location |
|---|---|---|
| | Acropolis Park | Libis, Quezon City |
| | Agrifina Circle | Ermita, Manila |
| | Aguirre Central Park | BF Homes, Parañaque |
| | Alabang River Park | Alabang, Muntinlupa |
| | Alveo Central Plaza | Bonifacio Global City, Taguig |
| | APEC Sculpture Garden | CCP Complex, Pasay |
| | ASEAN Garden | Malate, Manila |
| | Arkong Bato Park | Arkong Bato, Valenzuela |
| | ASEAN Gardens | Intramuros, Manila |
| | Bacood Park | Santa Mesa, Manila |
| | Baltao Park | Santo Niño, Parañaque |
| | Barangay San Antonio Pocket Garden | San Antonio, Pasig |
| | Battle of Zapote Bridge Park | Zapote, Las Piñas |
| | Bayanan Baywalk | Bayanan, Muntinlupa |
| | Bernardo Park | Kamuning, Quezon City |
| | BGC Greenway Park | Bonifacio Global City, Taguig |
| | Bonifacio Shrine | Ermita, Manila |
| | Buendia Freedom Park | San Antonio, Makati |
| | Burgos Circle | Bonifacio Global City, Taguig |
| | C.P. Garcia Community Park | Diliman, Quezon City |
| | Capitol Commons Park | Kapitolyo, Pasig |
| | Campanilla Park | Dasmariñas Village, Makati |
| | China-Philippines Friendship Park | Intramuros, Manila |
| | Central Garden | Greenhills, Greenhills, San Juan |
| | Christine Village Park | Santolan, Pasig |
| | Corinthian Gardens Park | Ugong Norte, Quezon City |
| | Cuenca Park | Ayala Alabang, Muntinlupa |
| | De Jesus Oval Park | Bonifacio Global City, Taguig |
| | Dolphin Park | Makati CBD, Makati |
| | Don Bosco Football Field | Pag-asa, Mandaluyong |
| | Don Galo Park | Don Galo, Parañaque |
| | Don Jose Heights Park | Commonwealth, Quezon City |
| | DOST Plaza | Lower Bicutan, Taguig |
| | Earnshaw Linear Park | Santa Ana, Manila |
| | Eastwood Central Park | Libis, Quezon City |
| | EDSA-Buendia Park | Makati |
| | EDSA-Pinagkaisahan Park | Pinagkaisahan, Makati |
| | Ermitaño Linear Park | Ermitaño, San Juan |
| | Evolution Park Marikina | Marikina Heights, Marikina |
| | Elizalde Park | BF Homes, Parañaque |
| | Estero de Magdalena Linear Park | Tondo, Manila |
| | Eugenio Park | Marcelo Green, Parañaque |
| | Filinvest City Central Park | Alabang, Muntinlupa |
| | Filinvest Park Batasan | Batasan Hills, Quezon City |
| | Forbes Town Park and Lagoon | Bonifacio Global City, Taguig |
| | FTI Park | FTI Complex, Taguig |
| | Glorieta Park | Tala, Caloocan |
| | Glorietta 3 Park | Makati CBD, Makati |
| | Greenbelt Park | Makati CBD, Makati |
| | Guadalajara Park | Merville, Parañaque |
| | Guadalupe Linear Park | Guadalupe Nuevo, Makati |
| | Guadalupe Viejo Cloverleaf Park | Guadalupe Viejo, Makati |
| | Guava Park | Ayala Alabang, Muntinlupa |
| | Hacienda Heights Park | Concepcion Dos, Marikina |
| | Hardin ng Pag-asa | Addition Hills, Mandaluyong |
| | Ilaya Park | Santolan, Pasig |
| | Industrial Valley Complex Park (FVR Road Park) | Industrial Valley, Marikina |
| | Jackson Park | Greenhills, San Juan |
| | Johnson Park | Greenhills, San Juan |
| | J.Y. Campos Park | Bonifacio Global City, Taguig |
| | Kapitolyo Park | Kapitolyo, Pasig |
| | Kennely Ann L. Binay Park (Guadalupe Nuevo Cloverleaf Park) | Guadalupe Nuevo, Makati |
| | Lagro Dulo Park | North Fairview, Quezon City |
| | Legazpi Active Park | Makati CBD, Makati |
| | Liwasan ng mga Bayani Park | Alabang, Muntinlupa |
| | Liwasang Balagtas | Pandacan, Manila |
| | Madrigal Circle Park | Ugong Norte, Quezon City |
| | Magallanes Interchange Park | Magallanes, Makati |
| | Maharlika Village Park | Maharlika Village, Taguig |
| | Mahogany Park | Dasmariñas Village, Makati |
| | Makati Poblacion Park | Poblacion, Makati |
| | Makiling Park | Ayala Alabang, Muntinlupa |
| | Malabon People's Park | Catmon, Malabon |
| | Mandaluyong Freedom Park | Addition Hills, Mandaluyong |
| | Mariana Park | New Manila, Quezon City |
| | Maysilo Circle Park | Plainview, Mandaluyong |
| | McKinley Park | Greenhills, San Juan |
| | Marikina Freedom Park | Santa Elena, Marikina |
| | Meridian Park | Bay City, Pasay |
| | Mother Ignacia Park | Grace Park, Caloocan |
| | Muntinlupa Sunken Garden | Poblacion, Muntinlupa |
| | Namayan Park | Namayan, Mandaluyong |
| | Narra Park | Ayala Alabang, Muntinlupa |
| | Navotas Centennial Park | Bagumbayan North, Navotas |
| | North Olympus Park | Novaliches, Quezon City |
| | N.S. Amoranto Park | Santa Teresita, Quezon City |
| | Ortigas Park | San Antonio, Pasig |
| | Osano Park | Upper Bicutan, Taguig |
| | Palmera Homes Park | Novaliches, Quezon City |
| | Pandacan Linear Park | Pandacan, Manila |
| | Paraiso ng Batang Maynila | Malate, Manila |
| | Paterno Circle Park | Ugong Norte, Quezon City |
| | Philamlife Village Park | Pamplona Dos, Las Piñas |
| | Philippines–Thailand Friendship Circle | Santa Ana, Manila |
| | Pilar Friendship Park | Pilar Village, Las Piñas |
| | Plaza Avanceña | Quiapo, Manila |
| | Plaza Avelino | Sampaloc, Manila |
| | Plaza Aviles | San Miguel, Manila |
| | Plaza Benavides | Sampaloc, Manila |
| | Plaza Bonifacio | Kapasigan, Pasig |
| | Plaza Bonifacio | Ligid-Tipas, Taguig |
| | Plaza Cristo Rey | Poblacion, Makati |
| | Plaza de Borja | Poblacion, Pateros |
| | Plaza de la Virgen | Pandacan, Manila |
| | Plaza del Carmen | Quiapo |
| | Plaza del Conde | San Nicolas, Manila |
| | Plaza Felipe Calderon | Santa Ana, Manila |
| | Plaza Ferguson | Ermita, Manila |
| | Plaza Hernandez | Tondo, Manila |
| | Plaza Hugo | Santa Ana, Manila |
| | Plaza Hulong Duhat | Hulong Duhat, Malabon |
| | Plaza Isabelo de los Reyes | Sampaloc, Manila |
| | Plaza La Huerta | La Huerta, Parañaque |
| | Plaza Lachambre | Binondo, Manila |
| | Plaza Quezon | Santa Ana, Taguig |
| | Plaza Morga | Tondo, Manila |
| | Plaza Noli | Sampaloc |
| | Plaza Olivia Salamanca | Ermita, Manila |
| | Plaza Quezon | Elias Aldana, Las Piñas |
| | Plaza Rizal | Malinao, Pasig |
| | Plaza Rizal | Daniel Fajardo, Las Piñas |
| | Plaza Rodriguez | San Agustin, Malabon |
| | Plaza Rueda | Paco, Manila |
| | Plaza Santo Tomas | Intramuros, Manila |
| | Plaza Yuchengco | Binondo, Manila |
| | Plazuela de Santa Isabel | Intramuros, Manila |
| | Polo Mini Park | Polo, Valenzuela |
| | Remedios Circle | Malate, Manila |
| | Rosalia Park | Tandang Sora, Quezon City |
| | Salcedo Park | Bel-Air, Makati |
| | San Juan Mini Park | Pedro Cruz, San Juan |
| | San Juanico Park | Ayala Alabang, Muntinlupa |
| | Santiago and Libertad Cua Park | Carmona, Makati |
| | Spectrum Linear Park | Alabang, Muntinlupa |
| | Spectrum Piazza | Alabang, Muntinlupa |
| | Sucat People's Park | Sucat, Muntinlupa |
| | Sun Valley Park | Sun Valley, Parañaque |
| | Tabuena Park | Ugong Norte, Quezon City |
| | Tamarind Park | Ayala Alabang, Muntinlupa |
| | Terra 28th Park | Bonifacio Global City, Taguig |
| | Track 30th Park | Bonifacio Global City, Taguig |
| | UP Lagoon | U.P. Campus, Diliman, Quezon City |
| | UP Science Park | U.P. Campus, Diliman, Quezon City |
| | UP Sunken Garden | U.P. Campus, Quezon City |
| | Valenzuela Family Park | Karuhatan, Valenzuela |
| | Valenzuela Linear Park | Valenzuela, Makati |
| | Valenzuela People's Park | Karuhatan, Valenzuela |
| | Veterans Park | Sipac Almacen, Navotas |
| | Vergara Linear Park | Vergara, Mandaluyong |
| | Washington Sycip Park | Makati CBD, Makati |
| | Wisdom Park | New Manila, Quezon City |
| | West Side LRT Park | Grace Park, Caloocan |
