= José María Rodríguez =

José María Rodríguez may refer to:

- Chema Rodríguez (handballer), Spanish handball coach and player
- José María Rodríguez Rodríguez, Cuban military man
- José Rodríguez (fencer), Argentine foil fencer

== See also ==
- José Rodríguez (disambiguation)
- José María Rodríguez-Acosta, Spanish painter
- José María Rodríguez y Cos, Mexican writer
