= José Manuel Rodrigues =

José Manuel Rodrigues may refer to:

- José Manuel Rodrigues (photographer)
- José Manuel Rodrigues (politician)

== See also ==
- José Manuel Rodríguez (disambiguation)
