= Glorieta Park =

Park in Caloocan, Philippines

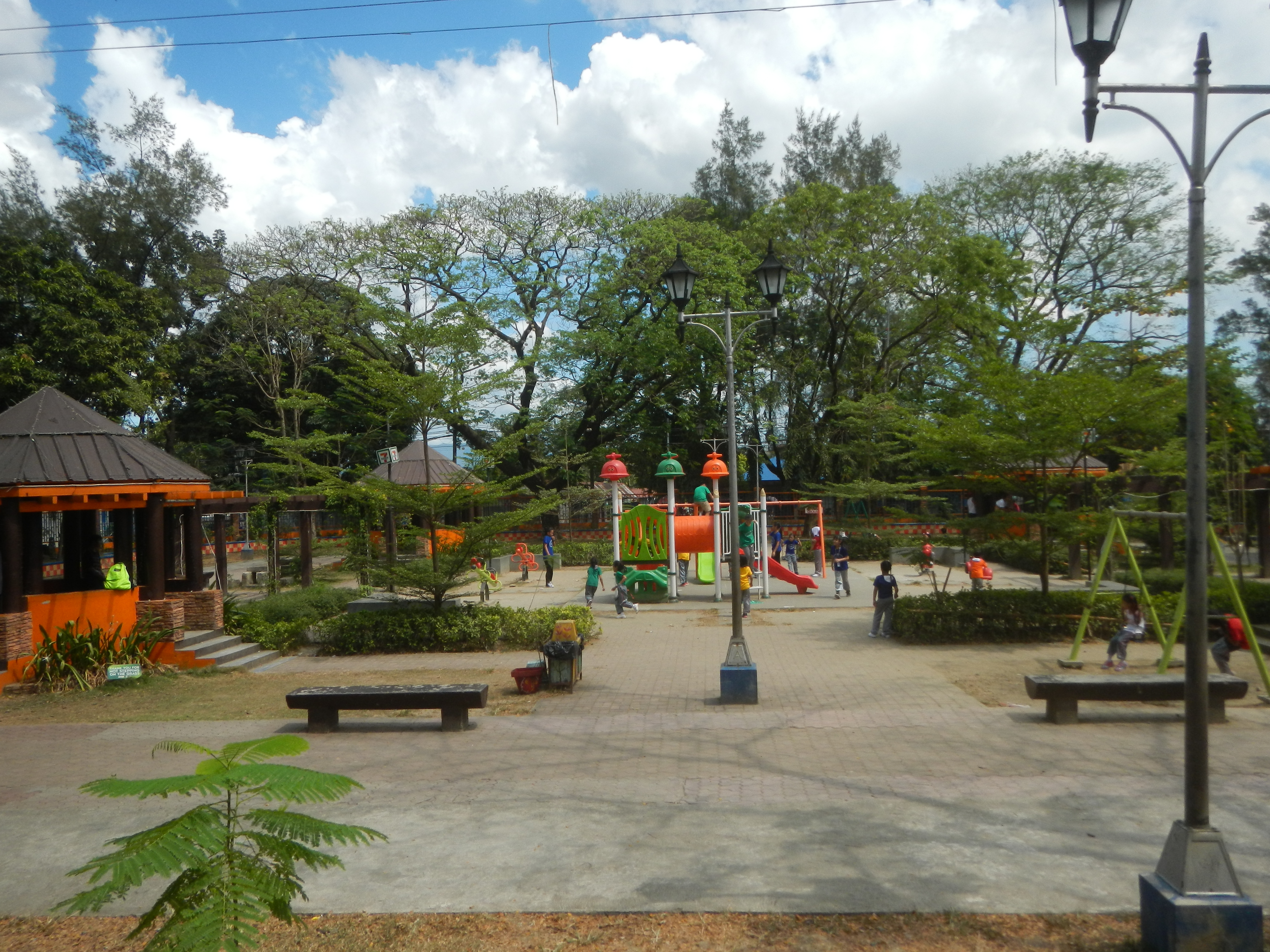
- Glorieta Park in Barangay 187, Tala, Caloocan
- Interactive map of Glorieta Park
- Type: Urban park
- Location: Caloocan, Philippines
- Coordinates: 14°46′3.356″N 121°3′34.47″E
- Operator: Local Government of Caloocan
- Status: Opened

Glorieta Park, sometimes spelled Glorietta Park, is an urban park in Caloocan, northern Metro Manila, the Philippines. It is situated near the border of barangays 187 and 188 (Zone 16, District III) in the former Tala Estate in North Caloocan. The park is one of three city-owned parks in Caloocan under the management of the Caloocan Parks Administration Services, the others being the Buena Park and Sports Complex in South Caloocan and the Caloocan Amparo Nature Park in eastern Tala, North Caloocan.

The park occupies the central section of the former 808-hectare (2,000-acre) friar estate known as Hacienda Tala in the old municipality of Novaliches. This estate was purchased by the Philippine Commonwealth government under President Manuel Luis Quezon in 1938 for use as a leper colony to decongest and eventually replace the San Lazaro Hospital for Hansenites in Manila. The Central Luzon Leprosarium, built in 1940, was eventually reduced to an area of 130 hectares (320 acres) in 1971 through Proclamation No. 843 issued by President Ferdinand Marcos which set aside 50 hectares (120 acres) for the National Housing Authority (Philippines), 20 hectares (49 acres) for the Caloocan local government for use as a civic center containing its city hall, public high school, stadia and park to be located at its geographic center, 10 hectares (25 acres) for the Department of Social Welfare and Development bordering the planned civic center, and the remaining 589 hectares (1,460 acres) for housing and resettlement sites to be administered by the People's Homesite and Housing Corporation.

Glorieta Park is bordered by Dr. Uyguanco Avenue, Langit Road, San Jose Street, and Quezon Drive Park and is the largest open space and recreation area in Barangay 187. It features a children's playground and the Glorieta Multi-Purpose Gymnasium, a covered court formerly known as the Glorieta Kiosk. The Our Lady of Holy Rosary Parish Church borders the park to the north. It is also the location of the Tala Health Center, the Tala Post Office, the Tala United Methodist Church and Holy Rosary College. The barangay hall of Barangay 187 lies immediately to the east on Dr. Uyguanco Avenue. It is accessible from the Caloocan districts of Camarin and Bagong Silang on the south and west via the Zabarte/Old Zabarte Road and Langit Road, and from Novaliches, Greater Lagro and Fairview on the east and southeast via Quirino Highway and Dr. Uyguanco Avenue.

In February 2012, as part of the city's 50th anniversary, the Caloocan city government under Mayor Enrico Echiverri hosted a mass wedding at the Glorieta Park wherein a total of 1,510 couples were wed in an attempt to beat India's Guinness record for holding the world's largest mass wedding.

In October 2015, Mayor Oscar Malapitan formally inaugurated the 568.75-square-meter (6,122.0 sq ft) Glorieta Amphitheater within the park which has a seating capacity of 1,500 and which will serve as a venue to showcase the talents and skills of Caloocanians. The amphitheater, which cost ₱35 million to build, was approved in the 2014 Caloocan City Supplemental Budget No. 14 under its Sangguniang Panlungsod Ordinance No. 0541.

Under the Caloocan City Comprehensive Development Plan 2017–2019, the Caloocan local government plans to construct additional sports facilities within the park, as well as a lagoon and fountain at the left and right side of the covered court, and a perimeter fence with lamp posts. The plan also includes the installation of a permanent front and back door access to the park for VIP use.

== Gallery ==
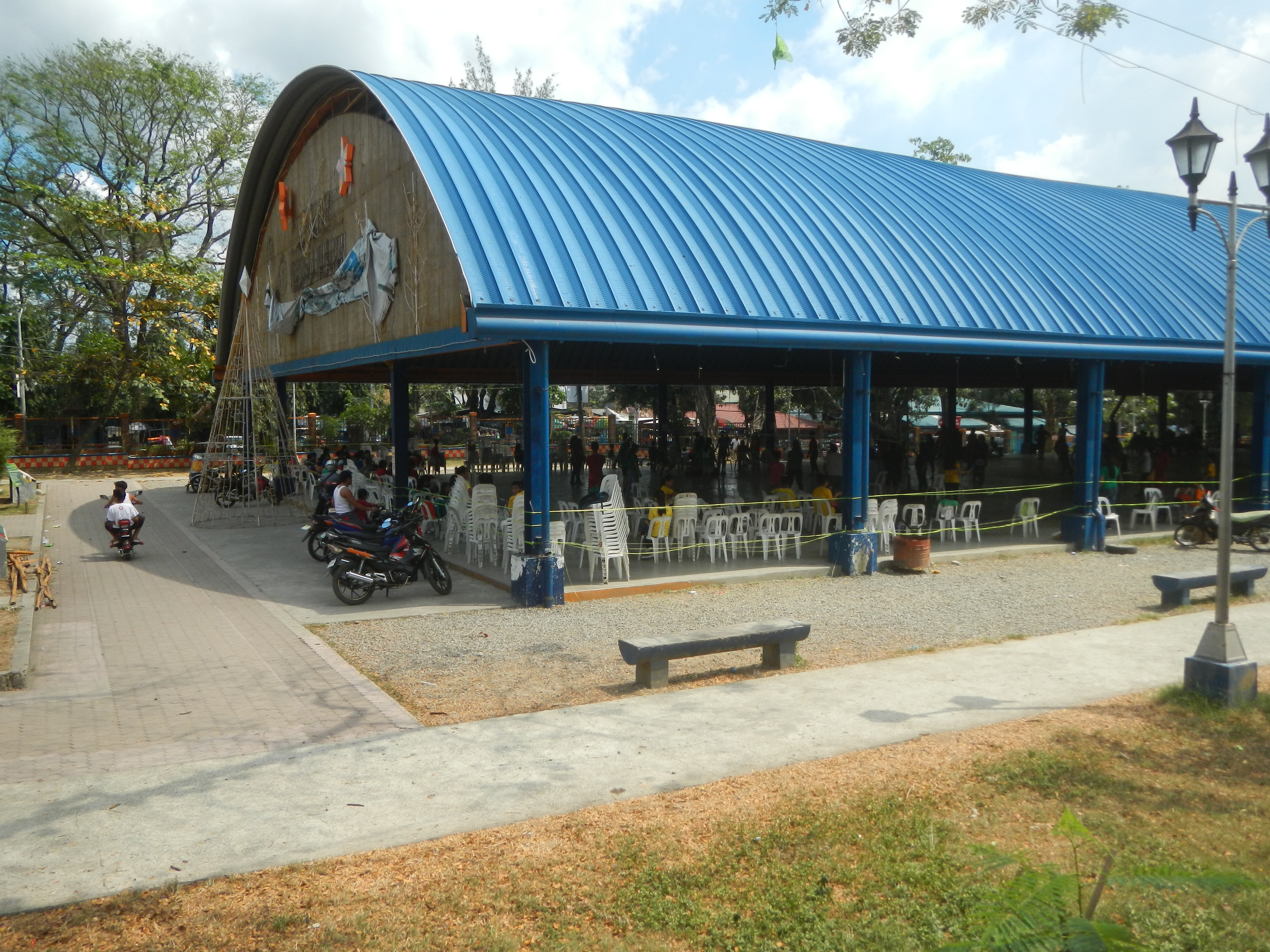
The Glorieta Multi-Purpose Gymnasium

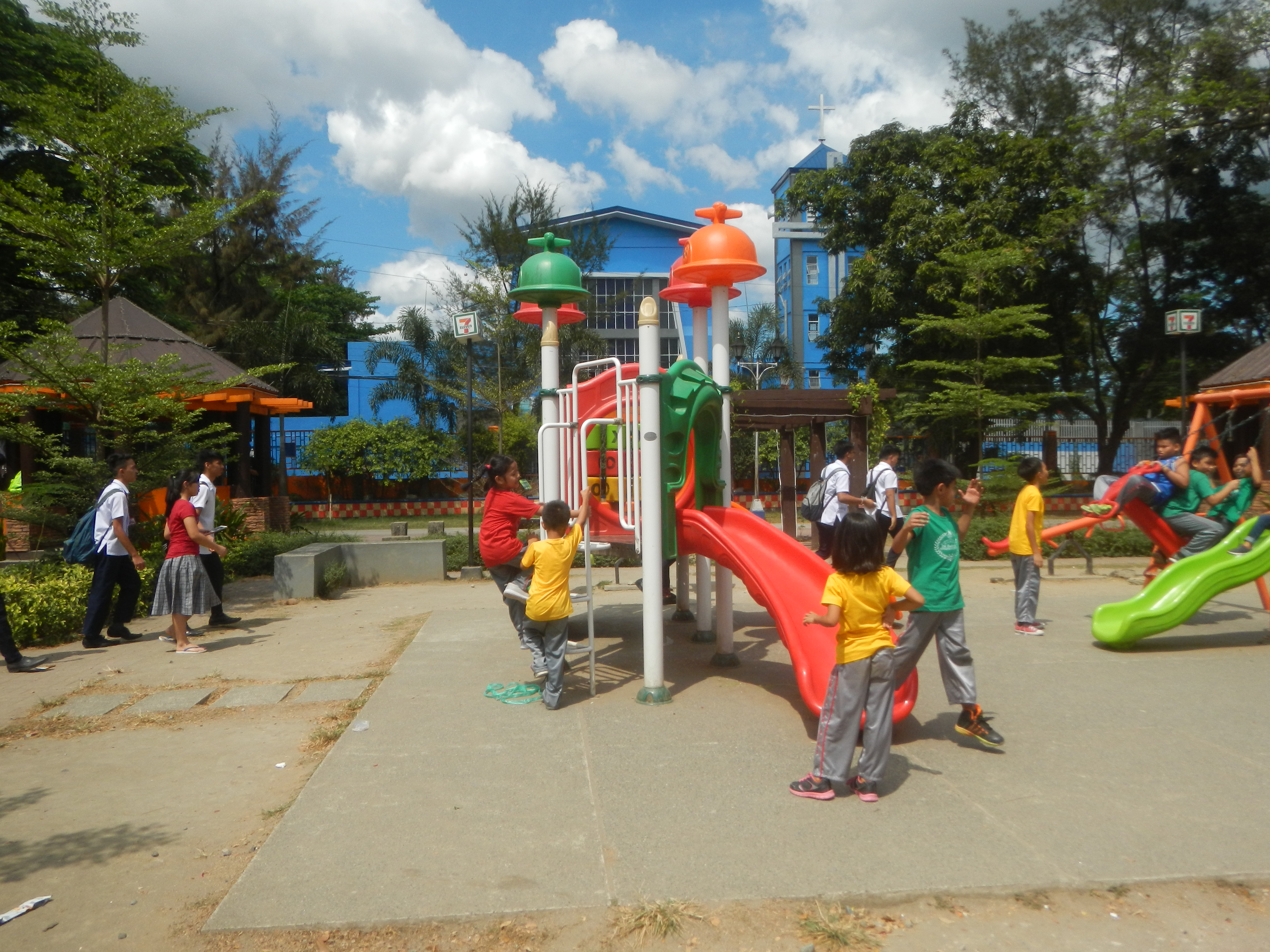
Children's playground

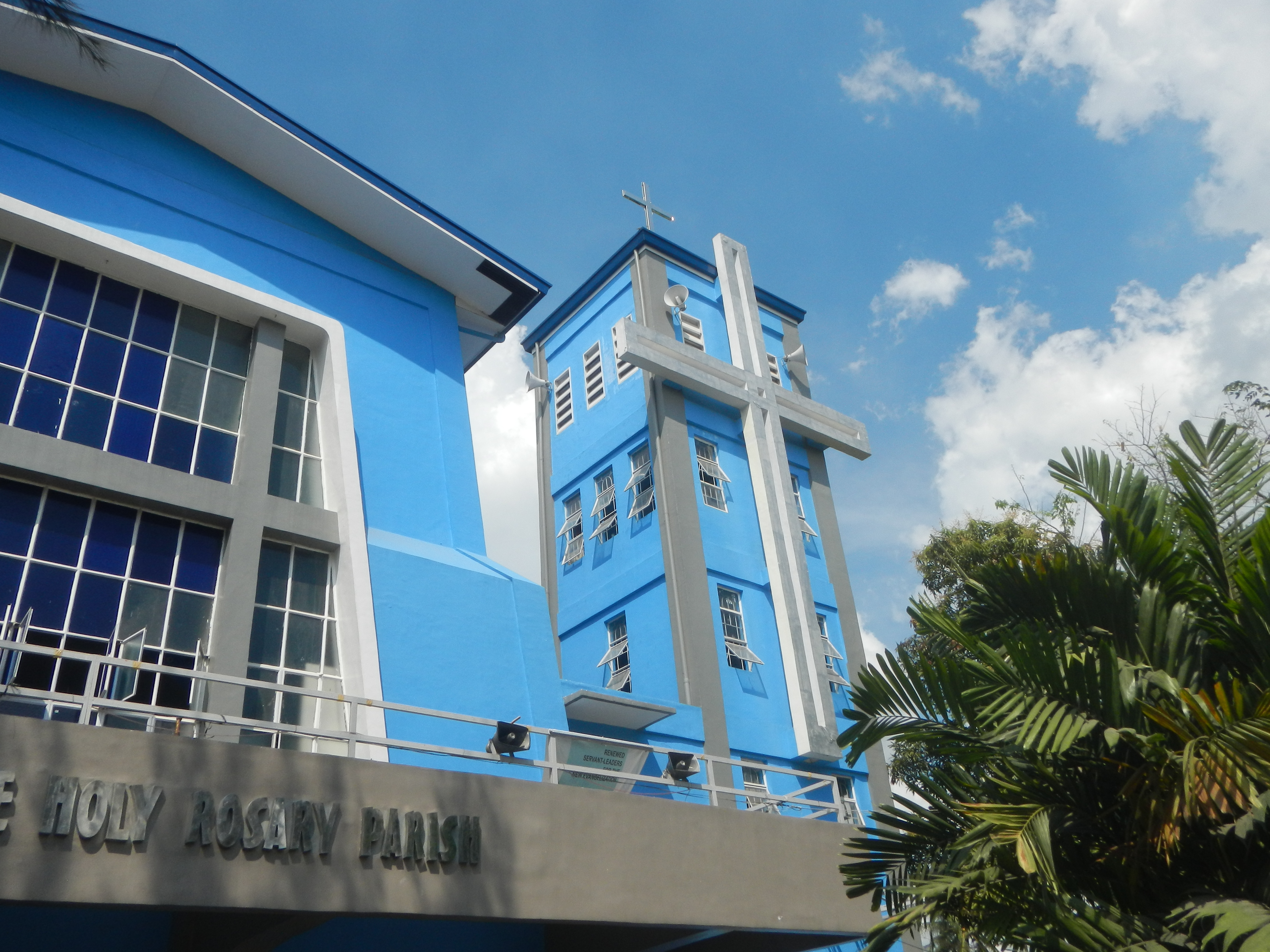
Our Lady of the Holy Rosary Parish Church

== See also ==
- List of parks in Metro Manila
