= Navotas Centennial Park =

Park in Navotas, Philippines

Coordinates: 14°39′2″N 120°56′50″E

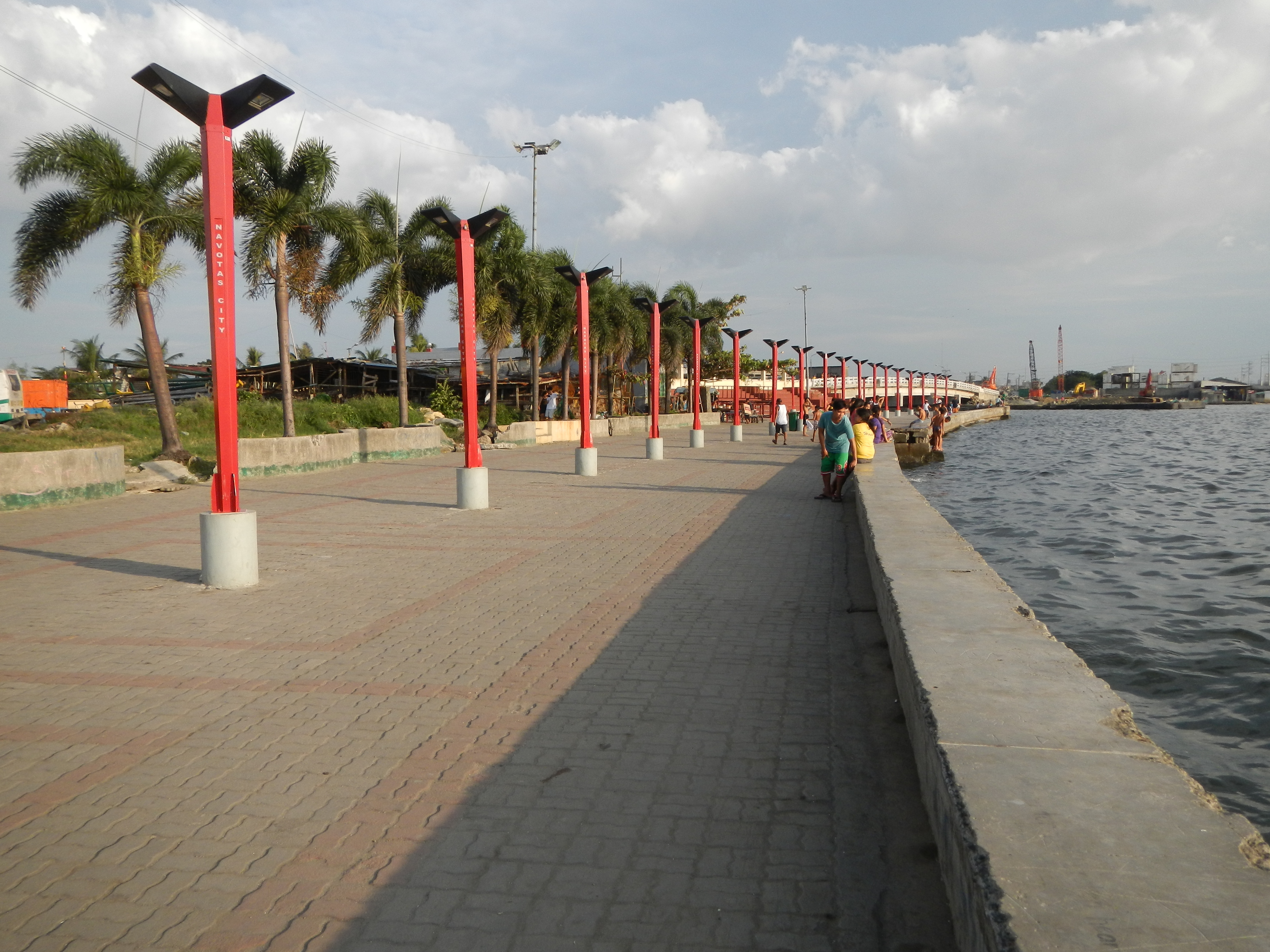
- Interactive map of Navotas Centennial Park
- Type: Urban park
- Location: Navotas, Philippines
- Created: 2006
- Operator: Navotas city government
- Status: Opened
- Public transit: 44 45 46 47 54 Navotas City Terminal

The Navotas Centennial Park is a waterfront park in Navotas, Philippines, facing Manila Bay. It is the largest open space in the city and is Camanava or Northern Manila District's version of the Baywalk. A popular jogging, strolling and skating spot among local residents, the park runs along the waterfront from the R-10 Bridge (also known as Bangkulasi Bridge) to the Navotas Bus Terminal, just off Circumferential Road 4 in Bagumbayan North.

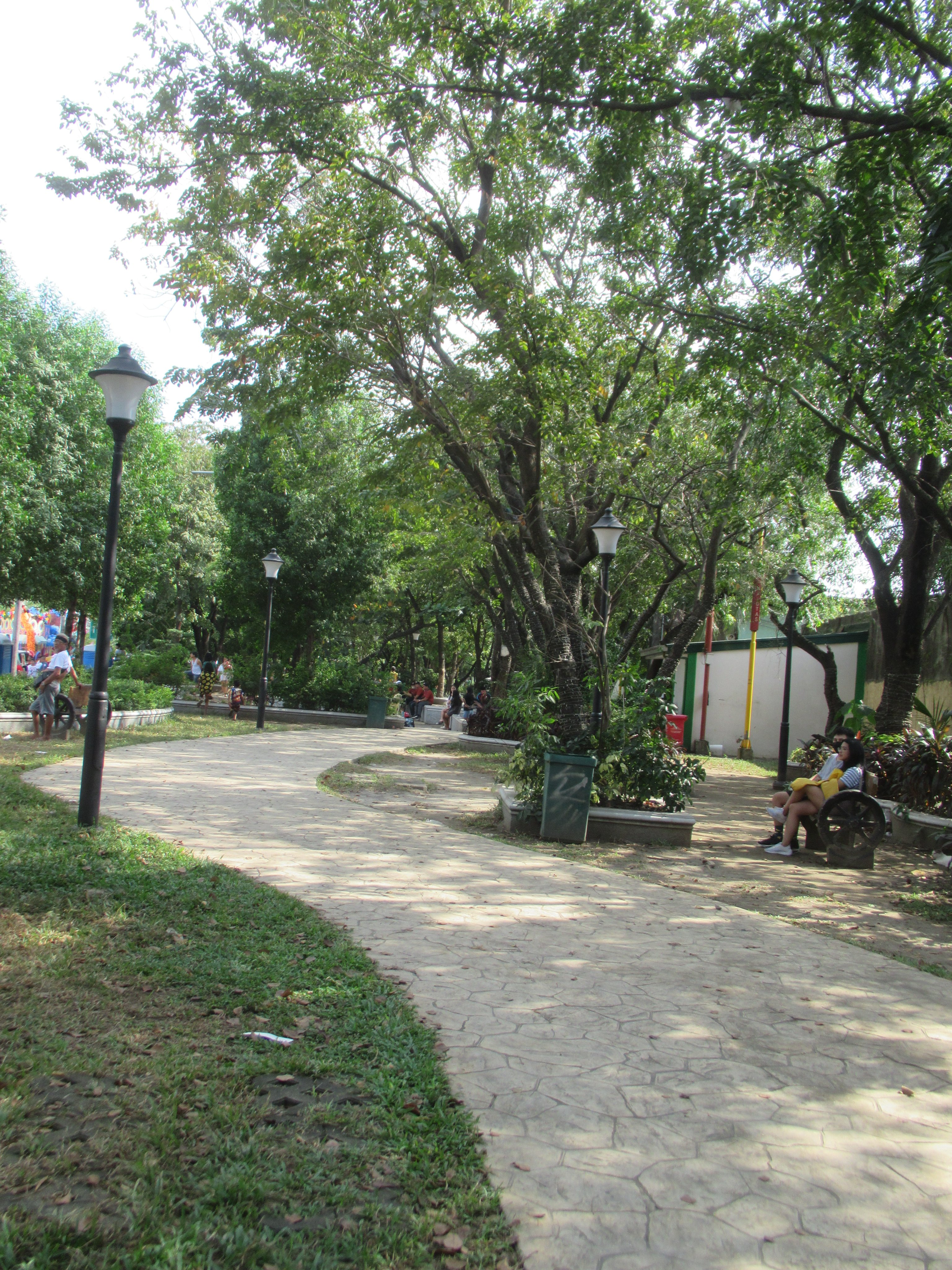
Redevelopment of Park in 2023

The park was opened on January 16, 2006 during the celebration of the 100th Founding Anniversary of the municipality of Navotas. It was built on the site of a former garbage transfer station during the term of Mayor Toby Tiangco who described the project as "garbage turned into gold." The park hosts a variety of activities and local government celebrations throughout the year, including the annual Pangisdaan Festival commemorating the founding anniversary of the "Fishing Capital of the Philippines", and the Bangkang de Sagwan race launched by Mayor John Rey Tiangco in January 2017.

The park is lined with palm trees and lamp posts, and has several bleachers near the park's entrance facing Manila Bay. It also features a two-way ramp and a stock room built in 2014. The park hosts aerobics and taebo sessions on weekends and is also a popular venue for outdoor concerts. In February 2017, the Navotas City Government in partnership with the Metropolitan Manila Development Authority launched a carless weekend program and designated the Navotas Centennial Park as a family zone where residents and visitors can enjoy the outdoors as a community free from pollution and vehicular traffic.

== See also ==
- List of parks in Metro Manila
