= Ninoy Aquino Parks and Wildlife Center =

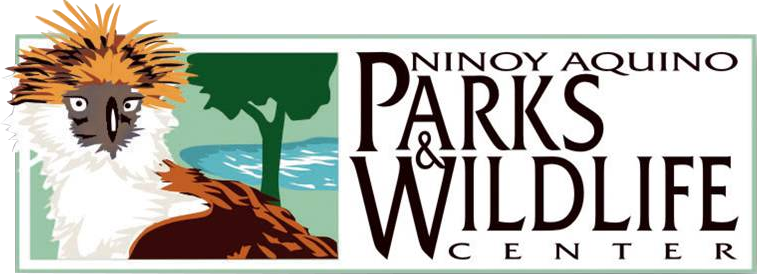

- Entrance to the park
- Interactive map of Ninoy Aquino Parks and Wildlife Center
- 14.6505812°N 121.043908°E
- Date opened: July 5, 1954; 72 years ago
- Location: Diliman, Quezon City, Philippines
- Land area: 23.85 ha (58.9 acres)
- No. of animals: 1,400 (2018)
- Public transit: 5 Lung Center of the Philippines
- Website: bmb.gov.ph/ninoy-aquino-parks-and-wildlife-center/
- Etymology: Benigno Aquino Jr.
- Administrator: Biodiversity Management Bureau
- Visitors: 300,000 (in 2013)
- Species: 4,000 trees

The Ninoy Aquino Parks and Wildlife Center is a 23.85-hectare (58.9-acre) zoological and botanical garden located in Diliman, Quezon City, Philippines. It was named after Benigno "Ninoy" Aquino Jr. The Ninoy Aquino Parks & Wildlife Center has a lagoon, an aquarium, a playground, botanical garden and a Wildlife Rescue Center, which the Department of Environment and Natural Resources uses as a temporary shelter where confiscated, retrieved, donated, sick, abandoned, and injured wild animals are placed to be taken care of. The park houses several indigenous plants and animals such as crab-eating macaques, water monitors, Philippine deer, binturongs, Palawan bearded pigs and several varieties of birds.

== History ==
The history of the Ninoy Aquino Parks and Wildlife Center (NAPWC) can be traced back to 1954, when the Quezon Memorial Park was established through Proclamation No. 42 issued during the administration of President Ramon Magsaysay. The site of the current NAPWC was included inside this park, which originally measured 197.8 hectares (489 acres). The park's area was reduced, first in 1968 to 64.58 hectares (159.6 acres), and then in 1969 to its current size of 23.85 hectares (58.9 acres), with land reallocated for use of the national government and the Philippine Science High School. The NAPWC was opened on July 25, 1970, after it was inaugurated by then-President Ferdinand Marcos. As early as the 1970s, the park also hosted a conventional mini zoo which also served a dual role of depository of wild animals rescued or turned-over to the park by private owners.

In July 1982, the park was temporarily closed for renovation. Among the facilities installed in the park include the amphitheater, craft village cottage, fishing village, comfort rooms, and a water and lighting system. The park was then reopened on February 21, 1983, as the Lungsod ng Kabataan Recreational Park. The current name of the park was a consequence of Ministry of Natural Resources Administrative Order No. 4 which was issued in 1986. The renaming was made to honor Senator Benigno "Ninoy" Aquino Jr. whose assassination in 1983 led to the People Power Revolution of February 1986 which deposed President Marcos and saw the installation of Corazon Aquino as president.

The NAPWC was placed under the administration of the Protected Areas and Wildlife Bureau (now known as the Biodiversity Management Bureau), a staff bureau of the Department of Environment and Natural Resources in 1987 as part of a larger reorganization of the government. On May 25, 2000, under the administration of then President Joseph Estrada, the NAPWC through Proclamation No. 312 was stripped of its status as a protected area and was renamed as the DENR–Wildlife Rescue and Rehabilitation Center. The park was reverted to its previous name on August 21, 2002, through Estrada's successor Gloria Macapagal Arroyo's Proclamation No. 238 which amended the earlier decree which renamed the park.

Arroyo by the virtue of Proclamation No. 723 proclaimed the NAPWC as a protected area and a component of the National Integrated Protected Areas System (NIPAS) Act or the Republic Act No. 7586.

In 2011, the park's mini zoo was converted to a wildlife rescue and research center known as the National Wildlife Rescue and Research Center which remained accessible to the public.

Ninoy Aquino Parks and Wildlife Center was declared a national park under Republic Act No. 11038 (Expanded National Integrated Protected Areas System Act of 2018) signed by President Rodrigo Duterte in July 2018.

== Facilities and attractions ==
=== Lagoon area ===
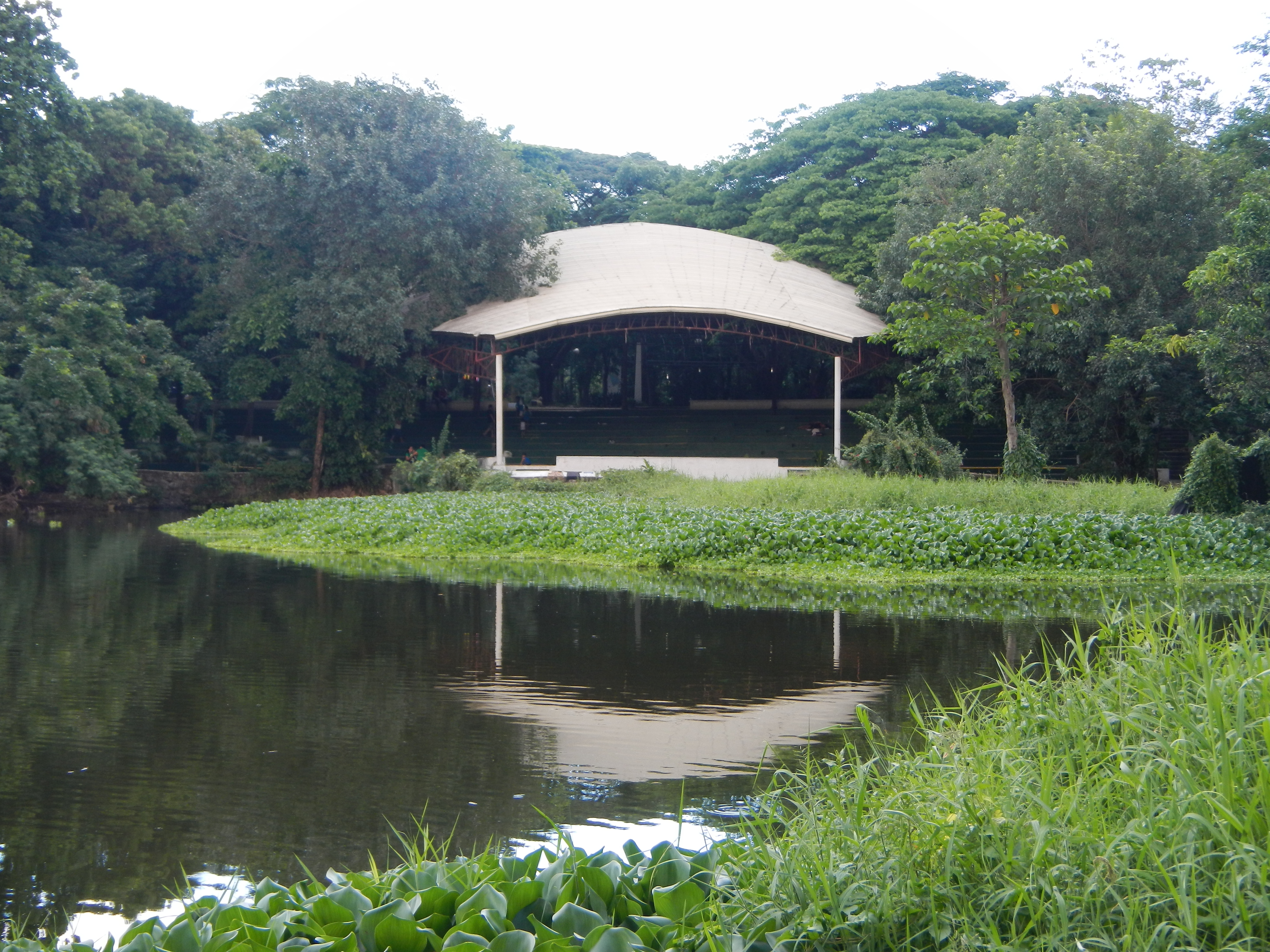
Lagoon and open-air amphitheater within the NAPWC

A manmade lagoon is situated within the grounds of the Ninoy Aquino Parks and Wildlife Center which hosts various fishes including catfish, tilapia, and snakehead. Other facilities can also be found within the immediate vicinity of the lagoon. This includes: the Fishing Village which consists of five houses on stilts situated on water along the edge of the lagoon and is patterned after structures often found in fishing villages in Mindanao and a 500–600 capacity open-air amphitheater.

=== Biodiversity museum ===
A museum, known as the Museum of Philippine Biodiversity, is hosted inside the park. The interactive museum launched in May 2017 features six protected areas featuring both terrestrial and marine ecosystems.

=== Public art ===
Ugnayan, a permanent installation art created by Luis Yee Jr. (Junyee) is located within park grounds. The artwork is made of recycled hardwood pillars and metal and features the cooperation of the 21 member economies of the Asia-Pacific Economic Cooperation

=== Wildlife and research center ===
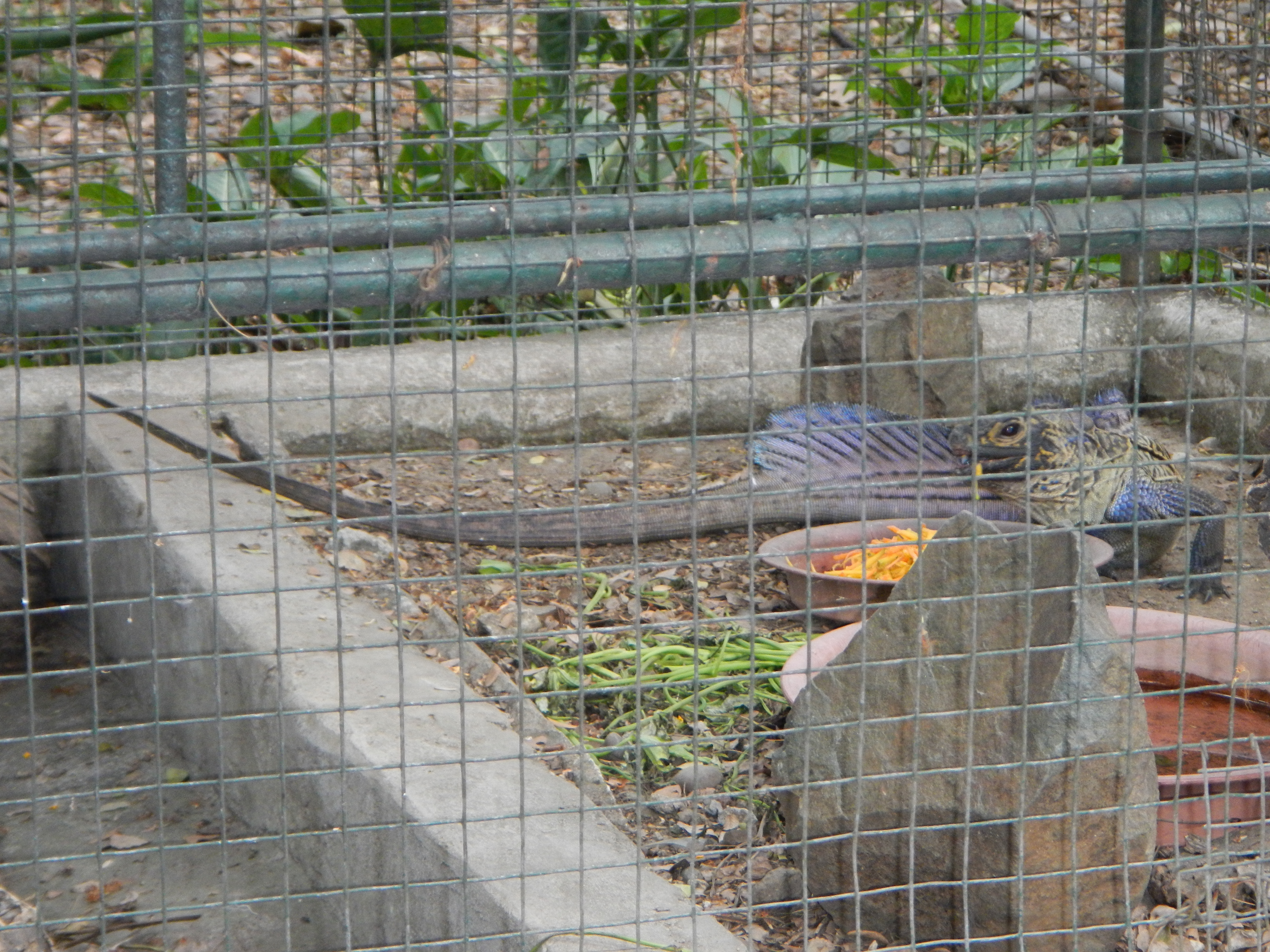
A Philippine sailfin lizard (Hydrosaurus pustulatus)

The NAPWC hosts the National Wildlife Rescue and Research Center (NWRRC) which is officially a wildlife rescue and research center to differentiate its role from a conventional zoo. The facility serves as a quarantine area and rehabilitation center for captured wild animals which were found lingering in residential areas or undomesticated animals confiscated by authorities from traders participating in the illegal wildlife trade or exotic pet owners who were abusive towards their pets or keeping the animals illegally. It also serves as temporary shelter for owners of non-domesticated animals who voluntarily gave custody of their pets to the center. The facility is open to the public where animals which were victims of cruelty from poachers, illegal traders, and irresponsible exotic pet owners are showcased to discourage the growth of the illegal wildlife trade and irresponsible pet ownership. Some endemic animals are displayed to promote awareness on the biodiversity of the Philippines.

The NWRRC is reportedly overcrowded in 2018, hosting around 1,400 individual mammals, birds and reptiles. Among the reasons cited by the park’s management were the inability of the animals to adapt back to the wild due to prolonged domestication and pending court cases involving the animals.

== Flora ==
In 2009 it was reported that the Ninoy Aquino Parks and Wildlife Center hosts around 4,000 species of trees, 100 of which are endemic to the Philippines. Among the trees found in the park are ipil, kamagong, narra, and molave. The Philippine Native Plants Conservation Society estimated that there were a total of 4,500 mature trees inside the Ninoy Aquino Parks and Wildlife Center in 2012.

== Gallery ==
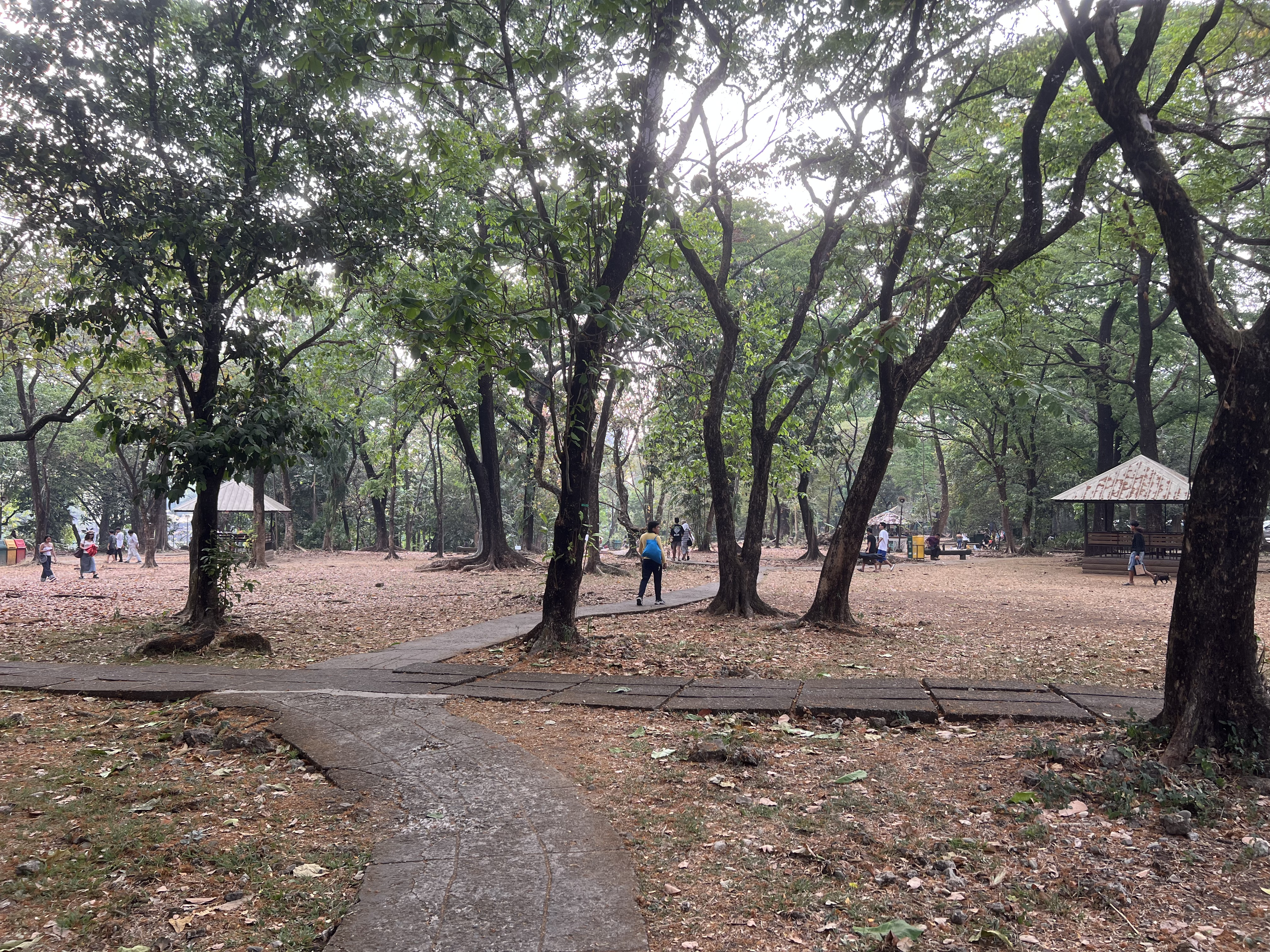
Pathways within the center

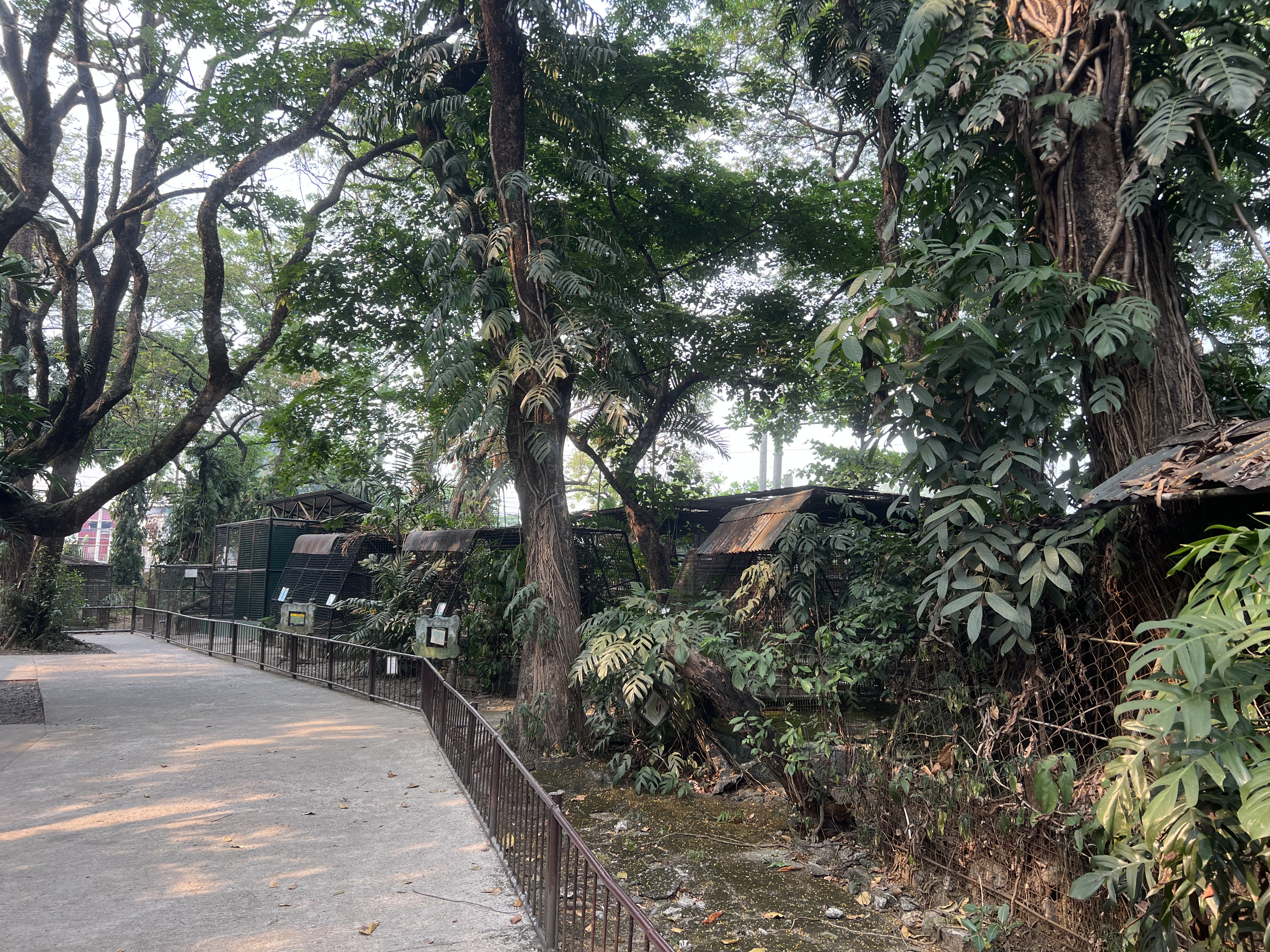
Wildlife Rescue Center

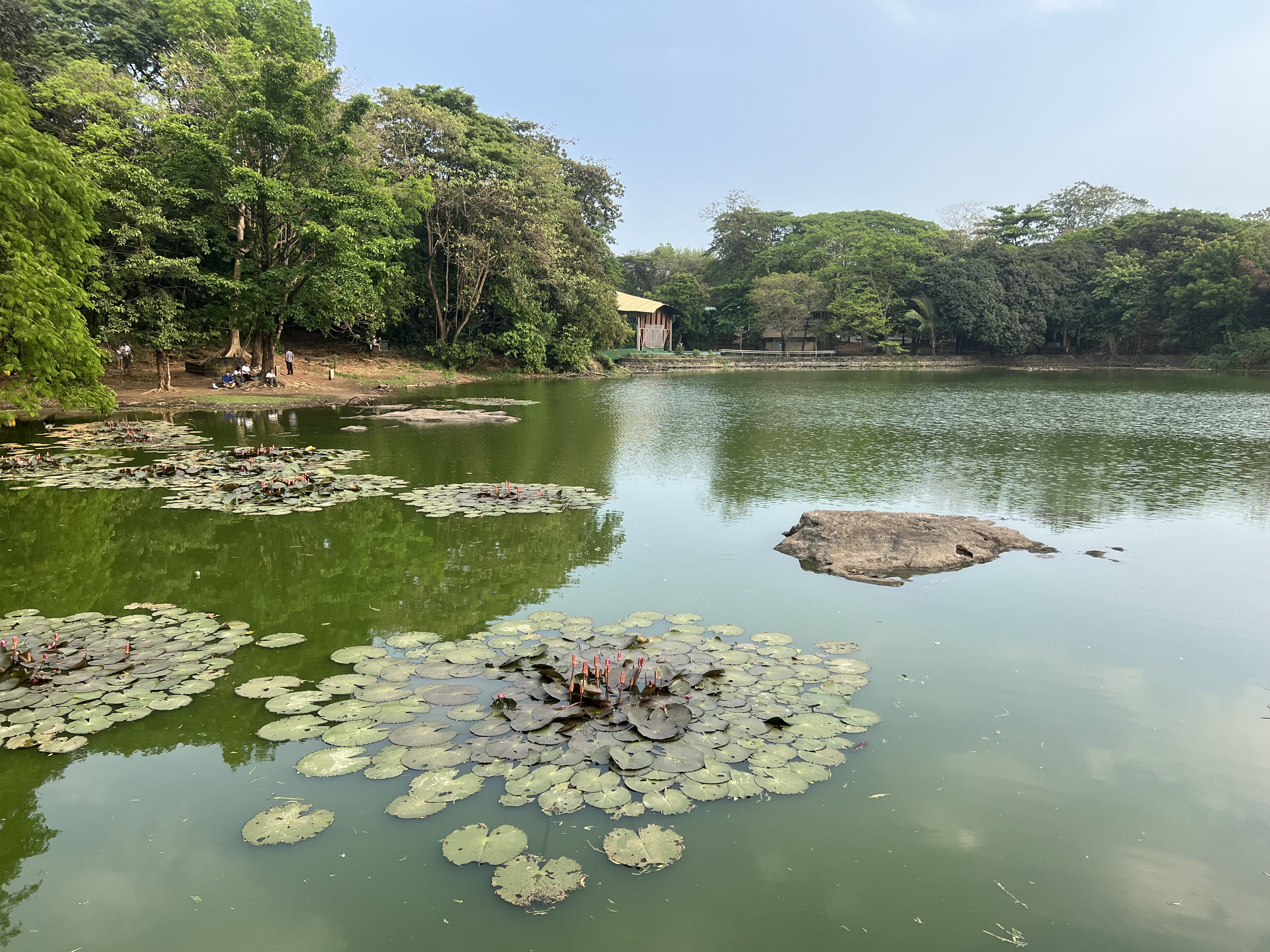
Lagoon

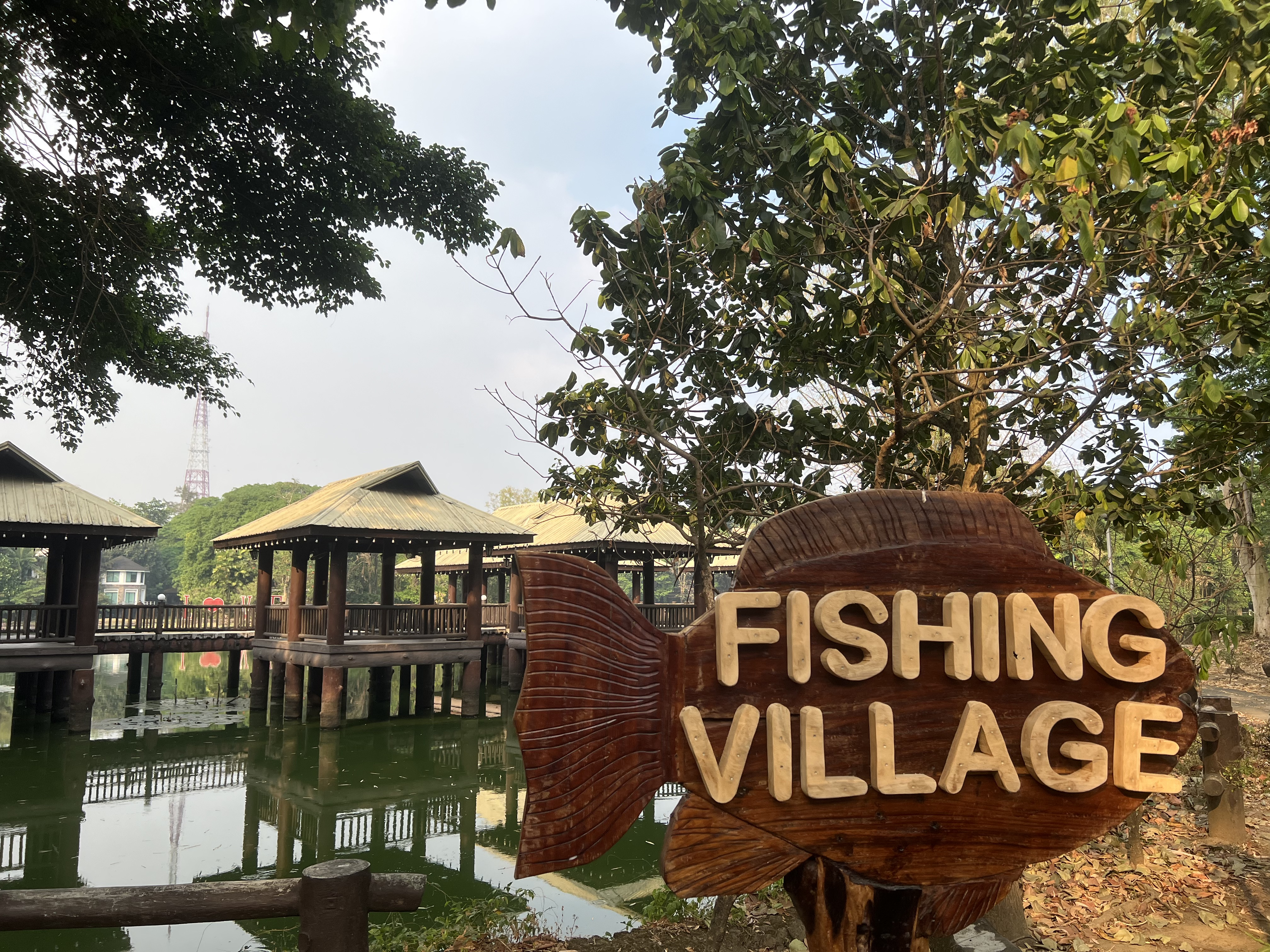
Fishing Village

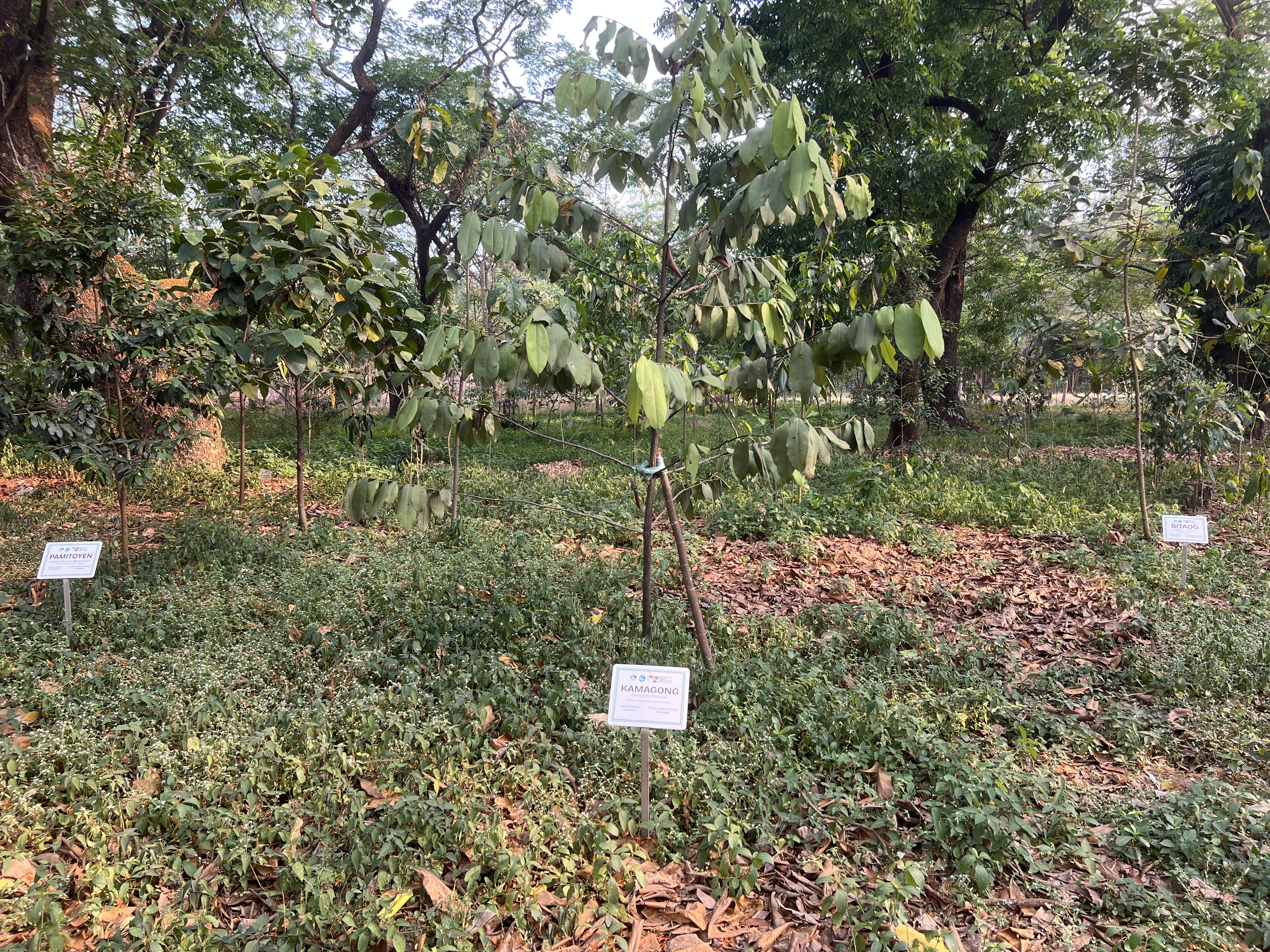
Arboretum of Philippine Native Trees

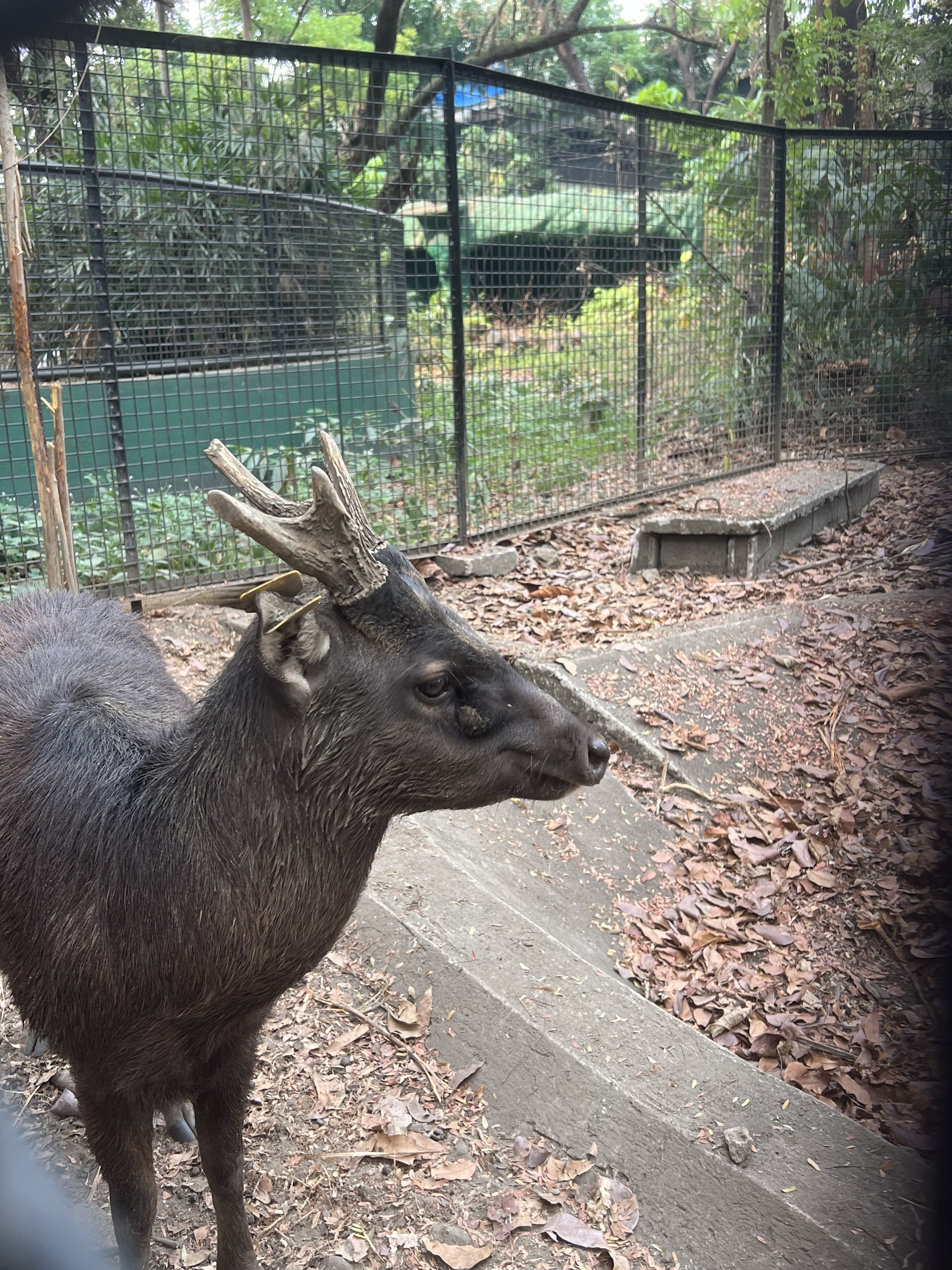
Philippine deer (Rusa marianna)

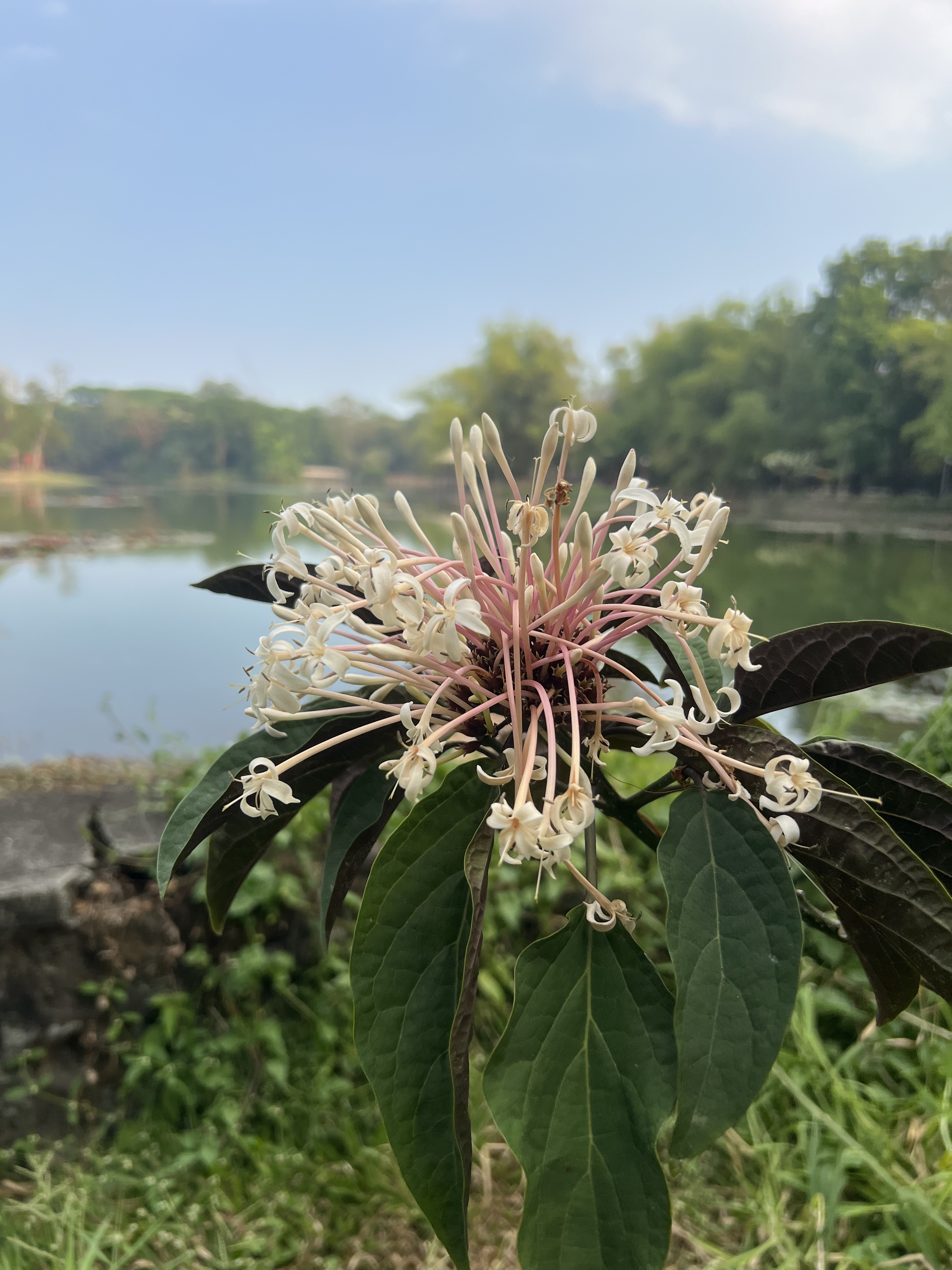
Bagawak-Morado (Clerodendrum quadriloculare) near the lagoon

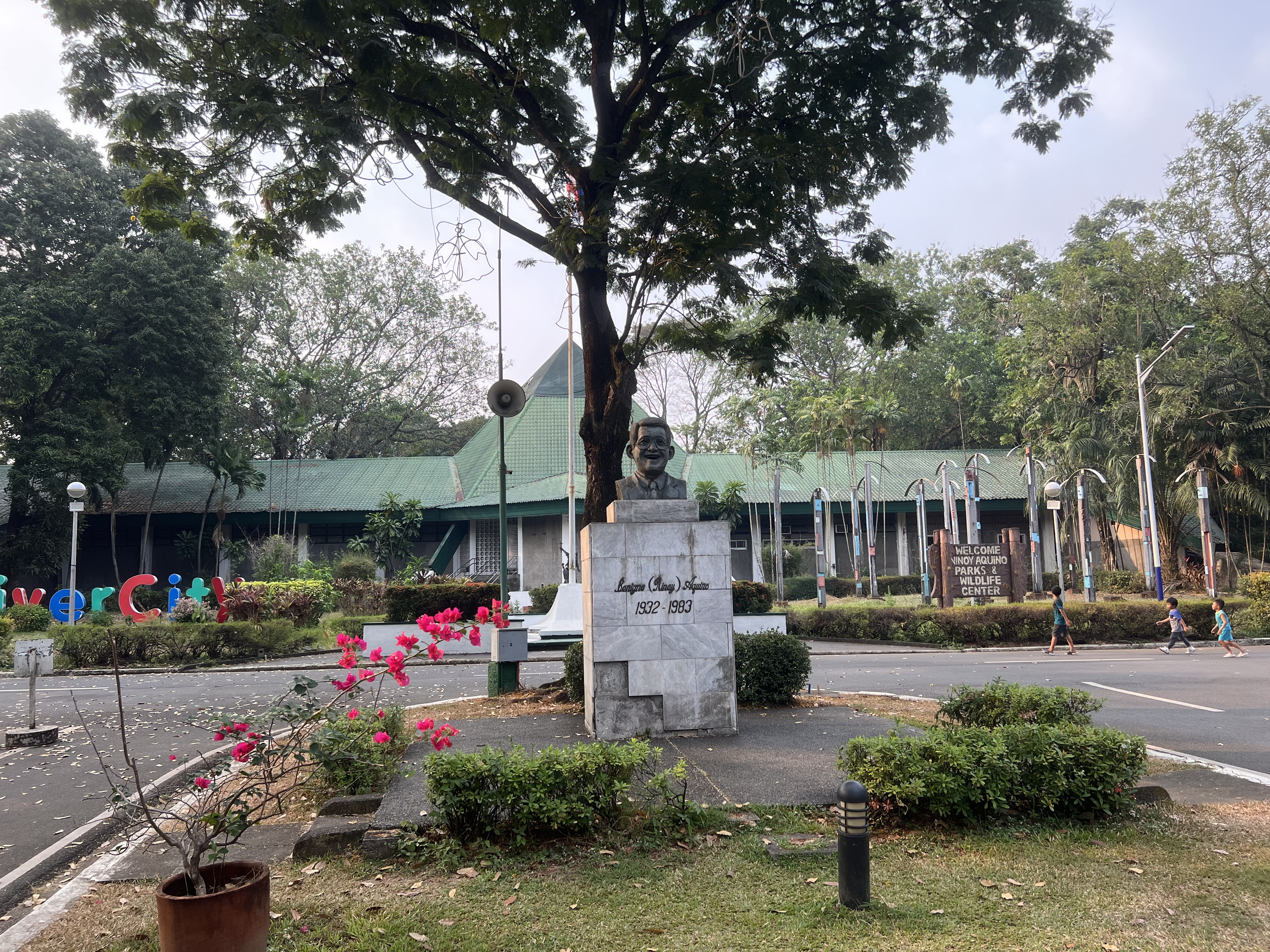
Bust of Ninoy Aquino in front of the flagpole area

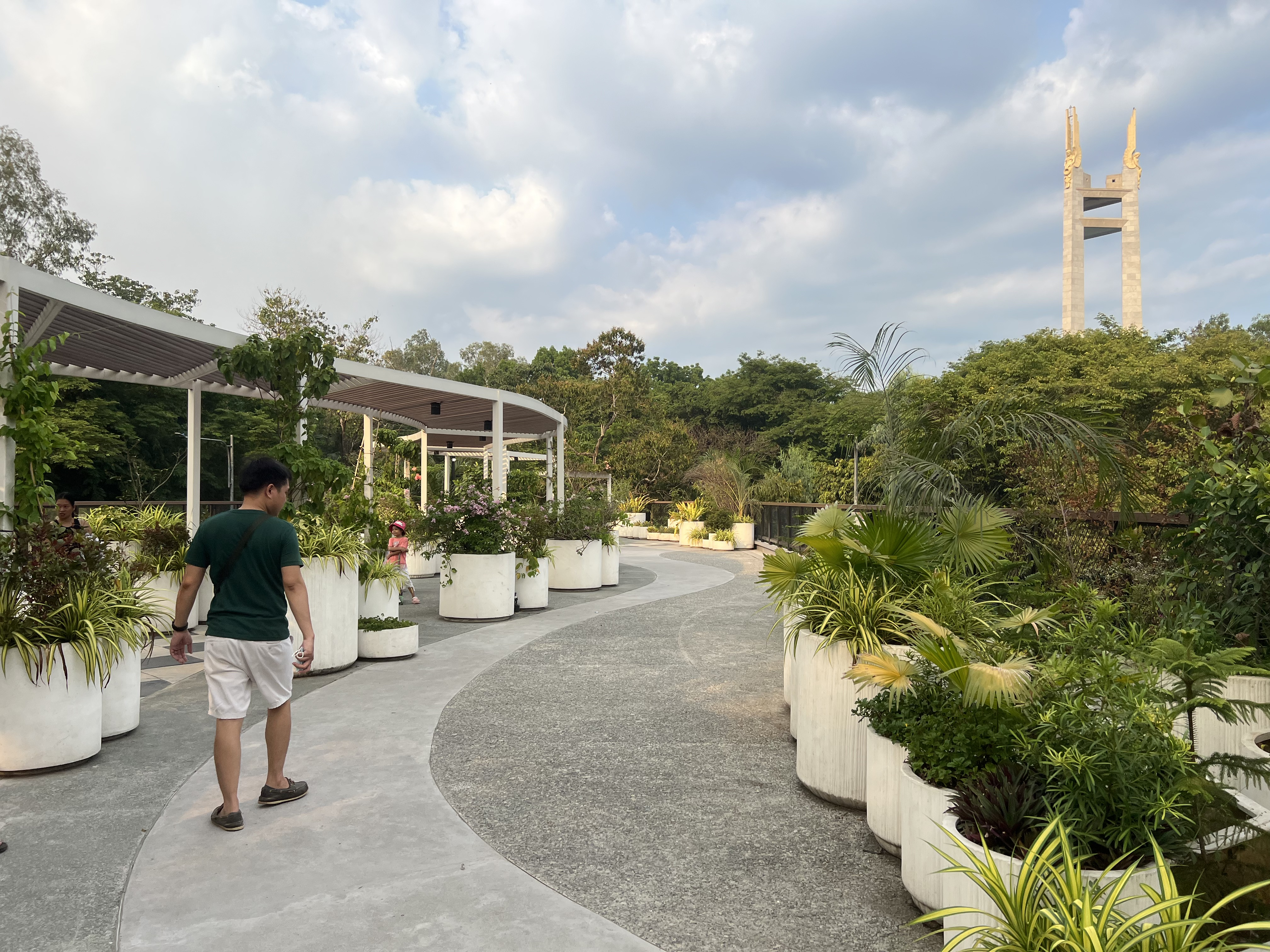
Elevated promenade outside the NAPWC connecting to the Quezon Memorial Circle

== See also ==
- List of parks in Manila
