= José Manuel Rodríguez =

José Manuel Rodríguez may refer to:

- José Manuel Rodríguez (athlete) (born 1966), Spanish athlete
- Jose Manuel Rodríguez (baseball) (born 1982), Mexican baseball player
- José Manuel Rodríguez (boccia) (born 1980), Spanish boccia player
- Jose Manuel Rodriguez Benito (born 1992), Spanish football player
- José Manuel Rodríguez Cuadros, Peruvian diplomat
- José Manuel Rodríguez Delgado (1915–2011), Spanish professor of neurophysiology
- José Manuel Rodríguez Morgade (born 1984), Spanish football player
- José Manuel Rodríguez Uribes (born 1968), Spanish philosopher

== See also ==
- José Rodríguez (disambiguation)
