= Makati Poblacion Park =

Park in Makati, Philippines

Coordinates: 14°34′3″N 121°1′59″E

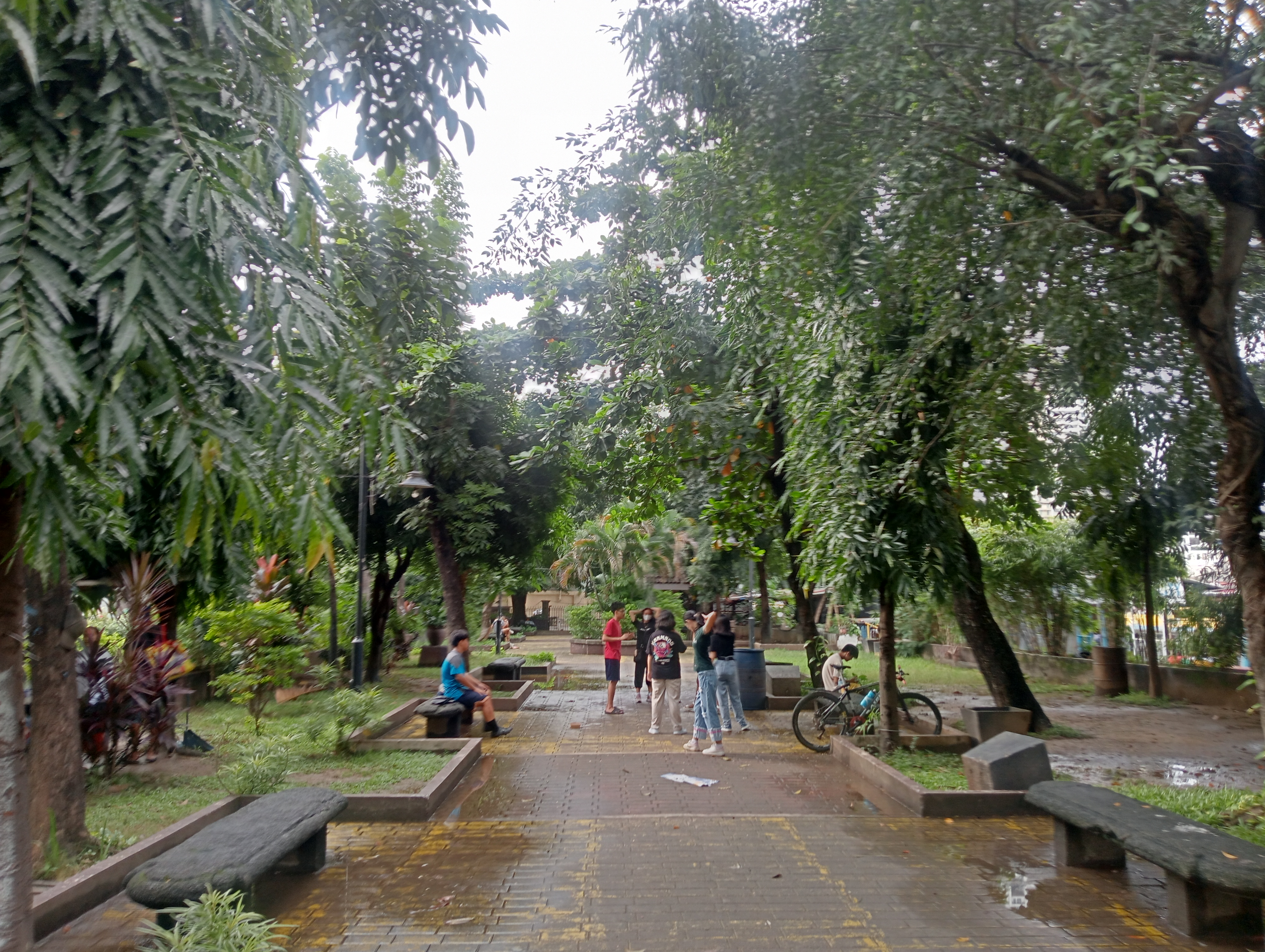
- Interactive map of Makati Poblacion Park
- Type: Urban park
- Location: Makati, Philippines
- Area: 0.2876 hectares (0.711 acres)
- Operator: Department of Environmental Services Parks and Green Division (Makati city government)
- Status: Opened

The Makati Poblacion Park, often shortened to Poblacion Park, is an urban linear park along the south bank of the Pasig River in Makati, Metro Manila, Philippines.

It is the largest of three public parks in Makati's old downtown area situated at the site of the Casa Hacienda, a former plantation house. It is operated by the Department of Environmental Services Parks and Green Division of the City Government of Makati. Together with the Makati Poblacion Linear Park, the park has revitalized around 0.25 kilometers (0.16 mi) of Makati Poblacion's waterfront between the Makati–Mandaluyong Bridge and Rockwell Center.

== Description ==
The Makati Poblacion Park is 2,876 square meters (30,960 ft^{2}) in size and stretches along the Pasig River from Zamora Street by the Poblacion Covered Court and ends up across from the Poblacion Fire Sub-Station. The roughly three-block riverside park bordered by J. P. Rizal Avenue to the south sits in the historic Heritage District of Makati located just across from the Museo ng Makati. This neo-classical building with oyster shell window shutters built in 1918 at a plaza known as Plaza Trece de Agosto (now an extension of J.P. Rizal Avenue) served as Makati's presidencia or municipal hall until 1961. The San Pedro Macati Church stands about 300 meters (980 ft) to the south at the opposite end of D.M. Rivera Street (formerly Don Pedro P. Roxas Street) at another plaza known as Plaza Cristo Rey. The park is also near the barangay hall of Poblacion.

Poblacion Park features an amphitheater, children's playground, stone benches, gazeboes, multipurpose sheds and solar lamp posts. The adjacent Poblacion Covered Court is a basketball court that also serves as a venue for local gatherings. A 75-meter (246 ft) extension of the park eastwards to Rockwell Center was inaugurated in June 2016 by the then-acting Mayor Romulo Peña. This extension called Poblacion Linear Park and designated as an Environmental Preservation Area was built by the Pasig River Rehabilitation Commission on more than 3 meters of existing easement along the Pasig River at a cost of ₱4.5 million.

== History ==
The land for the park was acquired by the city of Makati after World War II as a donation from Ayala y Compañía. It was the site of a large bahay na bato that served as an administrative building for the then vast Jesuit hacienda of San Pedro de Macati. Ownership of the estate was transferred several times after the Jesuits were expelled from the Philippines in the late 18th century. It passed on to the Marquess of Villamediana, Don José Col, Don Manuel Gómez, and then to Don Simeón Bernardino Vélez. It was in 1851 when Don José Bonifacio Roxas purchased it for 50,000 Spanish dollars and made it the commercial base of Casa Roxas, the precursor of Ayala y Compañía (now Ayala Corporation).

The casa hacienda was located in the then village of Buenavista that sat on an elevated plateau overlooking the Pasig River. It was accessible from the river via stone steps or hagdang bato located just beside the plantation house. The Zobel de Ayala family managed their estate here from their headquarters at the casa hacienda until post-independence when the house was demolished and the site turned into an open space.

== Gallery ==
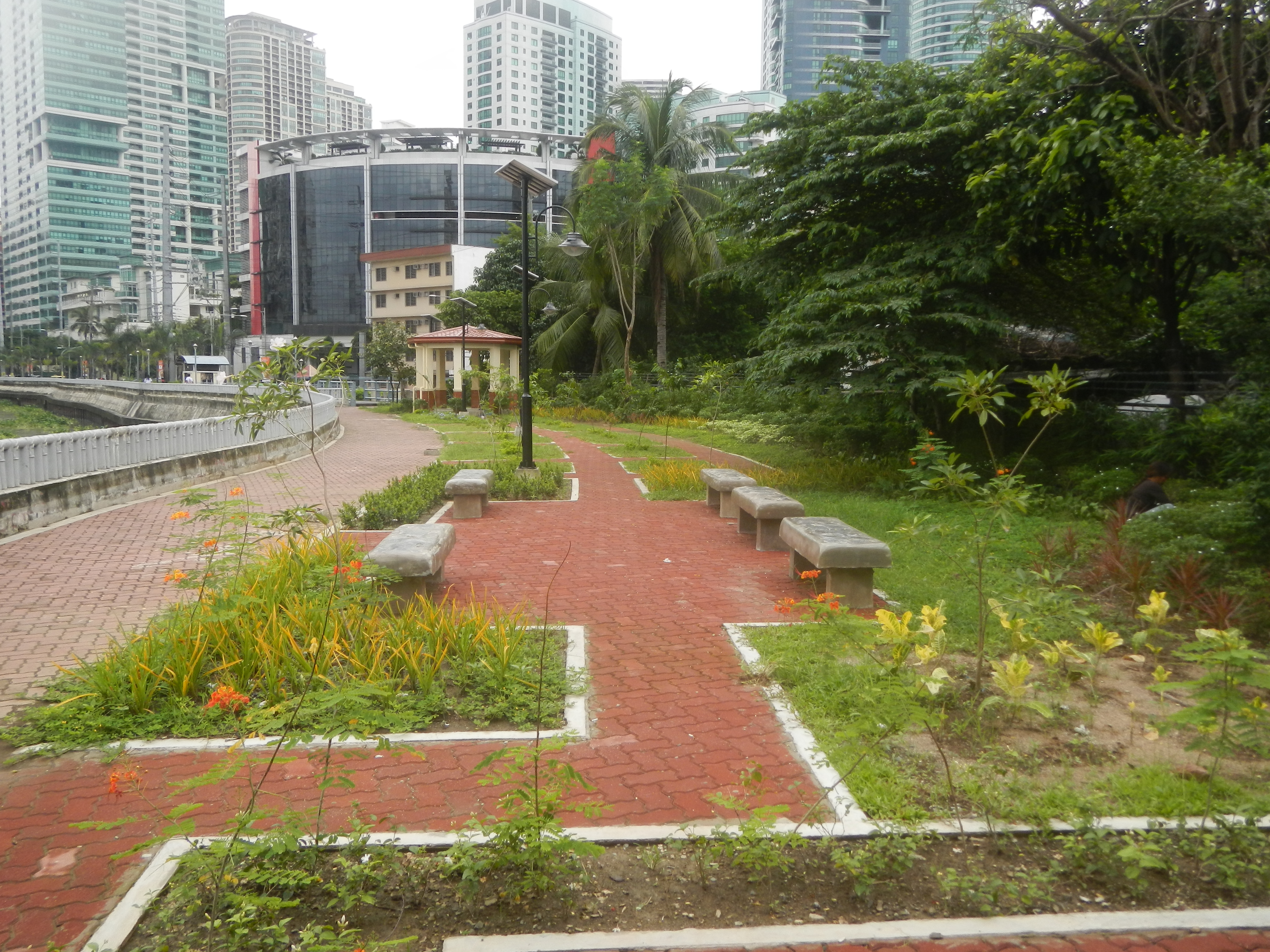
Poblacion Park with Rockwell Center in the background

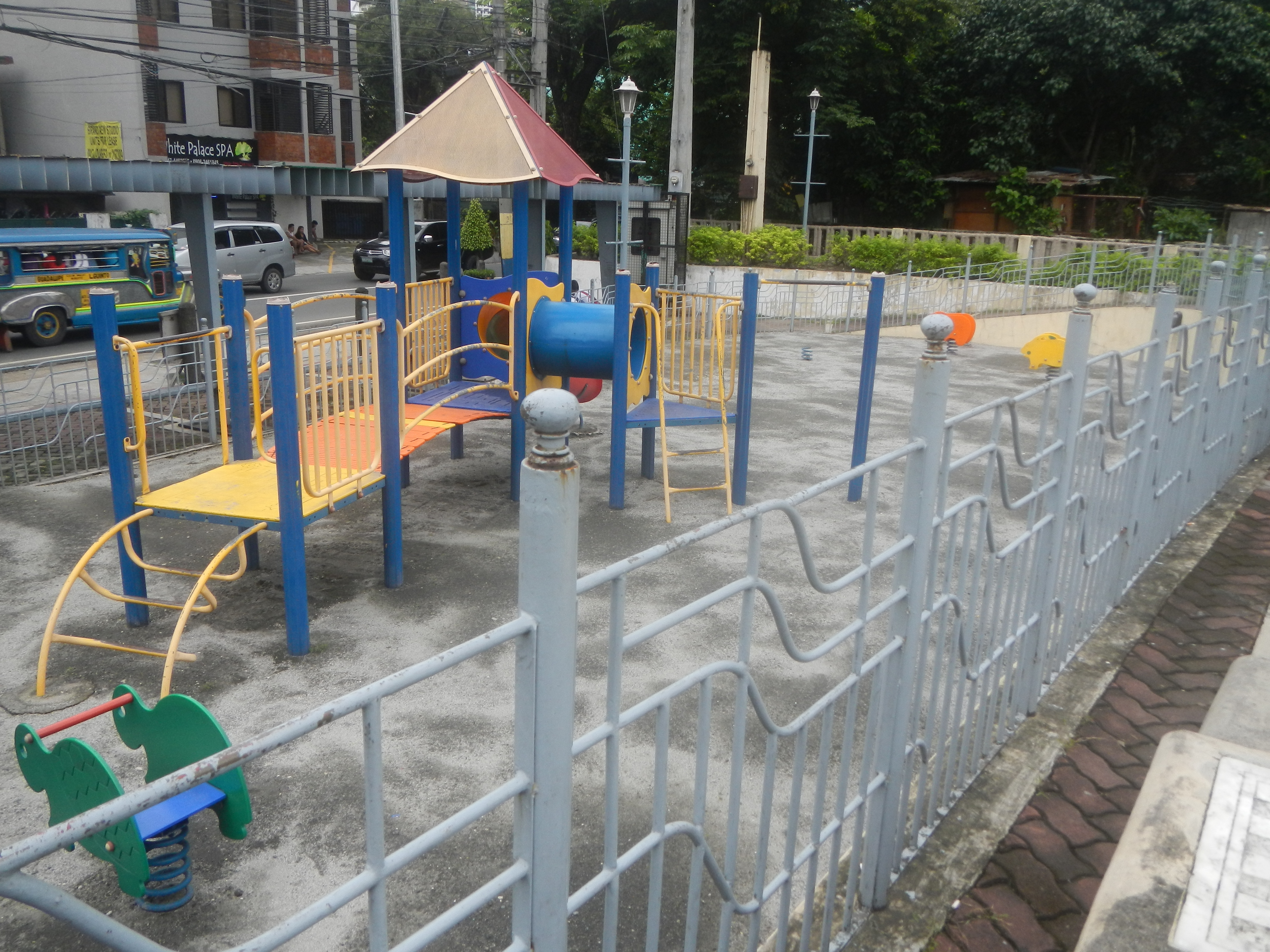
A children's playground at Poblacion Park

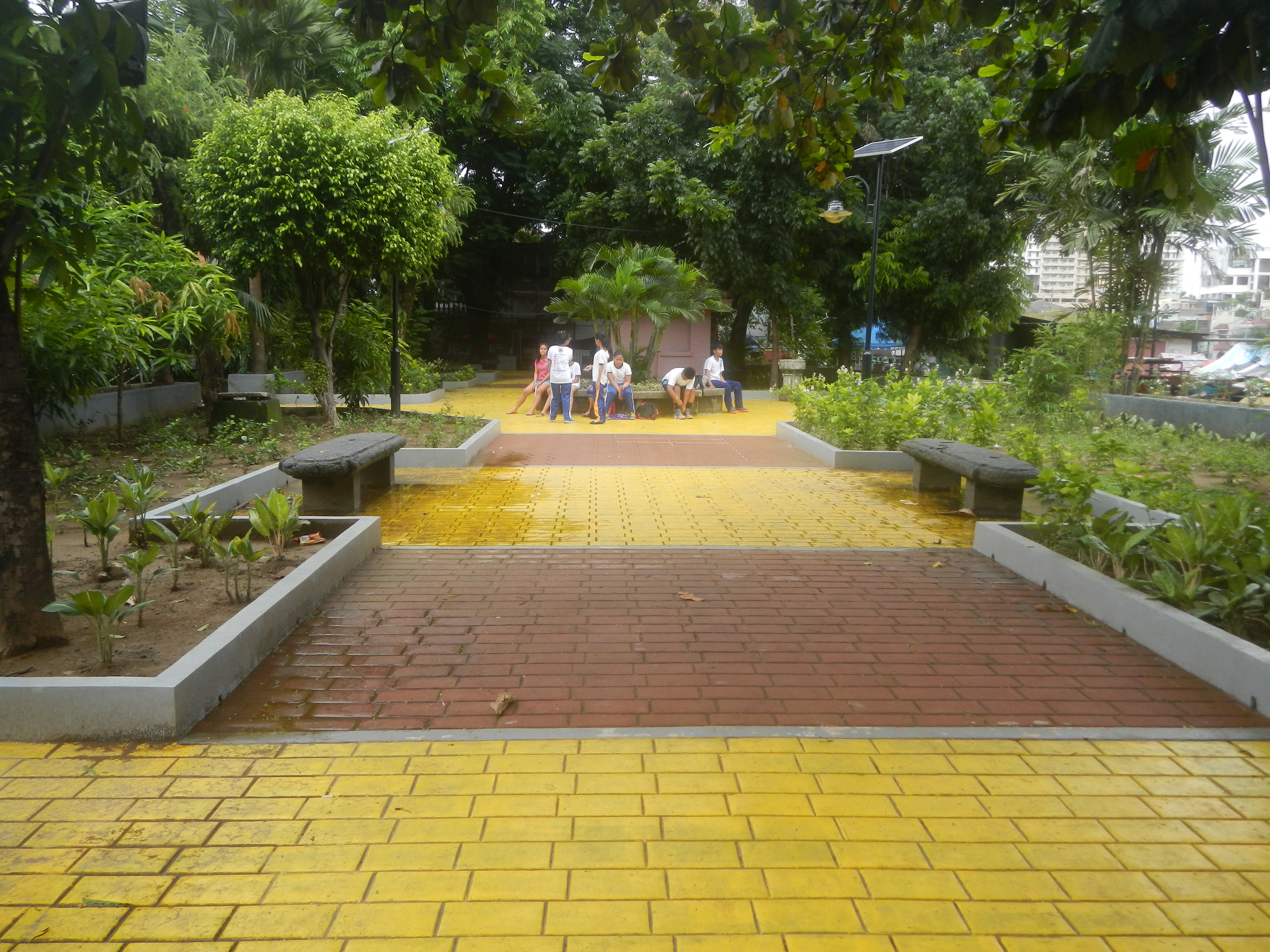
Painted tiled walkway

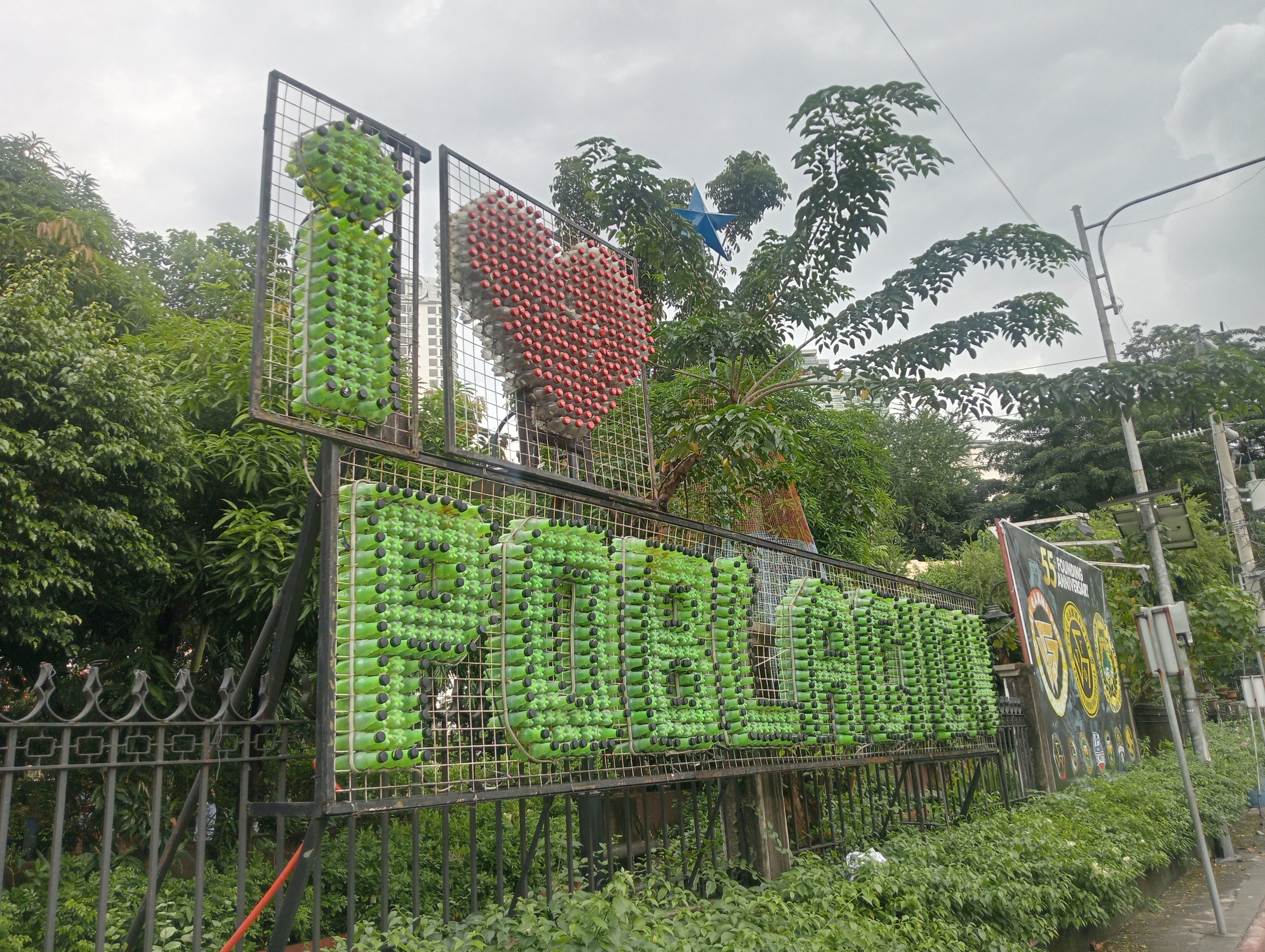
"I Love Poblacion" sign at Poblacion Park

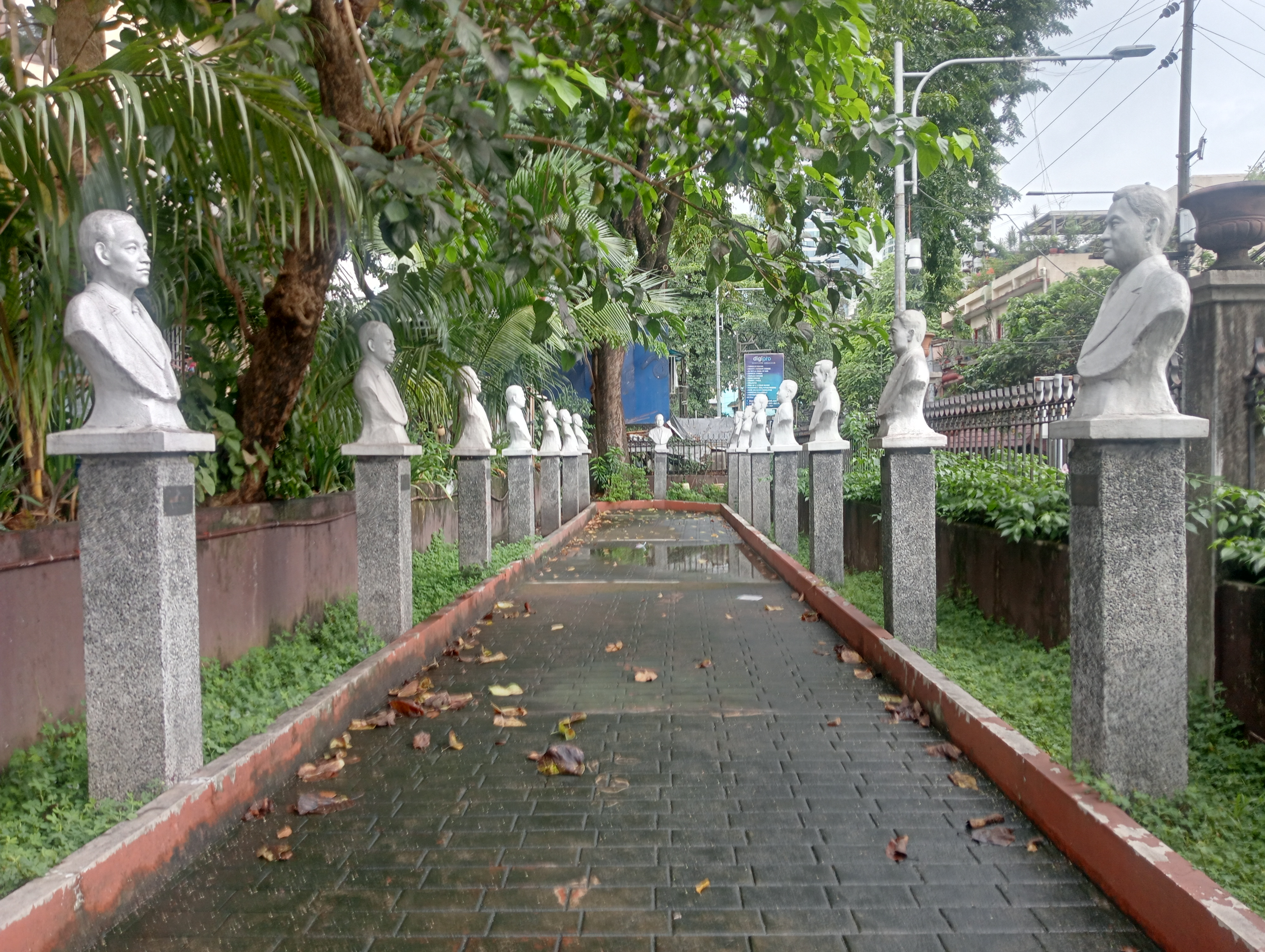
Makati Mayors Lane

== See also ==
- List of parks in Metro Manila
