= José María Rodríguez y Cos =

Mexican writer (1823–1899)

José María Rodríguez y Cos (1823-1899) was a Mexican writer who promoted Positivism in the country. He was born in Tulancingo, Hidalgo, Mexico in 1823, and although he began his studied to be a doctor, he had to leave university due to finances. He worked as a teacher and began to write, and became associated with Positivist writers such as Vicente Hugo Alcaráz and Manuel Guillén. His master work is considered to be epic poem El Anáhuac, published in 1852. Another popular poem is La Revolución francesa. He also wrote plays such as the opera Cuauhtémoc and translated a number of plays and other works from French and Italian into Spanish. Rodríguez y Cos died in Mexico City in 1899.
