= TLC Park =

Urban park in Taguig, Philippines

Coordinates: 14°29′28″N 121°3′50″E

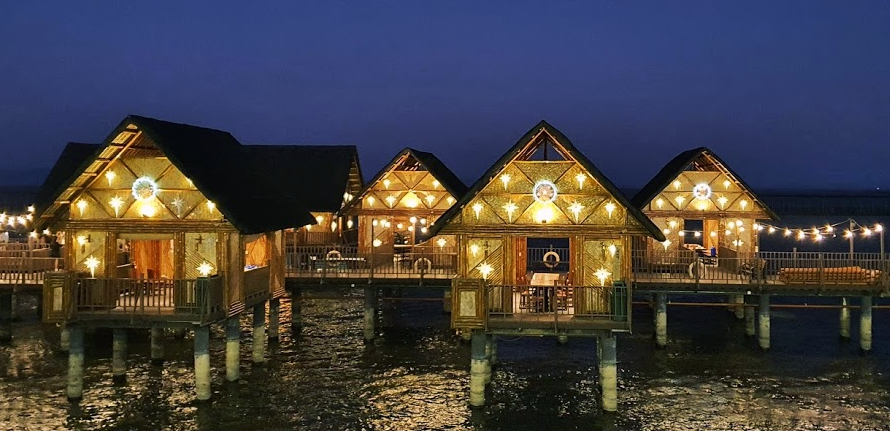
- Mercado de Lago in TLC Park
- Interactive map of TLC Park
- Type: Urban park
- Location: Eastern coast of Taguig
- Area: 1 hectare (10,000 m^{2})
- Opened: December 2, 2014
- Owner: City of Taguig
- Administrator: Taguig City Parks & Recreation Office
- Status: Open
- Website: tlcpark.taguig.info

The Taguig Lakefront Community Park, popularly known as the TLC Park, is a park located at the eastern coast of Taguig, Philippines. The park stretches along the eastern coast of C-6 Road in barangays Lower Bicutan and New Lower Bicutan, facing Laguna de Bay. It is also known as Lakeshore. The site of the park was a former dumpsite before the park's inauguration in 2014.

== Facilities ==
The park has a koi pond, an outdoor basketball court, and an activity area.

=== Mercado del Lago ===
The Mercado del Lago is the first floating food court in Metro Manila. It has an area of 5,000 square metres (0.50 ha) and contains a nipa hut floating restaurant, specialized food stalls and a common dining area with 500 seating capacity, an outdoor cinema, a children's playground, a souvenir shop, and an area for recreational activities which include fishing, boating, jogging, biking, skating, and wall climbing.

=== TLC Playpark ===
The TLC Playpark is a 3,000 square meter playpark that features play structures such as the giant slide, pirate ship, eagle climber, play mantis, fish bone equipment, web climber, giraffe play equipment, swing tree and sunflower swing, bird and lovers seesaws, musical instruments, and even food merchants.

=== TLC Village ===
The TLC Village at the park hosts a variety themed events annually such as Love at the Park (every Valentine's Day), The Life of Christ (every Holy Week), and the Christmas by the Lake (Christmas season).

== Activities ==
=== Recreation ===
The Mercado del Lago has a recreational area with activities for fishing, boating, jogging, biking, skating, and wall climbing.

=== Concerts and performances ===
TLC Park has been the site of a lot of concerts in the city. The Taguig Music Festival was first held in April 2024 in TLC Park. In 2025, to celebrate Valentine's Day, the TLC Heart Beats was held at the concert grounds of the park, with live performances from local artists within the city.
