= Jose Rodriguez (activist) =

American activist (born 1952)

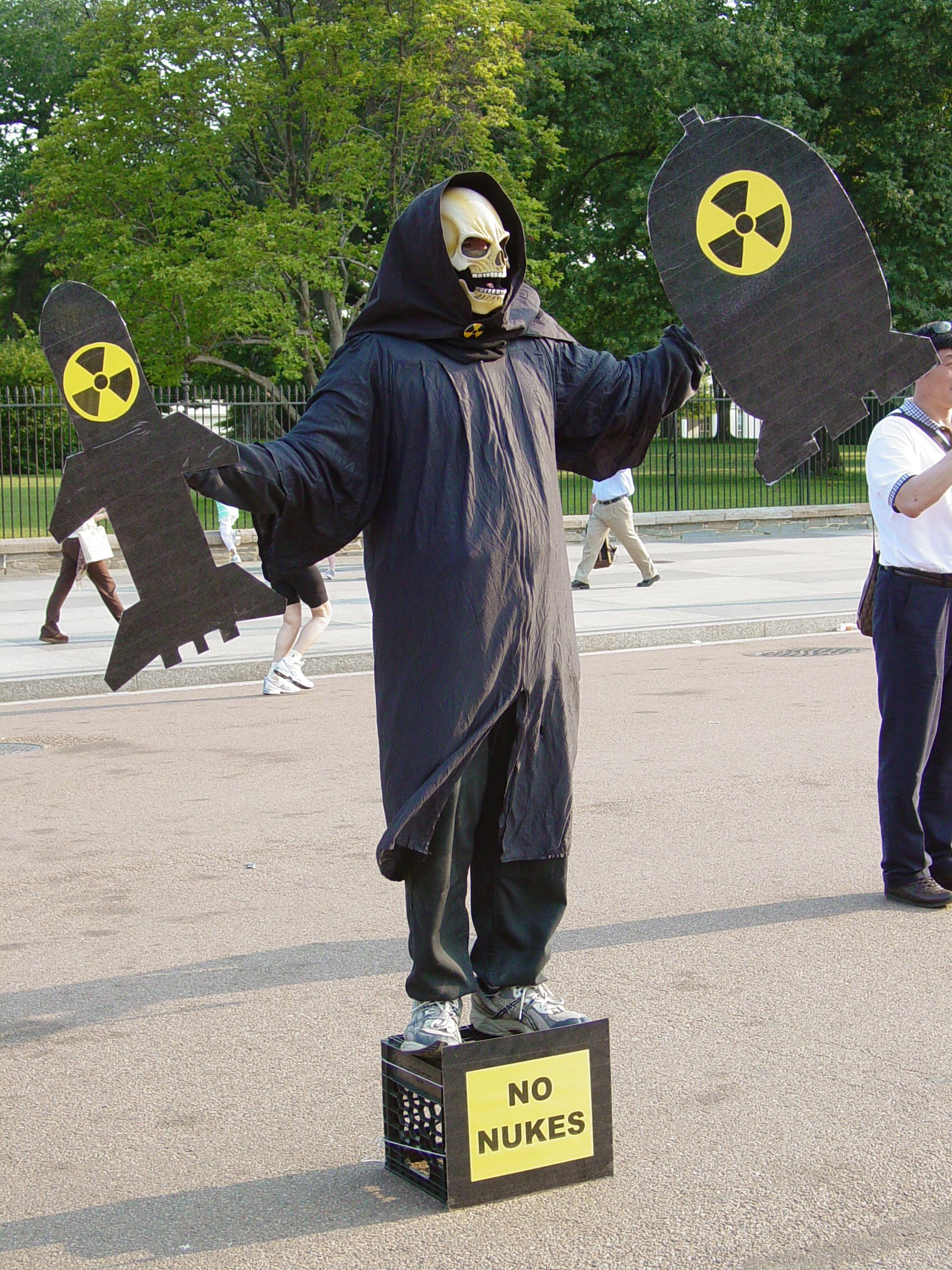
Jose Rodriguez dressed in "Nuclear Death" costume, at DC Anti-War Network (DAWN)'s "No Armageddon For Bush" rally.

Jose Rodriguez is an American political activist. He was born in the Panama Canal Zone in 1952 and was naturalized as a child because of his father's long career in the U.S. Air Force. Getting drafted for Vietnam changed his pro-war attitudes. As the war wound down, he spent four years in the Air Force, stationed outside of Los Angeles.

Rodriguez then moved to Virginia, enrolled in George Mason University and became involved in the anti-nuclear movement, the beginning of a career as an activist. He worked on the 1984 campaigns of Alan Cranston, Gary Hart and Walter Mondale. He did press advance for Joan Mondale.

Rodriguez went on to become associate director of the political action committee of the Nuclear Weapons Freeze Campaign. He then joined the 1986 Great Peace March, traveling on the road and working in the Washington D.C. office.

While continuing to organize protests and rallies, in the late 1980s he started selling T-shirts and buttons at street fairs, music concerts and political rallies, using many of his own designs. During the early 1990s he opened his Politically Correct Clothing store at three locations in Washington, DC. News stories about his efforts, accompanied by photographs, have run in The Washington Post and the Dallas Morning News.

From 1991 to 1993 Rodriguez hosted the Politically Correct Cooking show on Fairfax Public Access cable TV channel Ten. In 1993 the show won the Hometown Award for best Informational Series sponsored by the Alliance for Community Media.
