= Jose Policarpo Rodriguez =

José Policarpo Rodríguez was a surveyor, scout, and Methodist preacher in Bandera, Texas. He was born in Zaragoza, Coahuila, Mexico on January 26, 1829 and died in Poteet, Texas on March 22, 1914.
