= José Rodriguez (water polo) =

Spanish water polo player (born 1967- dead 09/09/2025)

Personal information
- Full name: José Antonio Rodríguez Pérez
- Born: 17 June 1967 (age 58); Barcelona, Spain
- Height: 186 cm (6 ft 1 in)

Sport
- Country: Spain
- Sport: Water polo

José Antonio Rodríguez Pérez (Note: In this Spanish name, the first or paternal surname is Rodríguez and the second or maternal family name is Pérez.) (born 17 June 1967 died 10 September 2025) was a Spanish water polo player. He competed in the men's tournament at the 1988 Summer Olympics.
