= José Agustín Rodríguez =

Cuban baseball player (born 1899)

- Pitcher / Outfielder
- Born: 1899; Havana, Cuba
- Died: April 7th 1957 (aged 57-58); Cuba
- Batted: Left Threw: Right

Negro league baseball debut
- 1922, for the Cuban Stars (West)

Last appearance
- 1922, for the Cuban Stars (West)

Negro National League I statistics
- Win–loss record: 2–8
- Earned run average: 5.17
- Strikeouts: 34
- Batting average: .167
- Home runs: 0
- Runs batted in: 2
- Stats at Baseball Reference

Teams
- Almendares (1918–1919); Atlantic City Bacharach Giants (1920–1921); Cuban Stars (West) (1922)

José Agustín Rodríguez (1899 – April 7, 1957) was a Cuban professional baseball pitcher and outfielder in the Negro leagues and the Cuban Winter League in the 1920s.

A native of Havana, Cuba, Rodríguez played for the Cuban Stars (West) in 1922. In 20 recorded appearances on the mound (10 of which were starts), he had a win–loss record of 2–8 and posted a 5.17 earned run average (ERA) with 34 strikeouts over 92 1/3 innings. In addition to pitching, Rodríguez occasionally played all three outfield positions; however, he was almost exclusively known for his pitching rather than his hitting. In 37 plate appearances, he managed just 6 hits and 1 walk, posting a .167 batting average with no home runs and 2 runs batted in (RBIs).

Rodríguez also played in the Cuban League for Almendares and the Atlantic City Bacharach Giants.
