= José N. Rodríguez =

- Born: December 1, 1896; San Marcelino, Zambales, Captaincy General of the Philippines
- Died: February 27, 1980 (aged 83)
- Citizenship: Filipino
- Occupation: Physician
- Years active: 1921–1961
- Medical career
- Field: Leprology

José Natalio Rodríguez was a Filipino leprologist.

== Early life and education ==
Jose N. Rodríguez was born on December 1, 1896, in San Marcelino, Zambales. His father was Juan Rodriguez, a Spaniard farmer and landowner while his mother was Vicente Ferriols of Pampanga who has roots in Cavite. Jose has seven younger siblings. After graduating from high school, Jose Rodríguez went to Manila to study at the University of the Philippines where he obtained his medical degree specializing in leprosy in 1920.

In 1946, Rodríguez earned a scholarship to attend the Western Reserve University in Cleveland in the United States. He alter went to the Columbia University in New York in 1947 for special training, before obtaining his master's degree in public health at the Johns Hopkins University in 1948. He also pursued a postgraduate degree in dermatology in the same year at the Hôpital Saint-Louis in Paris and further trainined at the Hospital de San Juan de Dios in Madrid, Spain, from 1951 to 1958.

== Career ==
Rodríguez became a resident physician at the Philippine General Hospital (PGH) in 1921. In 1922, Rodríguez accepted Governor General Leonard Wood's call for volunteers among the doctors and nurses of PGH to go improve the living conditions of the residents of the Culion leper colony. His first stay in Culion lasted until 1926. He rose up the ranks from being a senior physician, then as supervising physician, and was later appointment as acting chief physician.

Rodríguez went on to help set up a leprosarium in Cebu. He was also made General Supervisor of the Regional Treatment Stations for Leprosy from 1927 to 1946, serving as the American colonial government's leprosy-related activities outside of the Culion leper colony. The Cebu initiative is part of a 10-year pilot Leprosy Control Project. Its components include a regional treatment station (the Eversley Childs Treatment Station), a stationary skin dispensary (Cebu Skin Clinic), and a mobile skin clinic through a vehicle donated by the Leonard Wood Memorial.

He was given a one-year fellowship by the Leonard Wood Memorial to accomplish a certificate in public health from the Johns Hopkins University in 1932

Several treatment stations were established under his watch following the pilot project. The last would be the Tala Leprosarium in Caloocan, Rizal in 1940, becoming its first director. He was also the medical officer of the Bureau of Hospitals from 1941 to 1946, and a supervisor of the Pampanga Provincial Hospital until 1945.

Amidst the Japanese occupation of the Philippines during World War II, treated Filipino and American troops which took part at the Bataan Death March.

After the war, Rodríguez furthered his studies in the United States and Europe.

Prior to the discovery of a cure for leprosy, Rodríguez and his associates have looked into chaulmoogra oil, ethyl esters, and the Mercado mixture as potential therapeutical response to leprosy. From 1947 to 1951, he experimented on sulfone drugs for Tala leprosarium's patients with proved to be effective but slow-acting antibacterial that must be taken for years which led some patients to abandon the treatment or develop resistance to dapsone.

Rodríguez served as the director of the Bureau of Disease Control from 1958 until his retirement in 1961. However he remained a consultant to colleagues and aspiring doctors even after his retirement.

== Personal life ==
Rodríguez married Nieves Hidalgo, the daughter of Luis Hidalgo, in 1927. The couple had four children.

== Death and legacy ==
Rodríguez died on February 27, 1980 Shortly after his death on December 24, 1980, the Tala Leprosarium in Caloocan was renamed as the Dr. Jose N. Rodriguez Memorial Hospital in his honor.
