= APEC Sculpture Garden =

Sculpture park in Pasay, Philippines

Coordinates: 14°33′18.1378″N 120°58′55.0378″E

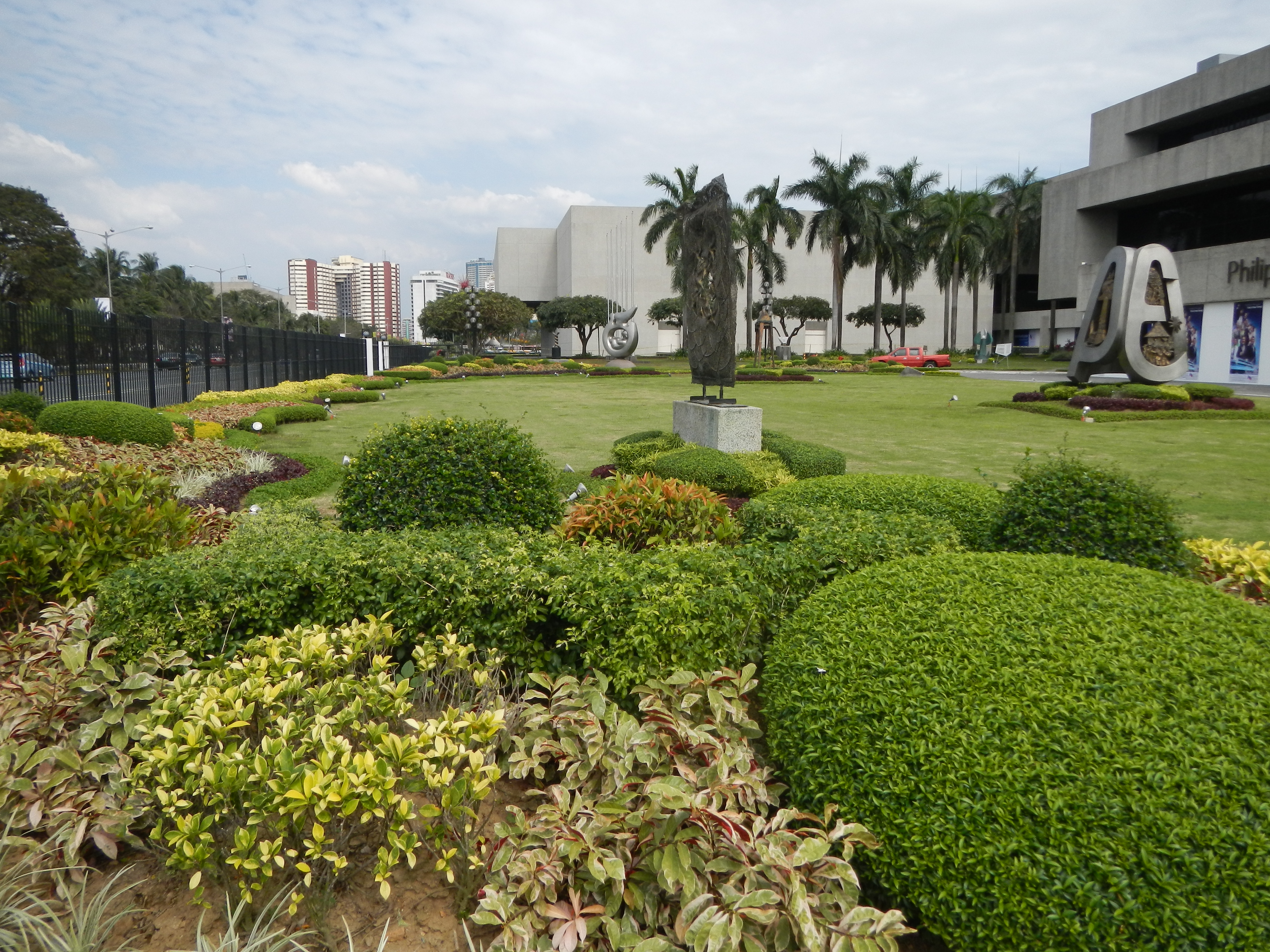
- Interactive map of APEC Sculpture Garden
- Type: Sculpture park
- Location: Vicente Sotto Street, CCP Complex, Pasay, Metro Manila, Philippines
- Created: 1996
- Operator: National Commission for Culture and the Arts
- Status: Opened

The Asia-Pacific Economic Cooperation (APEC) Sculpture Garden is a sculpture park located in the right, left and front lawns of the Philippine International Convention Center at the CCP Complex in Pasay, Metro Manila, Philippines.

The sculpture garden was opened and dedicated on 22 November 1996. It was jointly organized by the Department of Foreign Affairs and the National Commission for Culture and the Arts, the curator of the garden, in commemoration of the APEC Philippines 1996.

== Sculptures ==
The garden is composed of 20 unique sculptures made by artists from their respective APEC countries. Each sculpture embodies the collective ideals of the 20 APEC member economies.

The countries that donated their sculptures to the garden include Australia, Brunei, Canada, China, Chile, Hong Kong, Indonesia, Japan, Malaysia, Mexico, New Zealand, Philippines, Papua New Guinea, South Korea, Russia, Singapore, Chinese Taipei, Thailand, United States and Vietnam. As of 2017, only Peru has yet to donate a sculpture to the garden. The exact location of the layout of each sculpture was studied individually and presented in the best space where it would harmonize or be enhanced by the surrounding landscape. The angles of each sculpture were likewise studied in relation to the PICC’s minimalist architectural design, with the objective of bringing out the most unusual point of each sculpture’s design.
