= Dr. Jose N. Rodriguez Memorial Hospital =

Government hospital in Caloocan, Philippines

- Department of Health
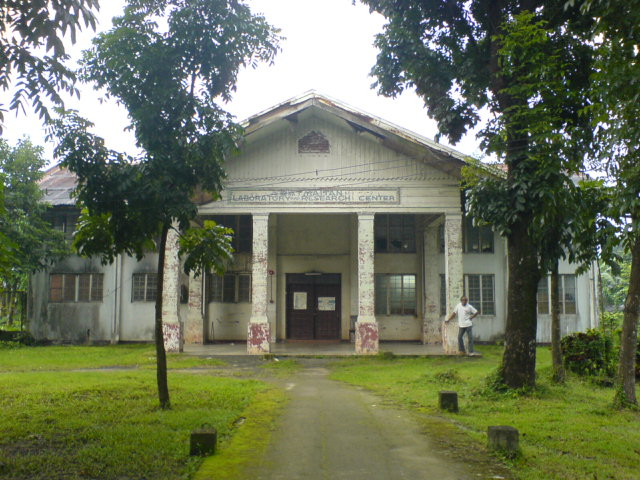

- Location within Metro Manila Location within Luzon Location within Philippines

Geography
- Location: Caloocan, Metro Manila, Philippines
- Coordinates: 14°46′00″N 121°03′53″E

Organization
- Care system: Philippine Health Insurance Corporation (PhilHealth) accredited
- Type: Tertiary

Services
- Beds: 2,000

History
- Former names: Central Luzon Sanitarium; Tala Leprosarium
- Founded: 1940

Links
- Website: djnrmh.doh.gov.ph

The Dr. Jose N. Rodriguez Memorial Hospital (DJNRMH), also known as the Tala Hospital, is a hospital within the district of Tala, in Caloocan, Metro Manila. The hospital is named after Filipino leprologist José N. Rodríguez.

== History ==
The Central Luzon Sanitarium, also known as the Tala Leprosarium, was established in 1940 on a 808 hectares (2,000 acres) site in Tala, Caloocan, which was then part of Rizal province.

It was originally intended to accommodate patients with leprosy or Hansen's disease in the entire Luzon region in the Philippines.

In 1970, the hospital began treating general medical cases (non-Hansen disease patients) when there was a high success rate of treatment of the first Hansen patients from research and the advancement of procedures done within the current medical practice. Due to the significant drop of Hansen patients the hospital then considered admission of general cases.

The Batas Pambansa Blg. 94 was enacted on December 24, 1980, renaming the facility as the Dr. Jose N. Rodriguez Memorial Hospital to commemorate the health facility's first director.

The hospital currently serves as the principal referral hospital for leprosy patients and the premier training and research center for leprosy care and management in the Philippines. It also serves the public health needs of community members of Tala and nearby areas.

== The DJNRMH today ==
Today, DJNRMH envisions becoming a Tertiary General Hospital and a Center for Rehabilitation and care of leprosy patients. In 2007, President Gloria Macapagal Arroyo signed Republic Act 9420, converting 200 beds of the 2,000 beds of DJNRMH for tertiary general health care.

== Affiliations and linkages ==
The former sanitarium serves and attends to patients together with other recognized Philippine non-government organizations (NGO) and including nearby religious organizations and Churches that send contributions and visit abandoned or dying patients for religious services and rites whenever applicable.

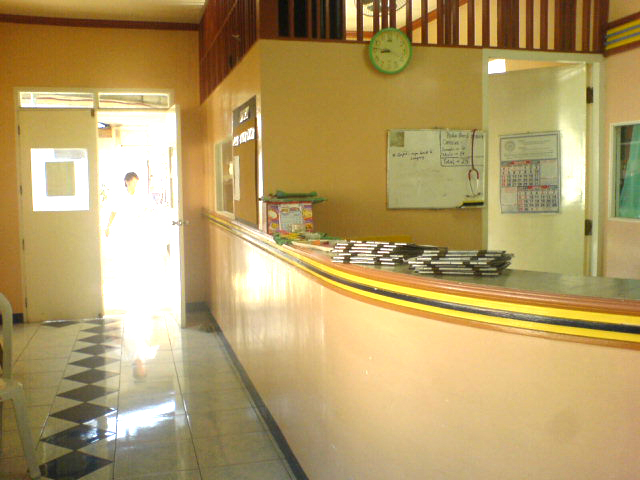
Pediatric ward

== See also ==
- List of hospitals in Metro Manila
