= Plaza Cervantes =

Public square in Binondo, Manila

Plaza de Cervantes
- Public square
- {{{other_names}}}
- Former names: Plaza San Gabriel; Plaza Vivac
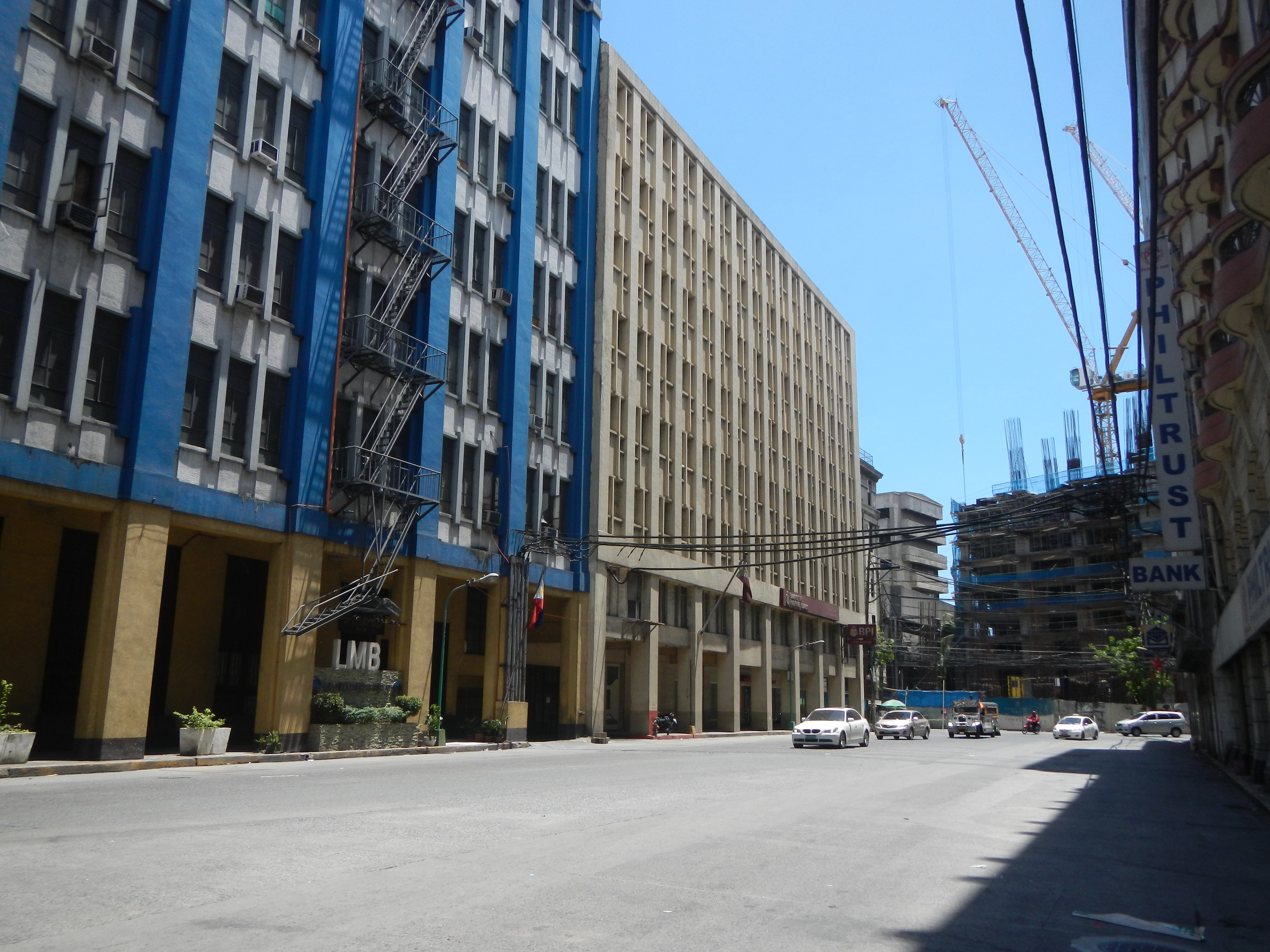
- Dedicated to: Miguel de Cervantes
- Owner: City of Manila
- Location: Binondo; Manila, Philippines
- Location within Metro Manila Location within Luzon Location within Philippines
- Coordinates: 14°35′49.1″N 120°58′33.2″E

Plaza de Cervantes is a public square in Binondo, Manila, bounded by Quintin Paredes Street (formerly Calle Rosario) to the east and Juan Luna Street (formerly Calle Anloague) to the west, near the Estero de Binondo. Dedicated to Spanish writer Miguel de Cervantes, it is one of three main plazas in Binondo, located between Plaza Moraga to the south and Plaza San Lorenzo Ruiz to the north.

== History ==
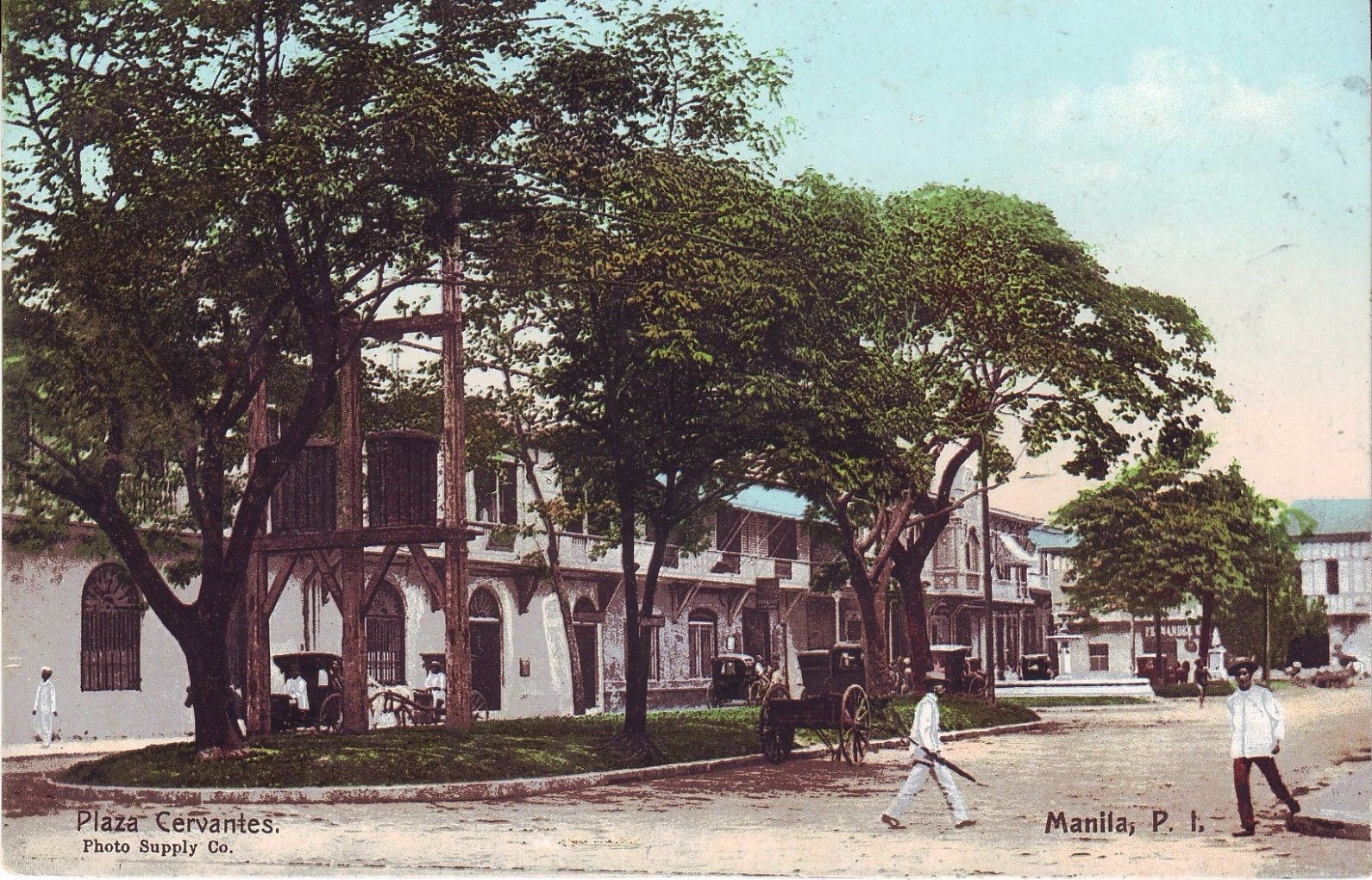
View of Plaza de Cervantes from Calle Rosario, taken around 1910.

Plaza de Cervantes was originally called Plaza San Gabriel, named after the Misión San Gabriel, a mission of the Dominican Order which evangelised to the area's Chinese community. It later became Plaza Vivac as the area grew to become a commercial center, and later received its current name as it became the financial center of Manila. The plaza was damaged in the 1863 Manila earthquake, where the ground reportedly opened and sulfuric fumes came out.

Originally covered with cobblestone, by the early years of the American colonial period the plaza was dominated by low-rise commercial buildings, which author and Thomasite Paul T. Gilbert likened to a scene out of Othello or The Merchant of Venice. In 1916, a monument was installed in the plaza to Tomás Pinpin, the first Filipino printer, although infrastructure improvements initiated by the colonial government led to businesses moving out of the plaza and to the nearby Plaza de Goiti (now Plaza Lacson) and Escolta Street.

While Binondo was largely spared from the Battle of Manila in 1945, and economic activity recovered thereafter, the area around the plaza started declining around the 1960s, when most business activity shifted from Manila to Makati and Cubao in Quezon City. With increased traffic congestion in the area, the monument to Tomás Pinpin was relocated to Plaza Calderón de la Barca (now Plaza San Lorenzo Ruiz) in 1979, when the plaza was cleared to make room for more parking space.

In 2014, the Megaworld Corporation announced that it was going to redevelop and rehabilitate the plaza and its immediate area as part of the construction of a new condominium building, the 47-story Noble Place. A garden is expected to be installed once the rehabilitation is complete.

== Surrounding buildings and structures ==
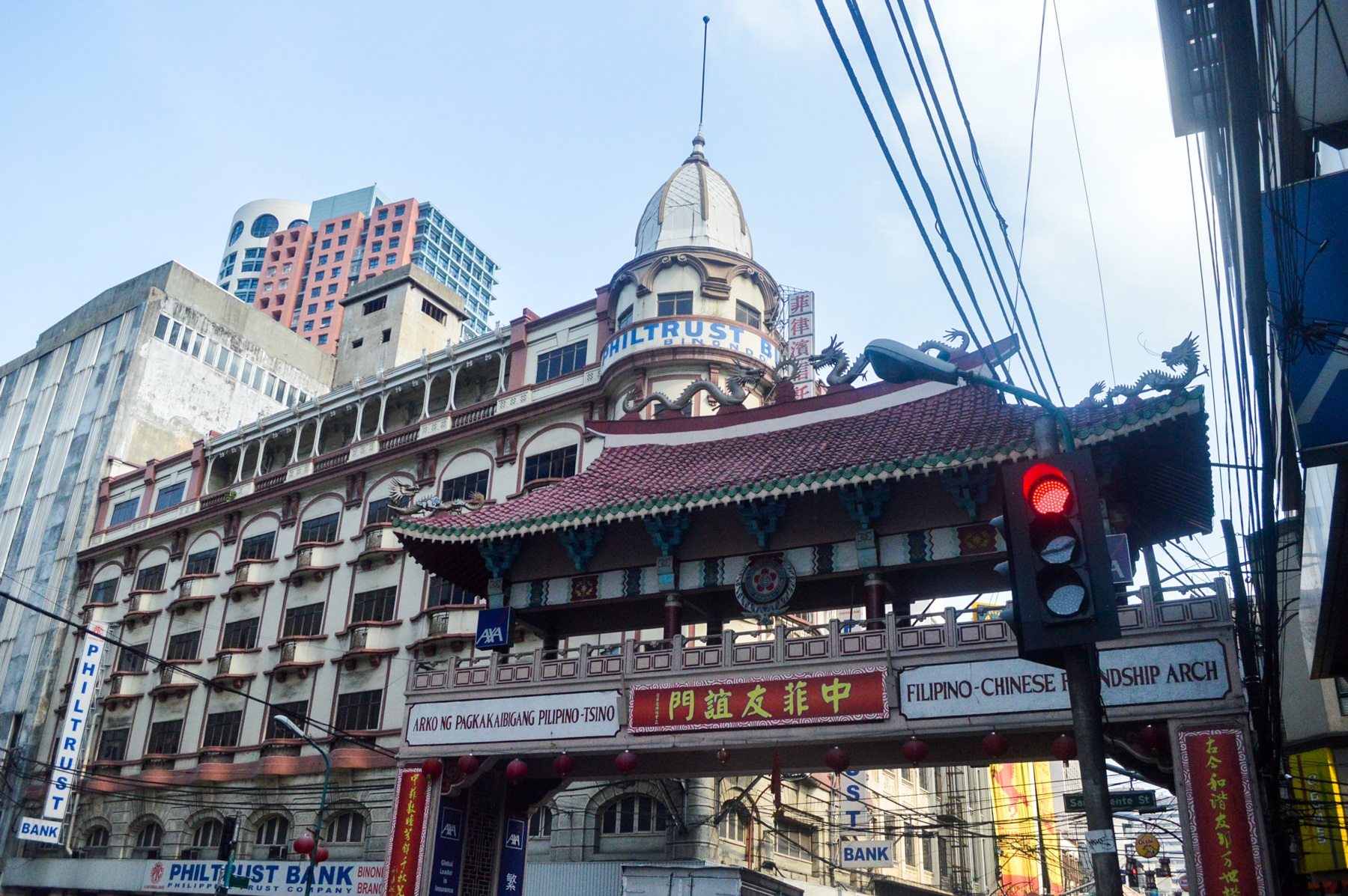
The Mariano Uy Chaco Building, said to be Manila's first skyscraper, is the area's most notable building.

Owing to its status as a financial center in its heyday, a number of notable buildings and structures have been built in and around the vicinity of Plaza de Cervantes, including some of Manila's tallest buildings at the time. The most notable building currently standing is the Mariano Uy Chaco Building, built in 1914 and said to be Manila's first skyscraper. Designed by American architect Samuel E. Rowell in the Art Nouveau style, and including a distinctive clock tower, it was the headquarters for Uy Chaco and Sons, a hardware company which imported goods from the United States for local distribution. Beside it is the Geronimo de los Reyes Building, also known as the Edificio A. Soriano. Designed by Juan Nakpil, the building later came to the ownership of industrialist Andrés Soriano, becoming the headquarters for his eponymous conglomerate and later buying out neighboring buildings for its expansion, with the expansions designed by Andrés Luna de San Pedro. The building at the time also hosted the Franco-era Spanish consulate, owing to Soriano's Francoist sympathies, as well as the law firm Dewitt, Perkins, and Ponce-Enrile, where Alfonso Ponce Enrile, father of Juan Ponce Enrile, was a partner. Damaged in the Battle of Manila and subsequently restored, the building is presently abandoned.

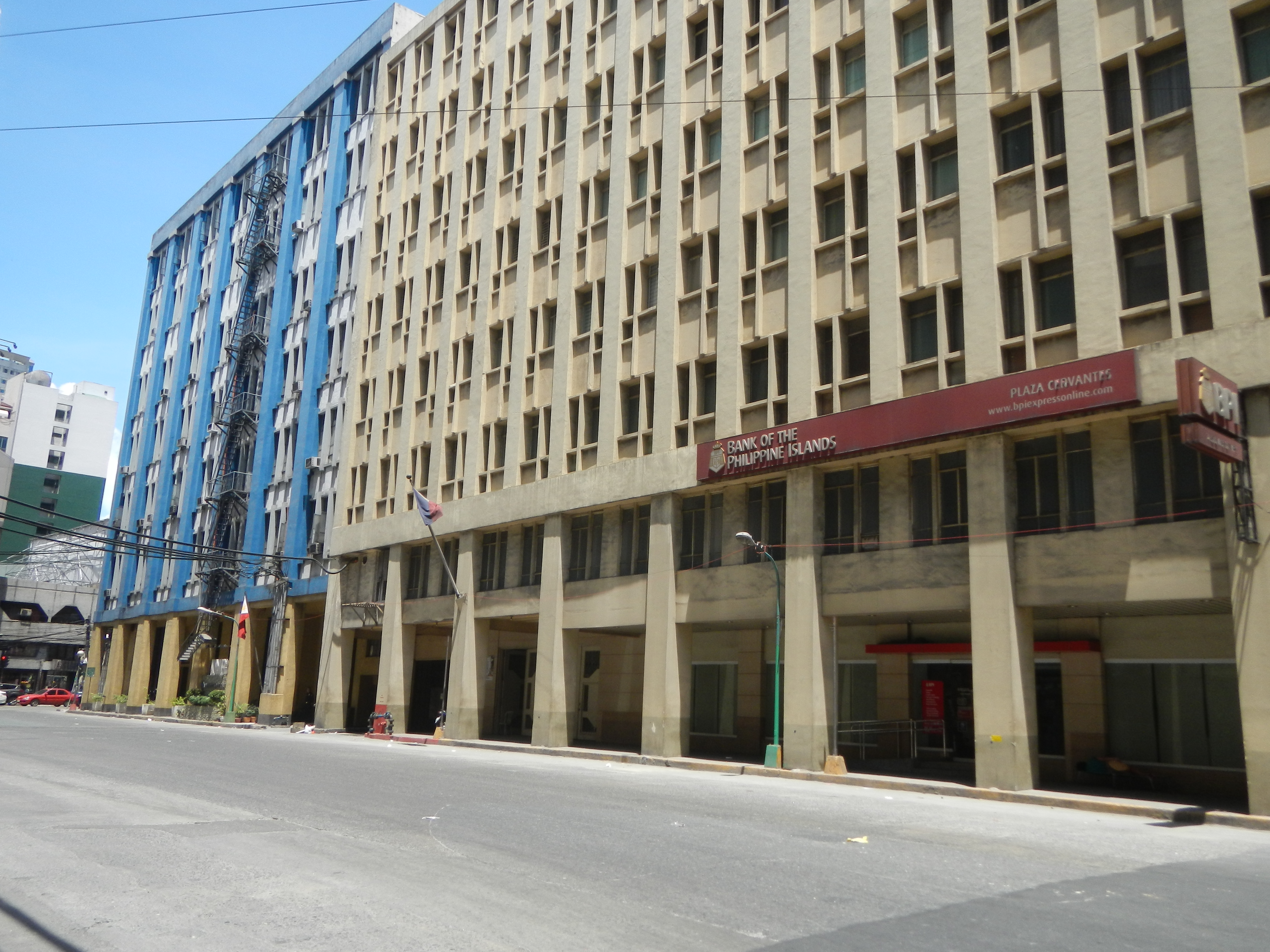
Bank of the Philippine Islands has had a continuous presence at Plaza de Cervantes since 1892, when it moved its headquarters here from Intramuros.

Across from the Mariano Uy Chaco Building on the corner with Plaza Moraga was the Insular Life Building, built on the site of a former Chinese cemetery and rising taller to become Manila's tallest pre-war structure. Likewise designed by Andrés Luna de San Pedro, it was known for the distinctive eagle on its pinnacle. Originally built as the headquarters of the Insular Life Assurance Company, the Philippines' first own life insurance company, it also hosted the trading floor of the Philippine Stock Exchange, as well as the studios of colonial-era radio station KZRM (now DZRB-AM). Also damaged in the Battle of Manila and subsequently restored, the building was later demolished after Insular Life relocated to Makati in 1962.

Several financial institutions have also been located in Plaza de Cervantes at some point in their history. In 1892, the Banco Español-Filipino, now Bank of the Philippine Islands (BPI), relocated to 4 Plaza Cervantes from their first headquarters in Intramuros, the property being owned at the time by the Dominicans. BPI still maintains a branch today on the same site. Meanwhile, the Hongkong and Shanghai Banking Corporation (HSBC) established its first branch in the Philippines — the first foreign bank to do so — at the corner of the plaza and Calle Rosario on November 11, 1875, later moving to a new building on the other end of the plaza in 1922. Although HSBC moved out in 1971 in favor of moving to new offices in Makati, and the building was in a state of disrepair for several years thereafter, the building was restored and now houses the 1919 Grand Café. Philtrust Bank, meanwhile, is the current owner of the Mariano Uy Chaco Building, maintaining a branch on the building's ground floor.

A number of government offices are also located in the plaza's vicinity. The National Archives maintains administrative offices behind the plaza at the Juan Luna Building at the corner of Juan Luna Street and the Muelle de la Industria, while the Land Management Bureau (LMB) formerly maintained its headquarters on the site of the former Insular Life Building. In 2018, both buildings, as well as the BPI building, were damaged in a fire that started in the LMB offices, causing ₱100 million worth of damage to equipment and destroying several important documents, including land titles, held in storage at the LMB. The LMB has since relocated to a new headquarters along Quezon Avenue in Quezon City, and the old headquarters remains abandoned.

== See also ==
- List of parks in Manila
- List of city squares
