= Binondo =

District of Manila, Metro Manila, Philippines

Coordinates: 14.600°N 120.967°E

- Constituent and Central Business District of Manila

Other transcription(s)
  - Chinese: 岷倫洛
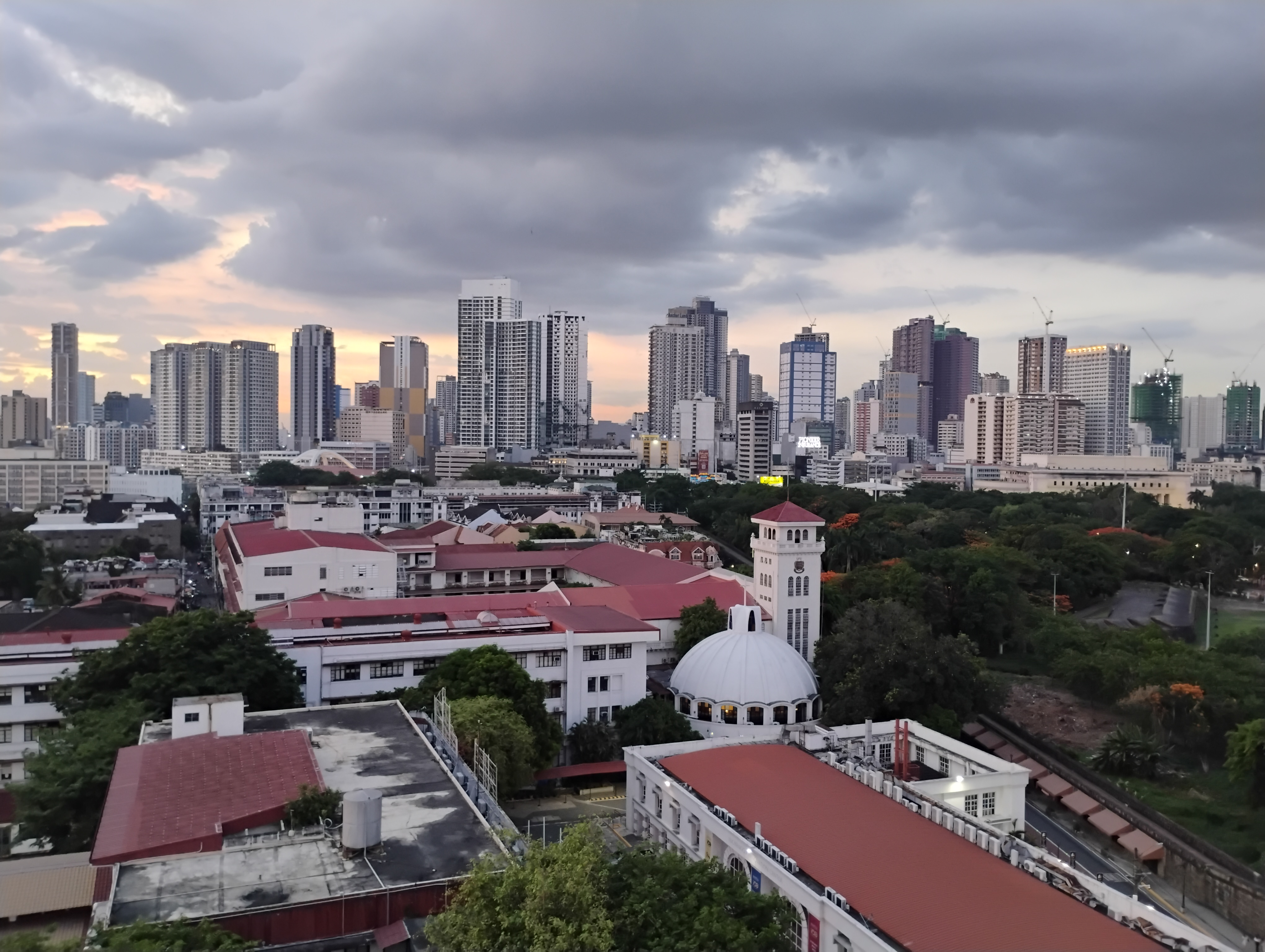
- Binondo as seen from Intramuros
- Nickname: Chinatown
- Interactive map of Binondo
- Location within Philippines
- Country: Philippines
- Region: National Capital Region
- City: Manila
- Congressional District: Part of 3rd District of Manila
- Barangays: 10
- Founded: 1594
- Founder: Luis Pérez Dasmariñas

Area
  - Total: 0.66 km^{2} (0.25 sq mi)

Population (2024 census)
  - Total: 23,935
  - Density: 36,000/km^{2} (94,000/sq mi)
- Time zone: UTC+08:00 (Philippine Standard Time)
- Zip codes: 1006
- Area codes: 2
- Languages: Hokkien; Tagalog; Mandarin

Binondo
- Traditional Chinese: 岷倫洛區
- Simplified Chinese: 岷伦洛区
Transcriptions
Standard Mandarin
- Hanyu Pinyin: Mínlúnluò Qū
- Bopomofo: ㄇㄧㄣˊ ㄌㄨㄣˊ ㄌㄨㄛˋ ㄑㄩ
- Wade–Giles: Min^{2}-lun^{2}-lo^{4} Ch'ü^{1}
- IPA: [mǐn.lwə̌n.lwô tɕʰý]
Yue: Cantonese
- Yale Romanization: Màhn lèuhn lok kēui āu
- Jyutping: Man4 leon4 lok3 keoi1 au1
- IPA: [mɐn˩ lɵn˩ lɔk̚˧ kʰɵɥ˥ ɐw˥]
Southern Min
- Hokkien POJ: Bîn-lûn-lo̍h-khu

Binondo (Chinese: 岷倫洛; pinyin: Mínlúnluò; Pe̍h-ōe-jī: Bîn-lûn-lo̍h; Tagalog: Distrito ng Binondo) is a district in Manila and is referred to as the city's Chinatown. Its influence extends beyond to the places of Quiapo, Santa Cruz, San Nicolas and Tondo. It is the oldest Chinatown in the world, established in 1594 by the Spaniards as a settlement near Intramuros but across the Pasig River for Catholic Chinese; it was positioned so that the colonial administration could keep a close eye on their migrant subjects. It was already a hub of Chinese commerce even before the Spanish colonial period. Binondo is the center of commerce and trade of Manila, where all types of business run by Chinese Filipinos thrive.

Noted residents include Saint Lorenzo Ruiz, the Filipino protomartyr, and Venerable Mother Ignacia del Espiritu Santo, founder of the Congregation of the Religious of the Virgin Mary.

== Etymology ==
Numerous theories on the origin of the name "Binondo", and that of "Tondo", its neighboring district, have been put forward. Philippine National Artist Nick Joaquin suggested that the names might have been derived from the archaic spelling of the Tagalog term "binondoc" (modern orthography: binundók), or mountainous, referring to Binondo's originally hilly terrain. French linguist Jean-Paul Potet, however, has suggested that the river mangrove (Aegiceras corniculatum), which at the time was called "tundok" ("tinduk-tindukan" today), is the most likely origin of the term, with the 'Bi-" prefix in "Binondo" indicating Binondo's location relative to Tondo.

== History ==
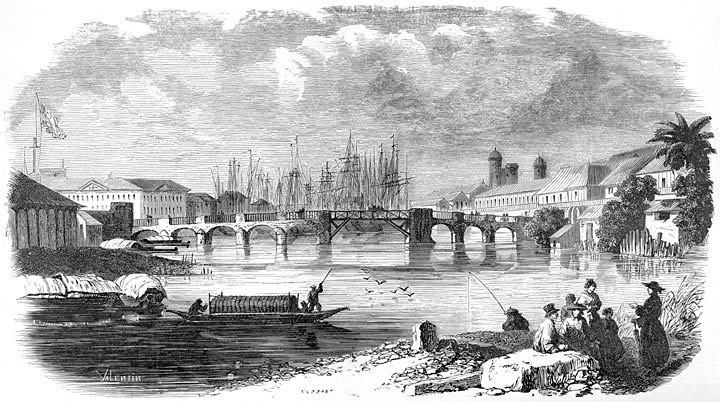
Bridge of Binondoc in Manila, early 19th century. Original caption: Pont de Binondoc à Manille. From Aventures d'un Gentilhomme Breton aux iles Philippines (1855) by Paul de la Gironière.

Founded in 1594, Binondo was created by Spanish Governor Luis Pérez Dasmariñas as a permanent settlement for Chinese immigrants (the Spanish called the Chinese sangleys) who converted to Catholicism. It was across the river from the walled city of Intramuros, where the Spaniards resided.

Originally it was intended to replace the Parian near Intramuros, where Sangley Chinese merchants and artisans were first confined. The Spanish gave a land grant for Binondo to a group of Chinese merchants and artisans in perpetuity, tax-free and with limited self-governing privileges. The area also served as a midpoint in between Parián (modern-day Arroceros Urban Forest Park) and San Nicolas, since way before the Spanish conquest of Manila in the Battle of Manila (1570), a Sangley Chinese community had already settled in Baybay (former name of San Nicolas, Manila) near Tondo on the north bank of the Pasig river directly on Binondo's west.

The Spanish Dominican fathers made Binondo their parish and succeeded in converting many of the residents to Catholicism. Binondo soon became the place where Chinese immigrants converted to Catholicism, intermarried with indigenous Filipino women and had children, who became the Chinese mestizo community. Over the years, the Chinese mestizo population of Binondo grew rapidly. This was caused mainly because the lack of Chinese immigrant females and the Spanish officials' policy of expelling Chinese immigrants who refused to convert and casualties during Chinese revolts against the Spanish.

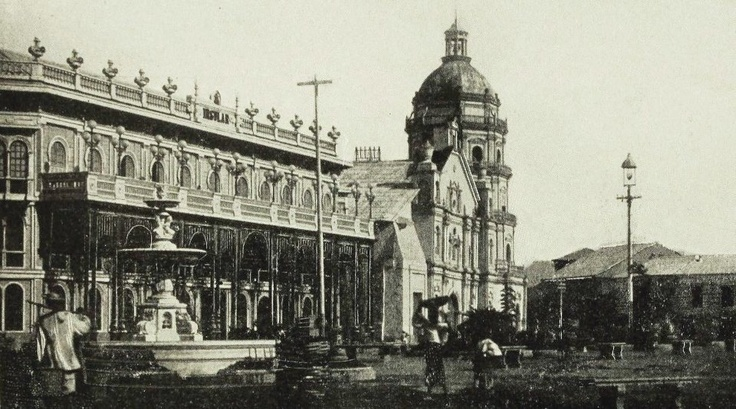
Plaza Calderón de la Barca in Binondo with the view of Binondo Church

In 1603, a Chinese revolt took place led by Juan Suntay, a wealthy Chinese Catholic. The Chinese were at first successful and slaughtered the Spanish governor general Luis Pérez Dasmariñas and his Spanish forces. The revolt took place right after a visit to Manila by three official Chinese representatives who disclosed they were searching for "a mountain of gold". This strange claim prompted the Spanish to conclude that there was an imminent invasion from China in the making and Luis tried attacking the Chinese first. At the time the local Chinese outnumbered the Spaniards by twenty to one, and Spanish authorities feared that they would join the invading forces. However, Filipinos loyal to the Spanish outnumbered the Chinese and the Filipinos saved the surviving Spanish and put down the revolt. In the aftermath most of the 20,000 Chinese that composed the colony were killed. In 1605, a Fukien official issued a letter claiming that the Chinese who had participated in the revolt were unworthy of China's protection, describing them as "deserters of the tombs of their ancestors". New Chinese migrants repopulated Binondo. During the brief British occupation of Manila, between 1762 and 1764, Binondo was damaged during the capture of the city. The new governor of Manila, Dawsonne Drake, formed a war council which he termed the "Chottry Court". Drake imprisoned several Manilans on charges known "only known to himself", according Captain Thomas Backhouse, who denounced Drake's court as a sham.

Binondo became the main center for business and finance in Manila for the ethnic Chinese, Chinese mestizos and Spanish Filipinos. During the Spanish colonial period, many esteros (canals) were constructed in the Binondo area, from where they entered the Pasig River. Among the many who married at the historic Binondo Church was Andres Bonifacio, who organized the Katipunan, or Assembly that started the first battles of what is known as the Philippine Revolution against Spanish colonial rule.

Before World War II, Binondo was the center of a banking and financial community which included insurance companies, commercial banks and other financial institutions from Britain and the United States. These banks were located mostly along Escólta, which used to be called the "Wall Street of the Philippines".

After the war and new development, most businesses began to relocate to the newer Zobel de Ayala family-led area of Makati. During the financial crisis of the early 1980s under the presidency of Ferdinand Marcos, it had the moniker "Binondo Central Bank", as the local Chinese businessmen engaged in massive black market trading of US dollars, which often determined the national peso-dollar exchange rate. Given its rich historical and financial significance, Binondo is said to have one of the highest land values nationwide.

The Binondo was plot setting for the episode "Mata" and "Mukha" of the 2010 horror film Cinco.

A geopolitical incident erupted within Binondo in August 2020, when Manila mayor Isko Moreno took an exception to an imported beauty product in which the product packaging labelled the importer's address as "707 Sto. Cristo St. San Nicolas, Manila Province, P.R. China". He said in anger that Binondo is "not and will never be a province of China", and ordered the city officials to close down all Chinatown area stores selling the product. PBA Partylist Representative Jericho Nograles suggested the blacklisting of both the Chinese manufacturer and the importer of the beauty product. Malacañang palace dismissed the incident as "nonsense" and claimed "no one believes we are a province of China"; political analyst Richard Heydarian opined this response as a proof of the Duterte administration's leaning towards China in the midst of both the territorial dispute with China and the survey results showing the desire of the majority of the Filipinos to hold China accountable for the economic impact of the COVID-19 pandemic in the Philippines.

Historical images of Binondo

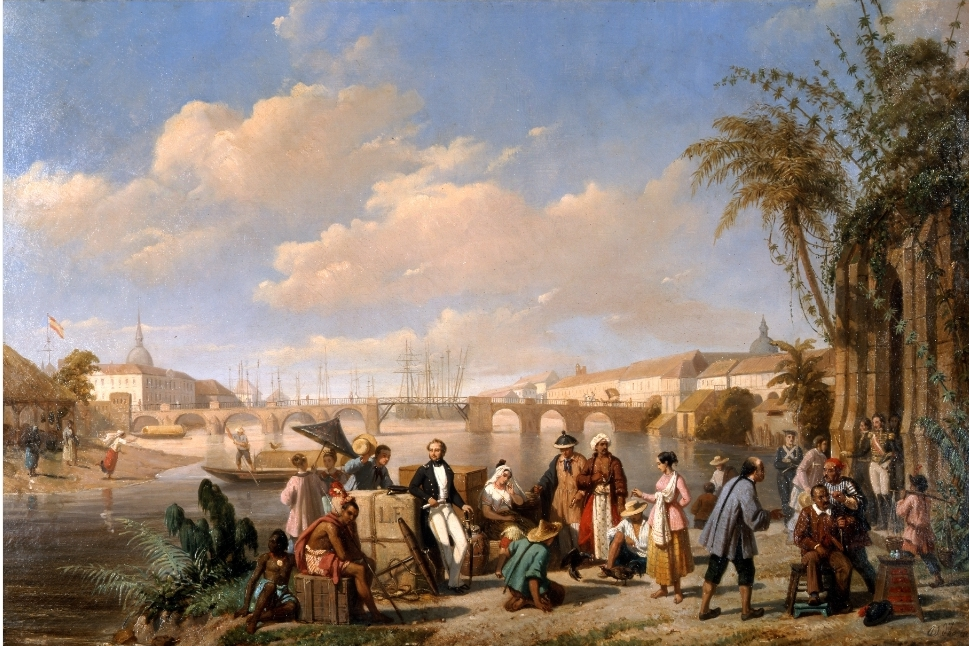
View of Puente de España, the bridge that once connected Binondo from Ermita. (1800s)

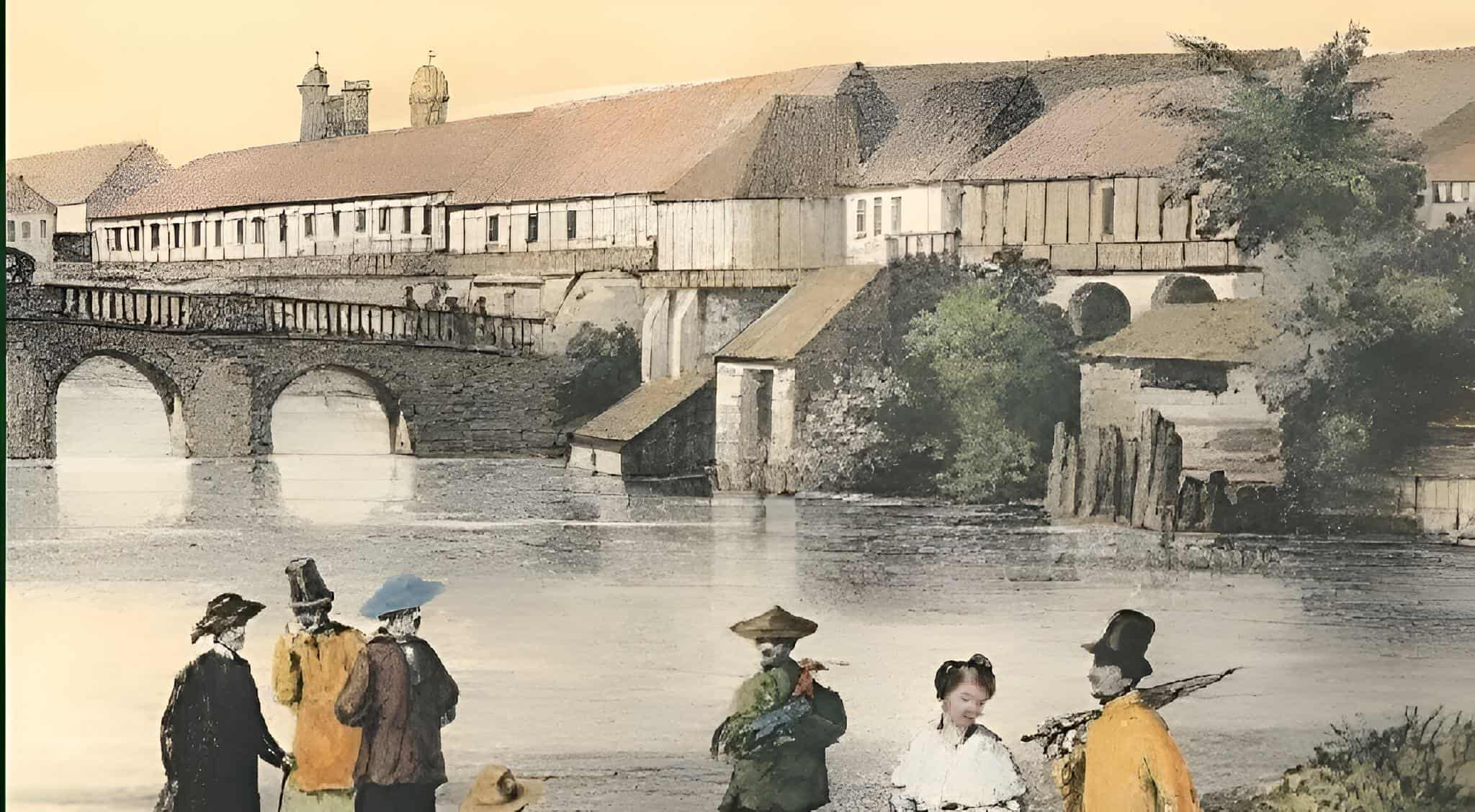
View of the Binondo Side of Pasig River with its Bahay na bato structure's lined beside the river. circa 19th century

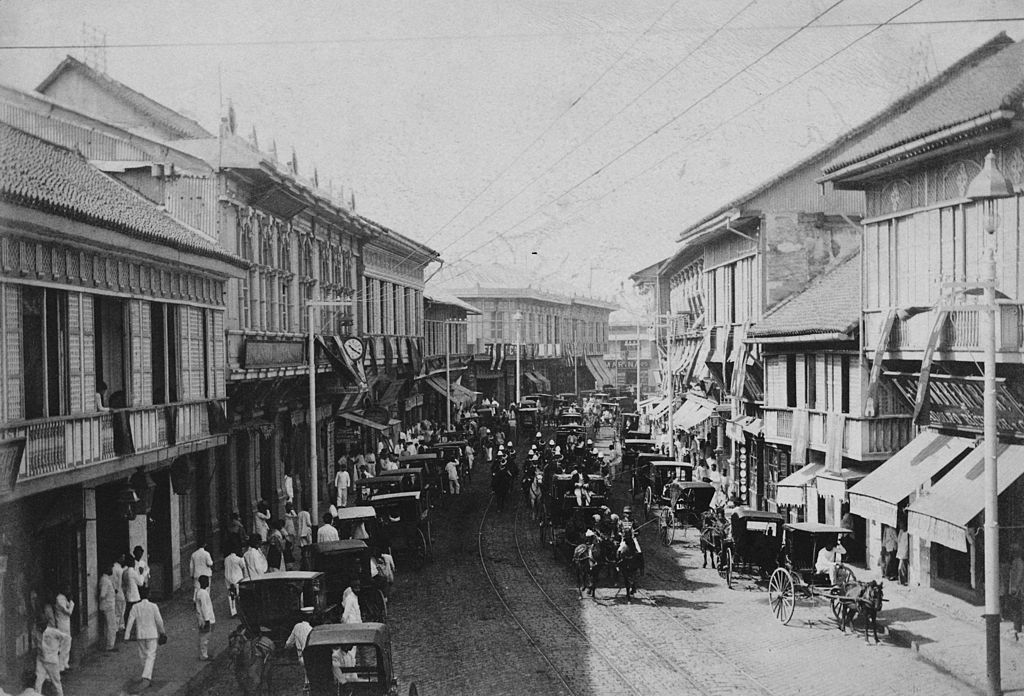
Escolta street (1910)

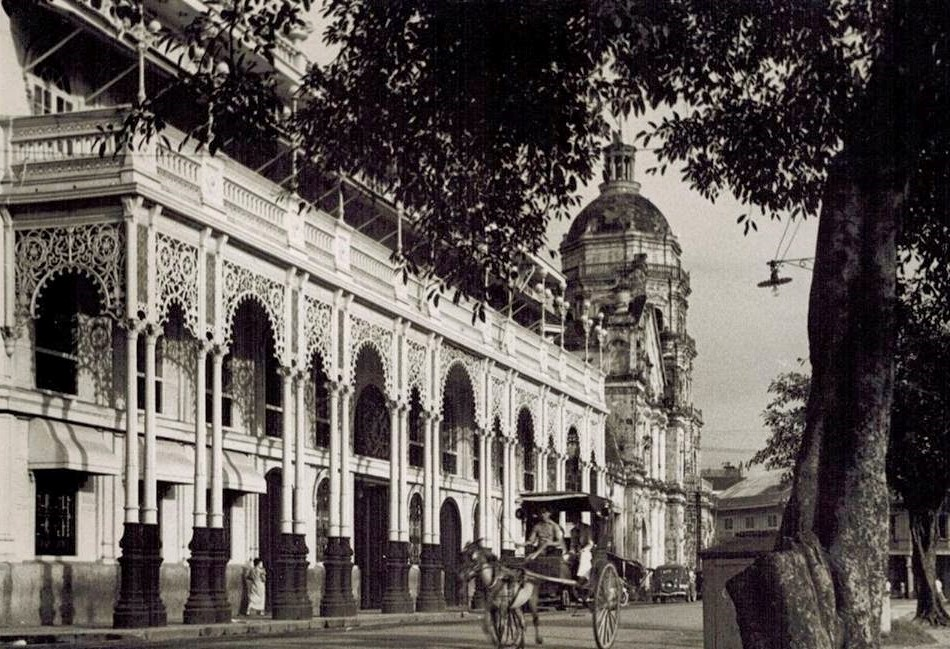
La Insular Cigar Factory

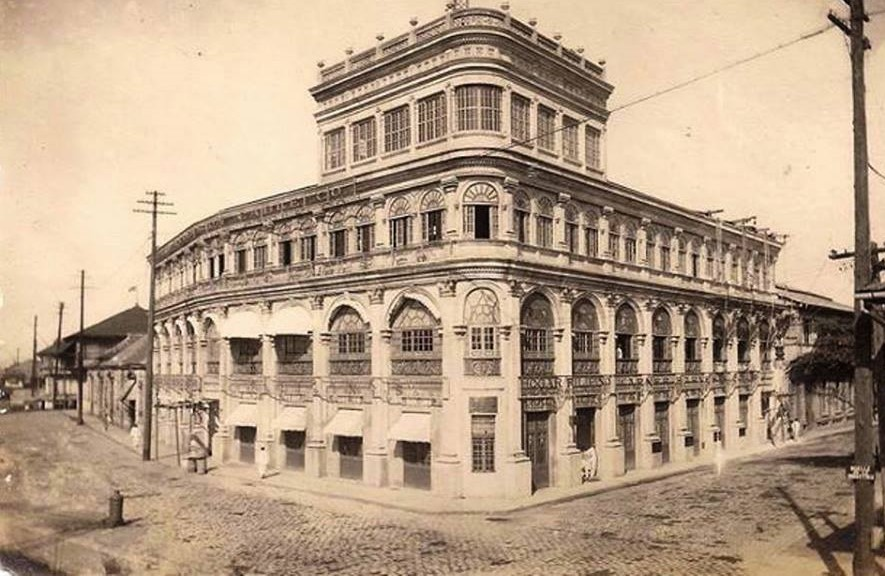
El Hogar Filipino Building, built in 1914, example of Beaux-Arts style architecture

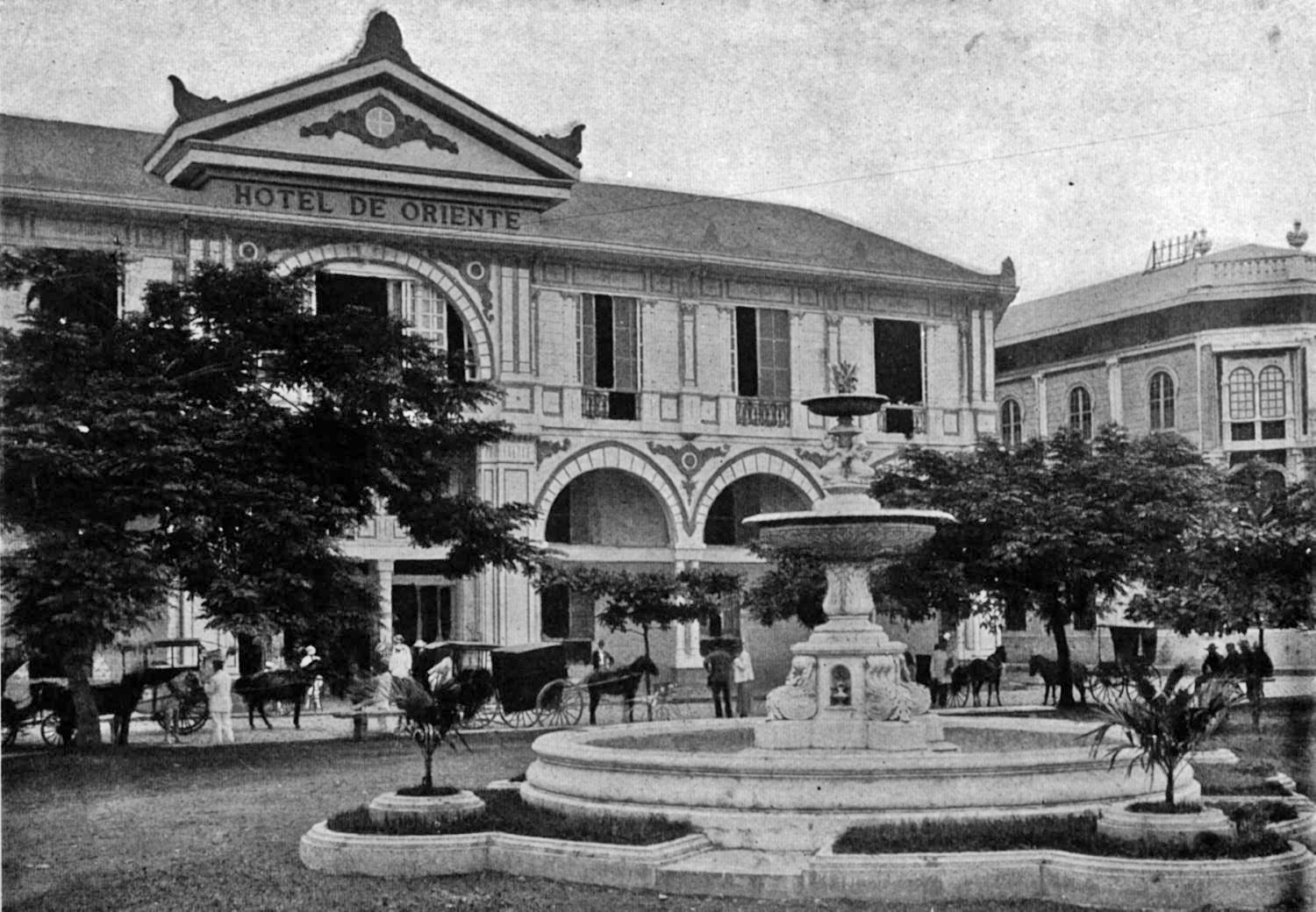
Hotel De Oriente

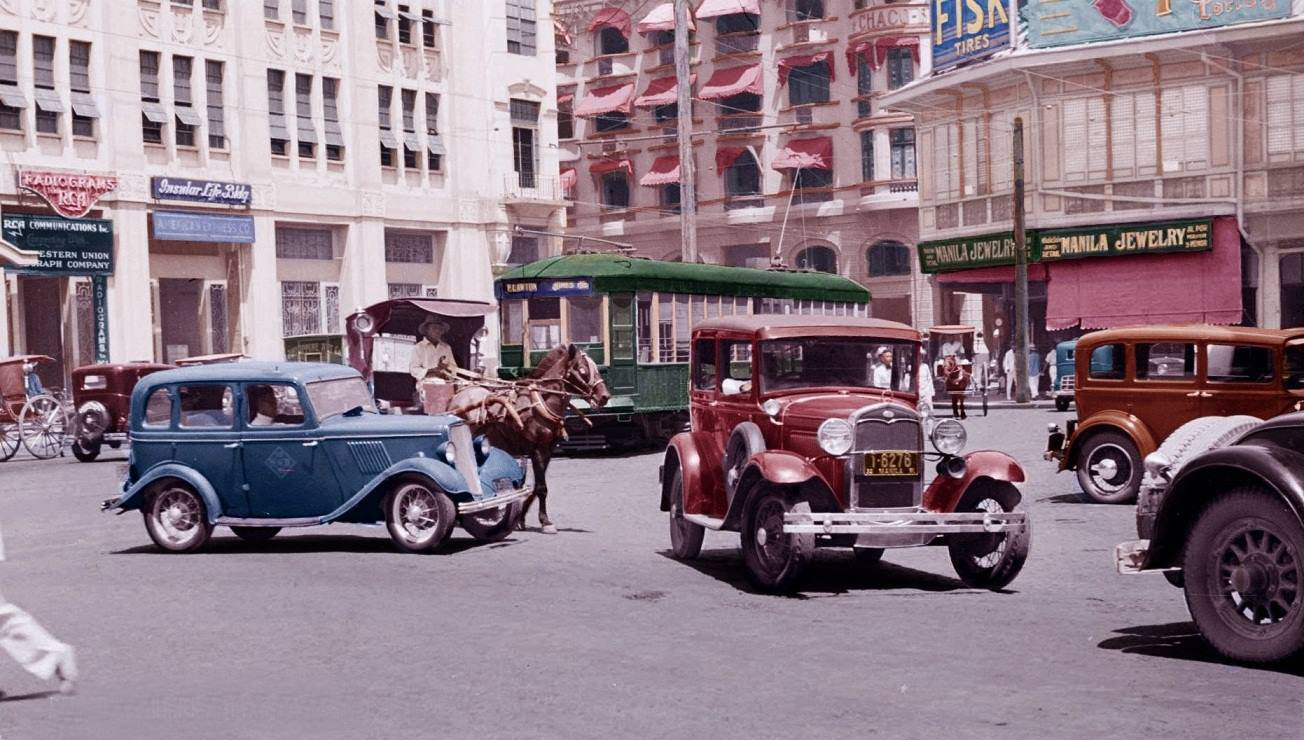
Plaza Moraga in the 1930s.

== Barangays ==
The most populated barangay in Binondo is Barangay 293.
Zone 27: 287, 288, 289, 290, 291
Zone 28: 292, 293, 294, 295, 296

Barangay	Land area (km^{2})	Population (2024 census)
Zone 27
Barangay 287	0.1277 km^{2}	3,117
Barangay 288	0.03718 km^{2}	2,800
Barangay 289	0.04449 km^{2}	1,352
Barangay 290	0.05753 km^{2}	1,713
Barangay 291	0.1064 km^{2}	2,537
Zone 28
Barangay 292	0.05359 km^{2}	3,113
Barangay 293	0.1273 km^{2}	3,708
Barangay 294	0.05067 km^{2}	1,905
Barangay 295	0.02587 km^{2}	1,417
Barangay 296	0.03502 km^{2}	2,273

== Places of interest ==
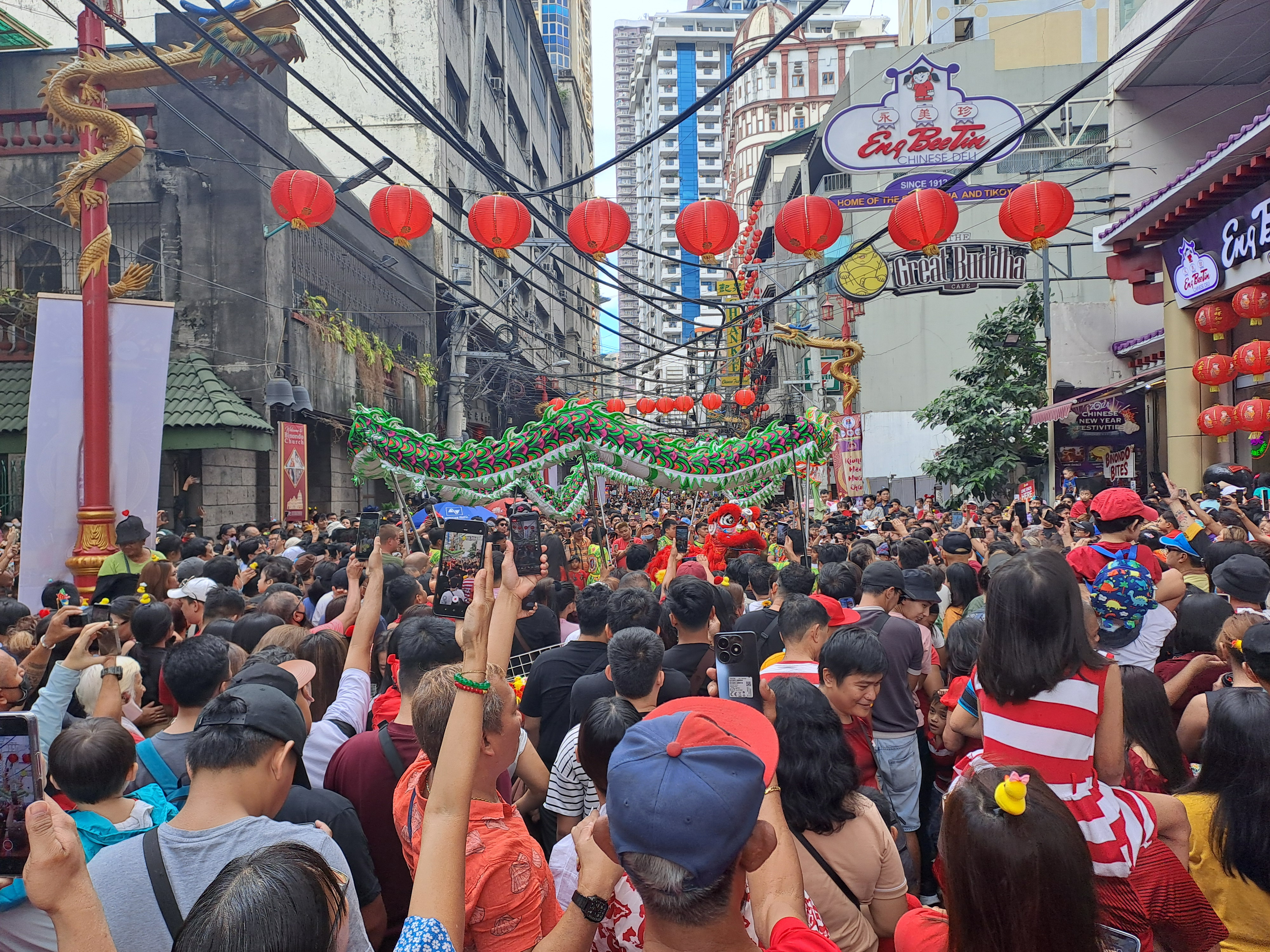
Celebration of Chinese New Year in Binondo, Manila (2024)

- Plaza San Lorenzo Ruiz
- Panciteria Macanista de Buen Gusto - A building notably mentioned in José Rizal's novel Noli me Tangere.
- Plaza Moraga
- Plaza Cervantes
- Binondo Church
- Escolta Street
- Ongpin Street - One of the district's famous streets, where various Chinese vendor establishments and Chinese commercial spaces/buildings reside. Several tea houses, restaurants, and hawker-style stalls that serve authentic dimsum and Chinese cuisine can be found along Ongpin Street. As such, this area has become popular as a gastronomic and cultural hotspot. Locals and tourists are known to embark on a what is called as a Binondo Food Crawl to sample the cuisine along Ongpin Street.
- Lucky Chinatown Mall
- Chinatown Arch
- Filipino-Chinese Friendship Arch
- Jones Bridge

== In literature ==
Binondo was mentioned several times in the novels of Dr. José Rizal, for example, in Noli Me Tangere and El Filibusterismo.

== Gallery ==
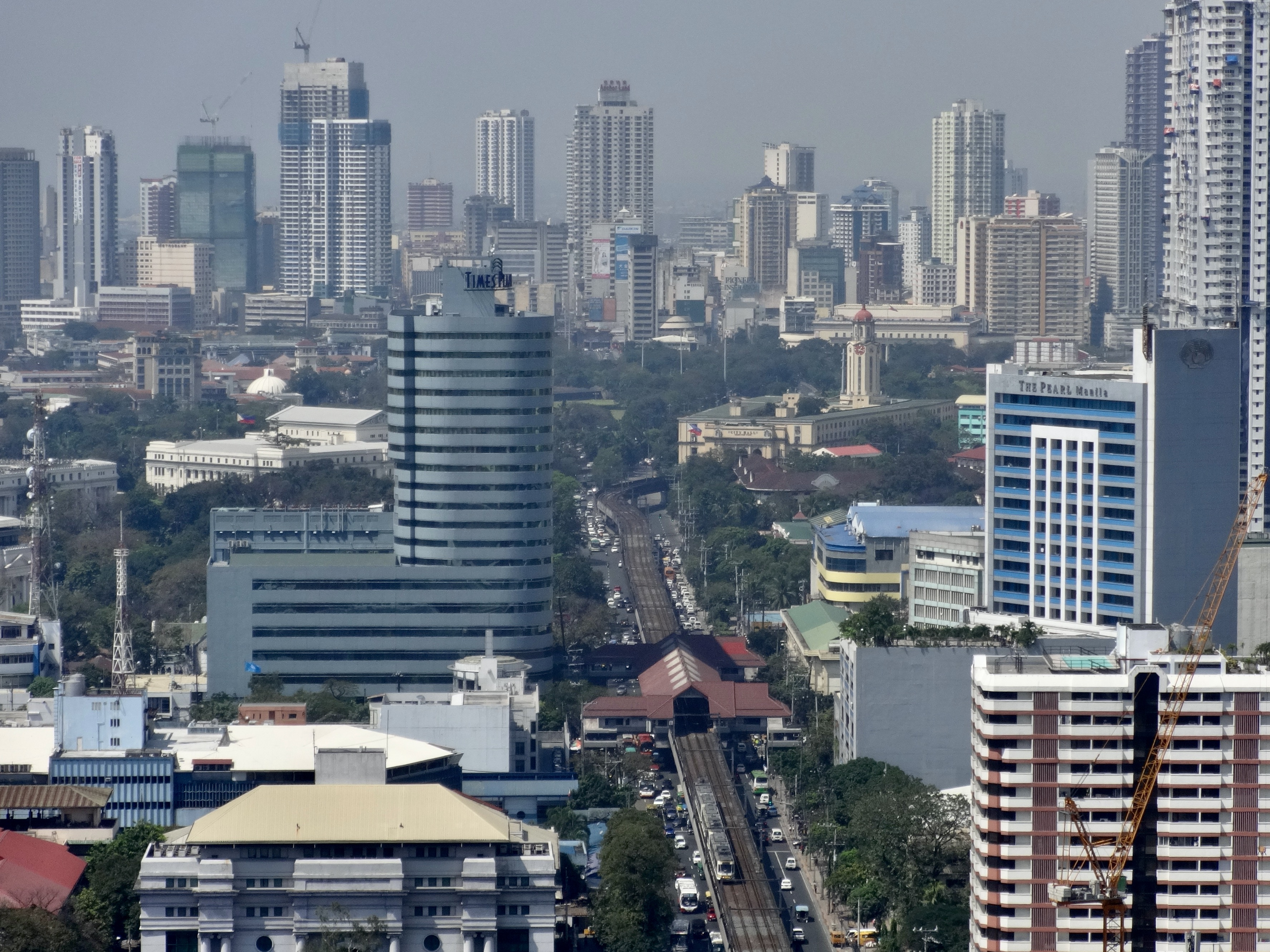
Binondo, with the Manila City Hall and the United Nations station

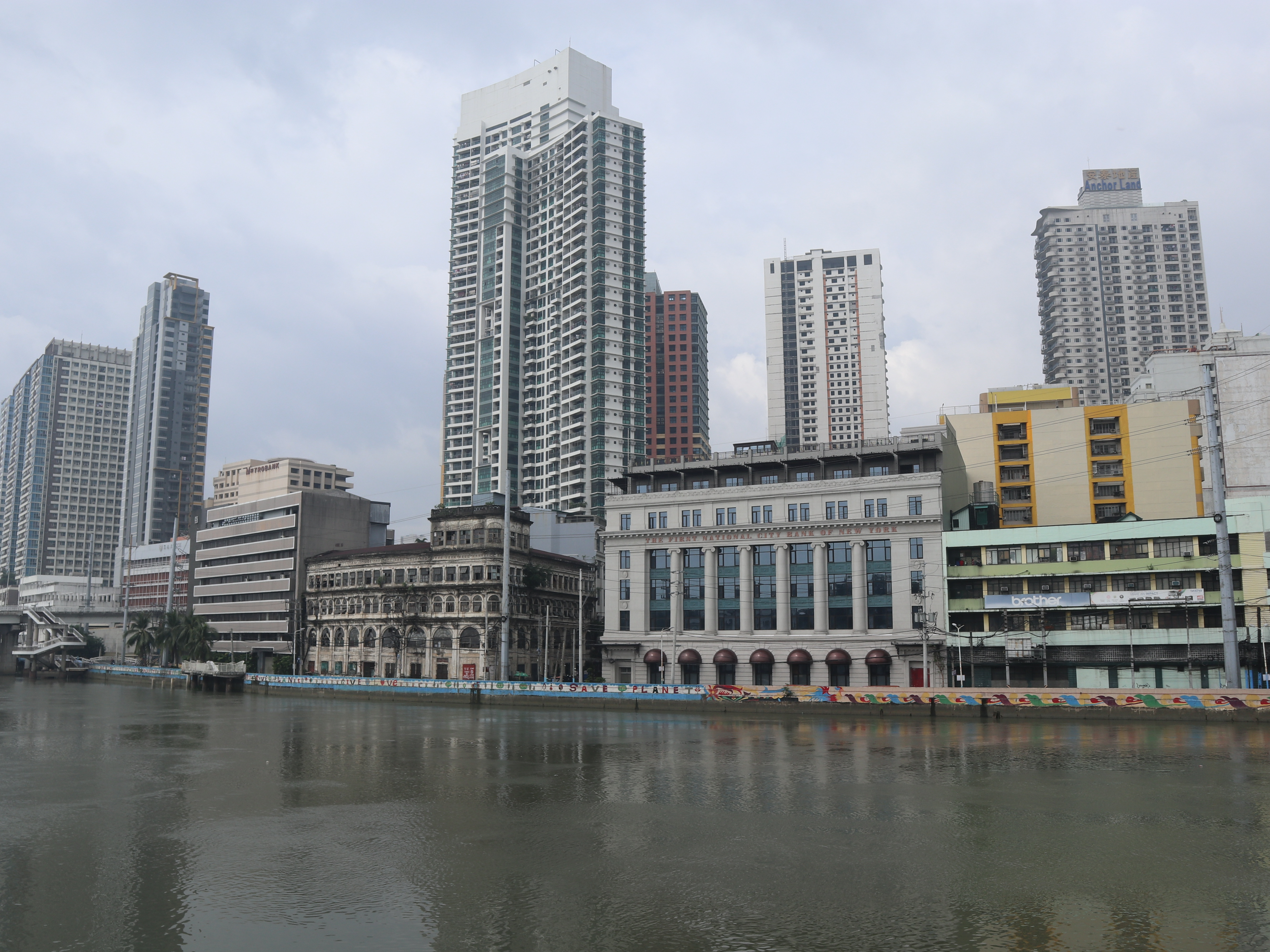
Buildings along the Pasig River in Escolta

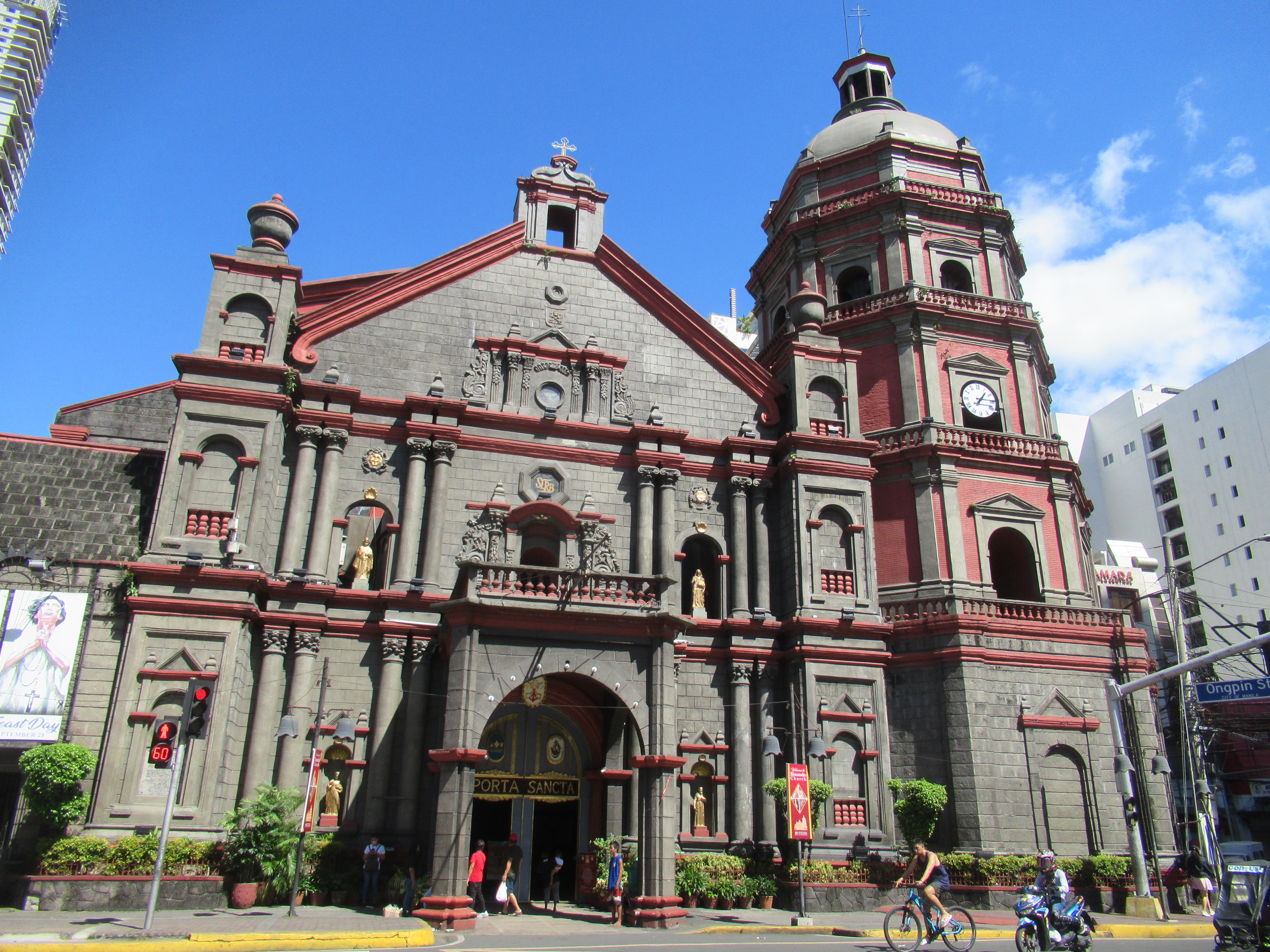
Binondo Church

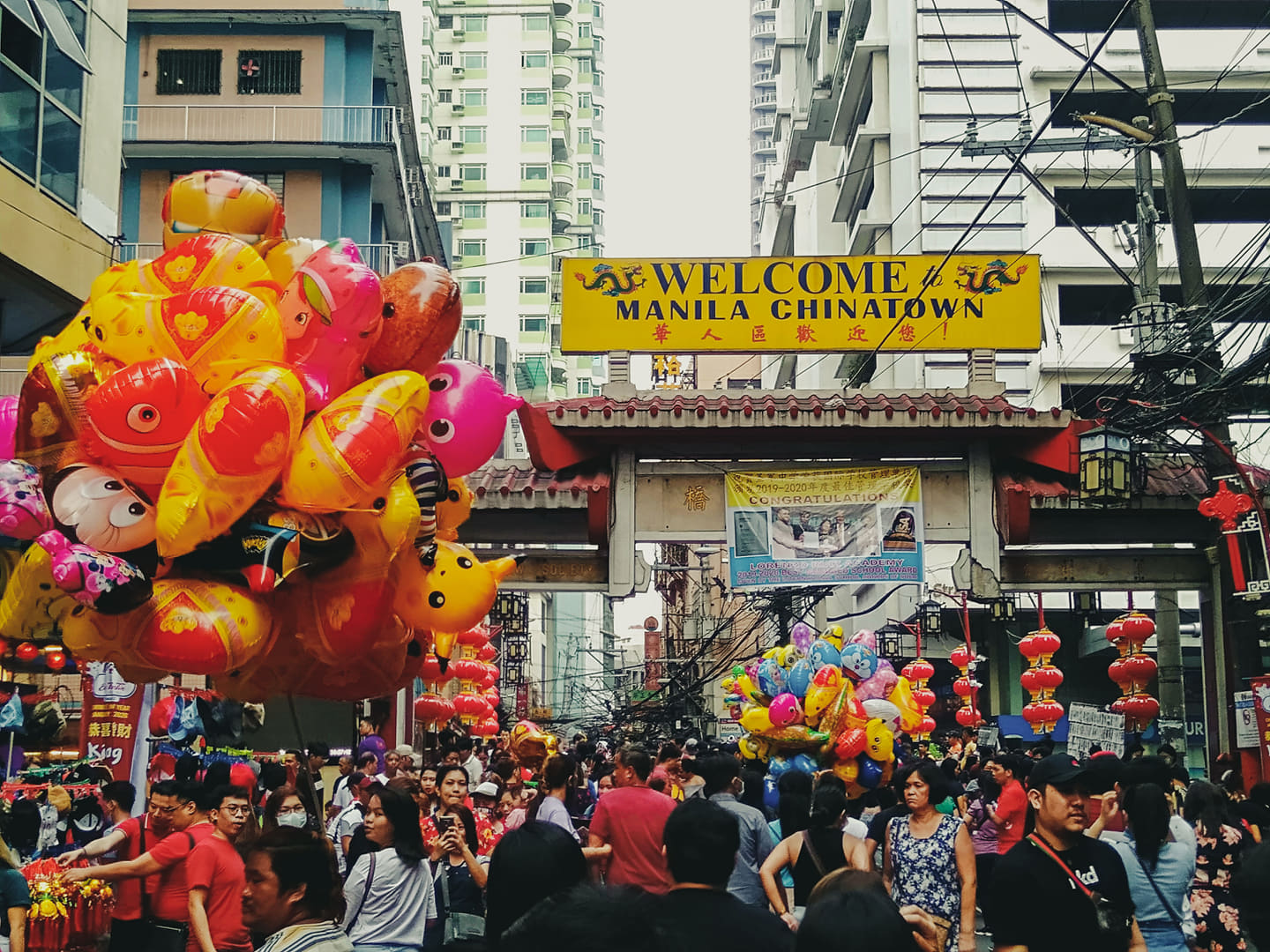
Manila Chinatown Welcome Arch during the Chinese New Year (2020)

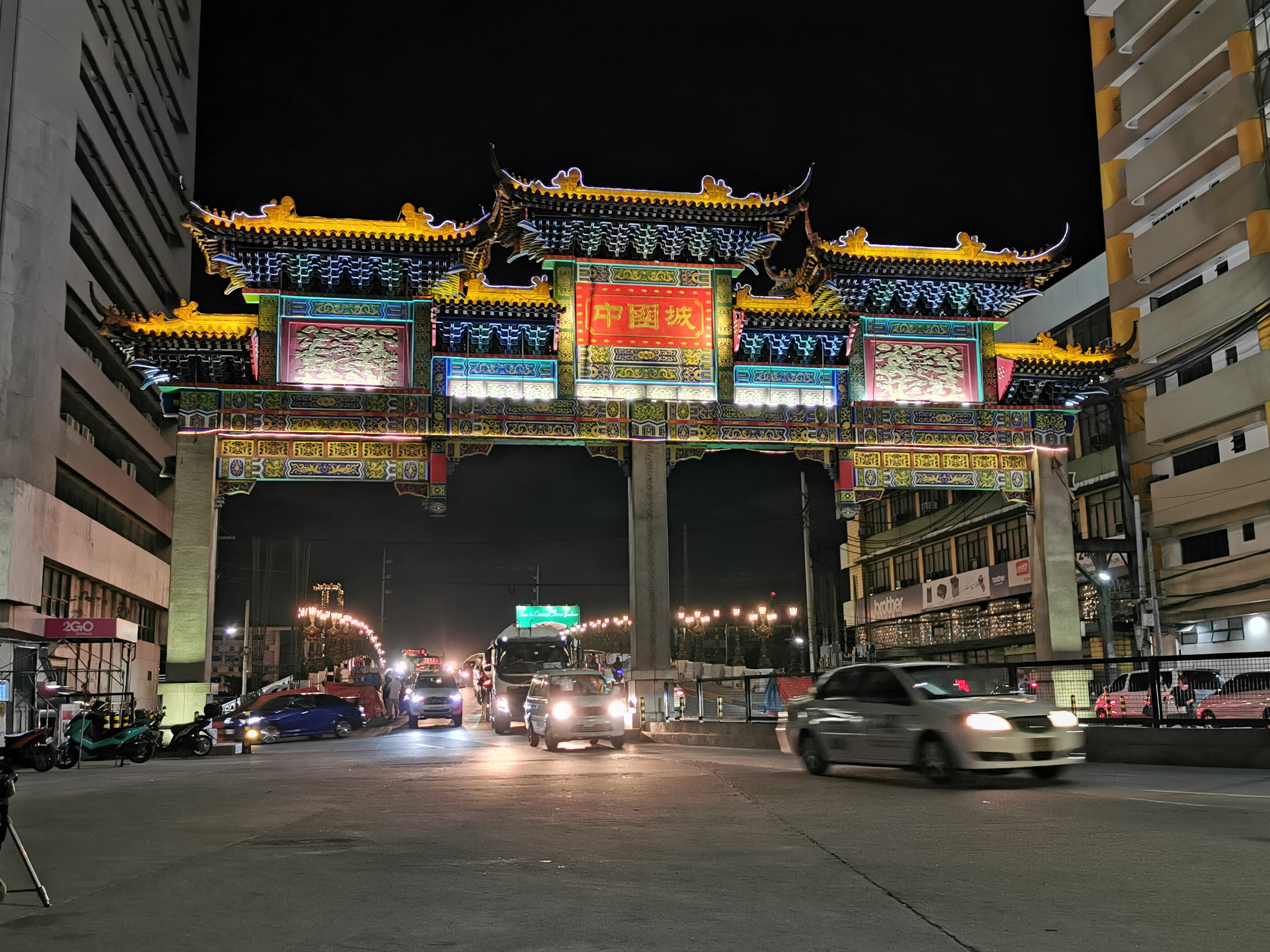
Manila Chinatown Arch

== Notable ==
- Wilbert Tolentino
- Joey De Leon

== See also ==
- El Hogar Filipino Building
- Juan Luna Building
- Davao Chinatown
- Philippine Hokkien
- Hokaglish
- List of ethnic enclaves in Philippine cities

== Sources ==
- Van der Loon, Piet (1966). "The Manila Incunabula and Early Hokkien Studies, Part 1" (PDF). Asia Major. New Series. 12: 1–43. Archived from the original (PDF) on February 24, 2021.
