= El Hogar Building =

Early skyscraper in Manila, Philippines

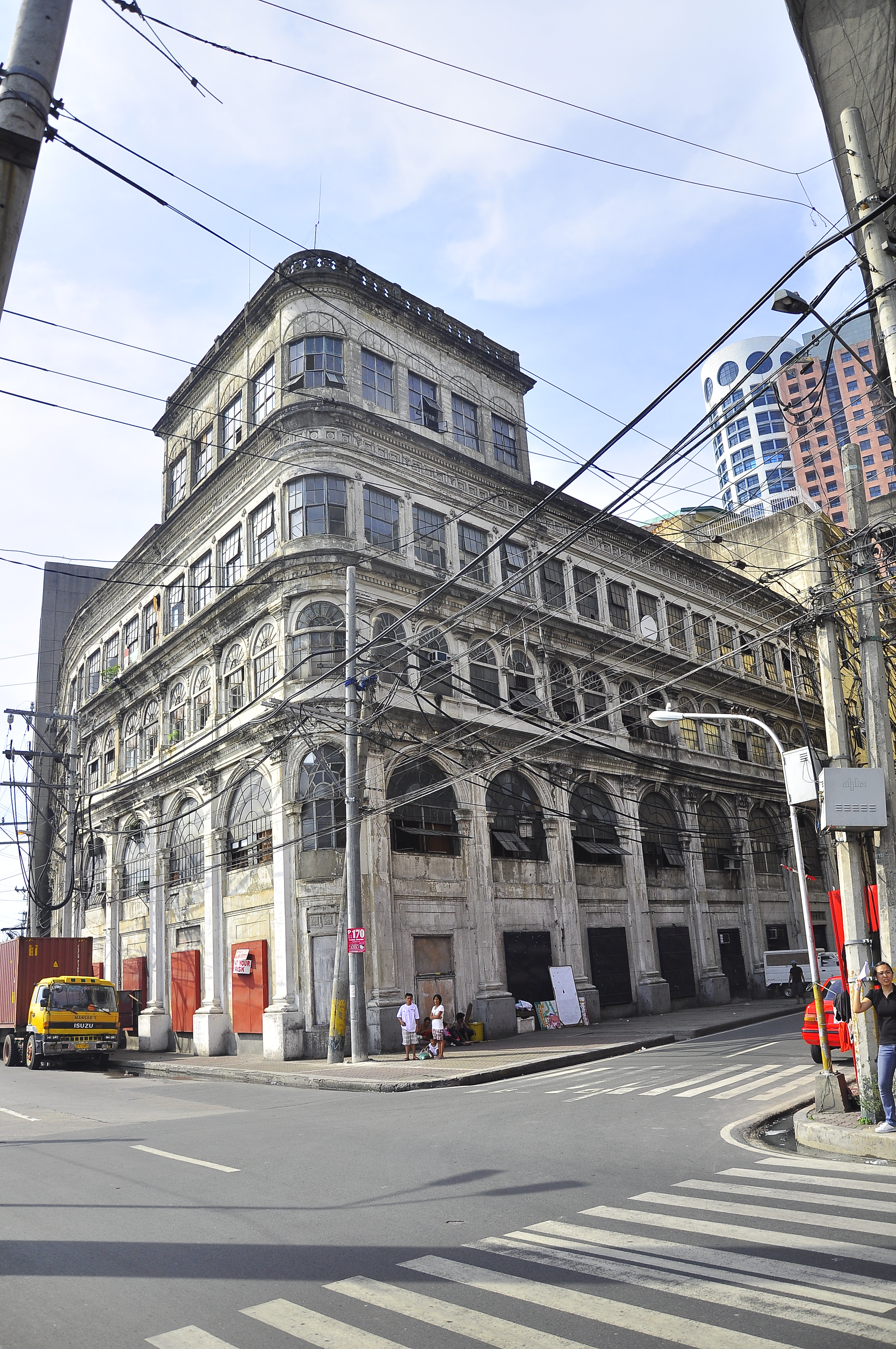
- The building in 2011.

- Location within Manila Location within Metro Manila Location within Luzon Location within Philippines
- Alternative names: El Hogar Filipino Building

General information
- Status: Abandoned
- Architectural style: Neoclassical and Renaissance
- Location: 101 Juan Luna Street corner Muelle de la Industría, Binondo, Manila, Philippines
- Coordinates: 14°35′46.0″N 120°58′32.5″E
- Inaugurated: September 14, 1914

Design and construction
- Architects: Ramon Irureta-Goyena; Francisco Perez-Muñoz

El Hogar Filipino Building, also known simply as El Hogar, is an early skyscraper in Manila, Philippines.

== History ==
The El Hogar Filipino Building, situated at the corner of Juan Luna Street and Muelle de Industria in Binondo, Manila was inaugurated on September 14, 1914. It housed the Sociedad El Hogar Filipino, a financing cooperative founded by Antonio Melian, and the offices of Smith, Bell and Company.

It survived World War II and a number of earthquakes and is one of two remaining American-era structures in the area facing the Pasig River. Right across Calle Juan Luna, on its northern front, is another important edifice, the Pacific Commercial Company Building or commonly known as the First National City Bank Building which was built in 1922.

The value of the building is its architecture, which is a representation of American period design, materials, and construction method. El Hogar Building is a representation of the architecture of business establishments of that era.

In the late 2010s, there were plans to demolish the El Hogar by its new owners The Ritz Premiere Corporation. But no demolition permit was issued.

== Architecture and design ==
The El Hogar Building was designed by Ramon Irureta-Goyena and Francisco Perez-Muñoz. It has of both Neoclassical and Renaissance styles It is largely a three-storey structure but it has a fourth floor on its northwest corner corresponding with the four bays on the both north and west front.
