= Plaza Moraga =

Public square in Binondo, Manila, Philippines

- Public square
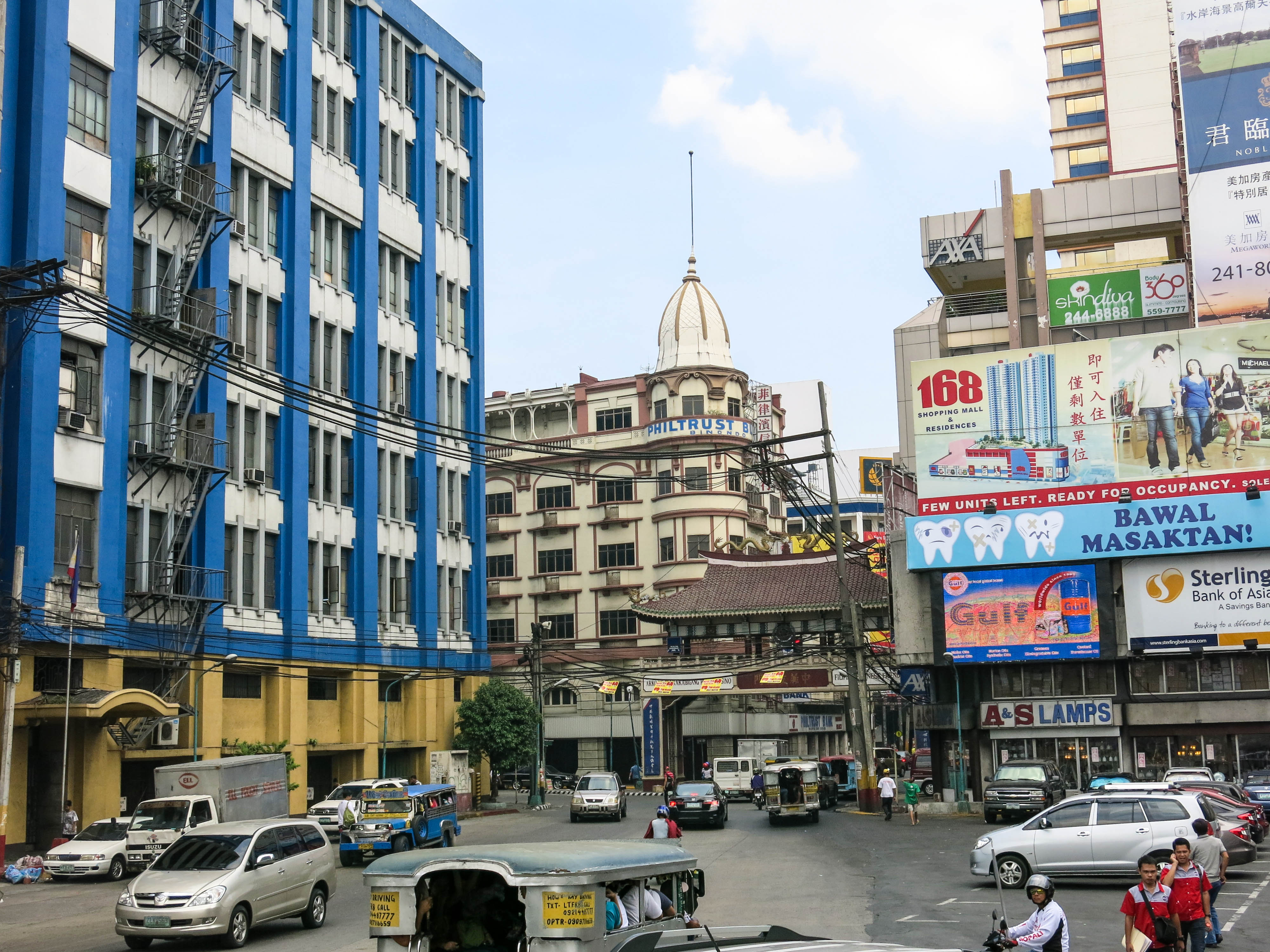
- Plaza Moraga in 2013
- Features: Chinatown Arch
- Dedicated to: Fr. Fernando de Moraga
- Owner: City of Manila
- Location: Binondo, Manila, Philippines
- Interactive map of Plaza Moraga
- Coordinates: 14°35′48″N 120°58′36″E

Plaza Moraga is a public square in National Capital Region of Metro Manila, Philippines. It serves as a gateway to the town of Binondo, Manila's Chinatown.

The Plaza is located at the northern terminus of the Jones Bridge at the west-end of Escolta Street. It was named after Fr. Fernando de Moraga, a Franciscan friar.

== History ==
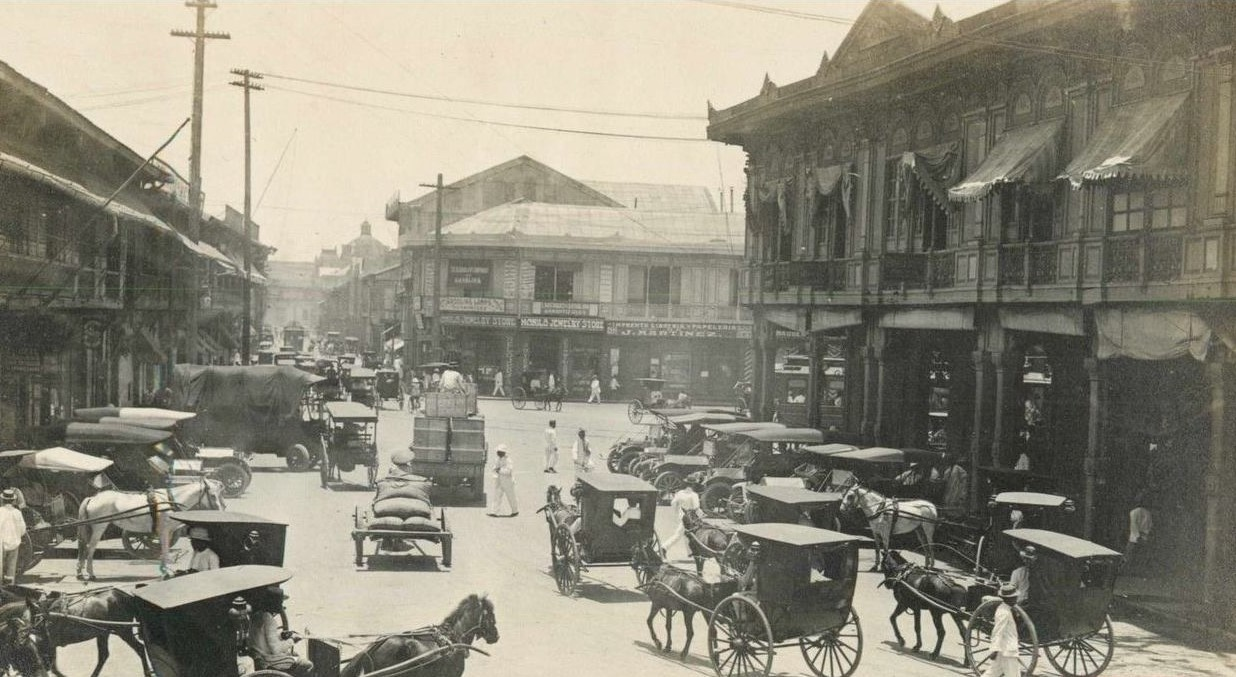
Plaza Moraga in the early 1900's

Plaza Moraga came to develop in the past during the American colonization period where it has been the place of restaurants, commercial establishments and foreign embassies.

One of the main familiar places to visit was Clarke's Cafe, the country's first ice cream shop, which was established in 1899.

=== In recent years ===
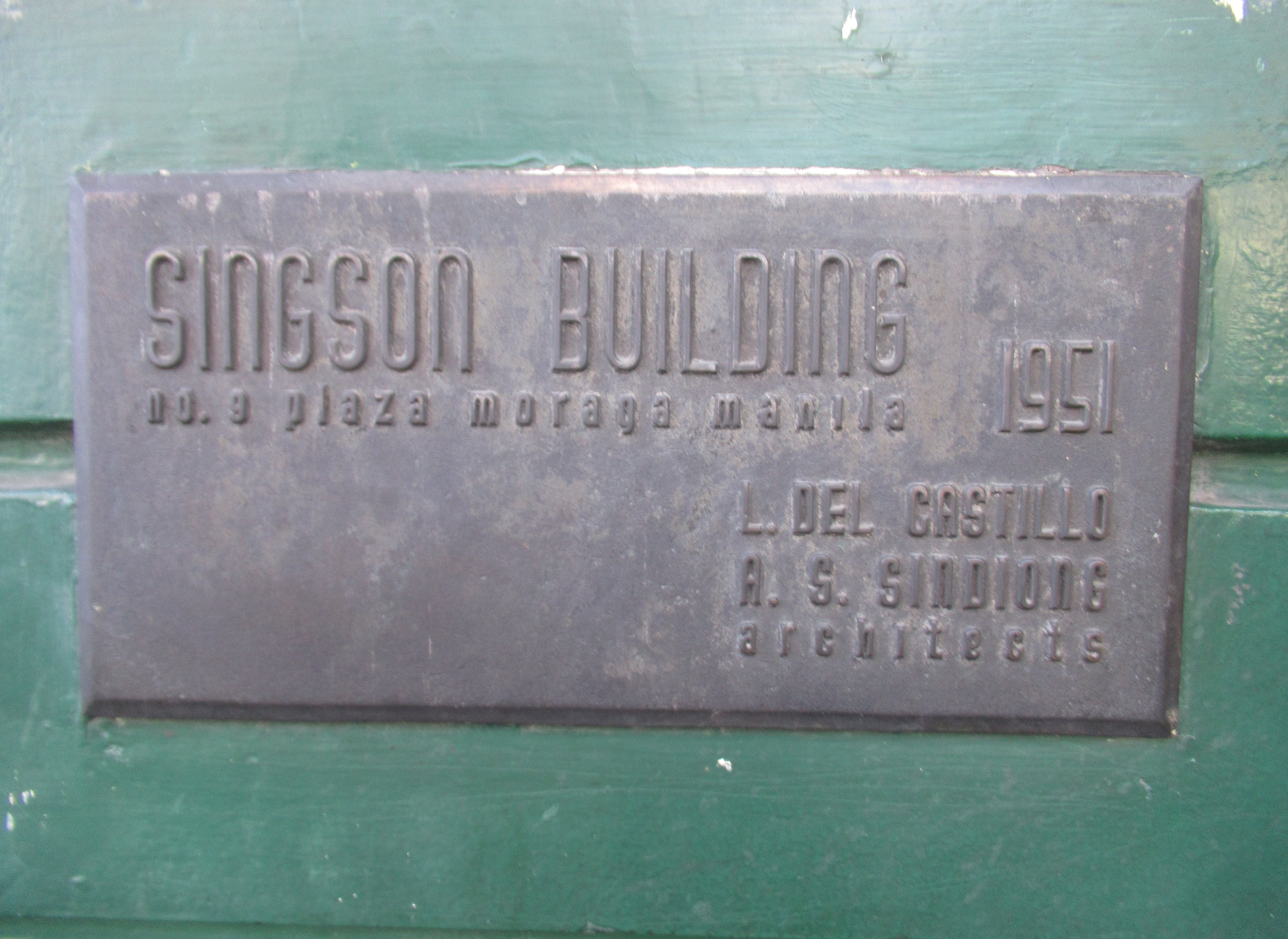
The Singson Building

Plaza Moraga has now become a plaza occupied mostly by cars and a big parking space is designated on one of the corners. There are still commercial buildings surrounding the plaza, including The Original Savory Restaurant, a Chinese restaurant known for their chicken. It succeeded the famed Savory Restaurant that was razed by fire in 2015.

In June 2015, the world's largest Chinatown arch was built on the south side of Plaza Moraga at the entrance to Binondo from Jones Bridge in celebration of the city's 444th founding anniversary as well as the 40th anniversary of Philippines-China diplomatic ties. Funded as a gift from the city government of Guangzhou, it measures 63.8 feet (19.4 m) high and 74 feet (23 m) wide, higher than Washington, D.C. Chinatown's Friendship Archway.

=== Fernando de Moraga ===
"The Venerable" Fernando de Moraga was a Franciscan friar. He was born in Puebla de Alcocer, Extremadura, Spain.

Moraga has visited the Philippines and stayed there for a short while near Plaza Dilao, Paco then continued to some of the towns in the provinces of Bulacan and Laguna before being appointed as a parish priest for Santa Ana in 1607.

He also became the Local's Superior of the San Francisco Convent, some years after his duty in Santa Ana through Intramuros, He was elected as the Chapter president before being delegated to the General Chapter in Spain in 1616. He travelled on barefeet through the Middle East, begging while evangelizing and baptizing along the way, before reaching Spain in 1619.

Fr. Moraga is most famous for convincing King Philip III, through his persuasion and knowledge on the colony, to revoke the decree that included surrendering the Philippines. By the opinion of many historians, if it was not for the Franciscan friar's efforts, the country would have turned out differently.
