= Plaza San Lorenzo Ruiz =

Public square in Binondo, Manila

Plaza San Lorenzo Ruiz 花園口廣場
- Public square
- {{{other_names}}}
- Former names: Plaza Calderón de la Barca, Plaza de Binondo, Plaza Carlos IV
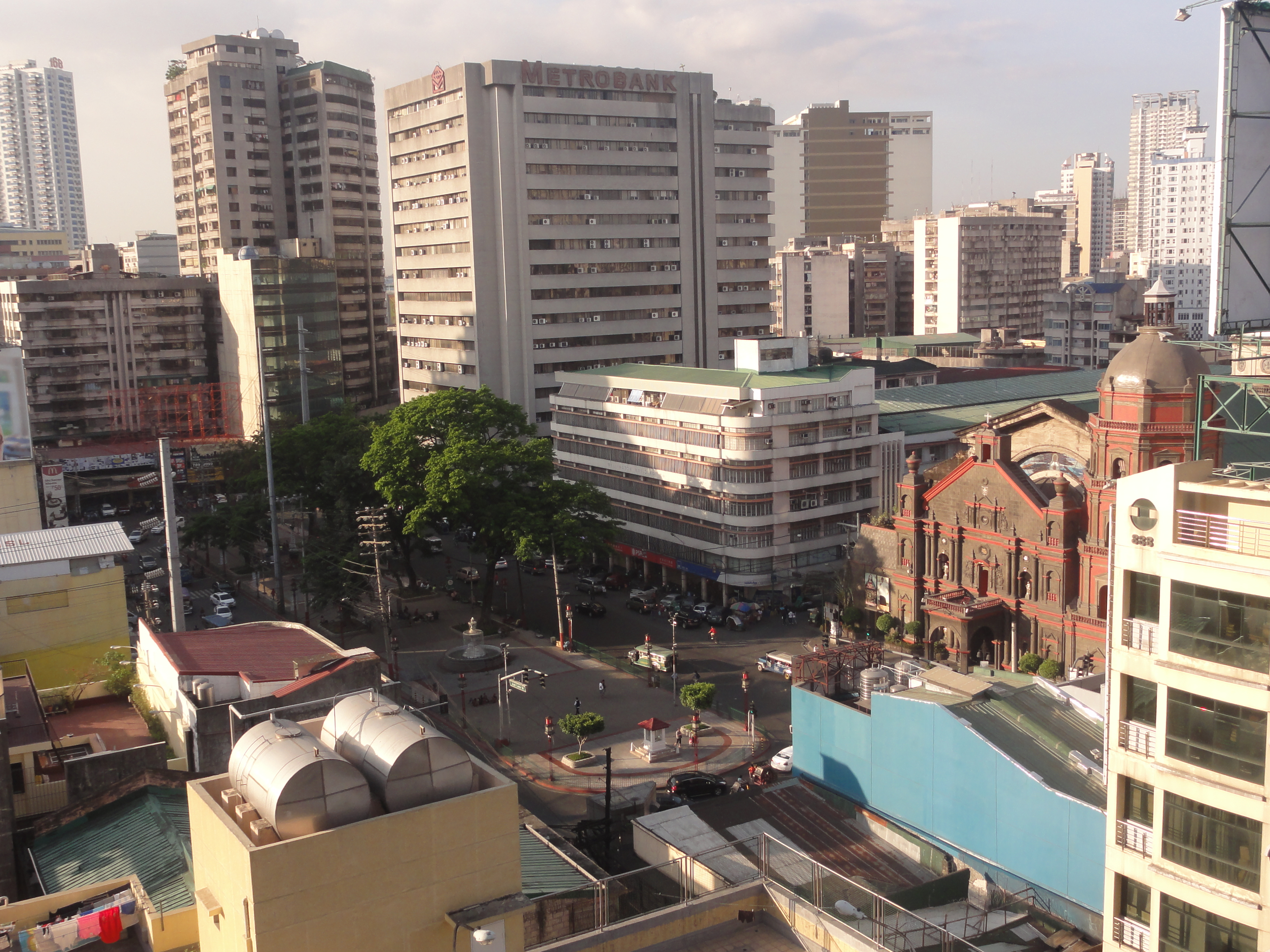
- Plaza San Lorenzo Ruiz is the center of Binondo, and is bounded by the Binondo Church, the district's most notable landmark.
- Dedicated to: Saint Lorenzo Ruiz
- Owner: City of Manila
- Location: Juan Luna Street, Binondo; Manila, Philippines
- Interactive map of Plaza San Lorenzo Ruiz 花園口廣場
- Coordinates: 14°36′01″N 120°58′26″E

Plaza San Lorenzo Ruiz or Plaza Lorenzo Ruiz (traditional Chinese: 花園口廣場; simplified Chinese: 花园口广场; pinyin: Huāyuánkǒu Guǎngchǎng; Pe̍h-ōe-jī: Hoe-hn̂g-kháu Kóng-tiûⁿ; lit. 'at the foot/mouth of the garden') is a major public square in Binondo, Manila, bounded by Quintin Paredes Street (formerly Calle Rosario) to the east and Juan Luna Street (formerly Calle Anloague) to the west, parallel to the Estero de Binondo. It is the plaza that fronts the Minor Basilica of San Lorenzo Ruiz (Binondo Church), one of the main churches of the City of Manila, and is considered the center of Binondo as a whole.

Originally called the Plaza de Binondo, and then Plaza Carlos IV after Charles IV of Spain, the plaza was eventually renamed Plaza Calderón de la Barca (often shortened to Plaza Calderón), after the famous Spanish playwright. It is believed that the plaza may have been renamed after Calderón either by the then-sitting Governor-General, or by the Dominican friars who were at the time running the Binondo Church, who had adored his works. The plaza was renamed after Lorenzo Ruiz, one of the Martyrs of Japan and the protomartyr of the Philippines, on September 12, 1981, by virtue of Batas Pambansa Blg. 133.

== History ==
In 1594, the town of Binondo was established on the northern bank of the Pasig River by then Governor-General Gómez Pérez Dasmariñas as a settlement for Chinese migrants arriving in Manila. With urban planning not as strict as that of Intramuros, compounded by the geography of the newly established settlement which is bounded by numerous streams which drain into the Pasig River, Plaza San Lorenzo Ruiz was created to serve as the largest plaza of the settlement, directly fronting the Binondo Church. Similar to Plaza Moriones in Tondo, the plaza was originally an open grass field.

During the Spanish colonial period, the plaza was a hub for economic activity, and was even described by Teodoro Agoncillo as "one of the most impressive open spaces of old Manila". The plaza was surrounded by trees and tipped with two large fountains, both of which still stand today. With the completion of the Binondo Church in 1854, trade around the area increased, and several large buildings and mansions were built around the plaza. Economic activity continued to grow in Binondo during American rule, and the plaza was a busy center of activity alongside other major plazas in Manila. The plaza was also well-served by Manila's pre-World War II tram network.

While the plaza was spared from the Battle of Manila in 1945, and economic activity in Binondo recovered thereafter, the area around the plaza started declining around the 1960s, when most business activity shifted from Manila to Makati and Cubao in Quezon City. By the 1980s, the plaza (and the area in general) was in serious decline, even becoming a repository for monuments moved from nearby Plaza Cervantes and Plaza Goiti (now Plaza Lacson), which were cleared to make room for parking space. In 1990, the Manila City Council passed an ordinance prohibiting parking around the immediate vicinity of the plaza in a bid to alleviate chronic traffic congestion.

In 2005, Plaza San Lorenzo Ruiz was redeveloped by the Manila city government during the tenure of Lito Atienza, with help from the Metrobank Foundation, which donated ₱3 million for the project. Another redevelopment was completed in 2014, under the tenure of Joseph Estrada.

== Architecture ==
=== Design and layout ===
Plaza San Lorenzo Ruiz has an area of 1,200 square meters (13,000 sq ft), which unlike other plazas in Manila is shaped like an ellipse, with a fountain on each end. The plaza is paved with granite tiles and multicolored interlocking concrete bricks, similar to Plaza Miranda in Quiapo. Park benches have been installed around the plaza's perimeter, and a number of royal palm trees have been planted in the plaza's center, complementing a number of existing narra trees. The plaza is lit at night with 42 promenade lampposts, 32 floodlights and 24 uplights that have been installed at strategic points around the area. Previously, a perimeter fence circled around the plaza: this was removed in the 2005 redevelopment.

A number of historical markers have been installed at the plaza, two of which are centuries-old. The most notable marker is a statue of Lorenzo Ruiz which in the 2005 rehabilitation was repositioned to face the Binondo Church. Behind the statue of Lorenzo Ruiz is a memorial to Chinese Filipino victims of World War II erected in 1995 by the Confederation of Filipino Chinese Veterans. At the northern end of the plaza is an obelisk dating back to 1916 which was erected in memory of Tomas Pinpin, the first Filipino printer, which was moved to the plaza from Plaza Cervantes in 1979, when it was cleared to make room for more parking space. At the southern end of the plaza is a monument to Joaquin Santa Marina, the founder of the La Insular Cigar and Cigarette Factory (see below).

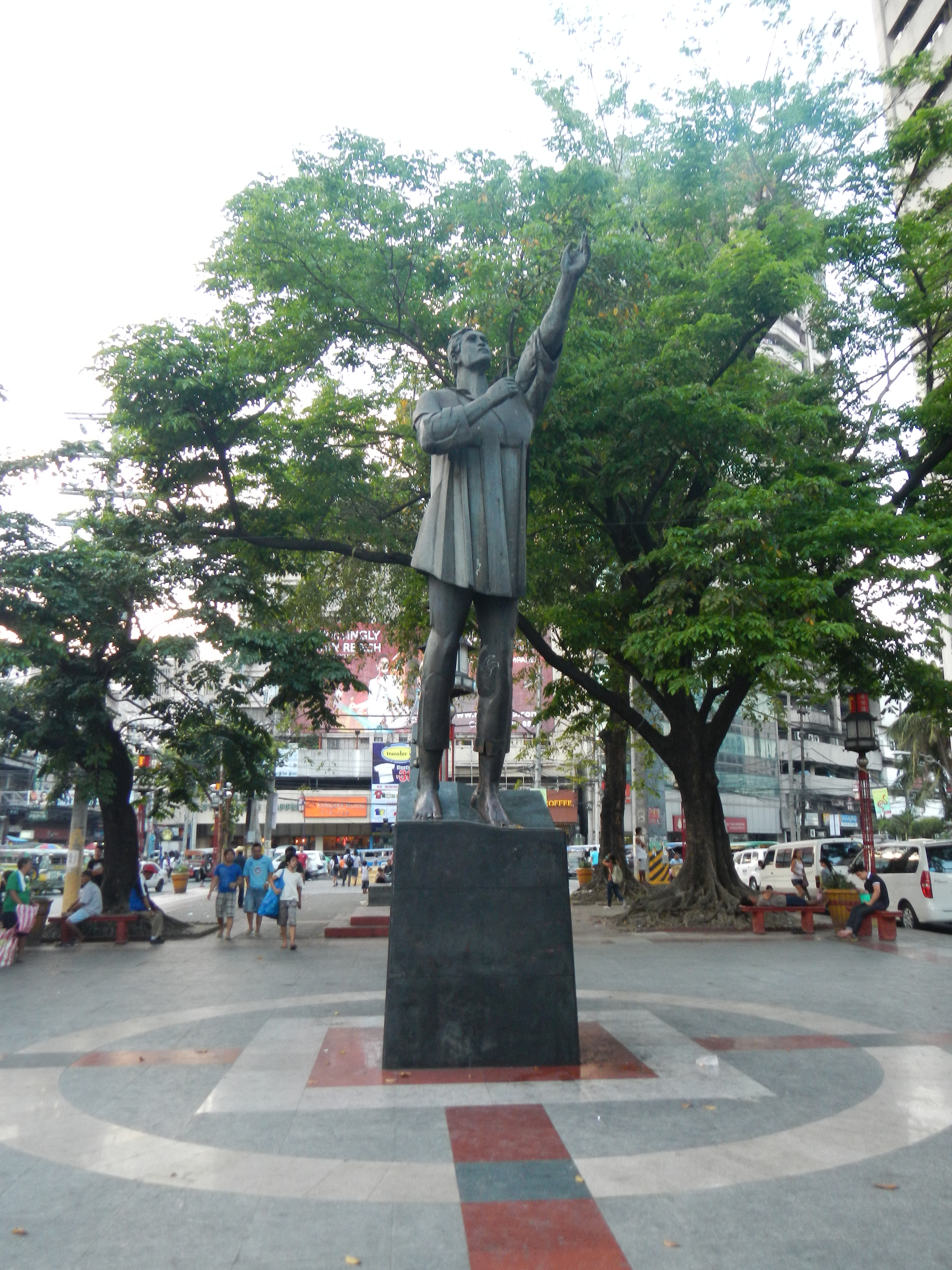
Plaza San Lorenzo Ruiz is named after Lorenzo Ruiz, whose statue stands at the middle of the square.

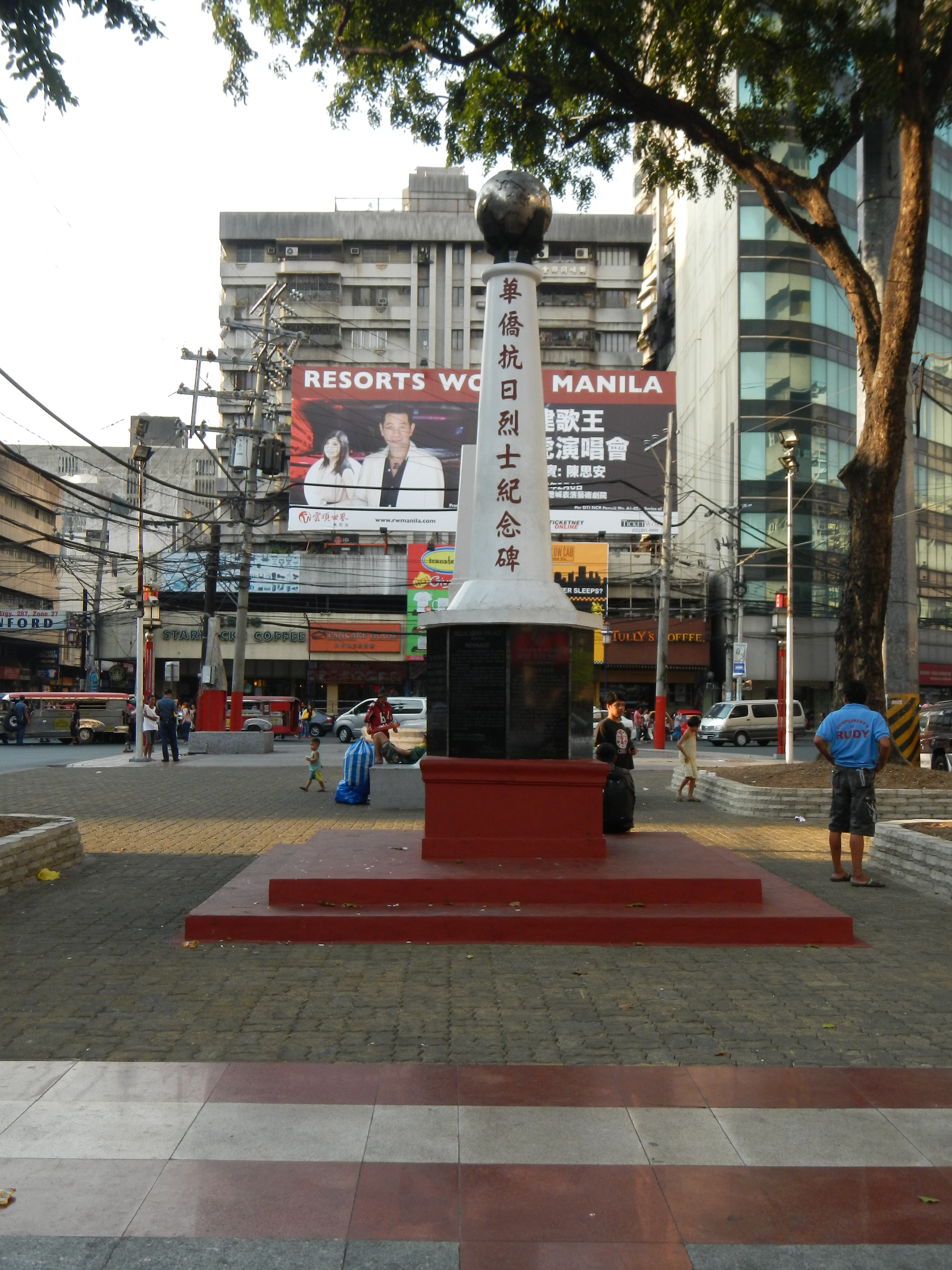
A memorial to Chinese-Filipino victims of World War II erected in 1995 by the Confederation of Filipino Chinese Veterans

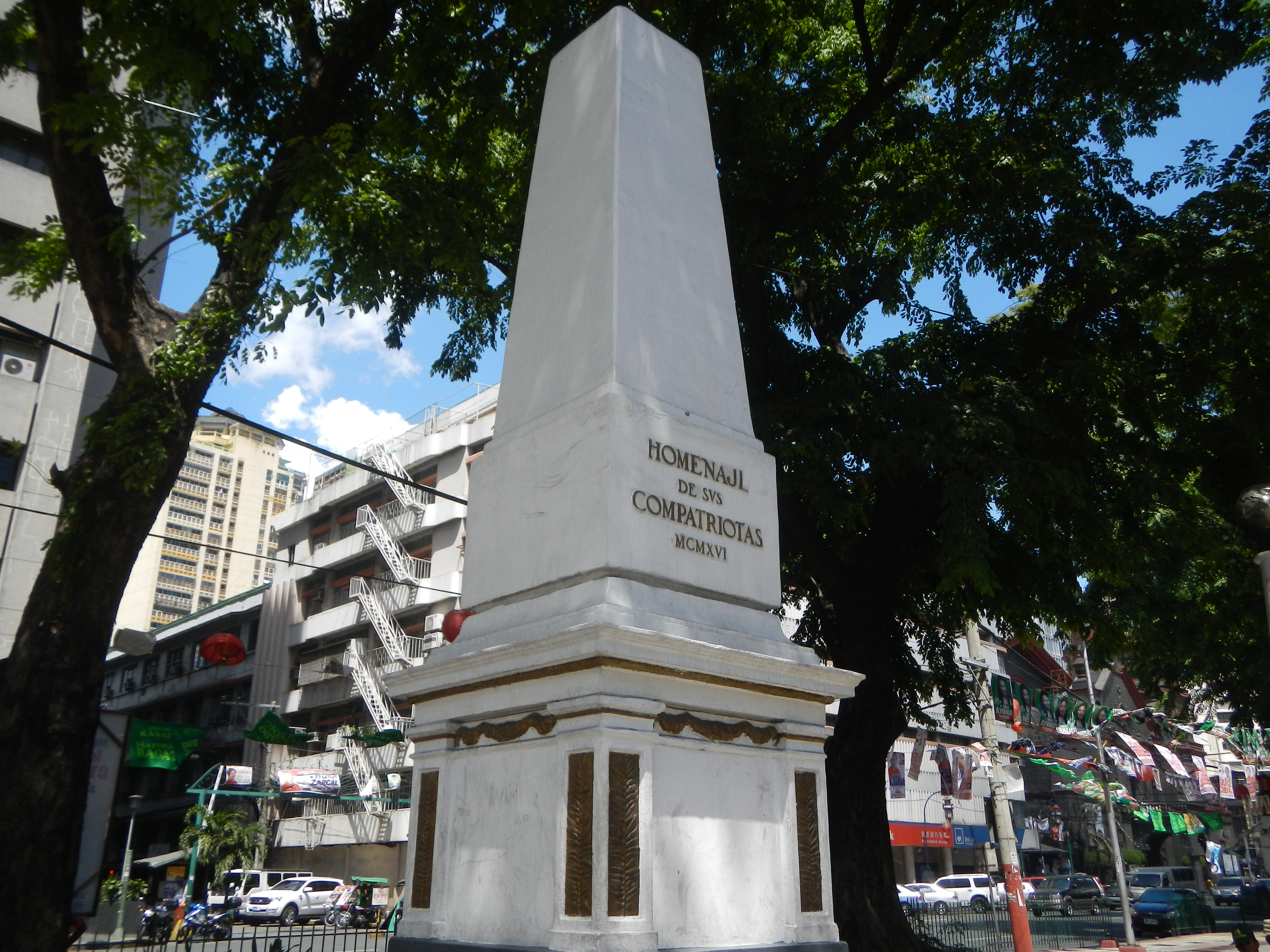
The back part of the obelisk dating back to 1916 which was erected in memory of Tomás Pinpin, the first Filipino printer, which was moved to the plaza from Plaza Cervantes in 1979

=== Surrounding buildings and structures ===
Aside from the Binondo Church, a number of other notable structures are (or were) located within the vicinity of Plaza San Lorenzo Ruiz. The largest building to have been built around the plaza was the La Insular Cigar and Cigarette Factory, which was opened in 1883 after the lifting of the Spanish tobacco monopoly three years earlier. Destroyed by fire during the Battle of Manila, the site is now occupied by the Wellington Building, which was once the headquarters of the Metropolitan Bank and Trust Company (Metrobank), founded by Chinese Filipino businessman George Ty, and still home to the Binondo offices of a number of Metrobank-affiliated companies. Beside it was the Hotel de Oriente, then the most popular hotel in Manila, where José Rizal stayed in Room 22, and which also served as the erstwhile headquarters of the National Library of the Philippines. While the Hotel de Oriente, unlike the La Insular Cigar and Cigarette Factory, was only partially destroyed in the Battle of Manila, it was demolished afterward, and the site is now occupied by Tytana Plaza, home to the current Binondo offices of Metrobank. A replica of the Hotel de Oriente today stands in the Las Casas Filipinas de Acuzar complex in Bagac, Bataan.

On the northern end of the plaza is a building formerly housing the Binondo offices of Bank of the Philippine Islands (BPI), which is currently home to the branches of Jollibee, Chowking and Greenwich. While the Binondo branch has moved to a taller building next door, at the corner with Reina Regente Street, BPI currently maintains its main Binondo offices at the BPI Building along Quintin Paredes Street.

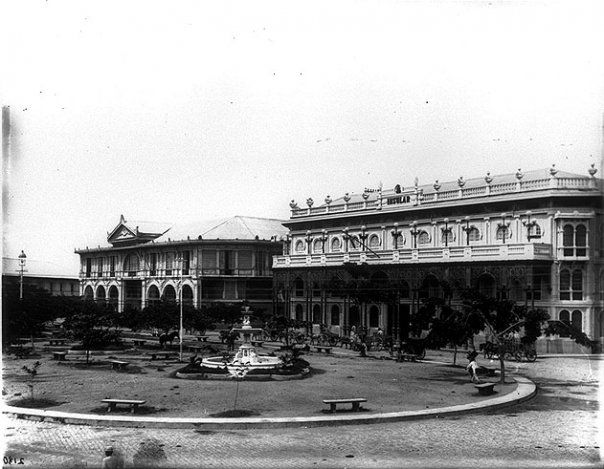
Plaza Calderón de la Barca in 1899 with Hotel de Oriente and La Insular Building.

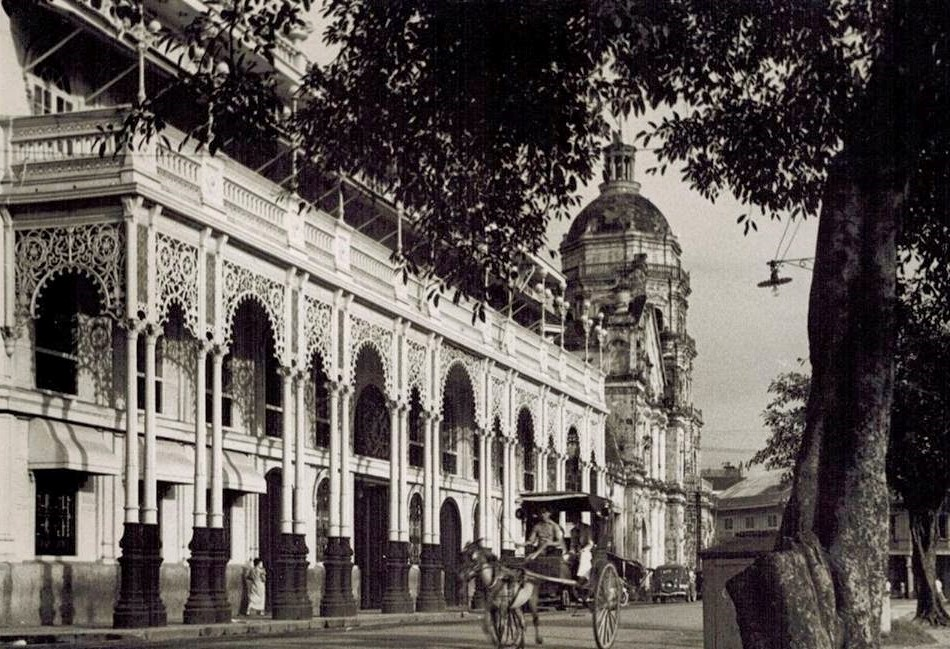
La Insular Cigar and Cigarette Factory was a famous landmark in Binondo before the war.

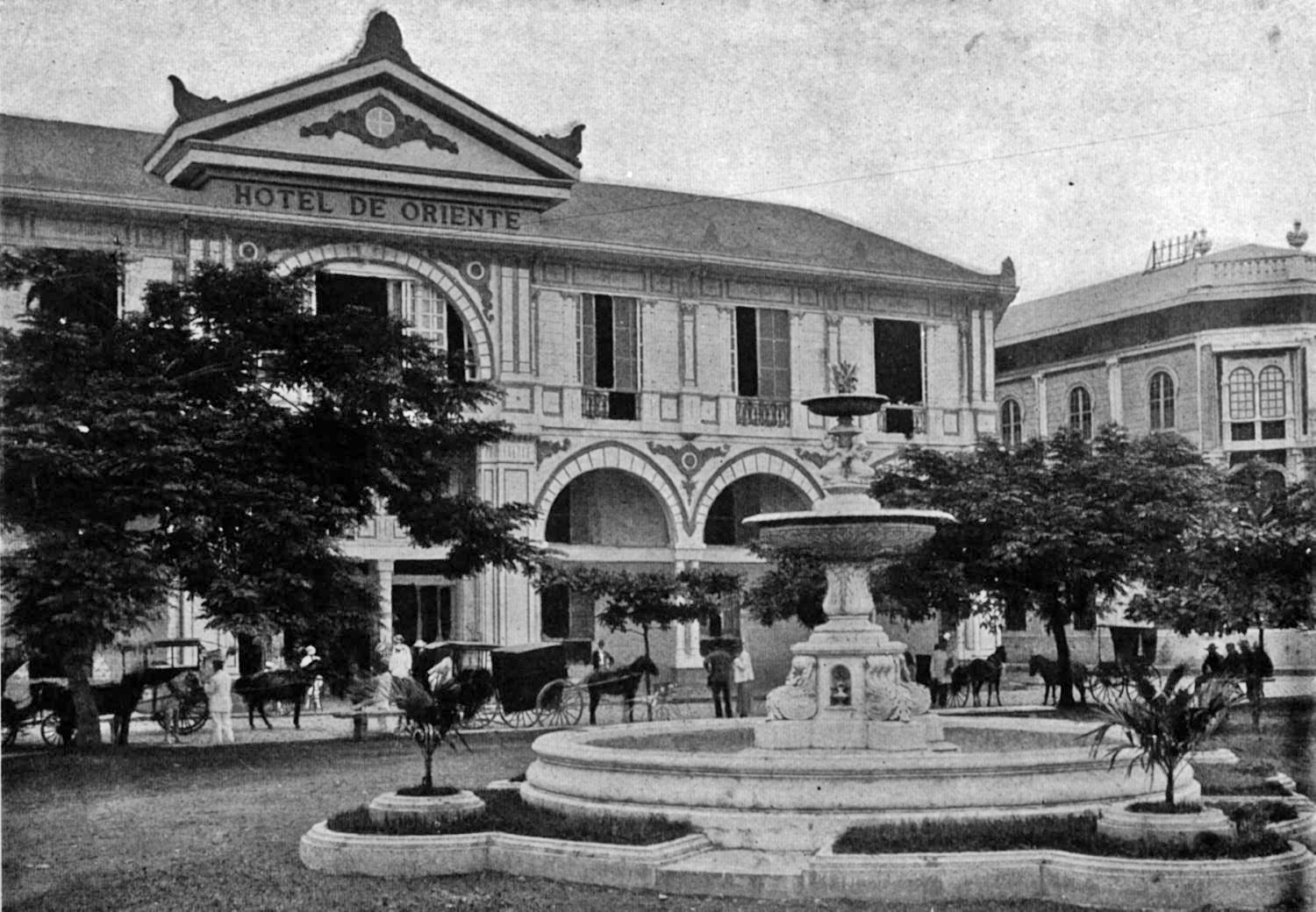
Hotel de Oriente, then the most popular hotel in Manila, where José Rizal stayed in Room 22

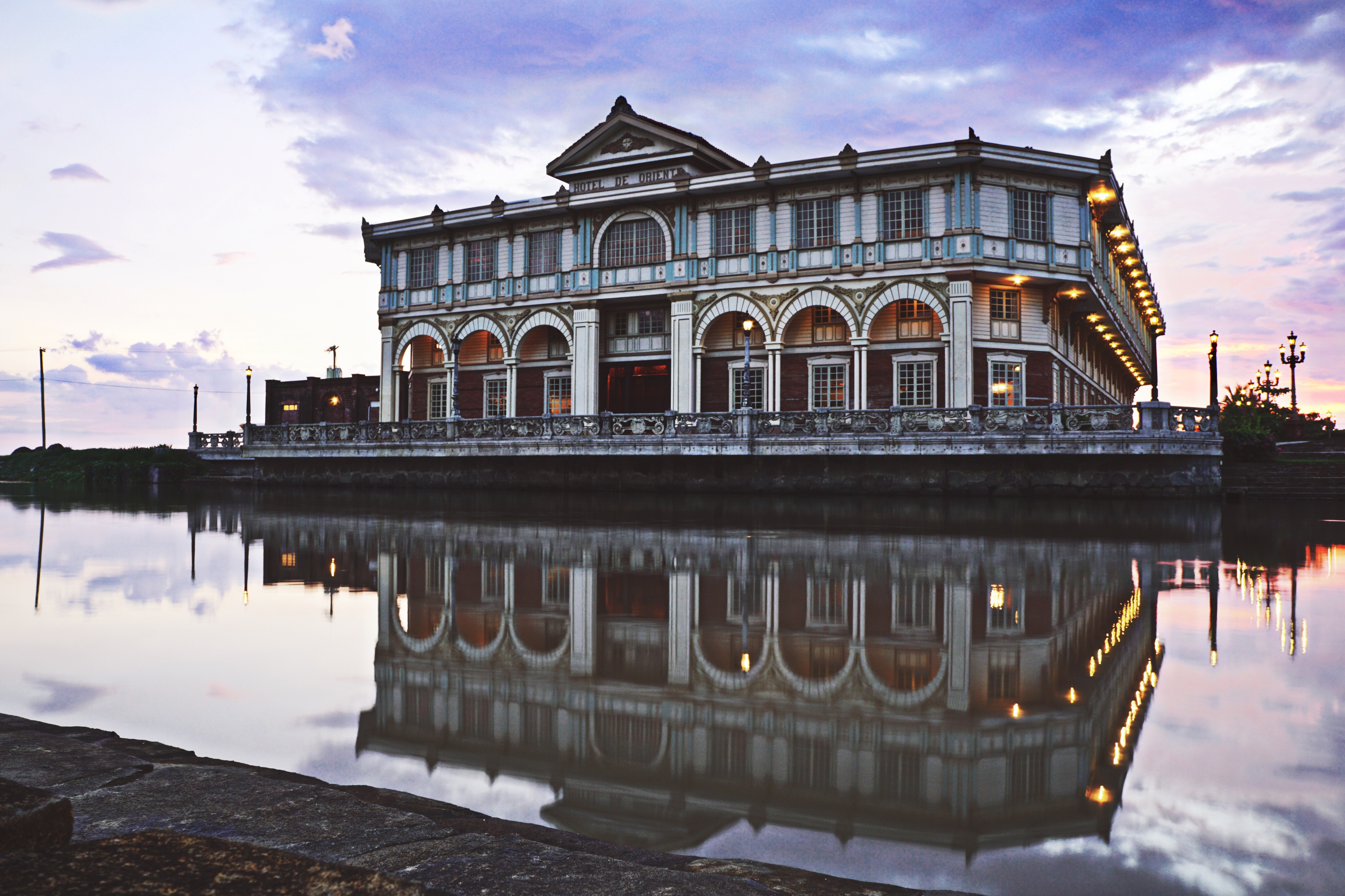
Hotel de Oriente replica at the Las Casas Filipinas de Acuzar

== In literature ==
Plaza San Lorenzo Ruiz is mentioned in Chapter 4 of José Rizal's novel Noli Me Tángere, where Crisostomo Ibarra reaches the plaza and its vicinity after attending Captain Tiago's dinner party at his house on Calle Anloague. While walking around the vicinity and noticing that very little has changed in Manila while he was studying in Europe, Lieutenant Guevarra reveals to Ibarra what happened to his father, Don Rafael, who Father Dámaso slandered during the dinner.

== See also ==
- Binondo Church
- List of parks in Manila
- List of city squares
