= Paul de la Gironière =

French traveler

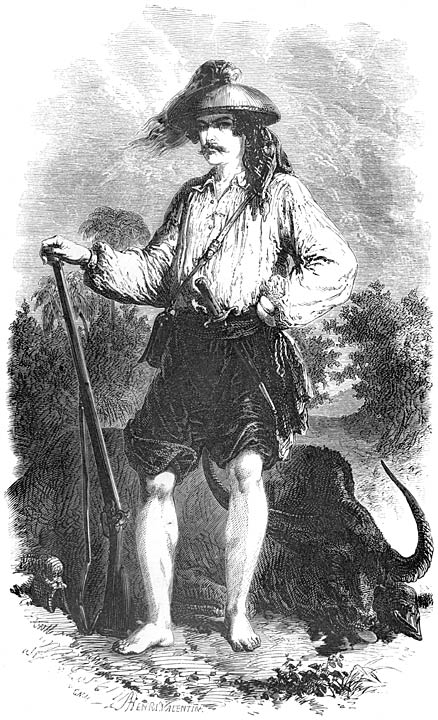
- Born: Paul Proust de la Gironière; August 17, 1797; Vertou, Nantes, Kingdom of France
- Died: March 23, 1862 (aged 64); Calauan, La Laguna, Captaincy General of the Philippines
- Occupation: Traveler

Paul Proust de la Gironière (August 17, 1797 – March 23, 1862) was a French traveler from Vertou, Nantes who lived in the Spanish Philippines and wrote about his experiences there. He arrived in the Philippines in 1820 and established the Jala Jala hacienda in Morong (present-day Rizal province). Among the activities that he undertook were hog raising and planting indigo, sugarcane, and coffee.

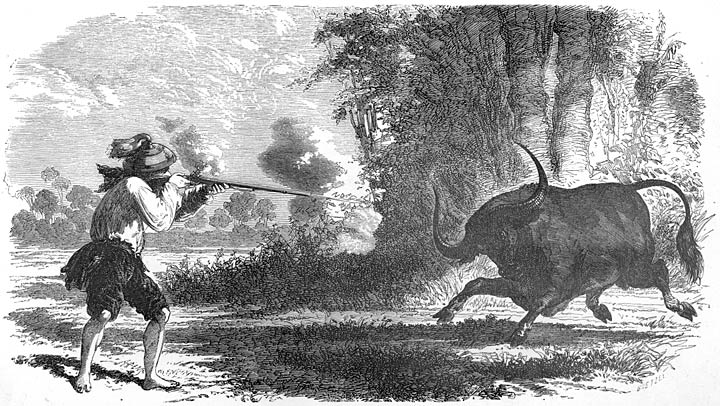
Paul de la Gironière killing a buffalo, early 1800s.

On June 23, 1837, Gironiere's efforts in the field of horticulture and agriculture were recognized by the Real Sociedad Economica de Amigos del Pais de Pilipinas — winning 1,000 pesos for raising 6,000 coffee plants. He ensured good relations with the clergy by building a church; and with his workers by building cockpits in the estate.

== Family ==
His father was a noble captain ruined by the French Revolution who died in Vertou, near from Nantes.

== Works ==
- Vingt Années aux Philippines (1853)
- Aventures d'un gentilhomme breton aux îles Philippines (1855)
- Moeurs indiennes et quelques pensées philosophiques pendant un voyage à Majaijai (1862)
