= Filipino-Chinese Friendship Arch =

Chinatown monument

- Arko ng Pagkakaibigang Pilipino-Tsino 中菲友誼門
- The new arch in front, with the old arch behind

General information
- Type: Paifang arch
- Location: Binondo, Manila, Philippines
- Coordinates: 14°35′49″N 120°58′36″E
- Opening: 1970s (old); June 23, 2015 (new)
- Operator: Manila City Hall

The Filipino-Chinese Friendship Arch refers to two neighboring paifang (a type of arch) in Binondo, a Chinatown in Manila. The first was built in the 1970's to mark the establishment of diplomatic relations between the Philippines and the People's Republic of China. The second was built as part of a tourism-focused redevelopment initiative in 2015, and was designed to be the largest Chinatown gate in the world.

== First arch ==
The first arch in 2019

Binondo is reportedly the world's oldest Chinatown. It was established in 1594 to house Chinese immigrants to the Spanish East Indies.

The first arch was constructed in the 1970s alongside three others placed around Binondo. Their construction was funded by the local Chinese Filipino community to mark the establishment of diplomatic relations between the Philippines and the People's Republic of China. These paifang became viewed as symbols of Binondo.

The first arch features text in three languages: Arko ng Pagkakaibigang Pilipino-Tsino in Filipino, 中菲友誼門 (Zhōng fēi yǒuyì mén) which translates to "friendship between the Philippines and China" in Chinese script, and the English "Filipino-Chinese Friendship Arch".

== Second arch ==
Manila Mayor Joseph Estrada created the Manila Chinatown Development Council to redevelop Binondo in order to attract more tourists. Rehabilitation plans proposed by the council in January 2014 included the development of a new Filipino-Chinese Friendship Arch. On February 18, 2015, the Manila government announced that a new arch was being built in China, and was scheduled to be sent to the Philippines in March. It was designed to be the world's largest Chinatown arch. Construction in Binondo started in April, with the aim of completion before Manila Day on June 24.

The new arch was inaugurated by Estrada on June 23, whose office stated that it hoped the arch would help repair strained relationships with China. The arch's design evokes three pagodas. It has a total height of 63.8 feet (19.4 m), and a width of 74 feet (23 m), larger than the previous record holder in Washington D.C. Its foundations were built 30 metres (98 ft) deep to reduce potential damage from earthquakes. The timing of the inauguration aligned with both the 444th anniversary of the founding of Manila and the 40th anniversary of Philippine–People's Republic of China relations.

The new arch was positioned in front of the existing arch, slightly closer to Jones Bridge at the end of Escolta Street. According to the Mayor's office, the new arch was not meant to obscure the old arch, and its position would more clearly indicate that Escolta Street was included within the Chinatown. The new arch has been referred to by names including "Chinese Goodwill Arch", "Binondo Chinatown Arch", and "New Binondo Chinatown Arch".

The cost of the new arch was variously reported to be P28 million paid for by the China Energy Fund Committee, a non-profit think tank, or P22.5 million, paid for by the city government of Guangzhou. A representative of the city's foreign affairs office attended the inauguration, alongside Estrada and Chinese Ambassador Zhao Jianhua.

Some members of Manila's Chinese Filipino community, including the director of the Bahay Tsinoy museum, view the design of the new arch as strictly Chinese, rather than reflecting the Chinese Filipino community's more blended heritage. The new arch also only includes the word 中國城 (Zhōngguó chéng), the Chinese script for "Chinatown", without a message of friendship like that of the old arch. Some in the local community view the use of "Chinatown" as emphasizing the country of China, whereas they would have preferred 华人区 (華人區; Huárén qū), which emphasizes ethnicity.

As part of a new tourism redevelopment plan, 800 lights were added to the arch before the 2022 Mid-Autumn Festival. The refurbished arch was reopened by Manila Mayor Honey Lacuna on September 9.
