= Juan Luna Building =

Historic building in Binondo, Manila, Philippines

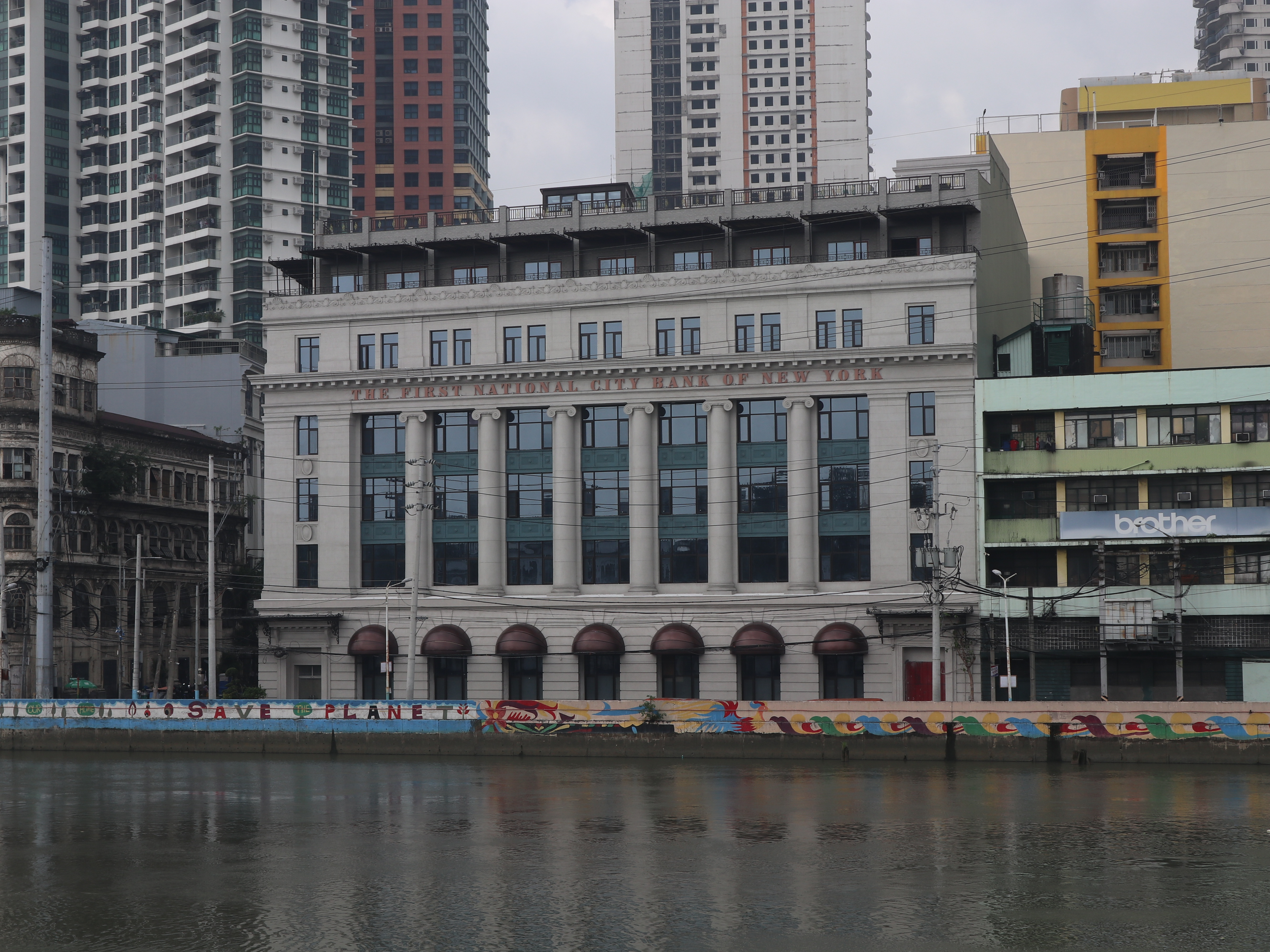
- Building facade as seen from the Pasig River
- Former names: Pacific Commercial Company Building; First National City Bank; Ayala Building (1940–1959)
- Alternative names: Juan Luna Plaza; Juan Luna e-Services Building

General information
- Location: 102 Juan Luna Street cor. Muelle de la Industria, Binondo, Manila, Philippines
- Coordinates: 14.5961°N 120.9761°E
- Completed: July 1922; 104 years ago
- Inaugurated: November 13, 1922; 103 years ago
- Renovated: 2007; 19 years ago
- Cost: ₱2 million

Technical details
- Floor count: 5
- Grounds: 1,800 m^{2} (19,000 sq ft)

Design and construction
- Architecture firm: Murphy, McGill and Hamlin

Juan Luna Building (also known as the Juan Luna Plaza) is a historic building located in Binondo, Manila, Philippines. It was also known as the Pacific Commercial Company Building, First National City Bank Building, and the Ayala Building.

== History ==
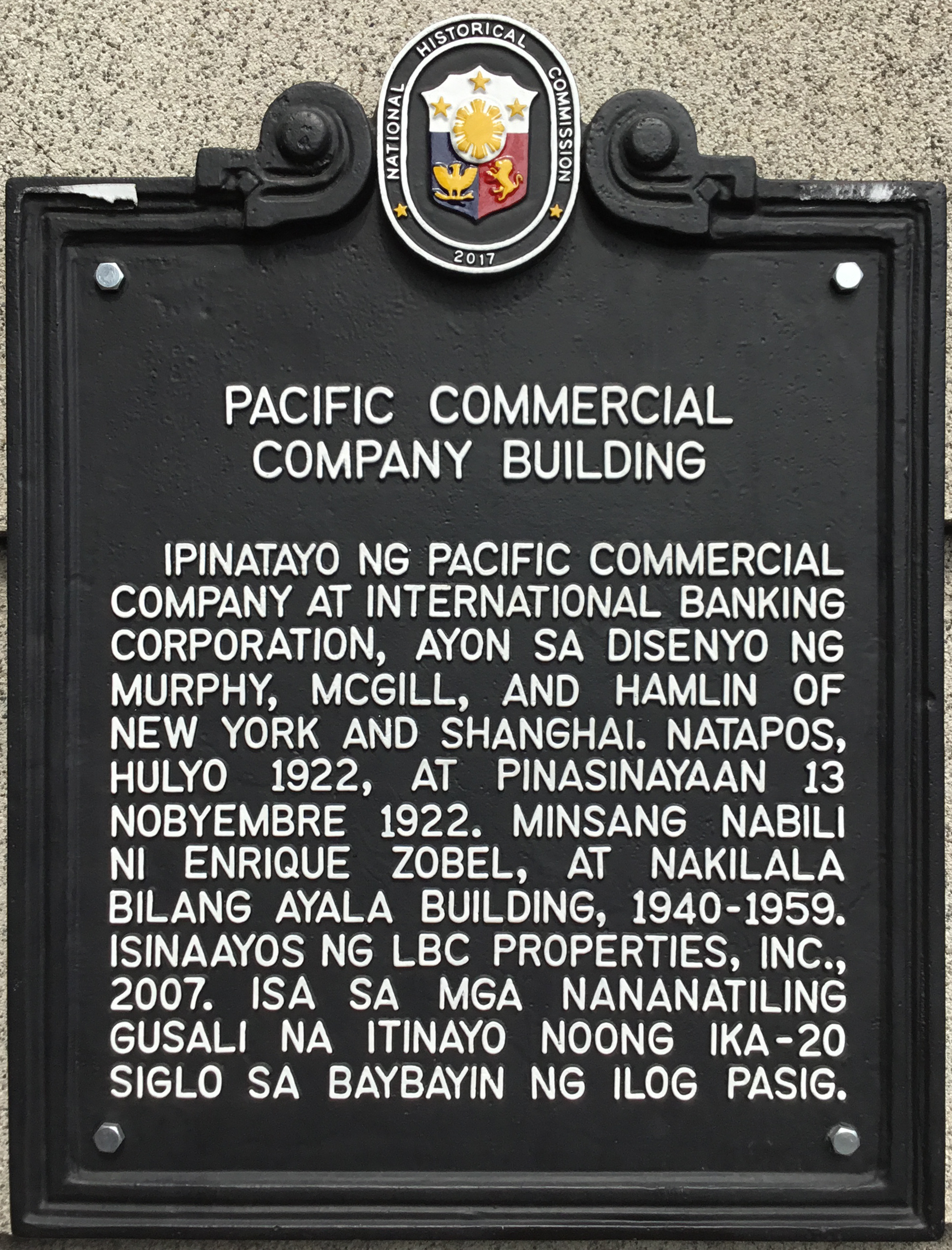
A National Historical Commission of the Philippines historical marker of the building

The Juan Luna Building was built as the Pacific Commercial Company Building in the 1920s. The construction of the building was finished by July 1922 and was inaugurated November 13, 1922. The building was later bought by Enrique J. Zobel and was known as the "Ayala Building" from 1940 to 1959. The LBC Properties Inc. led a renovation of the building in 2007. The First National City Bank also occupied the building.

In 2009, the building was bought by businessman Carlos Araneta who planned to the building to host a business process outsourcing company. The building underwent renovation in 2012 and was meant to be named as the Juan Luna e-Services Building. The facade of the building was preserved. However, lack of investors hindered Araneta's plan and the Juan Luna Building was purposed as a mixed-used building that also serves as a living museum.

=== 2018 fire ===
Past midnight of May 28, 2018, a fire broke out at the nearby Land Management Bureau Building. By 8:00 AM (PST +8:00), the fire has reached the Juan Luna Building. The third floor and portions of the fourth floor of the Juan Luna Building were affected by the fire. The 150 Plaza Cervantes building and the Moraga Mansion were also affected by the fire which was put out around 4:00 PM. The incident is suspected to be caused by arson due to the timing of the start of the fire.

The National Archives of the Philippines office hosted in the Juan Luna Building was affected by the fire although the agency stated that no historical documents were burnt since it keeps these in their offices in Paco and Ermita.

== Architecture and design ==
The five-storey Juan Luna Building was designed by American architects Murphy, McGill and Hamlin of New York City and Shanghai, and was completed at a cost of two million pesos.

Occupying about 1,800 square meters (19,000 sq ft) of an irregularly shaped corner lot adjacent to El Hogar, it has a frontage of 43 meters (141 ft) on General Luna Street and 46 meters (151 ft) on Muelle de la Industria, along the Pasig River. The building derived its design from the trademark architectural features set by the International Banking Corporation of New York for its overseas branches. The bank's prototype was made up of a row of colossal columns in antis, which was faithfully reproduced for its Manila headquarters. The ground floor was fully rusticated to effect a textured finish. This floor had arched openings with fanlights emphasized by stones forming the arch. The main doors were adorned with lintels resting on consoles. Above the ground floor were six three-storey high, engaged Ionic columns, ending in an entablature topped by a cornice. These six columns dominating the south and west facades were, in turn, flanked by a pair of pilasters on both fronts. The fifth floor was slightly indented and also topped by an entablature crowned by strip of anthemion.
