= Makati Central Business District =

Central business district in Metro Manila, Philippines

- Central Business District
- A drone shot of the Makati CBD (2026)

- Nickname(s): The Financial and Business Capital of the Philippines
- Coordinates: 14°33′2″N 121°01′24.8″E
- Country: Philippines
- Region: National Capital Region
- City: Makati
- Time zone: UTC+8 (PST)
- Area code: 2
- Website: Make It Makati

The Makati Central Business District (Makati CBD) (Note: Filipino: Sentrong Distrito ng Negosyo sa Makati) is a privately owned financial and central business district in the Philippines located in the heart of Makati in Metro Manila. It is politically and administratively known as "Central Cluster" in the West District of Makati. It is different from the Makati civic center known as "Makati Poblacion" which is situated at the northeast portion of the district. It is bounded by EDSA, Amorsolo Street, Ayala Avenue, Gil Puyat Avenue, Osmeña Highway, South Luzon Expressway, Metro Manila Skyway, Zobel Roxas Street, Ocampo Street, Metropolitan Avenue, Nicanor Garcia Street, Kalayaan Avenue, Makati Avenue, Anza Street, Polaris Street, Orion Street, Mercedes Street, Amapola Street and Estrella Street. The whole district occupies the barangays of San Antonio, San Lorenzo, Bel-Air, and Urdaneta.

Many of the skyscrapers in Metro Manila are in this area. The business district is also considered one of the most vibrant commercial districts in Southeast Asia. It contains the Ayala Center, which is one of the region's biggest shopping centers.

The financial district is managed by two groups—the Makati Commercial Estates Association (MaCEA) and the Ayala Property Management Corporation (APMC).

== History ==
=== Pre-war period ===
Downtown Makati started out as part of the wide municipality of Santa Ana de Sapa (part of the City of Manila today as the District of Sta. Ana) and became a town of its own in 1670, then as San Pedro de Macati in honor of its patron, Saint Peter.

In 1851, Don José Bonifacio Roxas (a member of the Ayala-Roxas family) purchased the farm estate of "Hacienda San Pedro de Macati" from the Jesuits for 52,800 pesos. The western portion of the estate is now what is called the downtown. Since then, Makati and its development remain close to the Zobel de Ayala family.

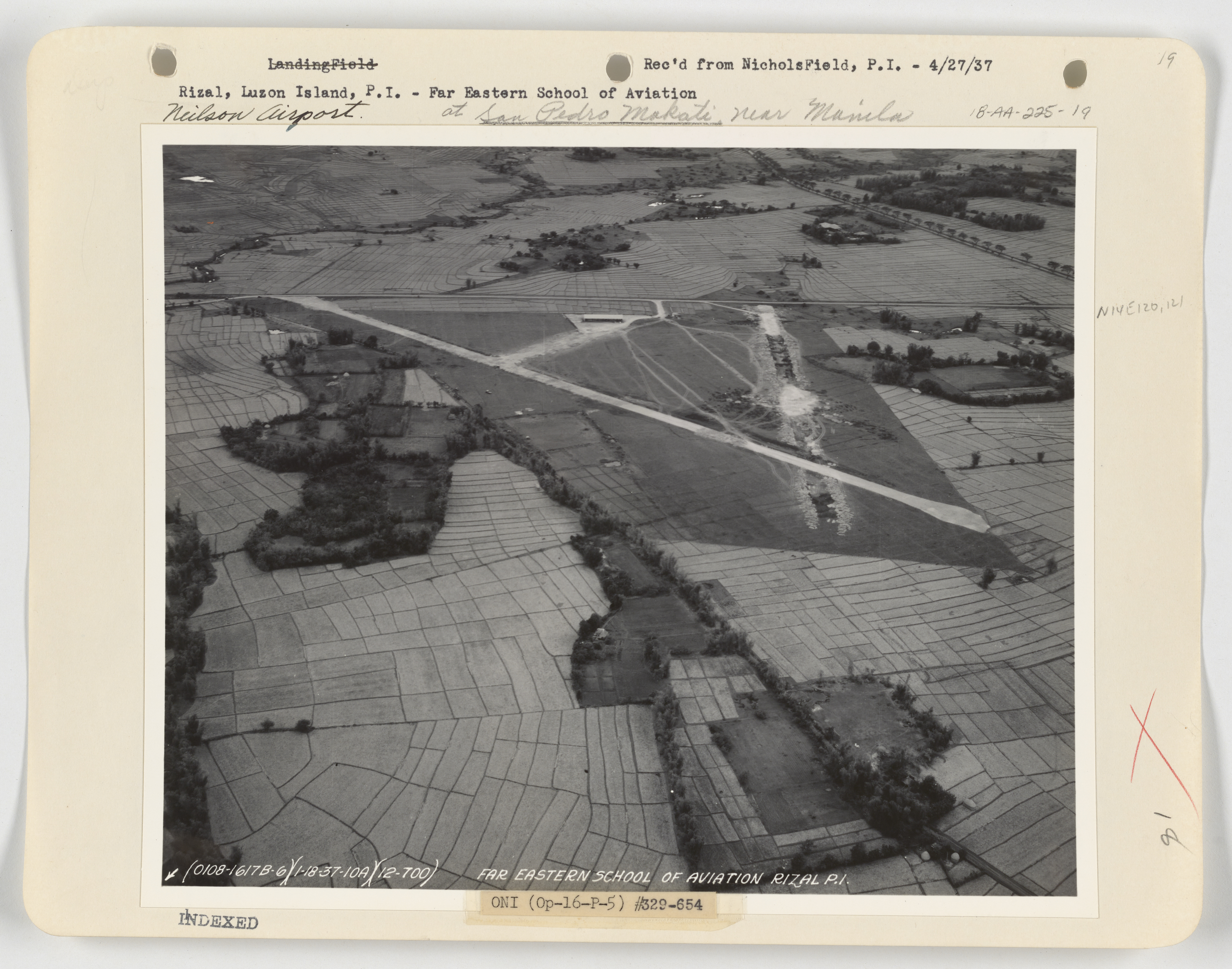
Aerial view of Nielson Field in 1937

In 1901, the Americans declared the whole area south of the Pasig River, including the whole Hacienda San Pedro de Macati (downtown), down to Alabang in the present-day Muntinlupa, a US military reservation; thus establishing Fort McKinley, which is now known as Fort Bonifacio. That same year, the whole town, with a population of 25,000, was incorporated from the then Province of Manila to the new province of Rizal with Marcelino Magsaysay serving as the town president.

In the 1930s, the first airport in Luzon island, Nielson Field, opened in what is now the Ayala Triangle within the hacienda. The airport was officially inaugurated in 1938, and Philippine Airlines began its operations there in 1941.

The tracks of what is now the Philippine National Railways reached the town very early in the decade, which is located at the western portion of the downtown at present, with three stations serving commuters and residents.

=== Postwar period ===
After the destruction of World War II that brought upon Makati, the town grew rapidly, and real estate values boomed. As Nielson Field closed down in 1948, the plan was set for the building of the central business district. The first centrally planned communities from the Ayalas' farm estate were established in the 1950s. Some of the gated communities (Urdaneta, San Lorenzo, San Antonio, and Bel-Air Villages) that were developed grew into commercial areas and office parks.

The multiple-lane Ayala Avenue was completed in 1958, which was once part of the runway of the first commercial airport in the country, Nielson Airport. The downtown was developed into high density residential and commercial areas according to specific zoning regulations.

In the early 1960s, Ayala y Cía commissioned some of the first high-rise buildings along Ayala Avenue from one of the country's best known architects, Leandro V. Locsin.

The Makati Stock Exchange (MkSE) was established on May 27, 1963, with its trading area located along Ayala Avenue in downtown. Although both the MSE (Manila Stock Exchange) and the MkSE traded the same stocks of the same companies, the bourses were separate stock exchanges for nearly 30 years until December 23, 1992, when both exchanges were unified to become the present-day Philippine Stock Exchange.

Downtown Makati has been the financial capital of the Philippines since the late 1960s, owing to congestion, relative lack of expansion area, higher land prices and taxes, and urban decay in Manila. Makati Commercial Center was built in the 1960s. The downtown district rapidly developed during the terms of town mayors Maximo Estrella and Jose Luciano, who encouraged the massive development of the town and welcomed foreign and local investors to what was tagged the nation's number one municipality at that time.

=== Martial Law era ===
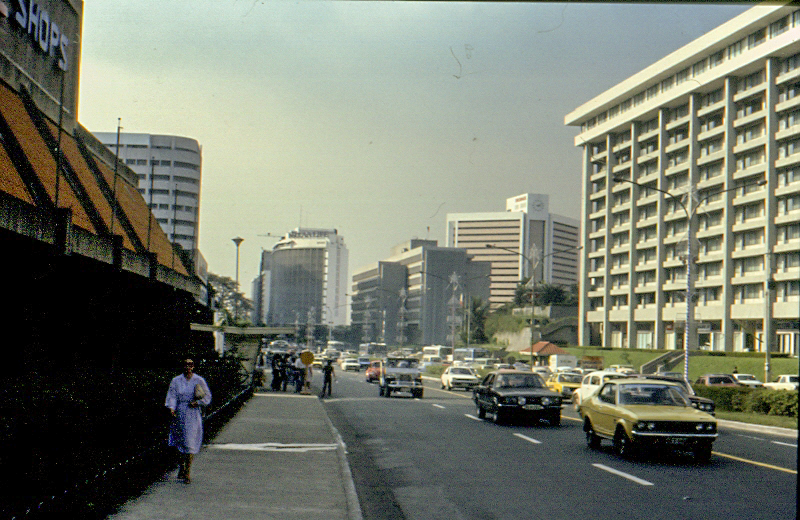
Ayala Avenue in 1982

In September 1972, President Ferdinand Marcos imposed Martial law in the Philippines. The formal announcement of the proclamation was made in the evening of September 23. Economic activity in the downtown was still ongoing, with Nemesio Yabut as town mayor, preparing the district for Makati's full integration as part of the new region of Metro Manila (officially the National Capital Region) and as a founding member of the Metropolitan Manila Commission, which it achieved with the commission's formal establishment on November 7, 1975, ending Makati's many years as a town under Rizal Province.

Following the assassination of Ninoy Aquino in 1983, the downtown area was one of the many places of rallies and mass demonstrations that were the basis of the People Power Revolution against the dictatorship of then-President Marcos in 1986. It was that decade that witnessed the emergence of a so-called moderate opposition, with the Makati Business Club, against Marcos' ailing authoritarian regime. Established in 1980, the MBC, a union of executives from business entities operating in the district, was then a voice of opposition to the dictatorship, and it was one of the leading organizers of what was then dubbed the Confetti Revolution, so-named due to the yellow confetti from torn phone directories thrown along Ayala Avenue from the buildings in the wide road, whenever the rallies would happen.

=== Late 1980s ===
After the death of Mayor Nemesio Yabut during the People Power Revolution, Corazon Aquino, Ninoy's widow and the country's first female president, appointed Jejomar Binay as the acting mayor of the town of Makati and was elected mayor in 1988. Having spent his childhood in the municipality and himself a veteran of the Confetti Revolution and of the opposition activities during the Marcos administration, his first term bore witness to the events of the coup d'état attempt in December 1989, which hit the district directly.

=== 1990s ===
The country's first skyscrapers started to rise in the business district, including the Pacific Star Building, The Peak Tower, Pacific Plaza, and the Rufino Pacific Tower.

Republic Act 7854, passed by Congress in late December 1994 and signed into law by President Fidel V. Ramos on January 2, 1995, officially established the City of Makati. On February 4, 1995, the character of the new city was ratified in a plebiscite with 91% of voters in favor of cityhood. The whole people of Makati especially the businessmen in downtown celebrated the remarkable event.

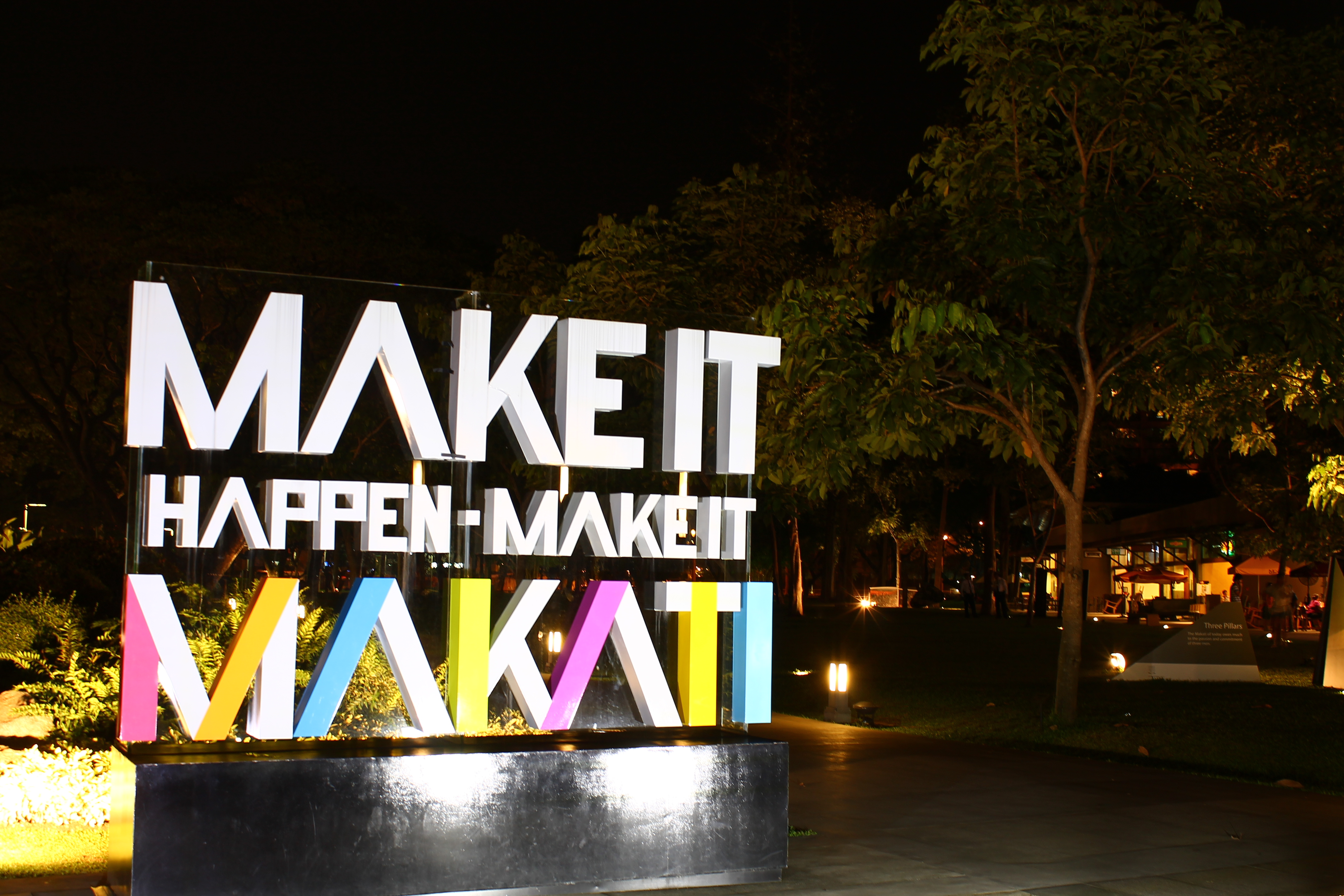
Ayala Triangle with the city's new slogan - "Make it Happen, Make it Makati"

=== 21st century ===
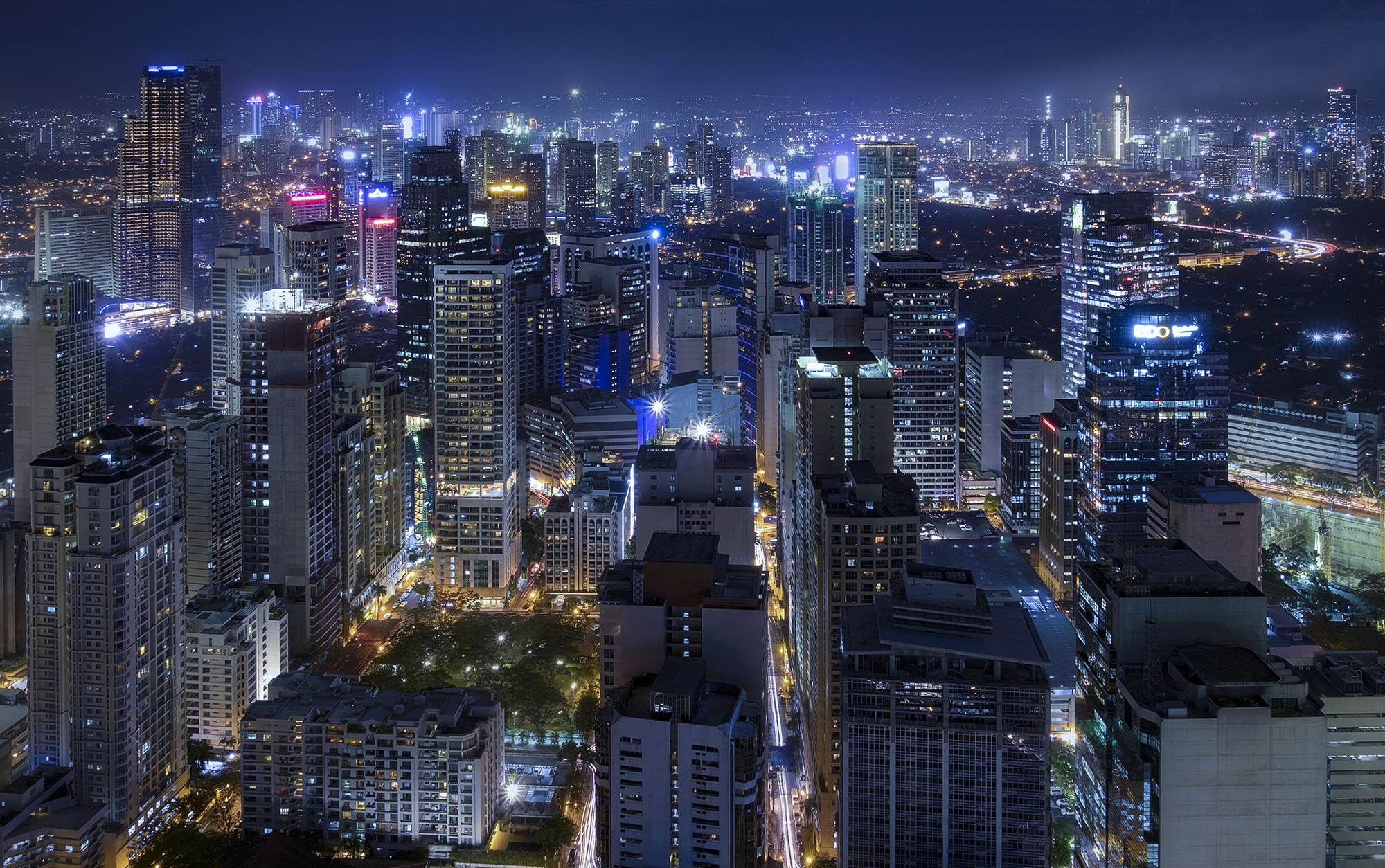
Makati CBD at night (2017)

In the early 2000s, the downtown was a primary target of political rallies and terrorist attacks.

On May 17, 2000, at 5:02 p.m., Glorietta inside Ayala Center was bombed injuring 12 persons, mostly teenagers. According to local authorities, the homemade bomb was placed in front of a toilet beside a video arcade. It was said to be the precursor to the May 21, 2000 SM Megamall bombing and the December 30, 2000 Rizal Day bombings.

From August 2000 to January 2001, a wave of protests against the former president Joseph Estrada occurred in the district. The anti-Estrada protests in Makati focused on Ayala Avenue, which cuts from EDSA to Buendia (now Gil Puyat Avenue).

In 2003, The Oakwood mutiny took place in the Oakwood Premier (now Ascott Makati), within the Glorietta complex, and on 2007, the Manila Peninsula siege took place at The Peninsula Manila. Both happened at the Makati CBD to call for former president Gloria Macapagal Arroyo to step down.

The 2007 Glorietta explosion ripped through Glorietta 2 on October 19, 2007. The death toll in the explosion was 11, with 120 injured. Despite conflicting reports, it was concluded that the explosion was caused by a faulty liquefied petroleum gas tank located in a Chinese restaurant.

In 2011, the Occupy Wall Street movement protesting economic inequality and the power of United States financial institutions spread from New York City to other parts of the world, including the Philippines. The movement's supporters' first action was held on October 14, when protesters marched in Makati City from the Ninoy Aquino monument on Ayala Avenue to the American Chamber of Commerce. The movement here in the country is called "Occupy Philippines", which had other protests held at the US Embassy and Rizal Park in Manila after the protest in Makati.

In 2014, the Makati Tourism Foundation and Makati city government started a tourism campaign called "Make it Happen, Make it Makati", which promotes tourism mainly in the business district.

== Divisions ==
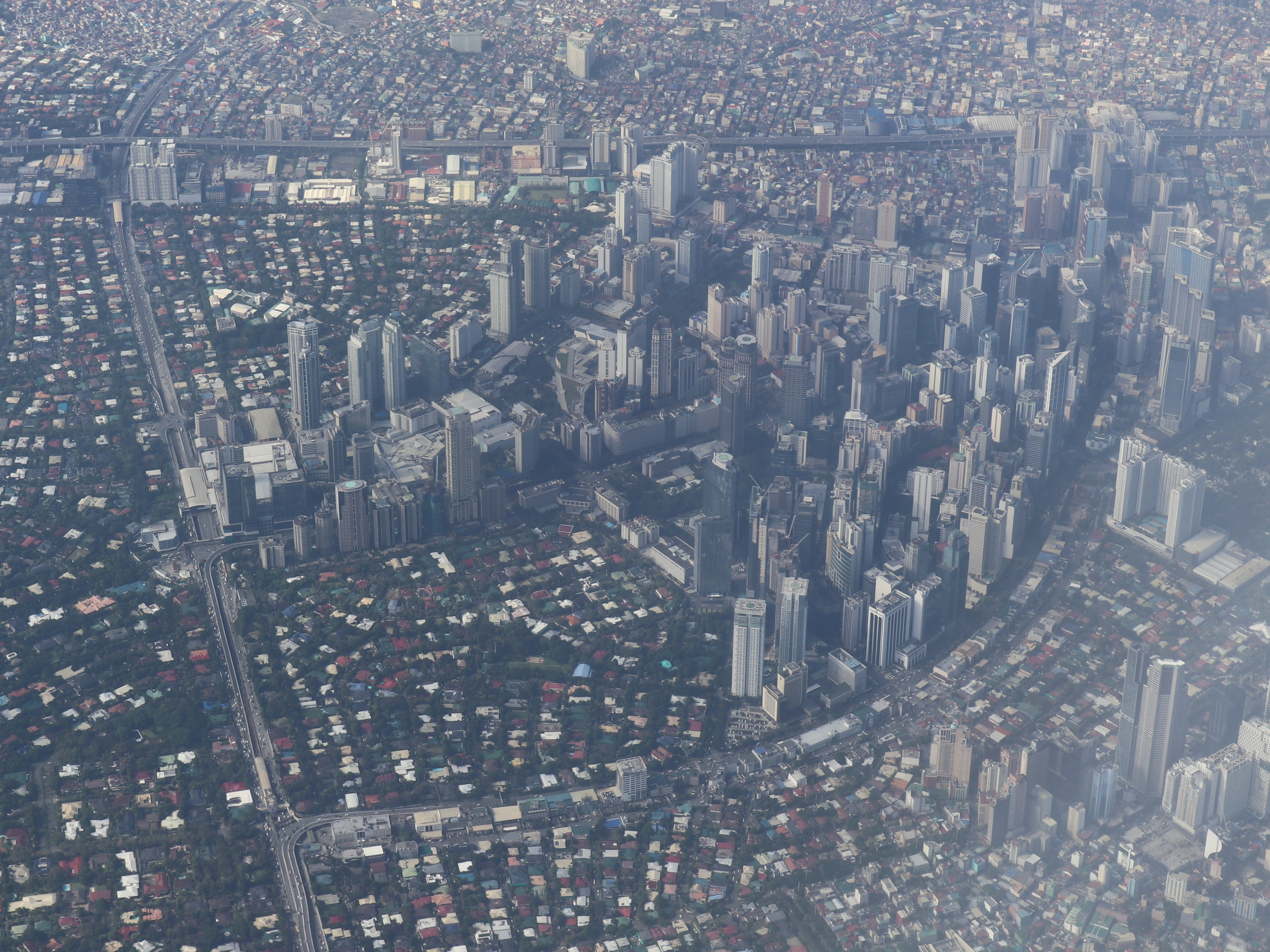
Bird's eye view of the Makati Central Business District.

The Makati Central Business District is situated within four barangays of Makati.

=== Barangay Bel-Air ===
Barangay Bel-Air is an affluent enclave and the richest barangay in the Philippines located in the heart of Makati Central Business District, established in the early 1950s. It has a total land area of 1.7121 square kilometers (0.6610 sq mi), the third largest among the posh villages in Makati City. The barangay includes Ayala North, Buendia Area, Ayala Triangle, Salcedo Village and Bel-Air Village. The predominant land use of this tobacco pipe-shaped barangay is residential and commercial. It boasts commercial buildings and establishments.

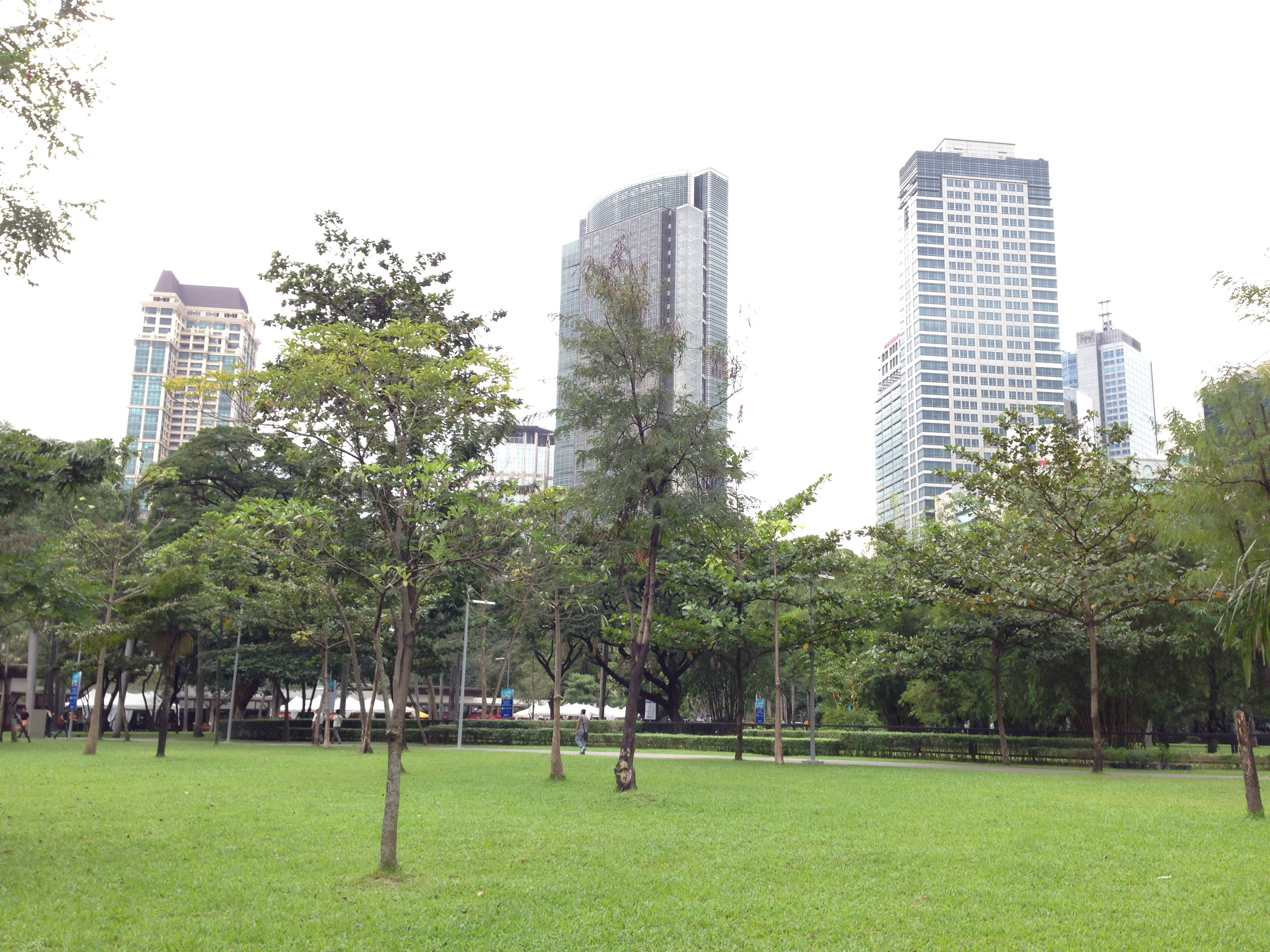
The view of Ayala Triangle Gardens

Bel-Air Village is the third subdivision developed by Ayala. The development, which started in 1957, was undertaken in four phases. The village boundaries are clockwise, Estrella Street, EDSA, Jupiter Street, Nicanor Garcia (Reposo) Street, Kalayaan Avenue, Neptune Street, Makati Avenue, Anza Street, Polaris Street, Mercedes Street, Amapola Street, back to Estrella. The total land area of Bel-Air Village is 78.7242 hectares (194.532 acres), of which 64.6748 hectares (159.815 acres) is subdivided into 950 residential lots.

Ayala Triangle is a sub-district of Downtown Makati, comprising the land between Ayala Avenue, Makati Avenue and Paseo de Roxas. The Ayala Triangle Gardens is Makati's Central Park, which was the only urban oasis in Makati at the heart of the central business district, will be developed into mixed commercial and residential space. This triangular block also houses the Makati Stock Exchange, the Ayala Tower One and the Filipinas Heritage Library, built on the site of the historic Nielson Tower.

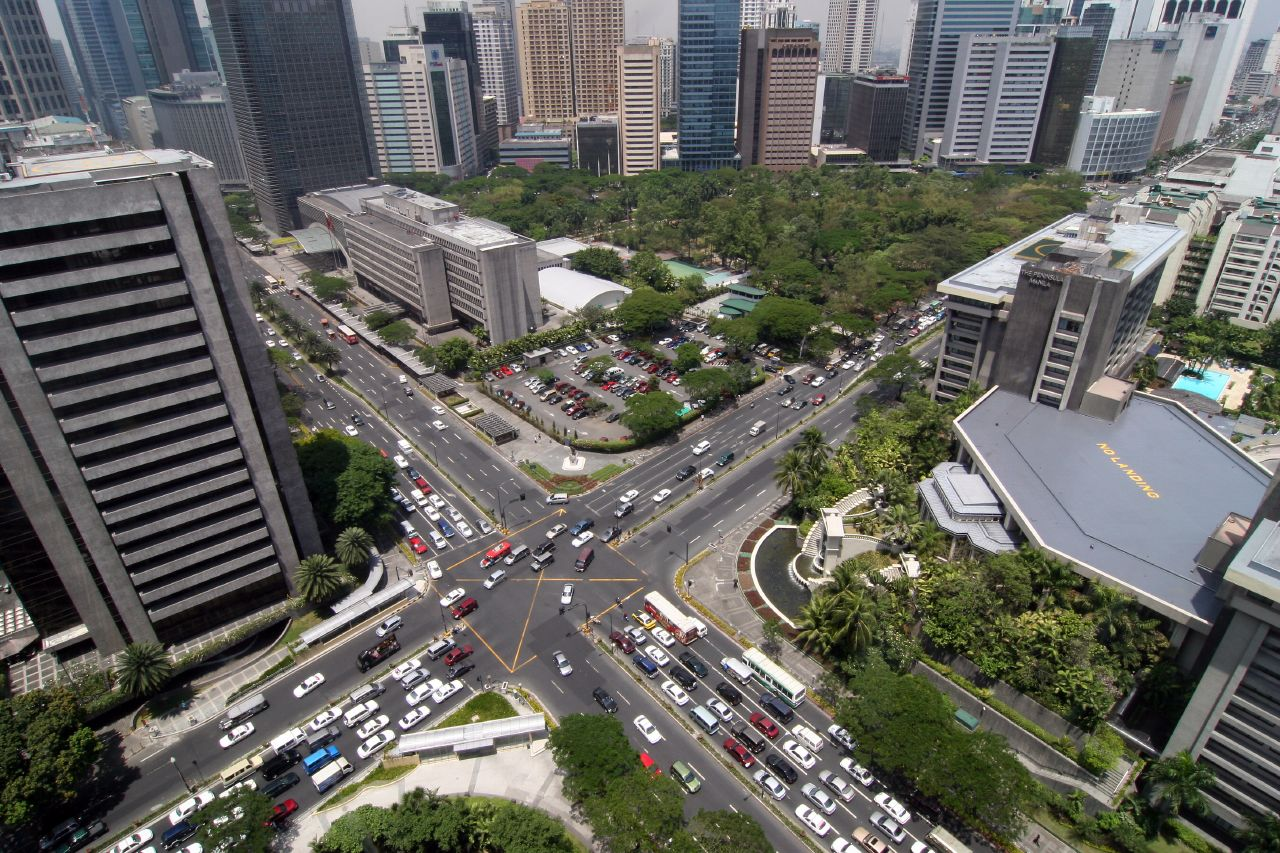
Salcedo Village and Ayala Triangle

Salcedo Village is a business park developed by Ayala Corporation located in Makati Central Business District. It is named after the de Salcedo brothers - Juan and Felipe - who are both Spanish conquistadors who were part of the Legazpi's expedition. It is bounded by Gil Puyat Avenue, Makati Avenue, Paseo de Roxas, and Ayala Avenue. It is home to the country's notable office skyscrapers like the PBCom Tower and GT International Tower, as well as the Salcedo Community Market at Salcedo Park.

Ayala North is an informal district bounded by the streets of Gil Puyat Avenue, Ayala Avenue Extension, Kamagong Street, Ecoville Street, Metropolitan Avenue and Nicanor Garcia Street. It is the home of Alphaland Makati Place, The Lerato, The Columns Ayala Avenue, Makati Life Medical Center, Altaire, BIR Regional Office Building, The Zone Sports Center and FEU Makati Campus.

Buendia Area got its name from the former name of Gil Puyat Avenue. It is bounded by Gil Puyat Avenue, Nicanor Garcia Street, Jupiter Street and EDSA. The headquarters of Department of Trade and Industry and Department of Tourism are located at the area. SM Cyberzone Buildings and other mid-rise commercial buildings is found along Gil Puyat Avenue. Buendia MRT station serves the area. It is one of the two underground stations that can be found on the transit, the other being is the Ayala MRT station, which is also serves the business district.

=== Barangay San Antonio ===
A drone shot of Barangays San Antonio and Pio Del Pilar

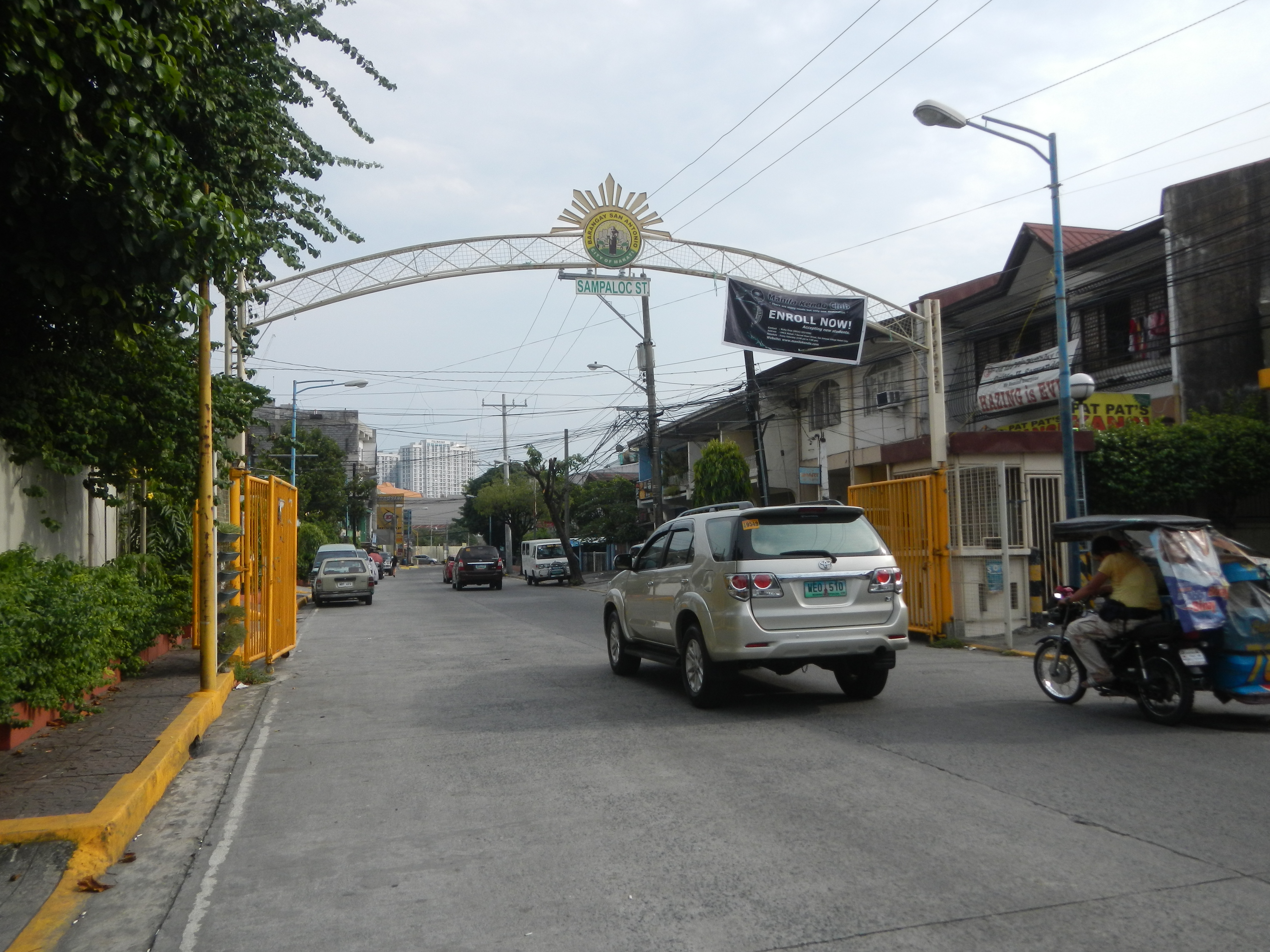
An entrance to San Antonio Village

Barangay San Antonio has a land area of 0.8958 square kilometers (0.3459 sq mi) which occupies 3.3% of the city's total land area. Based on the 2010 census of population released by the National Statistics Office, San Antonio has a percentage share of 2.2% or 11,443 versus the city's population with a density of 13 persons per 1,000 square kilometers (390 sq mi). San Antonio is bounded by Barangay La Paz in the north, Barangays Pio Del Pilar and San Lorenzo in the south, Barangays Sta. Cruz and Bel-Air in the east, and Barangay Palanan in the west. Formerly called Barrio Camachile, it is named after Saint Anthony of Padua, the barrio's patron saint.

San Antonio Village is a medium density residential village in the northern portion of the barangay. It is bounded by Ayala Avenue Extension, Yakal Street, Chino Roces Avenue, Gil Puyat Avenue, Osmeña Highway, Zobel Roxas Street, P. Ocampo Street, Metropolitan Avenue, Ecoville Street and Kamagong Street. Other recognized structures located there include the San Antonio National High School, San Antonio Elementary School, National Shrine of the Sacred Heart, Makati Central Police Headquarters, and St. Paul the Apostle Sanctuary. Moreover, the most notable personality residing in the village is former Vice President Jejomar Binay and his family.

San Antonio South is an informal highly density residential and commercial area in the southern portion of the barangay. It is bounded by Chino Roces Avenue, Yakal Street, Ayala Avenue Extension and Gil Puyat Avenue. It consists of high-rise residential and commercial buildings, as well as the Makati Central Fire Station, and Makati Central Post Office.

=== Barangay San Lorenzo ===
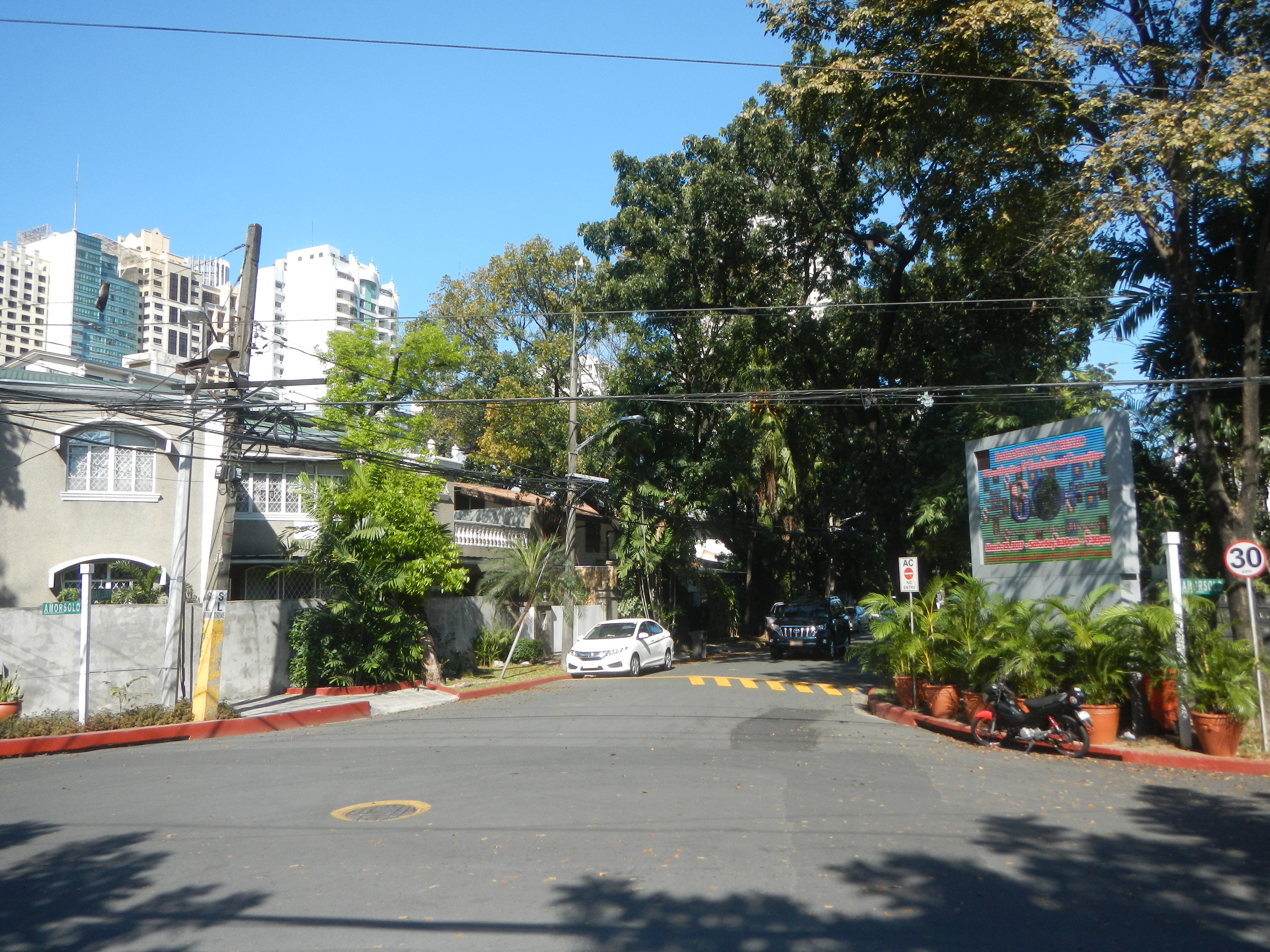
San Lorenzo Village

Barangay San Lorenzo, included under Cluster 1 or Central Cluster, is considered one of the richest barangays in the Philippines for it embraces part of the Central Business District, where its revenue mainly comes from. It has a total land area of 1.7341 square kilometers (0.6695 sq mi). The population density of Barangay San Lorenzo is computed to be 6 persons per 1,000 square meters. Established in the 1950s, it is also one of the oldest.

Facade of Ayala Center Station (Glorietta-facing) before demolition of InterContinental Manila

Ayala Center is a major commercial development operated by Ayala Land located in the central business district of Makati. It is a premier shopping and cultural district in Metro Manila. The area is bounded by Ayala Avenue, De la Rosa Street, and Legazpi Street on the north, Epifanio de los Santos Avenue (EDSA) on the east, Arnaiz Avenue on the south, and to west by Paseo de Roxas. The Ayala MRT station of the MRT Line 3 serves the area. The development originally started with a number of separate shopping arcades and Greenbelt Park before expanding to cover over 50 hectares (120 acres). Glorietta and Greenbelt shopping malls are located within the complex, as well as the One Ayala complex. This lifestyle hub is the Philippines's shopping mecca, and is serviced by upscale hotels.

Greenbelt Mall, Ayala Center Complex

Legazpi Village is a business park built by the Ayala Corporation within the Makati downtown area. It is named after Miguel López de Legazpi, a Spanish conquistador who became the Spanish East Indies's (present-day Philippines) first Governor-General under the Spanish rule. The area is home to the Asian Institute of Management, as well as the Washington SyCip Park and Legazpi Active Park.

San Lorenzo Village is a residential village located at the south of Legazpi Village and Ayala Center. It is the home of Assumption College San Lorenzo.

=== Barangay Urdaneta ===
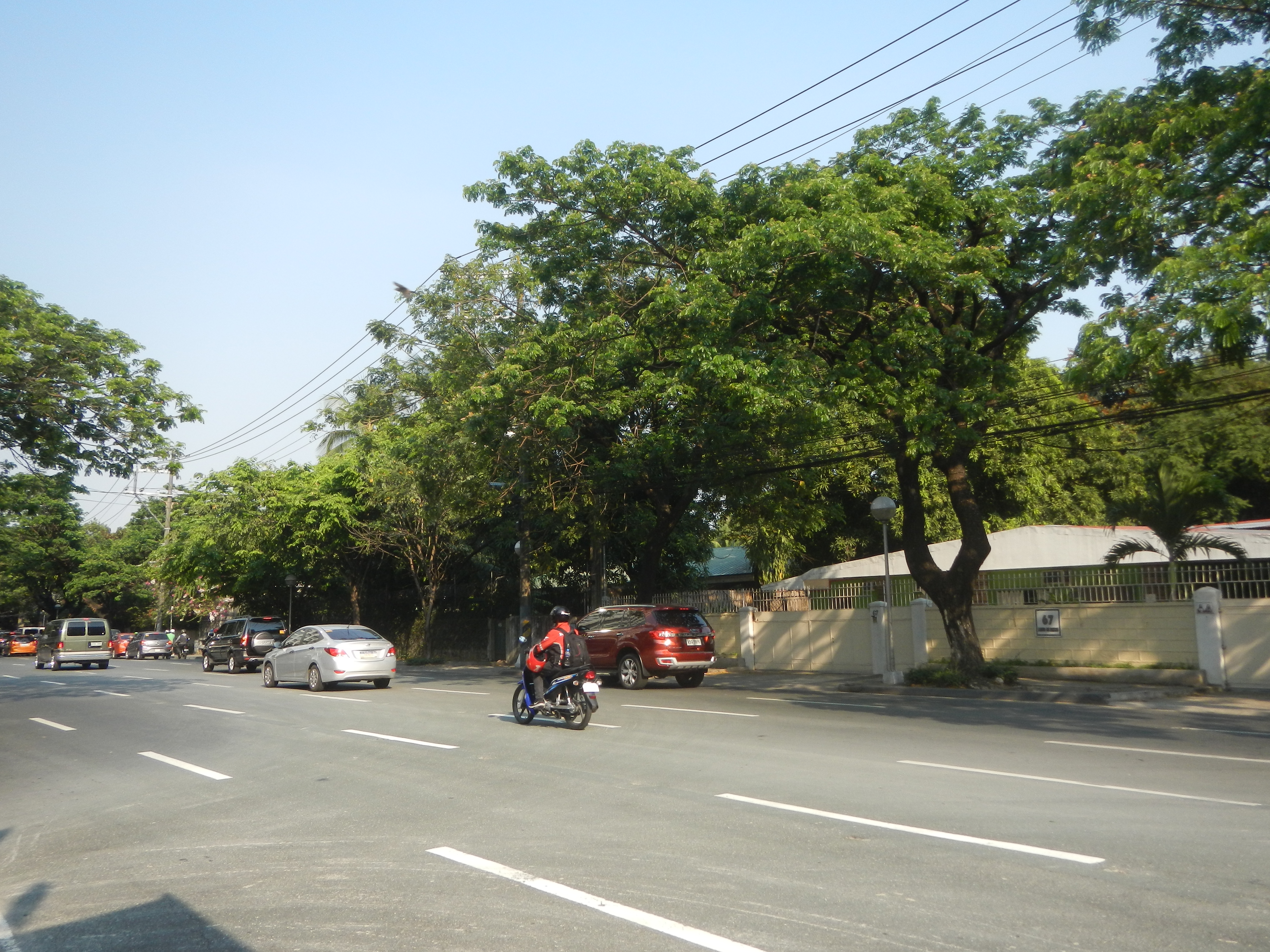
Houses along Paseo de Roxas in Barangay Urdaneta

The smallest barangay to complete Central Cluster is Barangay Urdaneta with a total land area of 0.7399 square kilometers (0.2857 sq mi). It is one of the first centrally planned communities together with Forbes Park, San Lorenzo and Bel-Air which was established in the 1950s by the Ayala Family. Originally, Urdaneta and Bel-Air formed part of a single village called “Beldaneta”. The barangay is bounded by the roads of EDSA, Ayala Avenue, Makati Avenue, and Buendia Avenue. Its bounding barangays are Bel-Air (north and west), San Lorenzo (south), and Forbes Park (east).

Roxas Triangle is a district and intersection of the major streets of Paseo de Roxas, Makati Avenue and Gil Puyat Avenue. The offices of Development Bank of the Philippines and Metropolitan Bank and Trust Company are located here. Mandarin Oriental Manila and Roxas Triangle Towers are also located in the area.

Apartment Ridge is a complex of apartment and condominium buildings along the streets of Makati Avenue and Ayala Avenue outside Urdaneta Village. The Peninsula Manila, Discovery Primea and The Makati Tuscany are located in this area.

Urdaneta Village is a quiet and peaceful residential gated community within its barangay. The name of the barangay came from the subdivision's name.

== Economy ==
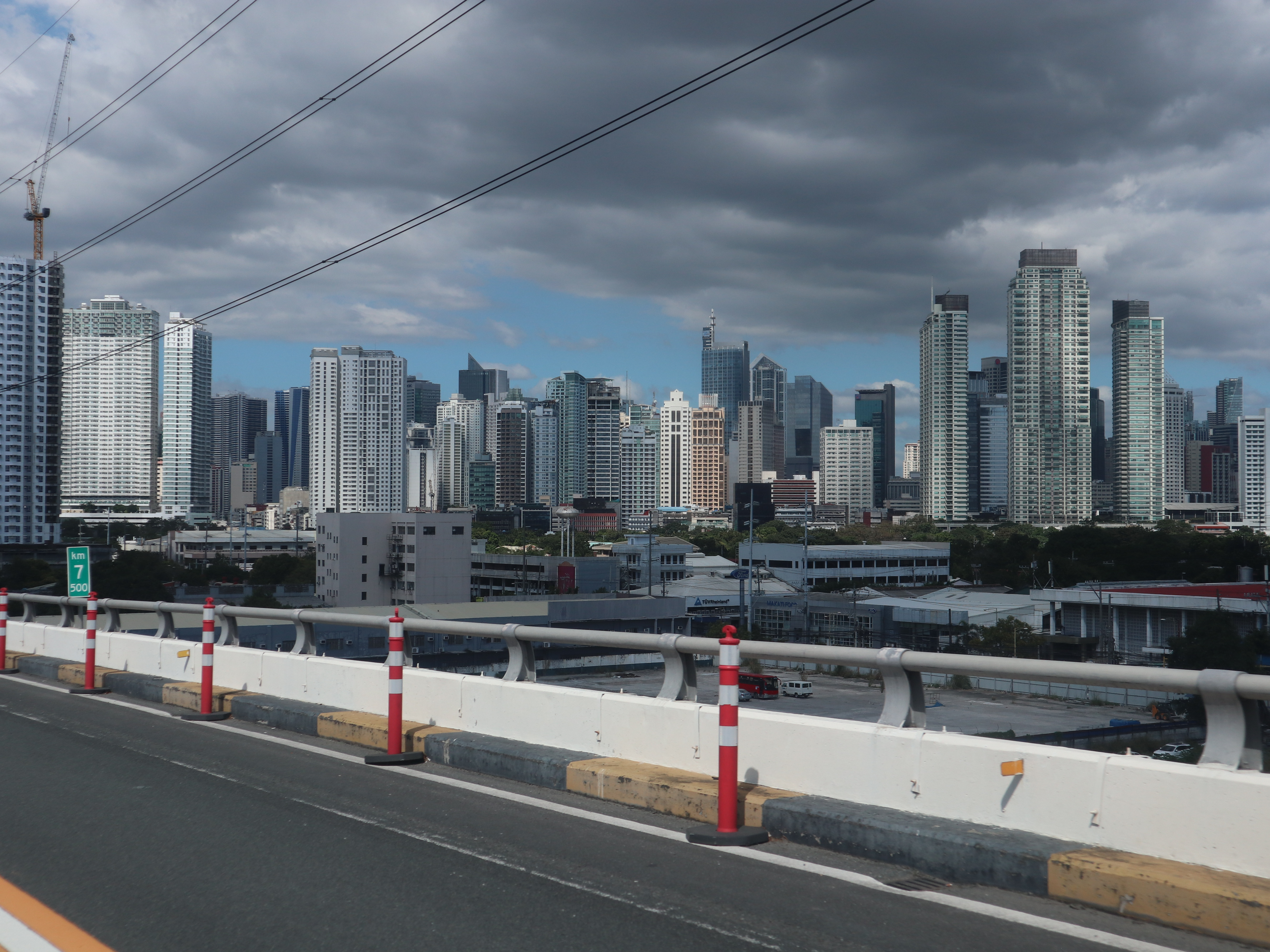
The Makati CBD skyline, viewed from Metro Manila Skyway

=== Corporate headquarters ===
Most of the famous law firms, construction firms, stock brokerages and other big companies in the Philippines have their main offices here. Palafox Associates, Sycip, Gorres, Velayo & Co. and Gozar Planners are examples of business firms headquartered in the district. Top Frontier Investment Holdings, Ayala Corporation, and Metropolitan Bank and Trust Company, which are companies listed in Forbes Global 2000, headquartered in the downtown area. Many companies listed in the PSE Composite Index are or at least once headquartered in the district like Ayala Land, Bank of the Philippine Islands, DMCI Holdings, GT Capital, Metro Pacific Investments (since moved to Pasig), PLDT, and Security Bank. Universal and commercial banking corporations have their main offices in the area like China Banking Corporation, Development Bank of the Philippines, Philippine Savings Bank, Rizal Commercial Banking Corporation, Security Bank, United Coconut Planters Bank, Chinatrust Philippines, HSBC Philippines, Maybank Philippines, Philippine Bank of Communications and Philippine Veterans Bank. The Landbank of the Philippines used to be headquartered in Makati before they had their constructed their own building on a lot in Malate, Manila as purchased from another government owned and controlled-corporation (GOCC) Nayong Pilipino.

Makati is the second home of broadsheet newspaper publications in the Philippines, behind Manila. The Inquirer Group, who owns Philippine Daily Inquirer, the second most widely read broadsheet newspaper in the Philippines, has its headquarters around San Antonio Village. Business newspaper publications like BusinessMirror (which also runs the tabloid newspaper publicatio Pinas The Filipino's Global Newspaper), has its headquarters along Chino Roces Avenue cor Dela Rosa Street. MediaQuest Holdings, one of the largest media conglomerates in the country, could have been headquartered here - since moved to Mandaluyong. The company owns a lot of the current media establishments such as two television and radio networks - TV5 Network, Inc. (TV5) and Nation Broadcasting Corporation (NBC), a Pay TV provider Cignal TV (Cignal), a two broadsheets BusinessWorld Publishing Corporation (BusinessWorld) and Philstar Daily, Inc. (The Philippine Star). Smart Communications, which is a wholly-owned mobile phone and wireless Internet service subsidiary of the PLDT, is headquartered in the district.

The Ayala Automotive Holdings Corporation, a subsidiary of Ayala Corporation is the largest automotive company in the country, which has its main offices in the district. As of 2001, the company owned the regional operations of Honda, Isuzu and Volkswagen in the Philippines.

Until March 2018, when it moved to Bonifacio Global City in Taguig, the Philippine Stock Exchange Headquarters, along with the Makati Trading Floor, was located in the CBD, and was the successor to the long running Makati Stock Exchange, which operated from 1963 to 1992.

=== Regional headquarters ===
There are more than a hundred multinational companies, which are companies listed in Forbes Global 2000, have regional headquarters and operations in Makati, most within the CBD, like Intel, Microsoft, Nestlé, Syngenta, Shell, Convergys, PeopleSupport, SC Johnson & Son Inc, CBN Asia, Stages Production Specialist Inc, Alaska Milk Corporation, and Accenture. There are many call centers present in the area like Teletech, Convergys and PeopleSupport. Hewlett Packard Philippines and an HP Service Center are in Makati. Asiana Airlines operates a sales office on the sixth floor of the Salcedo Tower.

== Facilities ==
=== Healthcare ===
The Makati CBD is the location of the Makati Medical Center, a private hospital and the largest healthcare company in the country and a subsidiary of Metro Pacific Investments Corporation. The district also contains the Makati Life Medical Center.

=== Education ===
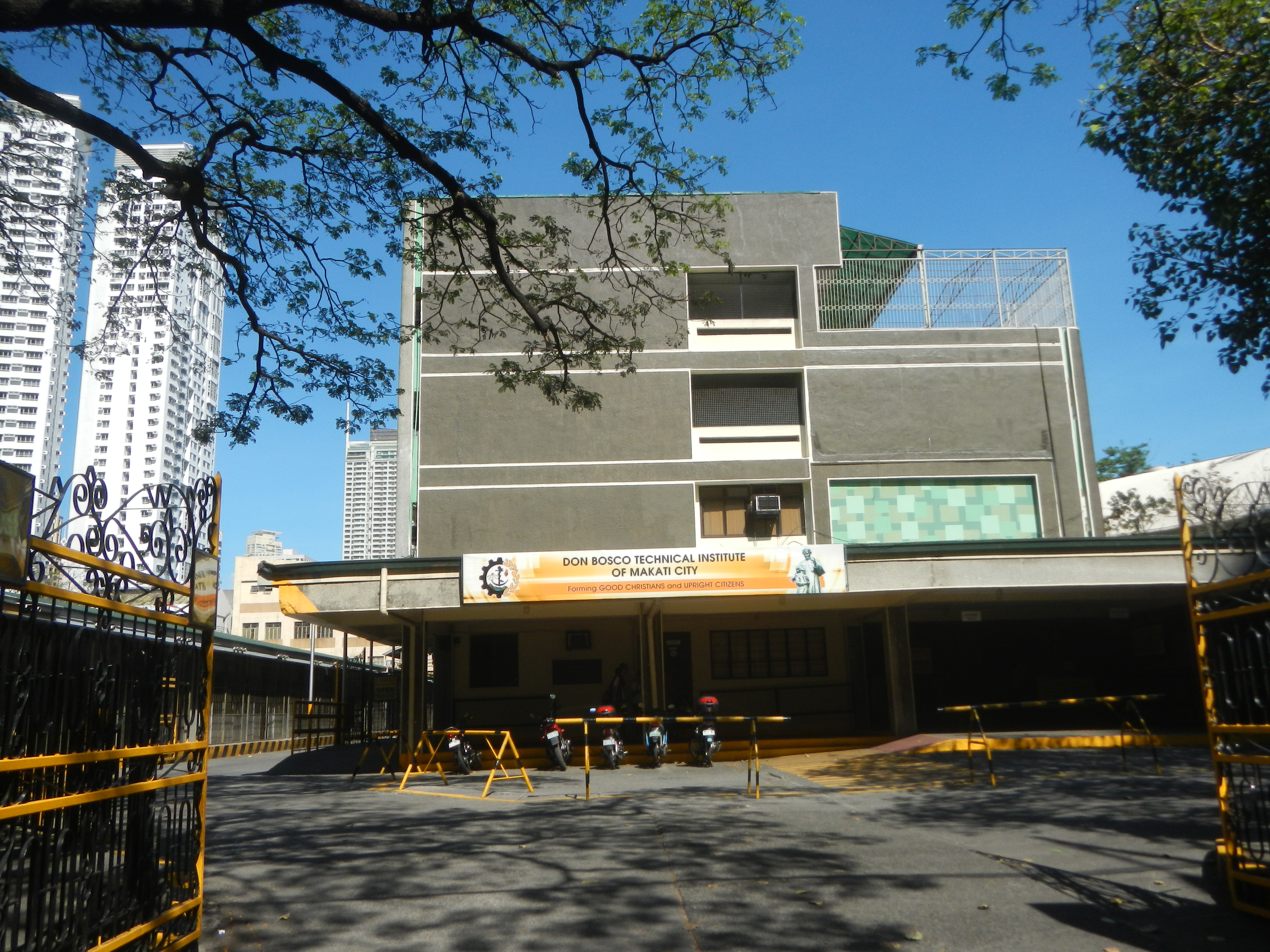
Don Bosco Technical Institute, Makati

There are several libraries in the metropolis are open to the public. The Filipinas Heritage Library is a famous iconic library formerly situated in Ayala Triangle along Makati Avenue. It has since been relocated to and now operating within the Ayala Museum.

The district is also home of Makati's prestigious schools and colleges. Some top universities of the Philippines is situated in downtown. The following are:

- Asia Pacific College
- Asian Institute of Management
- Assumption College San Lorenzo
- Centro Escolar University Makati
- De La Salle University – Makati Campus
- Far Eastern University - Makati
- Lyceum of the Philippines University – Makati

=== Shopping Centers ===
- One Ayala
- Greenbelt
- Makati Central Square (formerly Makati Cinema Square)
- Glorietta
- Landmark
- Rustan's Makati
- SM Makati

=== Parks & Museums ===
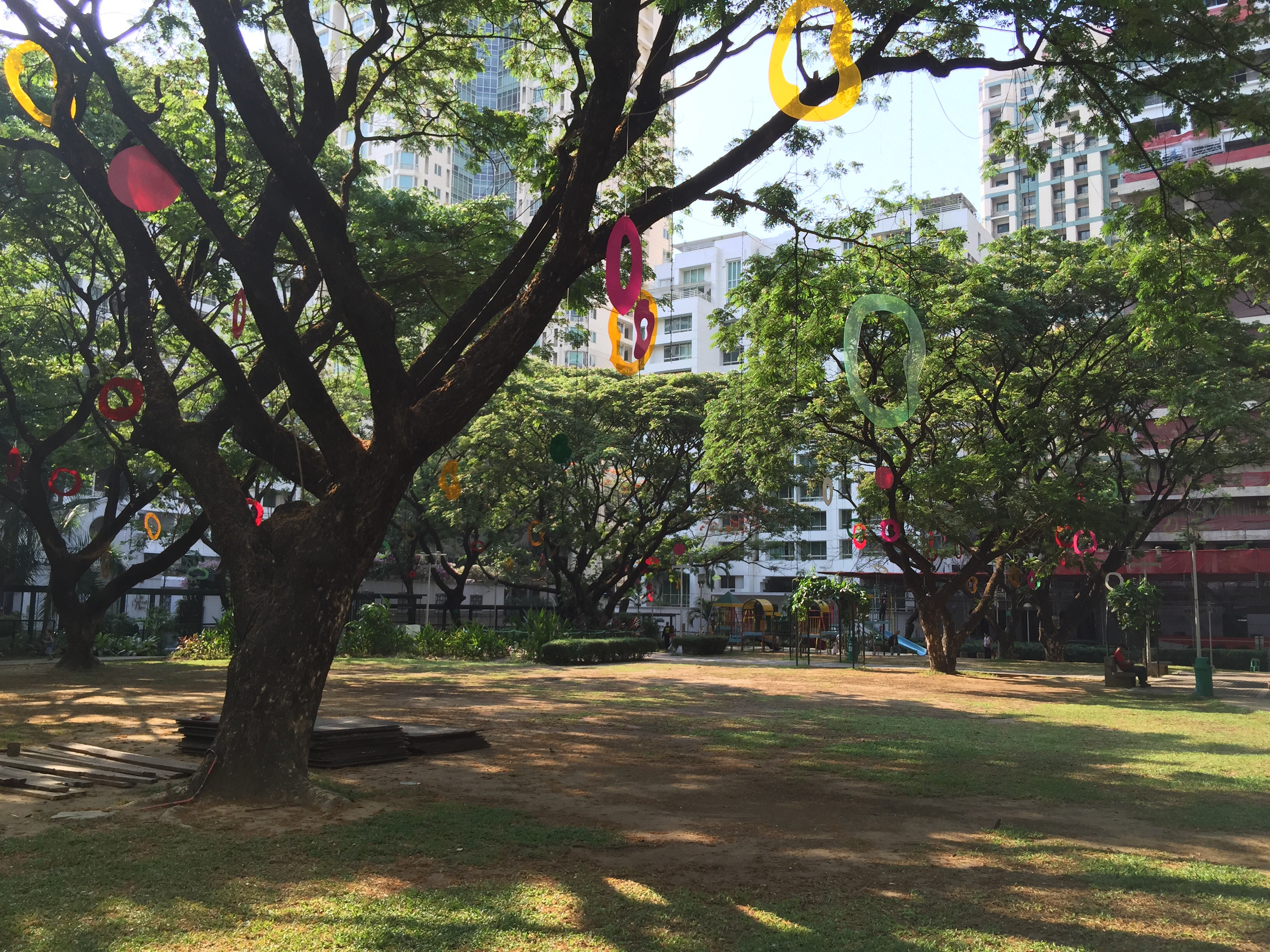
Jaime Velasquez Park

- Ayala Museum
- Ayala Triangle Gardens
- Bel-Air Park
- Dolphin Park
- Glorietta 3 Park
- Greenbelt Park
- Jaime C. Velasquez Park
- Legazpi Active Park
- Makati Sports Club
- San Lorenzo Clubhouse
- Urdaneta Park
- Washington Sycip Park
- Yuchengco Museum

== Transportation ==
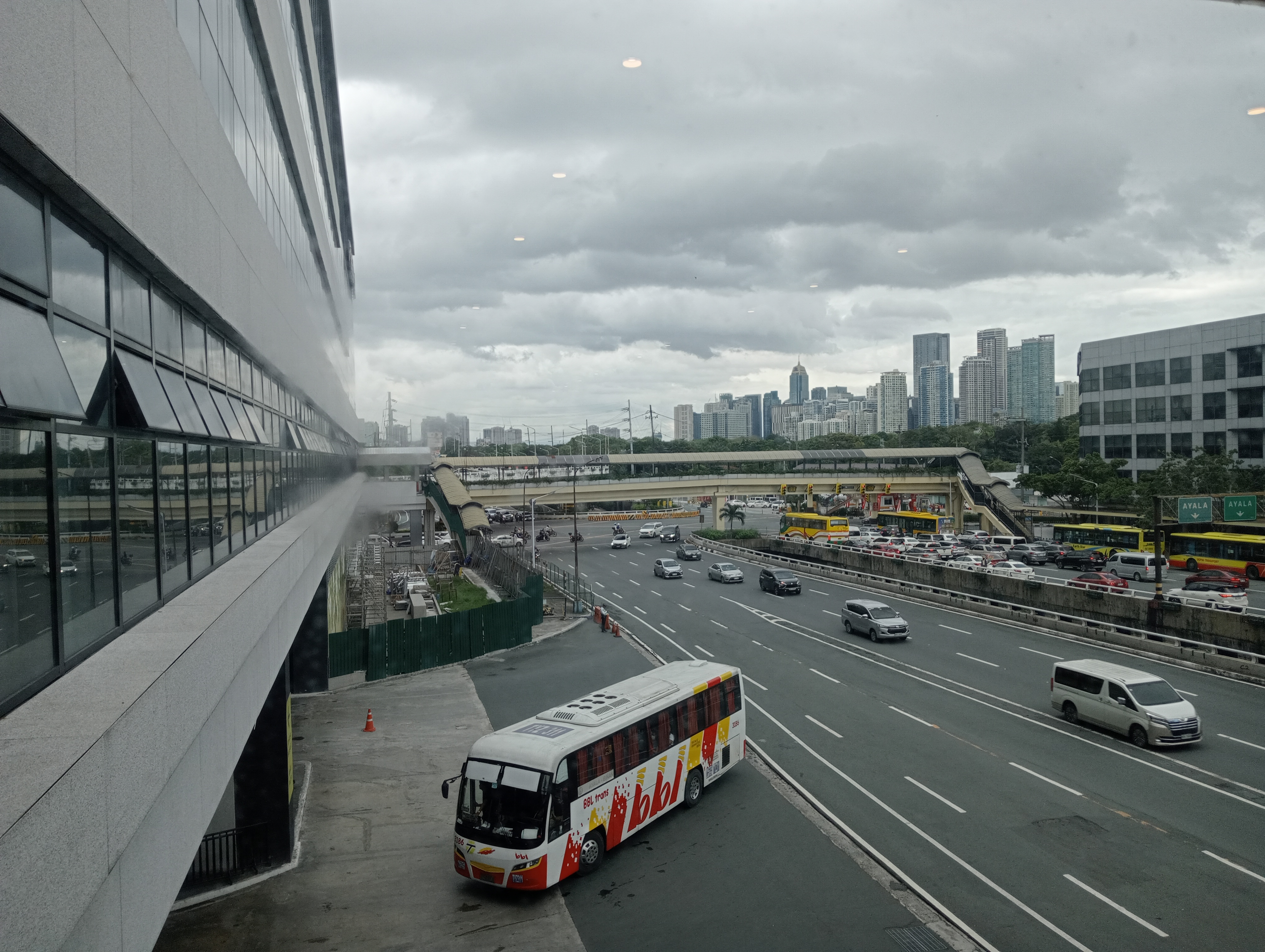
EDSA as seen from One Ayala

Downtown Makati is one of the most easily accessed business districts in the Philippines. Public transportation within the city is facilitated mostly using inexpensive jeepneys and buses for commuters working in the district. Most of the buses and jeepneys come from EDSA, the main thoroughfare in Metro Manila. Buses plying the avenue from south Metro Manila, Laguna and beyond pass through the central business district daily. Ayala Center is the main public transport terminal inside the district, where various jeepneys, UV Express, and buses stop. This can also accommodate the vehicles of passengers riding the MRT. There are also various point-to-point bus stops especially in Legazpi Village, Glorietta, and One Ayala. There are also available intercity bus in downtown that plies routes from Ayala Center to Bonifacio Global City via McKinley Road operated only by the Bonifacio Transport Corporation, called BGC Bus. In 2015, the city's new transport hub called the McKinley Exchange Corporate Center, which is also along EDSA outside downtown, was opened. People enter and leave the city through this new central transport hub, which serves buses, taxes and jeepneys and is a walking distance from the MRT Ayala station.

There are several parking buildings for private vehicle-owning people working or have business in the area. Public transport vehicles such as Transport network vehicle service (TNVS, .e.g Uber, Grab) as well as taxis are also widely available. Because it is the leading business district in the metropolis, it often experiences traffic congestion. The Metropolitan Manila Development Authority (MMDA) is a national government-supervised coordinating body of local government units responsible for traffic regulation in the metropolis. In 1995, they implemented road space rationing called Unified Vehicular Volume Reduction Program (UVVRP, colloquially "number coding") to reduce the traffic congestion. Except on holidays, Makati implemented the full number coding scheme on all (four-wheels and up, i.e. except motorcycles) road vehicles from 7:00 a.m. to 7:00 p.m. without window hours from Monday to Friday. Exempted from these are expressways such as the privately-operated Skyway Stage 3, national government-operated EDSA and Osmeña Highway. The latter two follow MMDA's regular number coding scheme on the same days from 7:00 am to 10:00 am and from 5:00 pm to 8:00 pm.

The downtown district is served by major roads and expressways. The following are:

Highways
- : Epifanio delos Santos Avenue
- : Osmeña Highway
- : Gil Puyat Avenue

Expressways

- : Skyway
- : South Luzon Expressway

It is also accessible through some train stations of the Manila Metro Rail Transit System (MRT). The following are:

- Buendia MRT station
- Ayala MRT station
- Magallanes MRT station

The Central Business District would supposedly be serviced by the planned Makati Intra-city Subway, which construction was stopped due to the finalization of the territorial dispute between Makati and Taguig, thereby putting into question the economic viability of the whole project. Two stations are supposedly to be built at the government owned-"Mile Long" property–Amorsolo Street in Legazpi Village and Buendia (Gil Puyat Avenue) in Barangay San Antonio.
