= Washington SyCip Park =

Park in the Philippines

Coordinates: 14°33′14″N 121°01′05″E

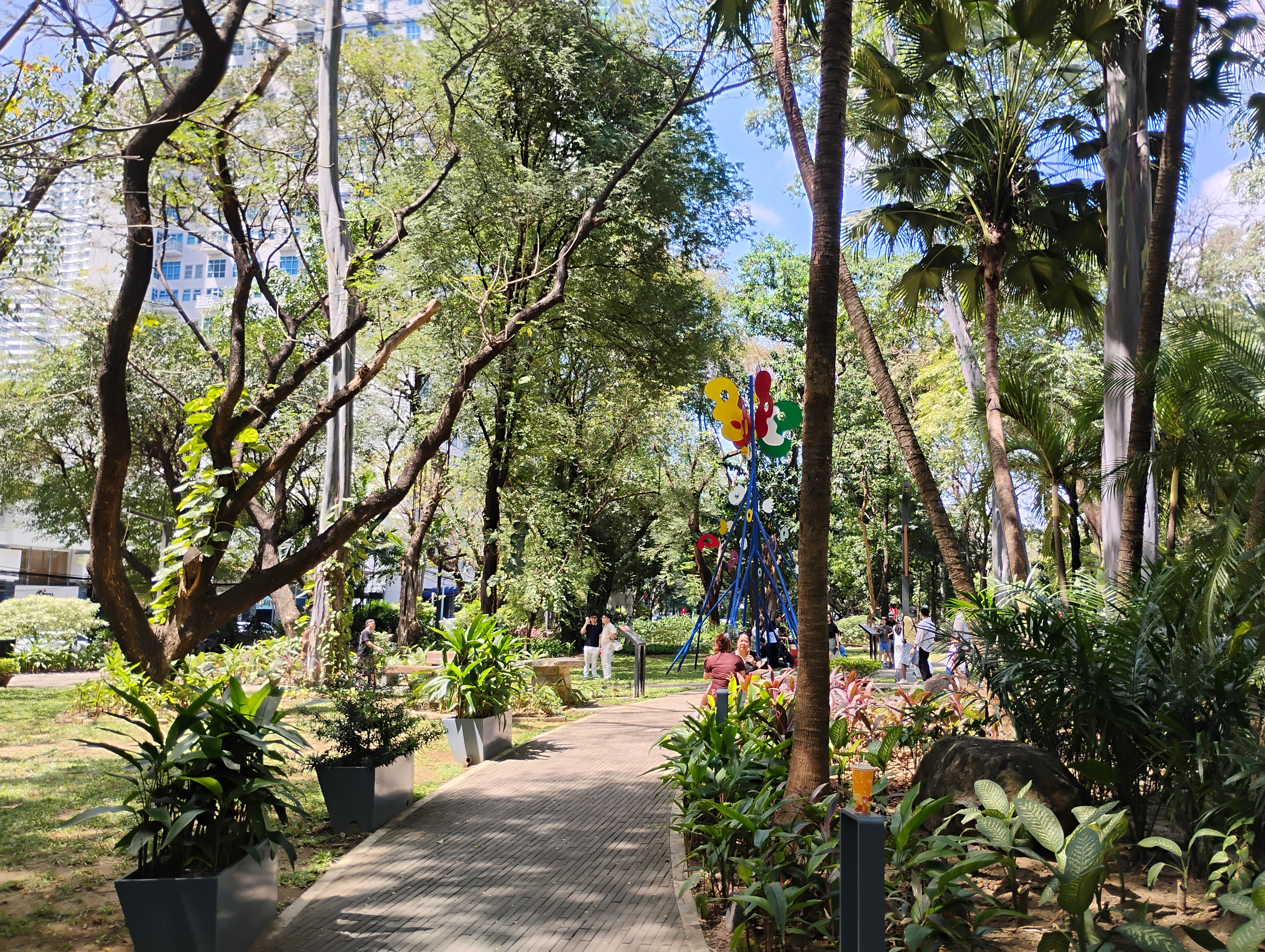
- The park in 2026
- Interactive map of Washington SyCip Park
- Type: Urban park
- Location: Legazpi Village, Makati, Metro Manila, Philippines
- Created: 2006
- Operator: Ayala Land; Makati Commercial Estate Association
- Status: Opened

Washington SyCip Park is a privately owned public park near Greenbelt mall in Legazpi Village in Barangay San Lorenzo, a hybrid commercial and residential enclave of Makati, Metro Manila, Philippines. The park opened in 2006 and was named after Filipino accountant and banker Washington SyCip. In addition to many indigenous tropical trees and plants, the park contains gazebos and recreational spaces.

The park is open daily from 06:00 to 22:00 PST (GMT+8). It is a no-smoking, no pet zone.

== Location ==
Washington SyCip Park is rectangular, bounded by Legazpi Street to the north, Gamboa Street to the south, Rada Street to the west, and the Corinthian Plaza carpark to the east. It is located near the Greenbelt shopping centre, the Asian Institute of Management, Legazpi Active Park and the Union Church of Manila.

== History ==
Washington SyCip Park was established in 2006 by Ayala Land. The park was presented to SyCip in June 2006 (his 85th birthday), in recognition of his outstanding contributions to the Philippine business community.

The park was developed jointly by Ayala Land Incorporated, the Makati Commercial Estate Association (MACEA), the City of Makati, Barangay San Lorenzo, and Washington SyCip's SyCip Gorres Velayo & Co., the largest accounting and consulting firm in the Philippines. The headquarters of MACEA is located on the northern edge of the park.

In 2017, the park underwent a seven-month renovation, which was completed in December.

== Sculptures ==
Several sculptures by Filipino sculptor and artist Impy Pilapil can be found in the park. These include:

- Wishing Stone - a wishing stone, with a twig quill and water reservoir, on which people can write their wishes.
- Faith - an obelisk-like white stone sculpture with a pointed edge, reaching for the heavens.
- Entry - a Stonehenge-style gate made of white stone.
- Sungka - a traditional Filipino board game played with shells.
- The Mangrove Nature Embrace - a colorful framework, with blue as the dominant color, constructed from steel pipes.
- Stone turtles: - a Chinese symbol of long life, stone turtles can be found at the northern and southern entrances to the park.
- Giant urns: - giant stone urns flank one gateway of the park, likely a throwback to SyCip’s childhood years in Shanghai. In his biography, SyCip recounted that similar huge jars were found in his family's garden, and he used to peek at the fish swimming inside them.

== Gallery ==
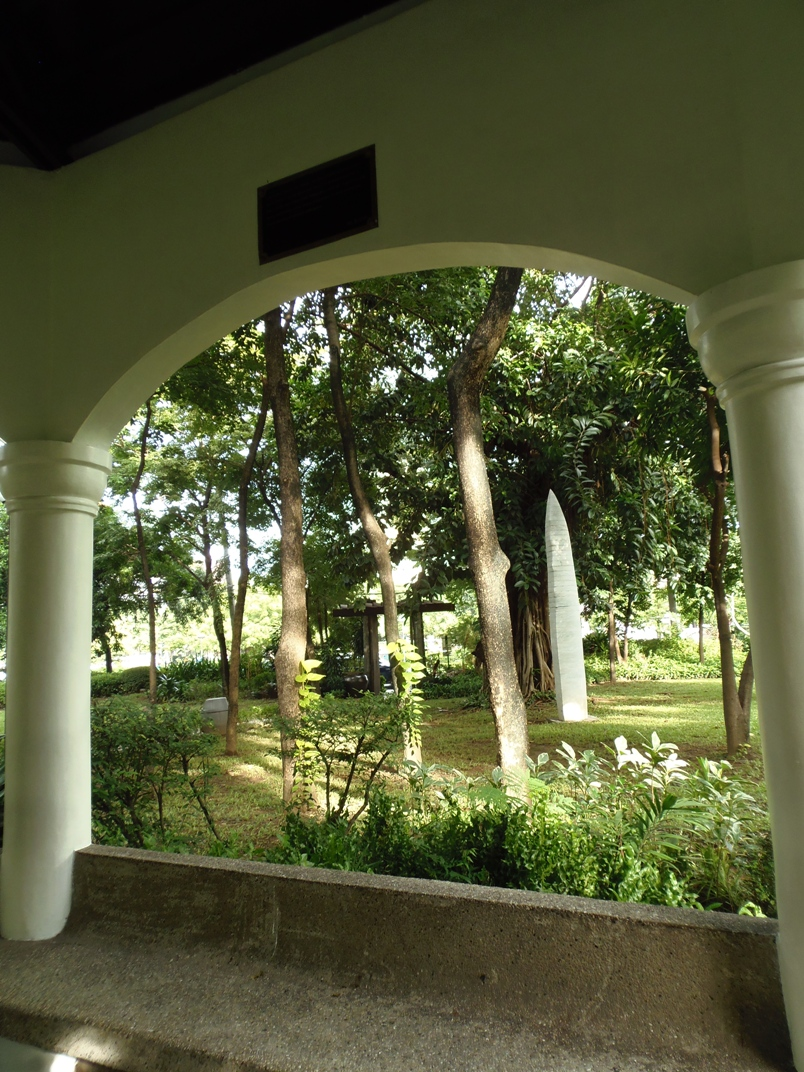
A gazebo at the Washington SyCip Park

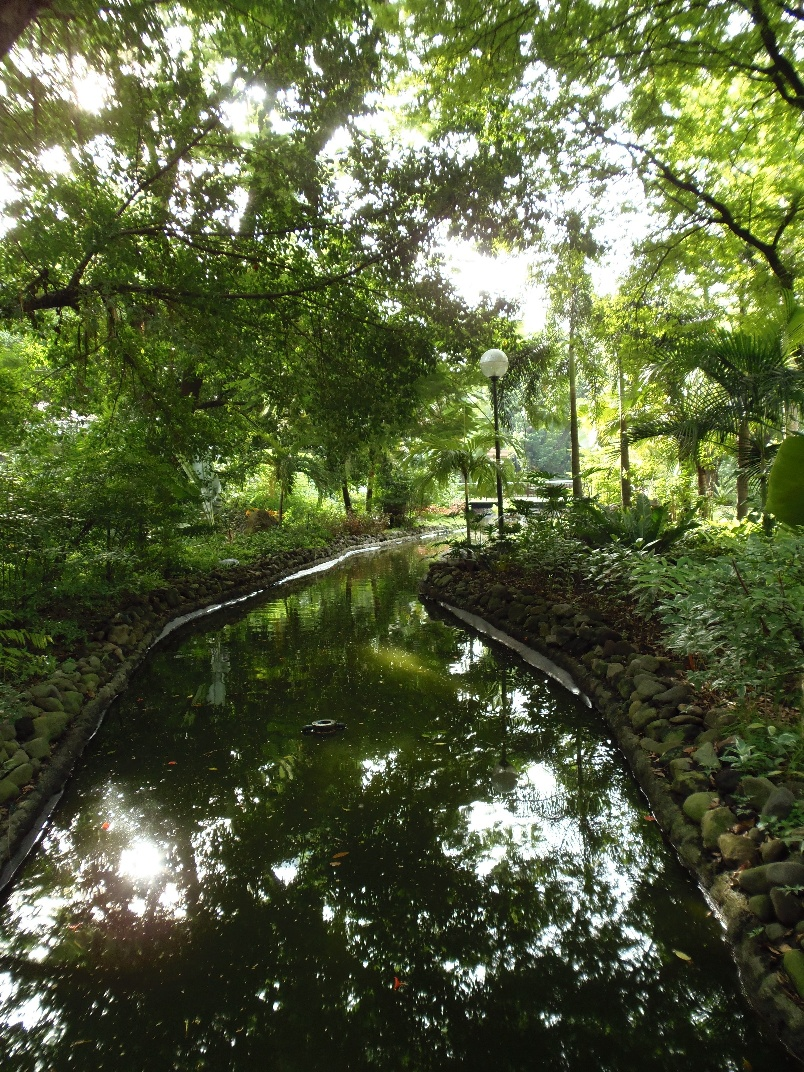
The Koi pond

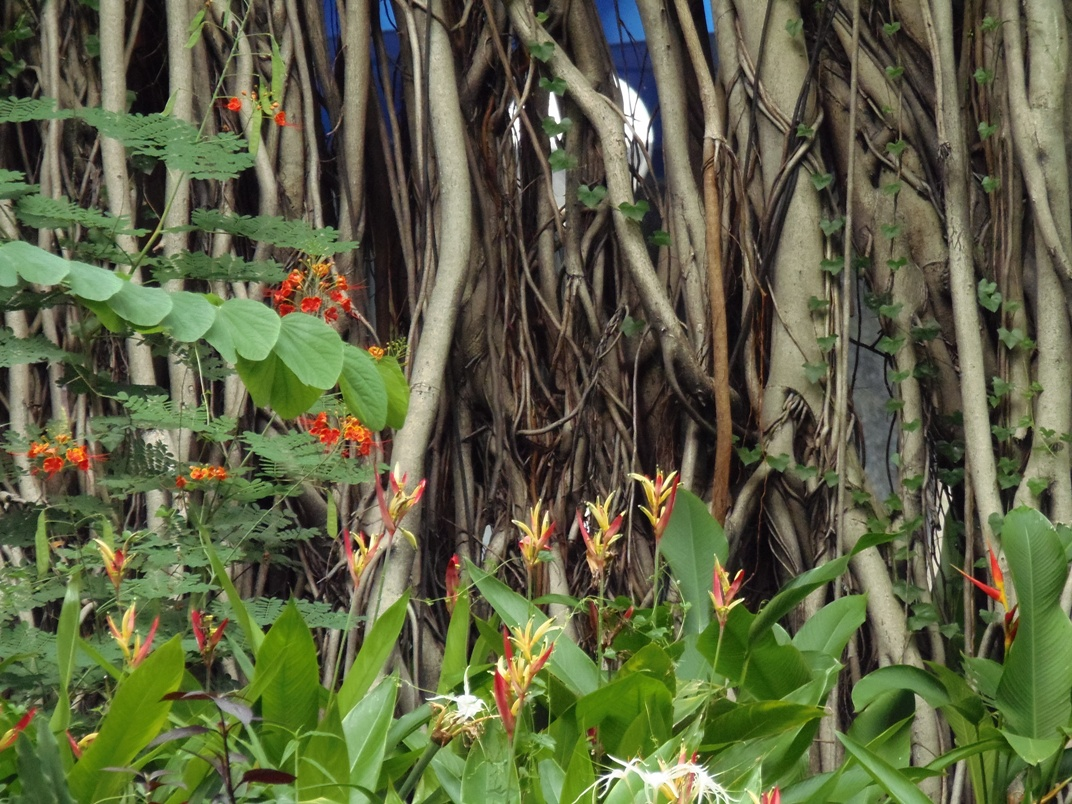
A Balete tree at the park

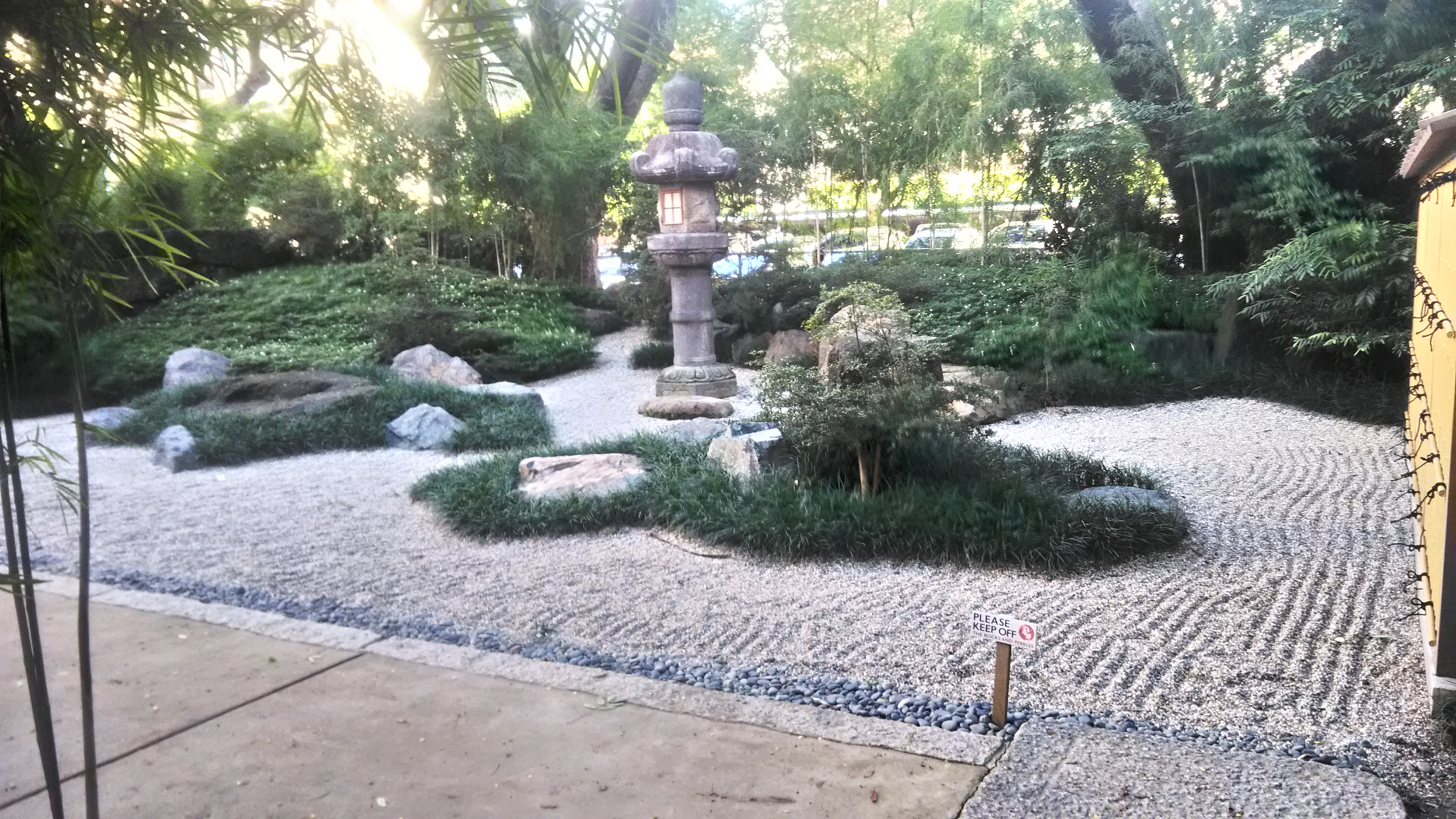
A Japanese rock garden at the park's Crane and Turtle Garden.

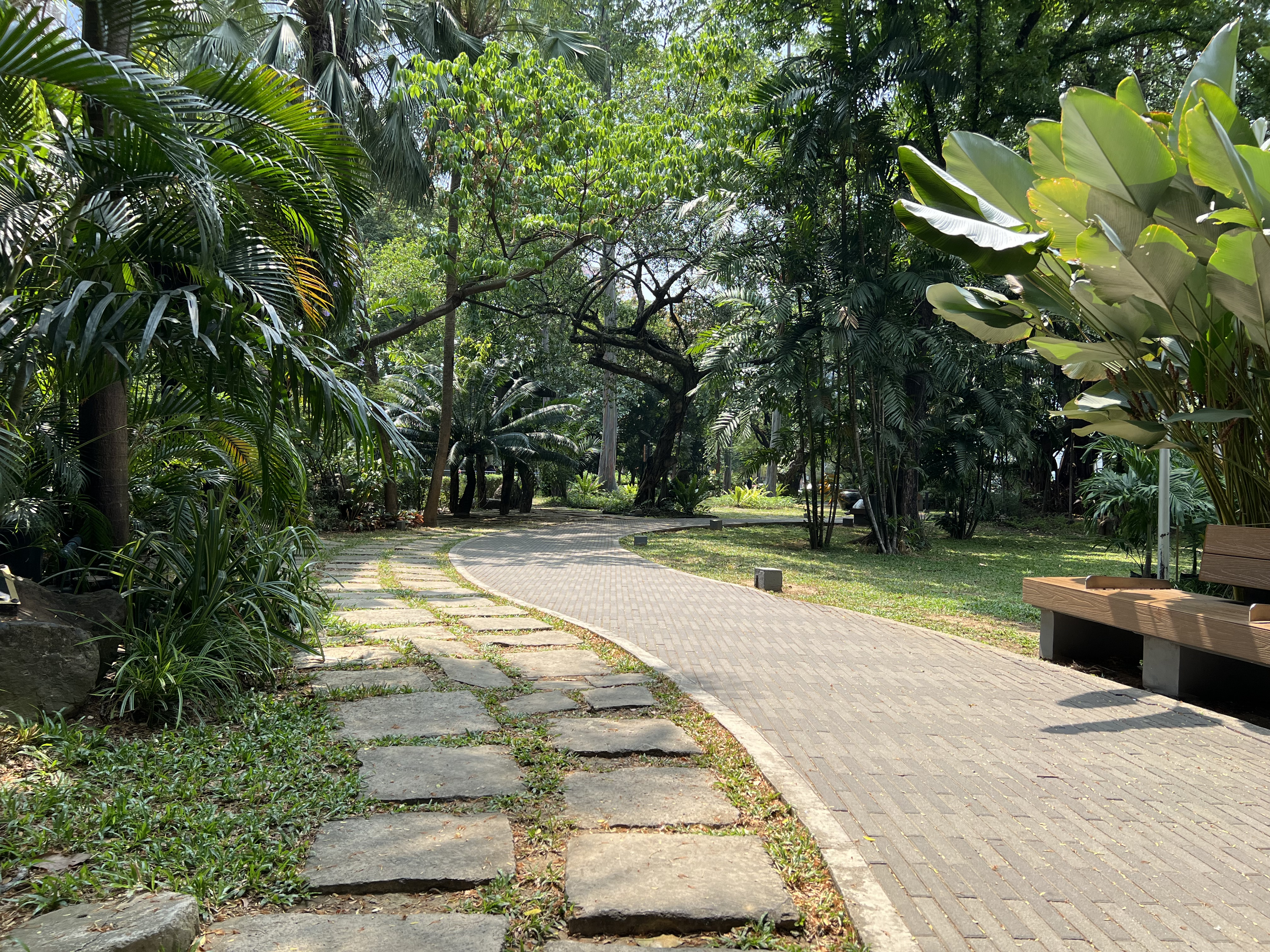
A pathway within the park

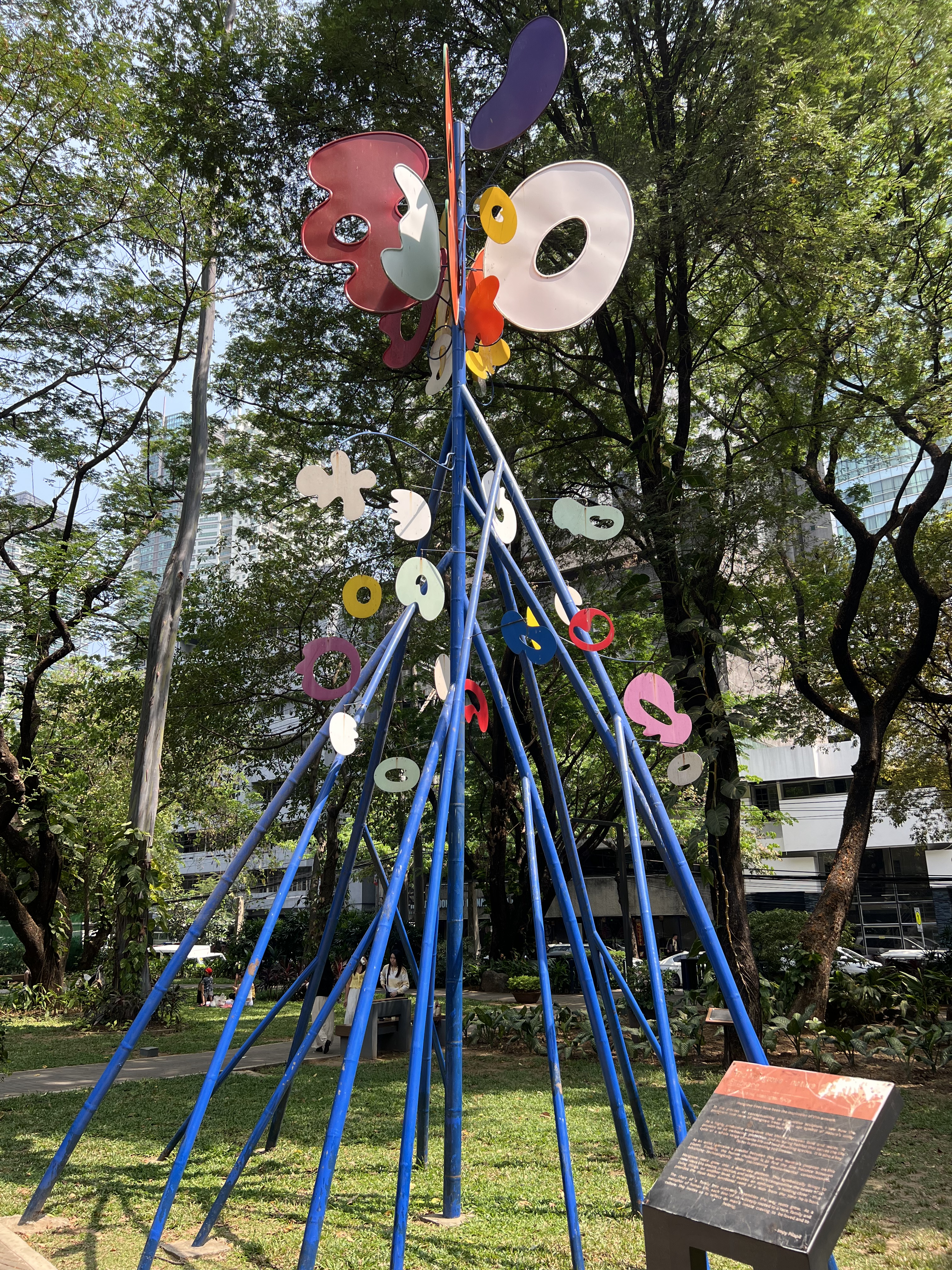
The Mangrove Nature Embrace sculpture

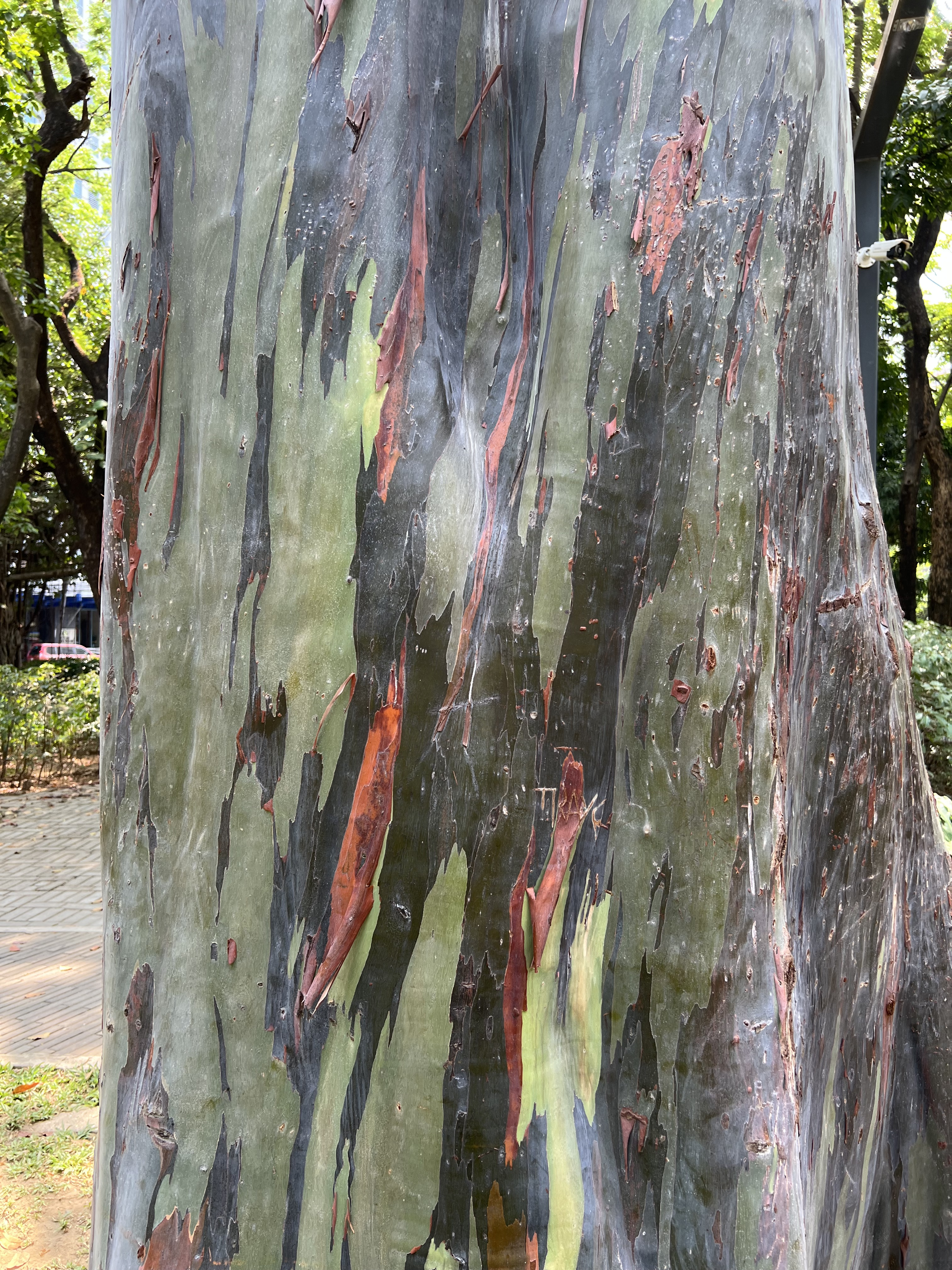
Rainbow eucalyptus (Eucalyptus deglupta) within the park

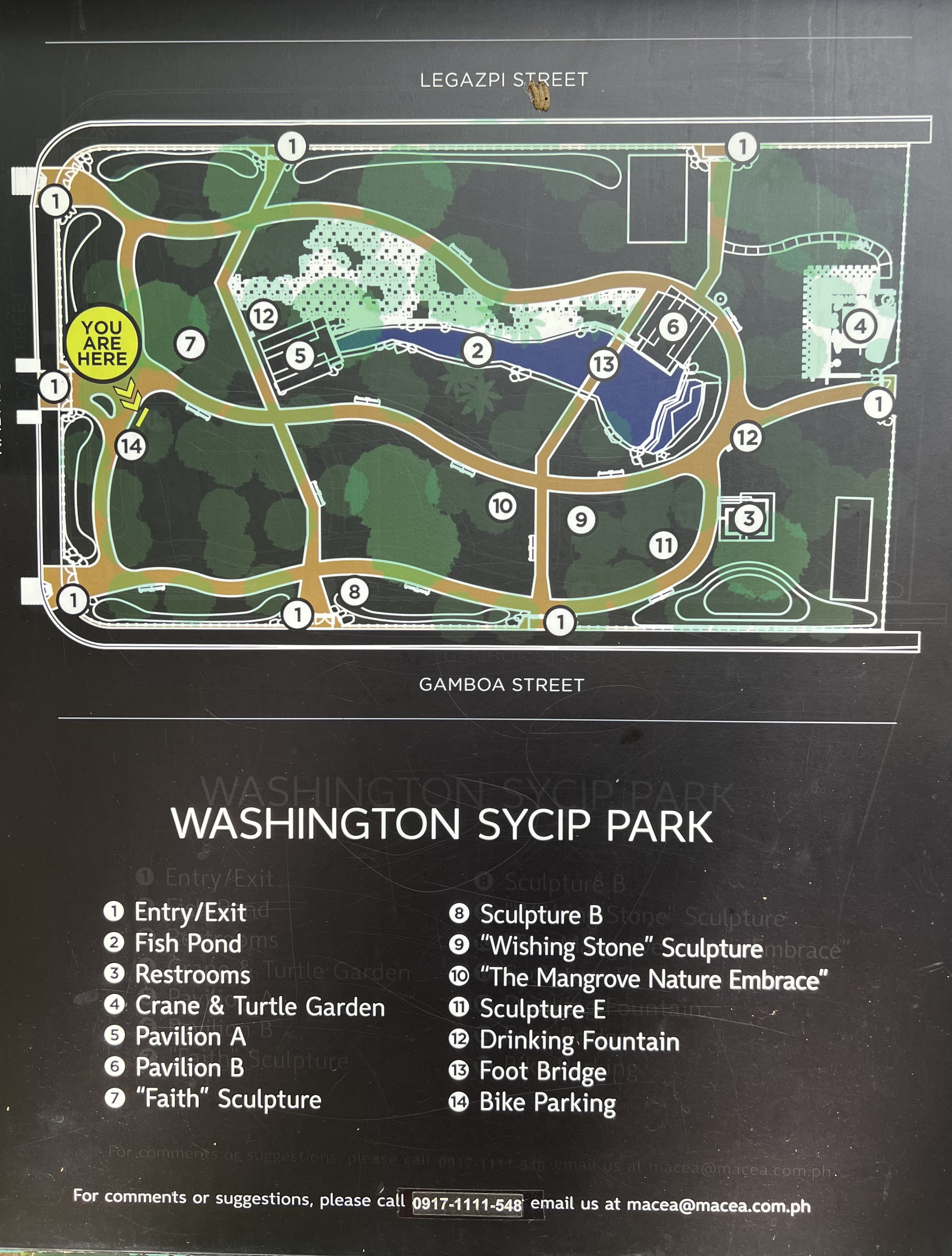
A directory sign within the park

== See also ==
- List of parks in Manila
