= Salcedo Park =

Park in Makati, Philippines

Coordinates: 14°33′36″N 121°1′22″E

- Jaime C. Velasquez Park
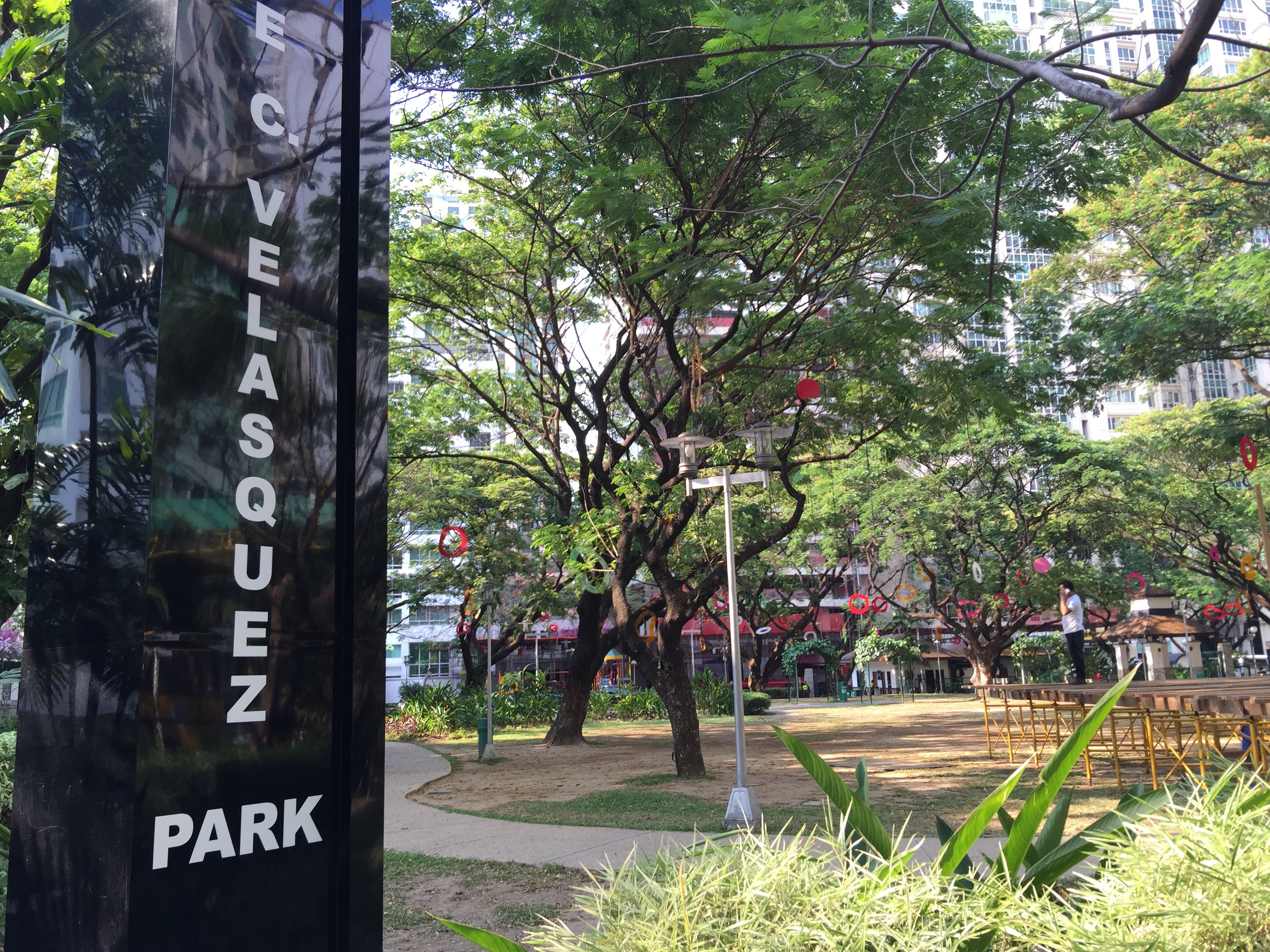
- Interactive map of Salcedo Park
- Type: Urban park
- Location: Makati, Philippines
- Area: 0.7 hectares (7,000 m^{2})
- Created: 2001
- Operator: Makati Commercial Estate Association; Ayala Land
- Status: Opened

Jaime C. Velasquez Park, commonly referred to as Salcedo Park, is a pocket park in Makati, Metro Manila, Philippines. It is one of four pockets of greenery located in the central business district within Salcedo Village in barangay Bel-Air. The park is the site of a popular weekend market called the Salcedo Community Market. It is also the main venue of the bi-annual contemporary art fair called Art in the Park.

== Overview ==
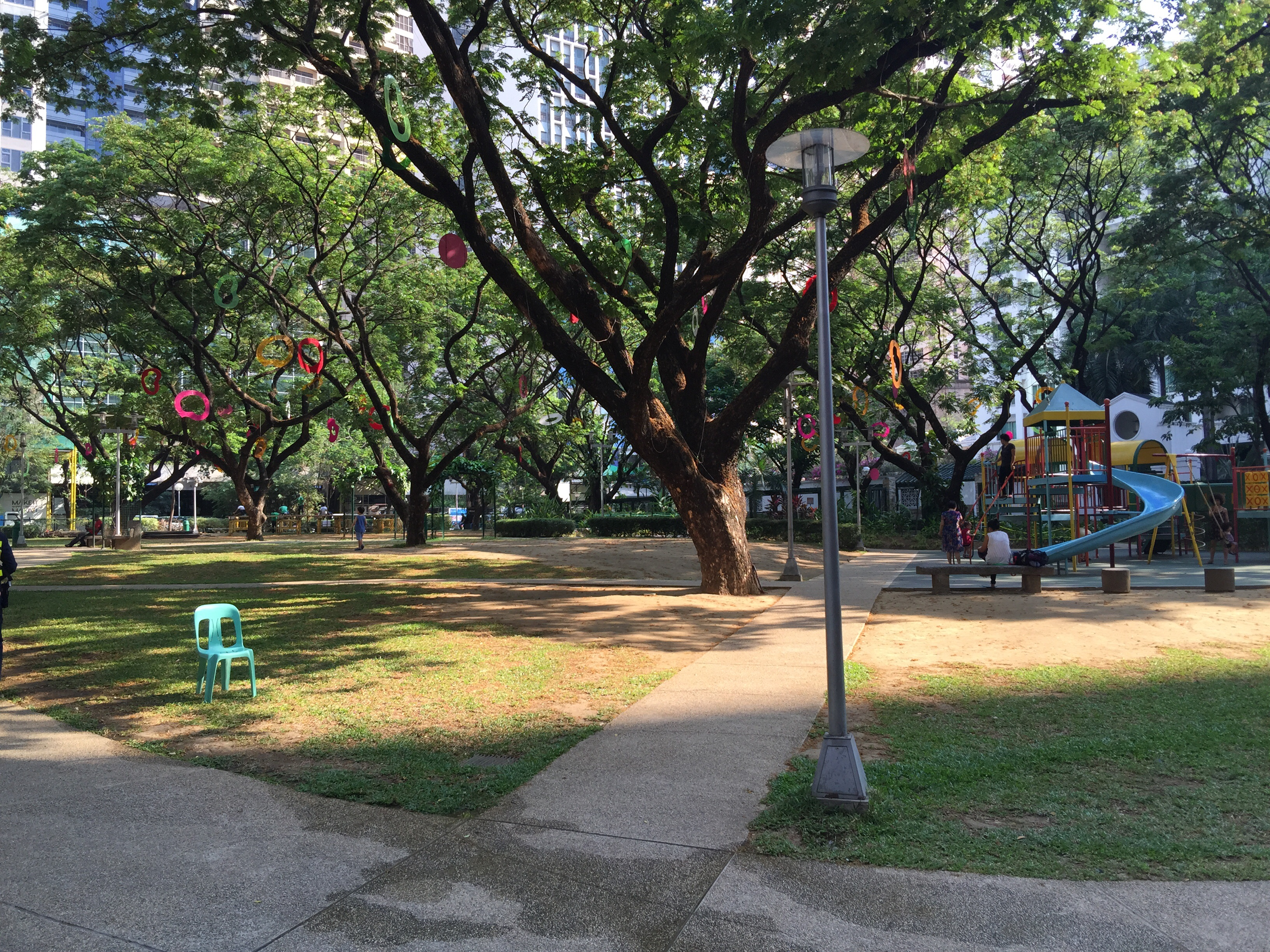
Southwest view of Salcedo Park from Tordesillas Street entrance

Salcedo Park is a 0.7-hectare (1.7-acre) small urban community park in the Makati CBD north of Paseo de Roxas and south of Gil Puyat Avenue. It lies in a mixed residential and commercial zone between Tordesillas Street and L.P. Leviste Street to the north and south, and between Toledo Street and Jaime C. Velasquez Street to the east and west. It is surrounded by several residential skyscrapers, including Paseo Heights, Salcedo Place and Four Seasons towers of Megaworld Corporation and Escala Salcedo of Ayala Land subsidiary Alveo. The park was named after Col. Jaime Camacho Velasquez, a 1931 U.S. Military Academy graduate, World War II veteran, former director of Ayala Corporation and one of the chief implementors of the development of the Makati CBD.

The park features a children's playground, a trellised walkway on one side of the park, grassy lawn, and stone benches. It also hosts a community center, a Bel-Air tanod office, and a satellite clinic with public restrooms.

== Salcedo Weekend Market ==
The Salcedo Community Market is a weekend market and one of Metro Manila's most popular outdoor markets located in Salcedo Park and its adjoining parking lot in Salcedo Village. It is open every Saturday from 7am to 2pm and is one of two weekend markets in the Makati CBD, the other market being the Legazpi Sunday Market in Legazpi Active Park, San Lorenzo Village which takes place on Sundays. The Salcedo Community Market was conceptualized in 2004. It was then officially formed and opened a year later. The Salcedo market was established by a group of expat residents from surrounding condominiums which patterned it after European village markets. It had an initial 27 merchants and was organized by then Bel-Air Village captain Nene Lichauco. After 6 years, the market grew to become the home of 150 merchants that offer different regional cuisine from the Ilocos, Pampanga and Bicol, as well as several international gourmet foods including French, Thai and Indonesian organic produce. Local desserts and delicacies are also a major staple of the market which also provides an outdoor communal dining area for shoppers and diners. The Salcedo Market also sells organic plants, flowers, healthy supplements, ceramics and other house wares.

== Events ==
=== Art in the Park ===
Art in the Park is a bi-annual modern art fair that takes place during summer at the Salcedo Park. It offers a wide selection of works from paintings to photographs, as well as sculpture and pottery, with prices below ₱40,000. The art fair was founded in 2006 by Philippine Art Events, Inc. and the Museum Foundation of the Philippines supported by the National Museum of the Philippines. From an initial twelve art galleries housed in several tents occupying a portion of the park, the art fair now comprises 60 art galleries, collectives and student groups and has since expanded to the adjacent parking lot. At least a dozen concessionaires provide food and drinks at the park, and entertainment is also provided with several jazz performances throughout the day. It is sponsored by Barangay Bel-Air, Makati Commercial Estate Association, Inc., Bank of the Philippine Islands, Globe Telecom, and Alveo.

=== Salcedo Nights Live ===
Salcedo Nights Live is an annual concert at the Salcedo Park sponsored by the Cultural Center of the Philippines as part of its Arts for Transformation and Outreach Programs. It features performances from several classical musicians, choirs and orchestras and is co-produced by the Women of Bel-Air Foundation, Inc., Barangay Bel-Air, Makati Commercial Estate Association, Inc., and the Department of Tourism.

== See also ==
- List of parks in Metro Manila
