= Legazpi Active Park =

Public space and pocket park in Makati Central Business District

Coordinates: 14°33′15″N 121°0′59″E

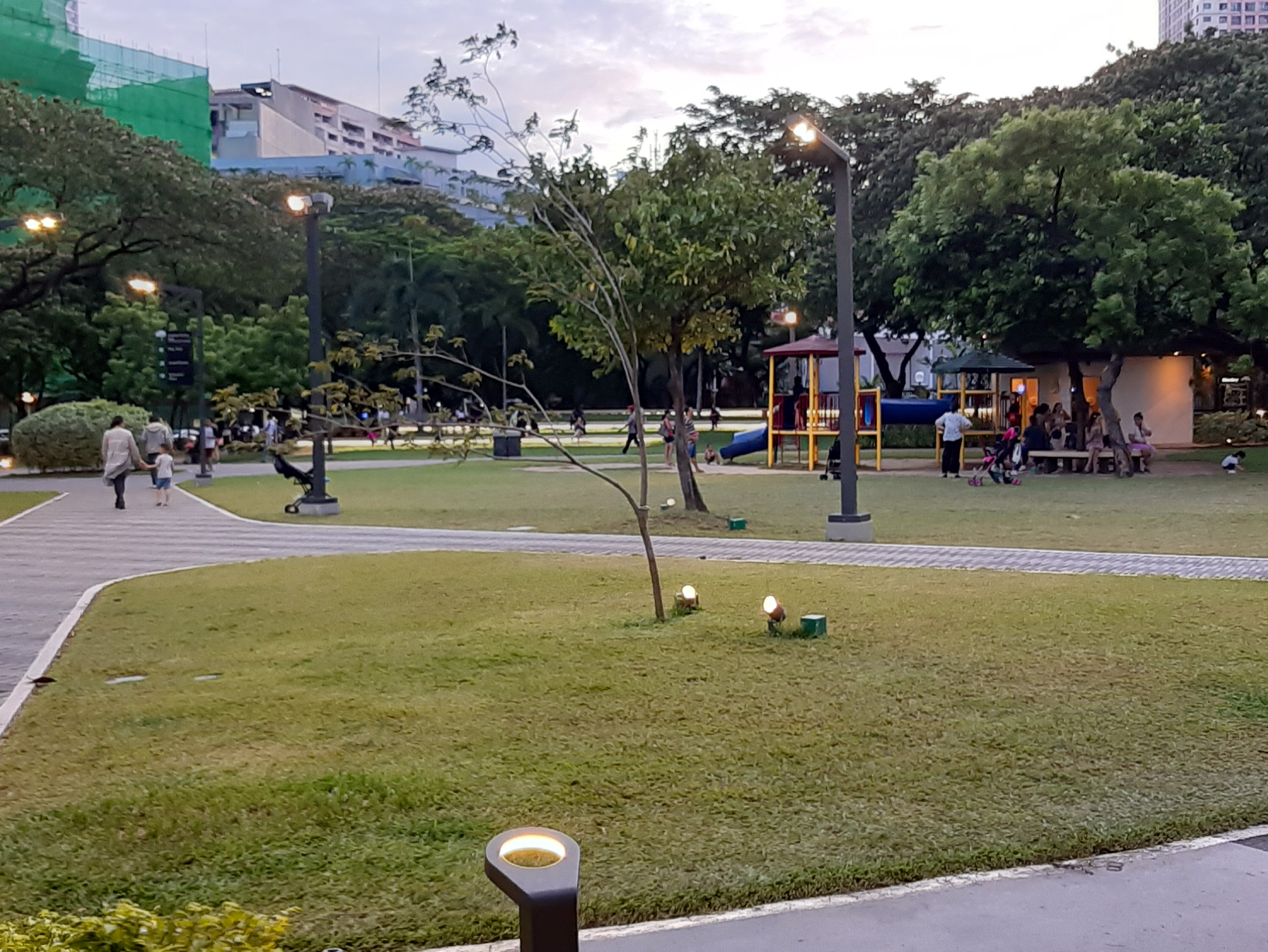
- View of the park from Legazpi Street entrance
- Interactive map of Legazpi Active Park
- Type: Urban park
- Location: Makati, Philippines
- Area: 0.75 hectares (7,500 m^{2})
- Created: 2001
- Operator: Makati Commercial Estate Association; Ayala Land
- Status: Opened

The Legazpi Active Park (sometimes spelled Legaspi) is a privately owned public space and pocket park in the Makati Central Business District in Makati, Metro Manila, Philippines. It is located in Legazpi Village in the western side of the CBD, adjacent to Washington SyCip Park and near Greenbelt. The park, best known as the location of a weekend market known as the Legazpi Sunday Market, is maintained by the Makati Commercial Estate Association which is headquartered in a two-storey building at the adjoining parking lot since 2017. Its name is in reference to its location along Legazpi Street within the formerly gated Legazpi Village that was merged with the neighboring gated San Lorenzo Village to form Barangay San Lorenzo.

== Overview ==
The 0.75-hectare (1.9-acre) park occupies the southern third of an L-shaped block bounded by Rufino and Legazpi streets to the north, Rada (Thailand) Street to the east, Salcedo Street to the west, and Gamboa Street to the south. It sits next to a parking lot containing the CBD administration building and is framed by a mix of office and residential towers. The park is in the quieter side of Legazpi Village, midway between Greenbelt and Makati Medical Center. It is equipped with park benches, tiled walkways and jogging paths, a children's playground, and washrooms.

The park, as its name suggests, is the active counterpart of the adjacent "passive" Washington SyCip Park. It is a fitness park for outdoor activities such as calisthenics, yoga, jogging, frisbee, and cycling. The Makati Commercial Estate Association moved in to its new home at the active park in 2017 after 24 years being headquartered at the former Legazpi Village Mini Park. The park underwent a seven-month reconstruction in the same year and now features a collection of ornamental plants and improved landscape design.

== Legazpi Sunday Market ==
The weekend market was founded in 2005 by Mara Pardo de Tavera, an organic market pioneer and advocate, a year after a similar concept was tested in Salcedo Park on the other side of the central business district. The market operates every Sunday from early morning until early afternoon under an agreement with the local government of San Lorenzo and the Makati Commercial Estate Association. It actually replaced Pardo de Tavera's weekend bazaar called Mara's Organic Market (MOM) which operated at the Greenbelt park since 1994 until its closure in 2004 when reconstruction began at the shopping mall and park.

Like its sister market in Salcedo Village, the Legazpi Sunday Market features a wide variety of items for sale including farm fresh and organic produce from Luzon and Mindanao and homemade local and international foods. It has a strictly vegetarian section and also sells natural personal care products and artisan crafts.

In March 2019, the parking lot beside the Legazpi Active Park was closed down to make way for the construction of a multi-level parking building. According to the Makati Central Estate Association, the Legazpi Sunday Market would be temporarily relocated to the Corinthian Plaza parking lot beside the Asian Institute of Management while construction at the site is ongoing.

== Gallery ==
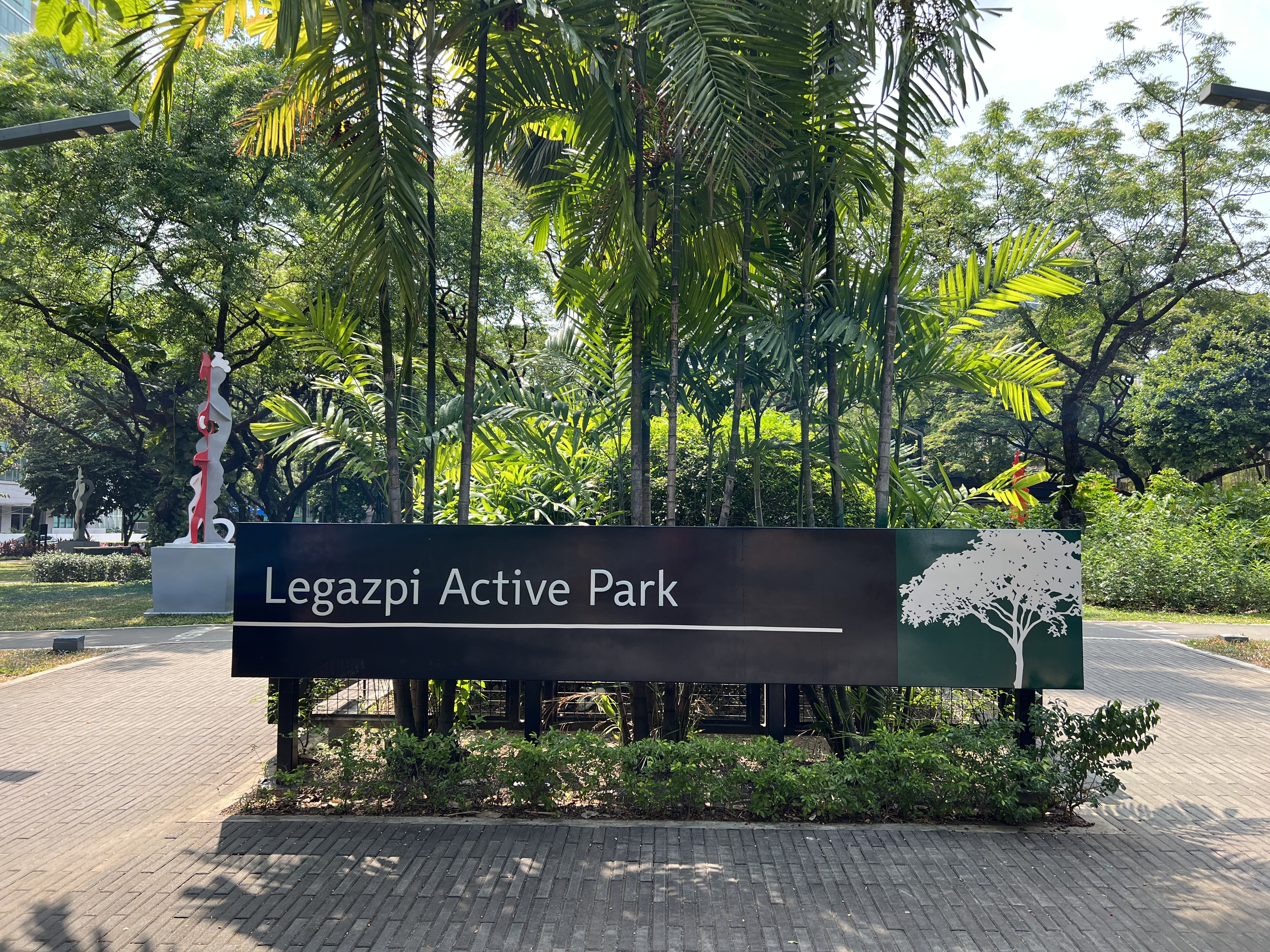
Main entrance

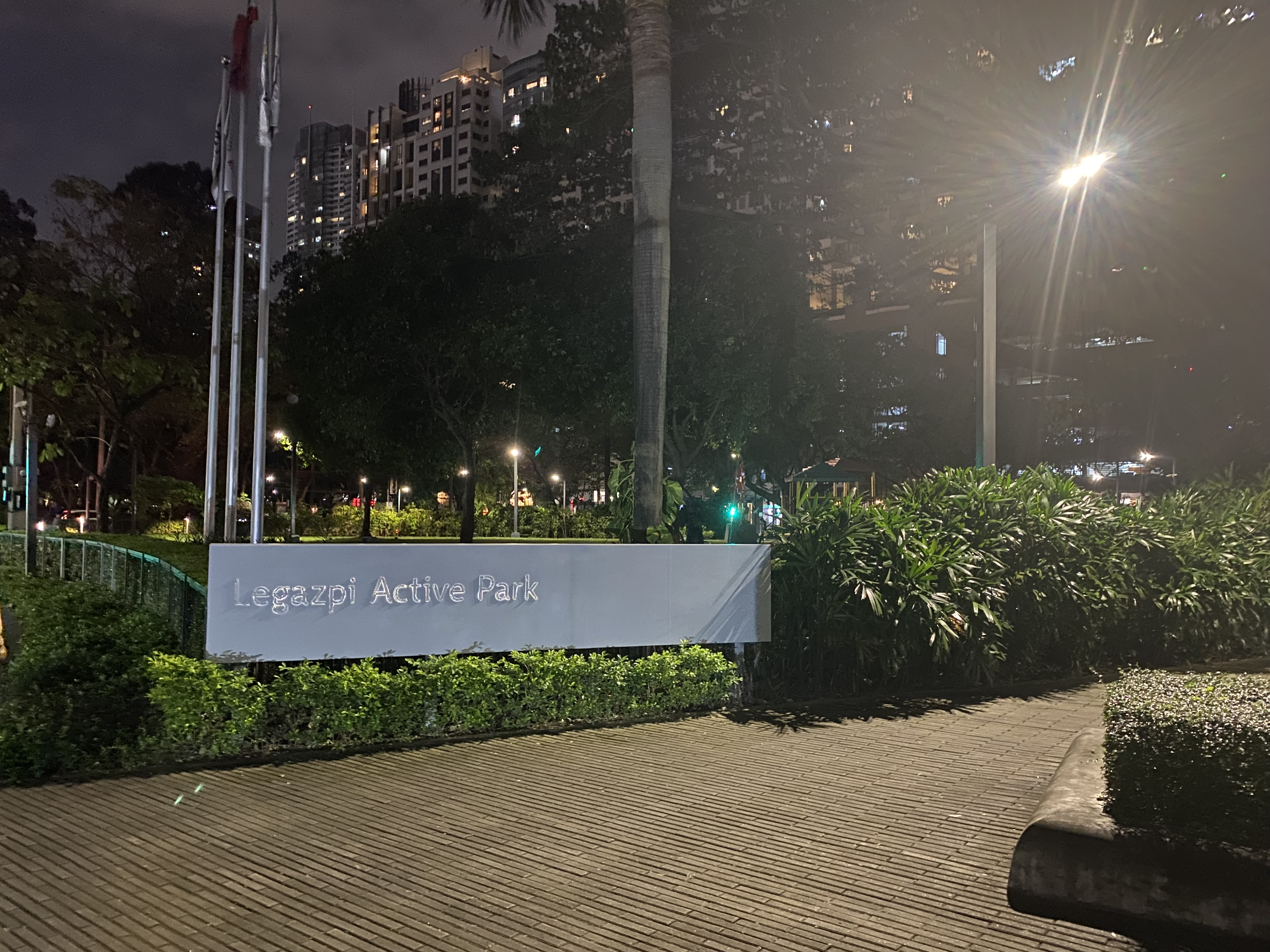
Another entrance to the park at night

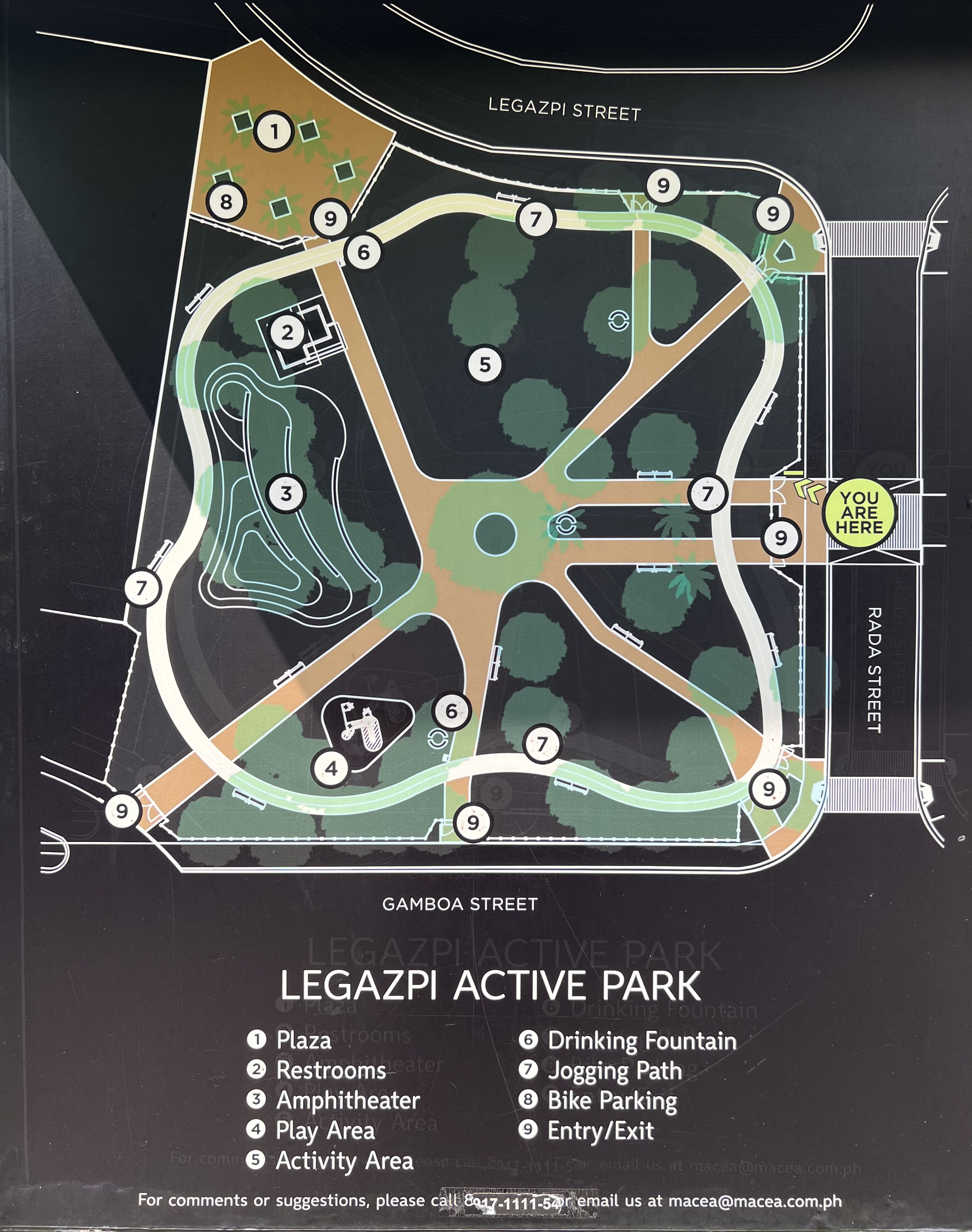
Directory signage within the park

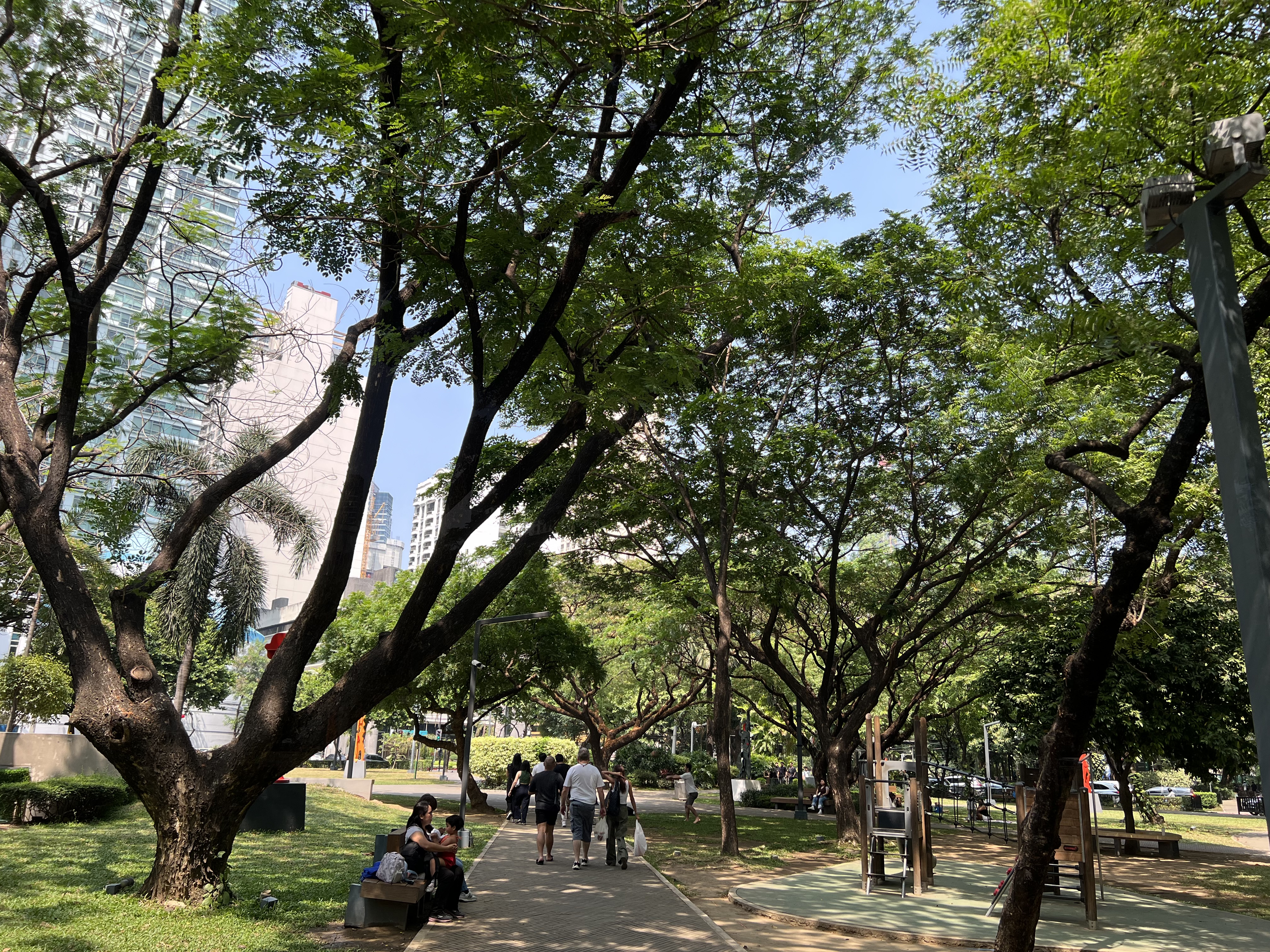
The park on a Sunday afternoon
