= Gozar Planners Architect =

- Type: Partnership
- Industry: Architecture
- Founded: Hong-Kong (1986)
- Founder: Enrique Gozar
- Headquarters: Metro Manila, Philippines
- Area served: Asia-Pacific
- Key people: Enrique Gozar
- Services: Architecture, Building Services/MEP Engineering, Graphics, Interior Design, Structural Engineering, Civil Engineering, Sustainable Design and Urban Design & Planning

Gozar Planners Phils., Inc. is a Philippine architectural and engineering design consultancy firm based in the Asia-Pacific region. It offers structural engineering services on large projects throughout the Philippines and China.

The firm provides services related to arts, crafts, construction, decoration, electronics, furniture, furnishing, lighting, and transportation. Their expertise is engineering architecture, currently covering nine high-rise buildings, such as the residential condominium project of The Metrobank Group at the reclamation area along Roxas Blvd., Pasay. The company was founded by Enrique Gozar in 2001, who is a University of Santo Tomas graduate.

== Notable buildings ==
- Duty Free Complex (1996)
- Axa Life Tower, Ayala Ave., Makati
- Aspac Tower, Shanghai, China
- GT Tower, Ayala Ave., Makati
- Bay Gardens Phase 2
- Shanghai Residential & Office Condos
- Valencia Hills Residential
- Ocean Tower Residential Condo, Roxas Blvd.
- The Metrobank Center, Cebu
- The Metrobank Center, Ortigas
- Forum InterContinental Hotel, Shenzhen
- Tiarra Hotel, Makati
- Furama Hotel, Dalian, China
- Sunrise Delta Hotel, Makati
- Tiarra Oriental Hotel, Makati
- Forum Hotel, Shenzhen, China
- Kempinski Hotel, Hongkong
- Dalian Hotel, Dalian, China
- Ramada Hotel, Guilin, China

== See also ==
- Limketkai Hotel
