= Azure Beach Club Paris Hilton =

Condominium development in Manila, Philippines

Coordinates: 14.48389°N 121.04419°E

- Interactive map of the Azure Beach Club Paris Hilton area

General information
- Status: Completed
- Location: West Service Road corner Doña Soledad Avenue, Marcelo Green, Parañaque, Philippines
- Construction started: 2014
- Opening: 2019
- Owner: Century Properties
- Management: Century Property Management Corp.

Design and construction
- Architect: Broadway Malyan
- Developer: Century Limitless Corp.

Azure Beach Club Paris Hilton, also known as Azure Urban Resort Residences, is an urban condominium development in Parañaque, Metro Manila. The celebrity heiress Paris Hilton licensed her name to the property and is credited with its interior design. Sales on the first tower began in 2014, and the construction of additional towers were finished in 2019.

The condominium was developed by the Century Properties real estate development corporation, which is also responsible for Manila's Trump Tower Manila and The Gramercy Residences high-rises, among others. The property is located in the Parañaque section of Metro Manila, close to the SM Bicutan Supermall and the South Luzon Expressway. The property plans include a wave pool, basketball court, artificial beach, and roof gardens. In addition, it has a bar and a beach club facility bearing Hilton's name.

Hilton has appeared in advertisements for the development, which appear online and in connection to other Century properties. Hilton has also promoted the development on American talk shows. She is featured on the sales website. In addition, Hilton appeared at an event in Manila commemorating the official opening of the building in March 2014.

The property was designed by the English firm Broadway Malyan, which has also designed other Century Properties buildings. Azure Urban Resort Properties, a subsidiary of Century Limitless Corporation manages the property. Although initially the development was planned to have nine towers when completed, currently the company states it plans for seven twenty-story buildings upon completion. Hilton has characterized the licensing deal as her first foray into the real estate business.
