= Poblacion, Makati =

Barangay in Makati, Metro Manila, Philippines

Poblacion
- Barangay
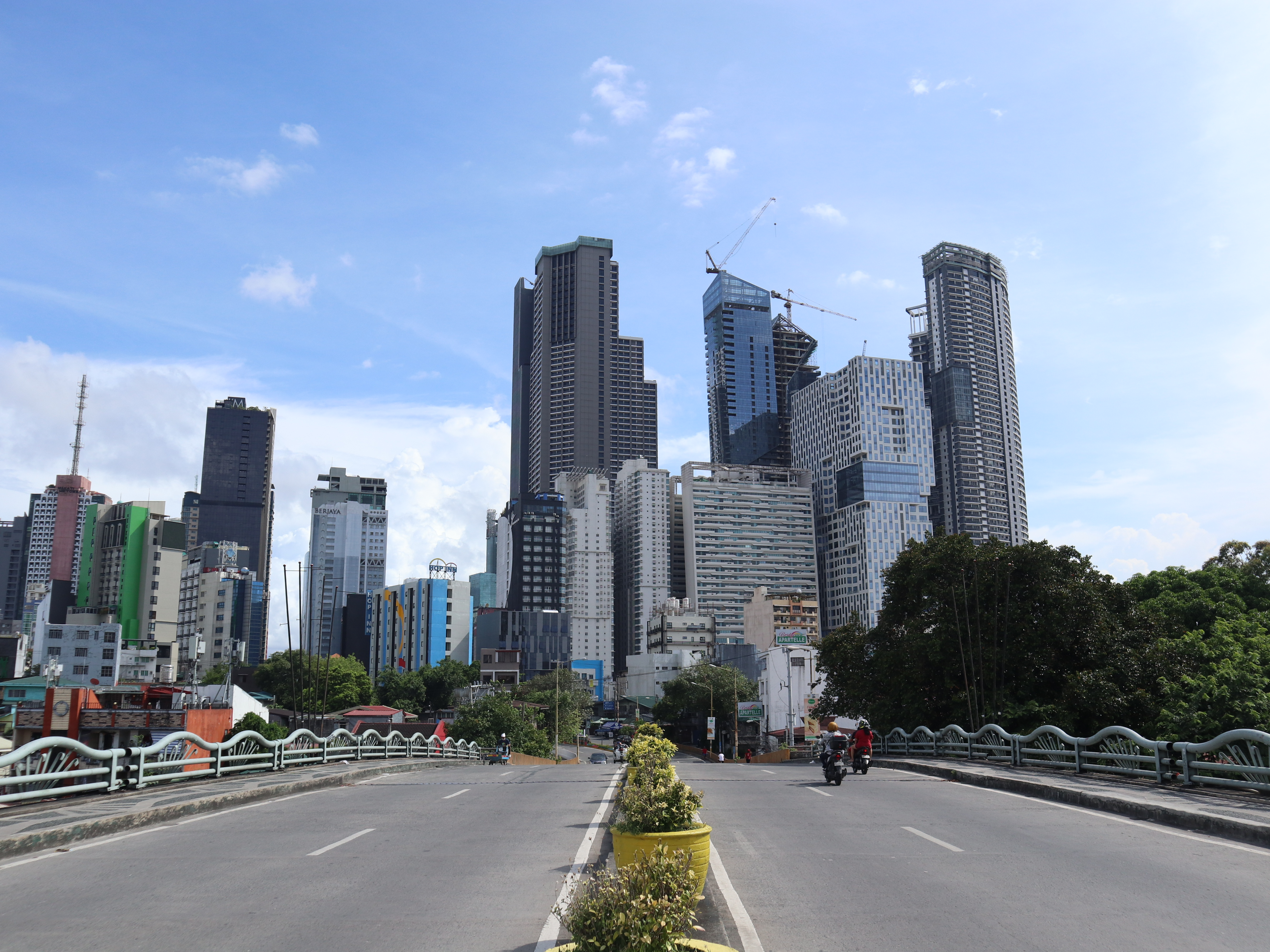
- Century City and surrounding skyscrapers in Poblacion

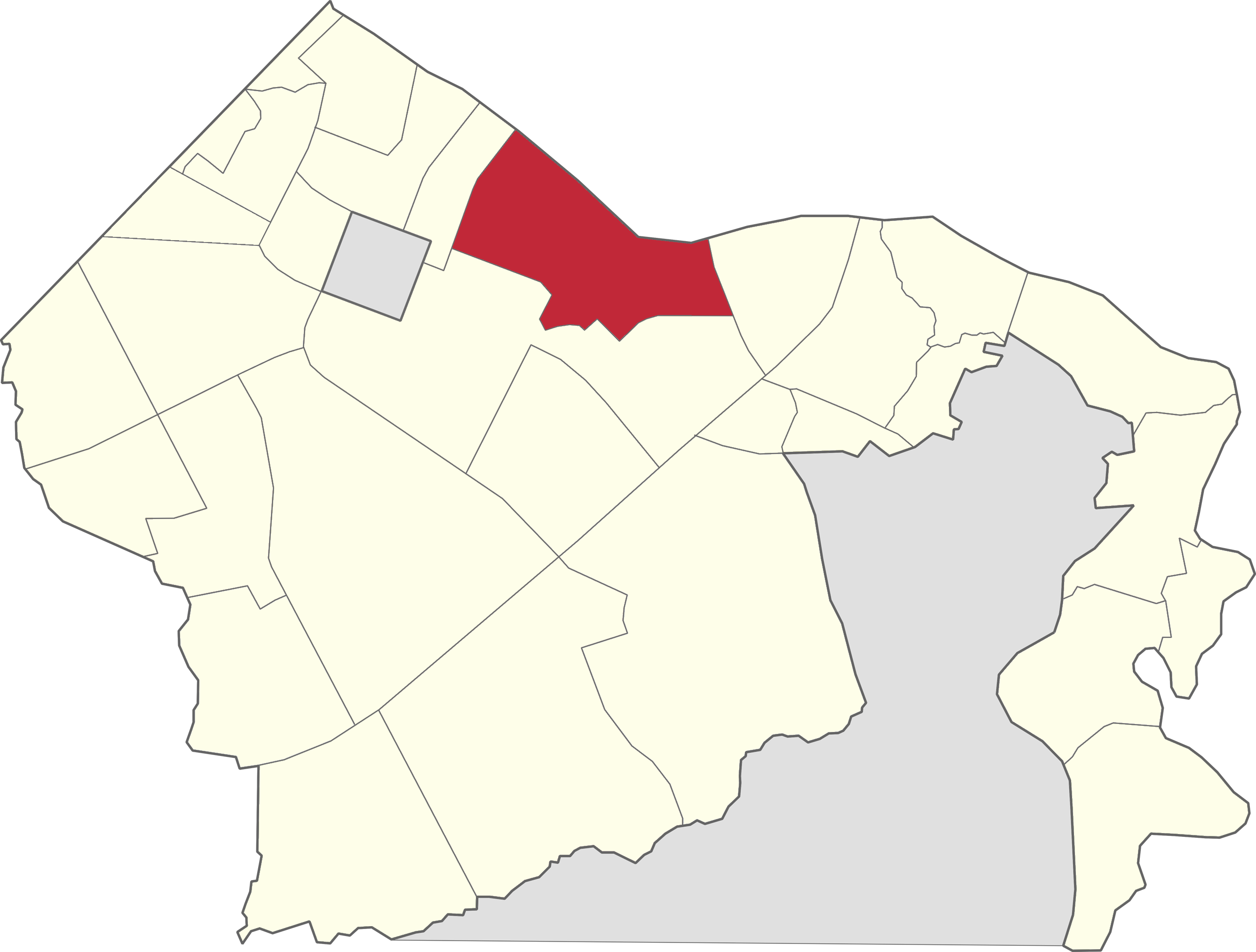
- Location within Makati

- Location within Metro Manila
- Coordinates: 14°33′56.45″N 121°1′55.48″E
- Country: Philippines
- Region: Metro Manila
- City: Makati
- Congressional districts: Part of the 1st district of Makati

Government
  - Barangay Chairman: Jose Mikhail Villena
  - Barangay Councilors: Members: Marcelino Crisolo; Joanna Marie Cruz; Alexander Diez; Mark Anthony Gabutin; Gio Brylle Labares; Kirsten Adrienne Reyes; Jullian Kyle San Mateo
  - SK Chairperson: Phoebe Marie Jara

Area
  - Total: 1.0342 km^{2} (0.3993 sq mi)

Population (2020)
  - Total: 16,706
  - Density: 16,154/km^{2} (41,837/sq mi)
- ZIP code: 1210
- Area code: 2
- PSGC: 137602020

Poblacion is one of the 23 barangays of Makati, Philippines. It is centered on the city's historic poblacion area and serves as the second most important commercial center in Makati behind the Makati Central Business District. It is also the city's center of government, and known for its culture, history and entertainment. It is a major business district of Metro Manila.

Poblacion belongs to the 1st Congressional District of Makati. It is bounded by Nicanor Garcia Street, Antipolo Street, and Barangay Valenzuela to the west, Kalayaan Avenue and Bel-Air Village to the south, Estrella Street and Guadalupe Viejo to the west, and the Pasig River to the north. It is also home to the upscale Rockwell Center and Century City developments.

It has a total land area of 1.0342 square kilometers (0.3993 sq mi), which constitutes 5.69% of the total land area of Makati. 5.71% or 16,706 of Makati residents also live in this area, with a population density of 16,000 inhabitants per square kilometer or 41,000 inhabitants per square mile.

== History ==
=== Pre-WWII ===
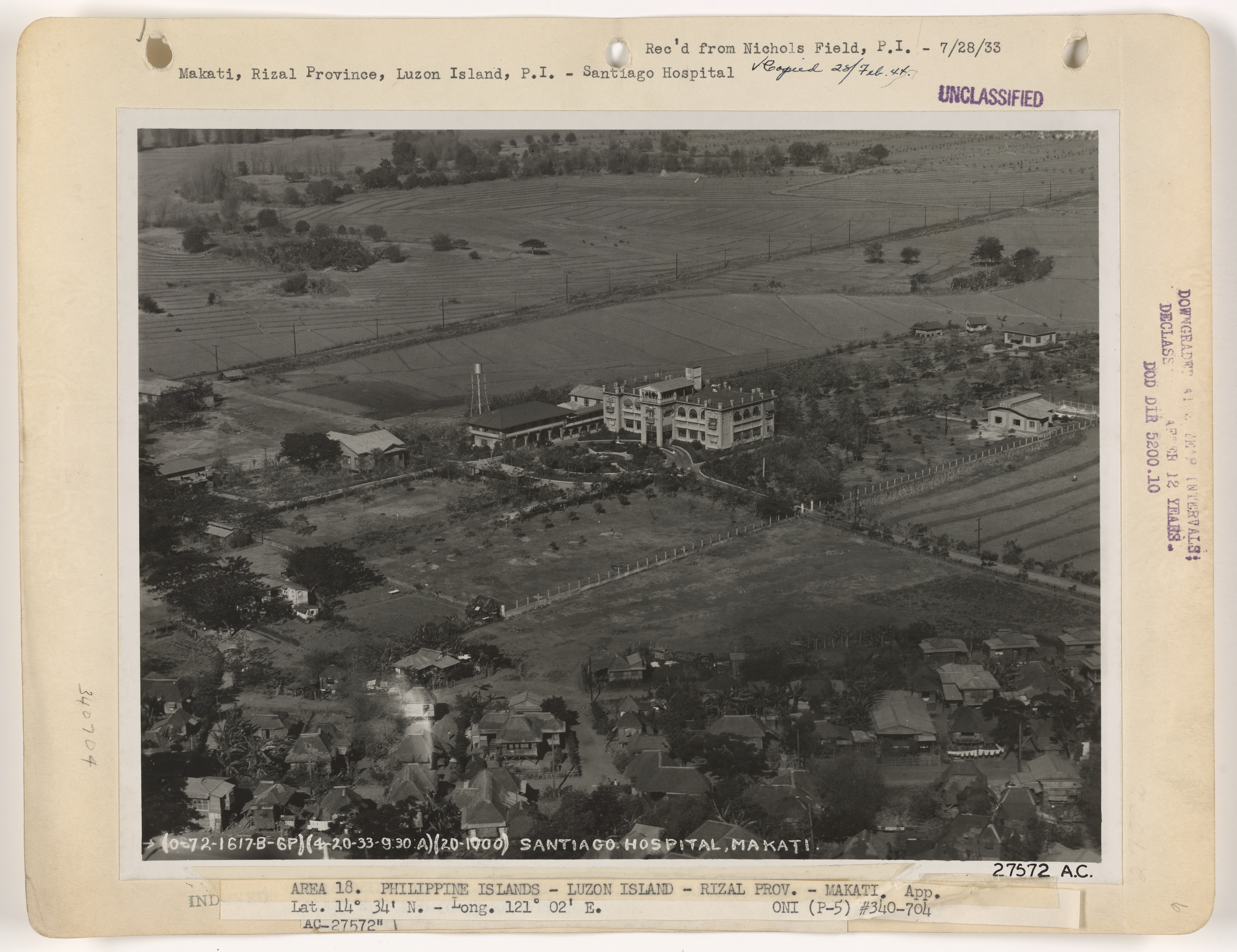
Aerial view of Hospital Español de Santiago, 1933

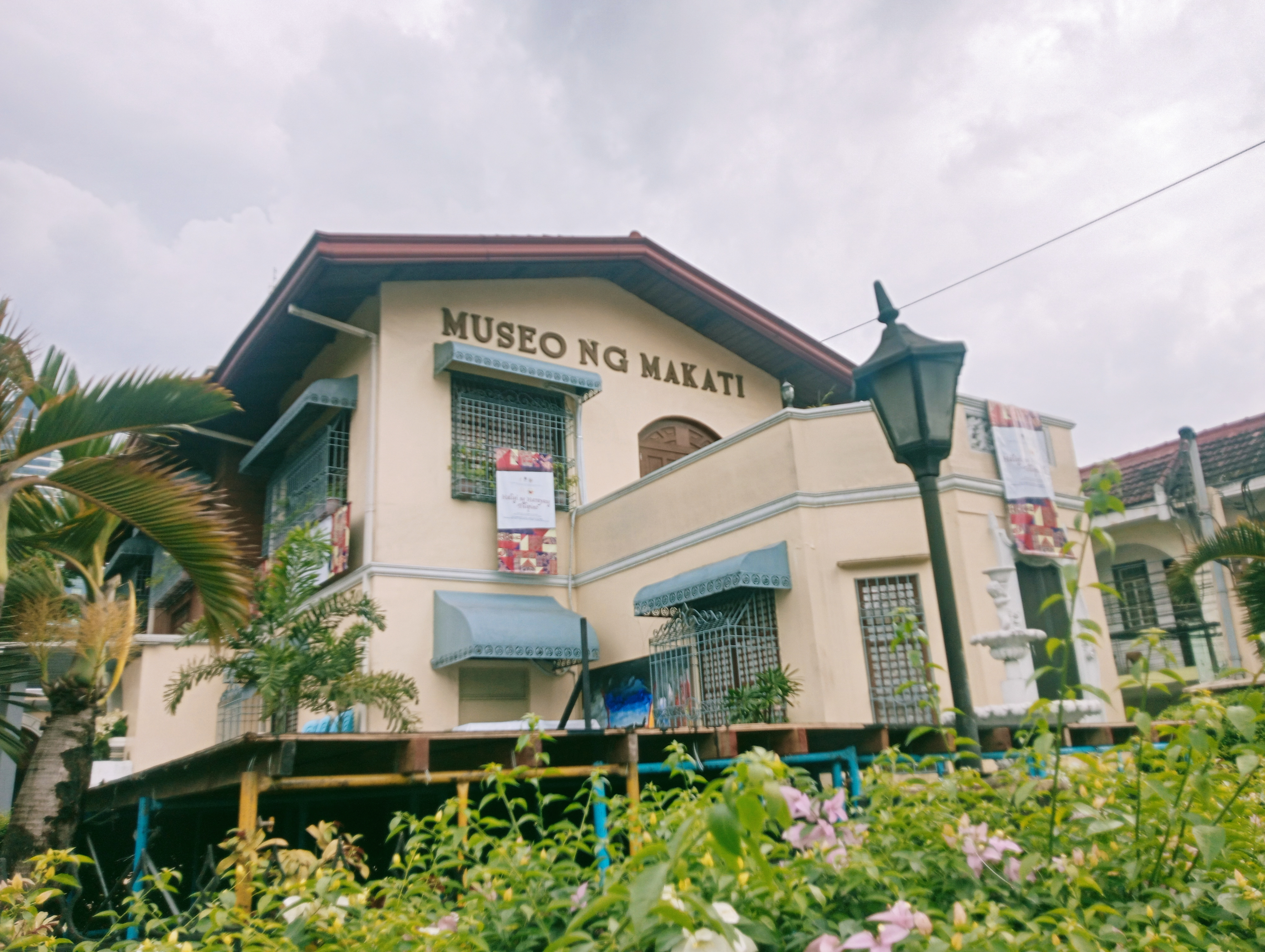
Museo ng Makati along J.P. Rizal Avenue

Barangay Poblacion is the first settlement of Makati. In fact, when one would mention San Pedro Macati during the pre-war period, it indicated Barangay Poblacion. Since it was the original community of the town, it became the center of the local government and has remained as such today.

In 1620, the San Pedro Church was built by the Jesuits as the center of the Catholic faith of then San Pedro Macati. The residents corrupted this name to "Sampiro" and used this moniker to refer to both the church and the town. When the Jesuits were expelled from all Spanish territories in the 18th century, the Spanish government confiscated all their properties which included San Pedro Macati. This began the turnover of the land from one owner to another until the Zobel de Ayala-Roxas family began its modern development during the latter part of the 19th century.

Official records show that the first municipal president of Makati was Marcelino Magsaysay, who hails from Poblacion. Most of the succeeding municipal presidents or mayors were likewise bona fide constituents of Poblacion namely: Eusebio Arpilleda, Hermogenes Santos, Urbano Navarro, Jose Magsaysay, Pedro Domingo, Ricardo Arpilleda, Nicanor Garcia, Jose Villena and Maximo Estrella.

The first municipal building, the Presidencia, was built in 1918 in the middle of Poblacion at Plaza Trece de Agosto, now J.P. Rizal Street. It is now occupied today by the Museo ng Makati.

What is now today Kalayaan Avenue was built in the early 20th century as the Meralco streetcar line from Paco to Pasig (formerly the Manila Suburban Railway). The building of the line partly led to a residential and commercial boom in the town proper.

=== Post-WWII ===
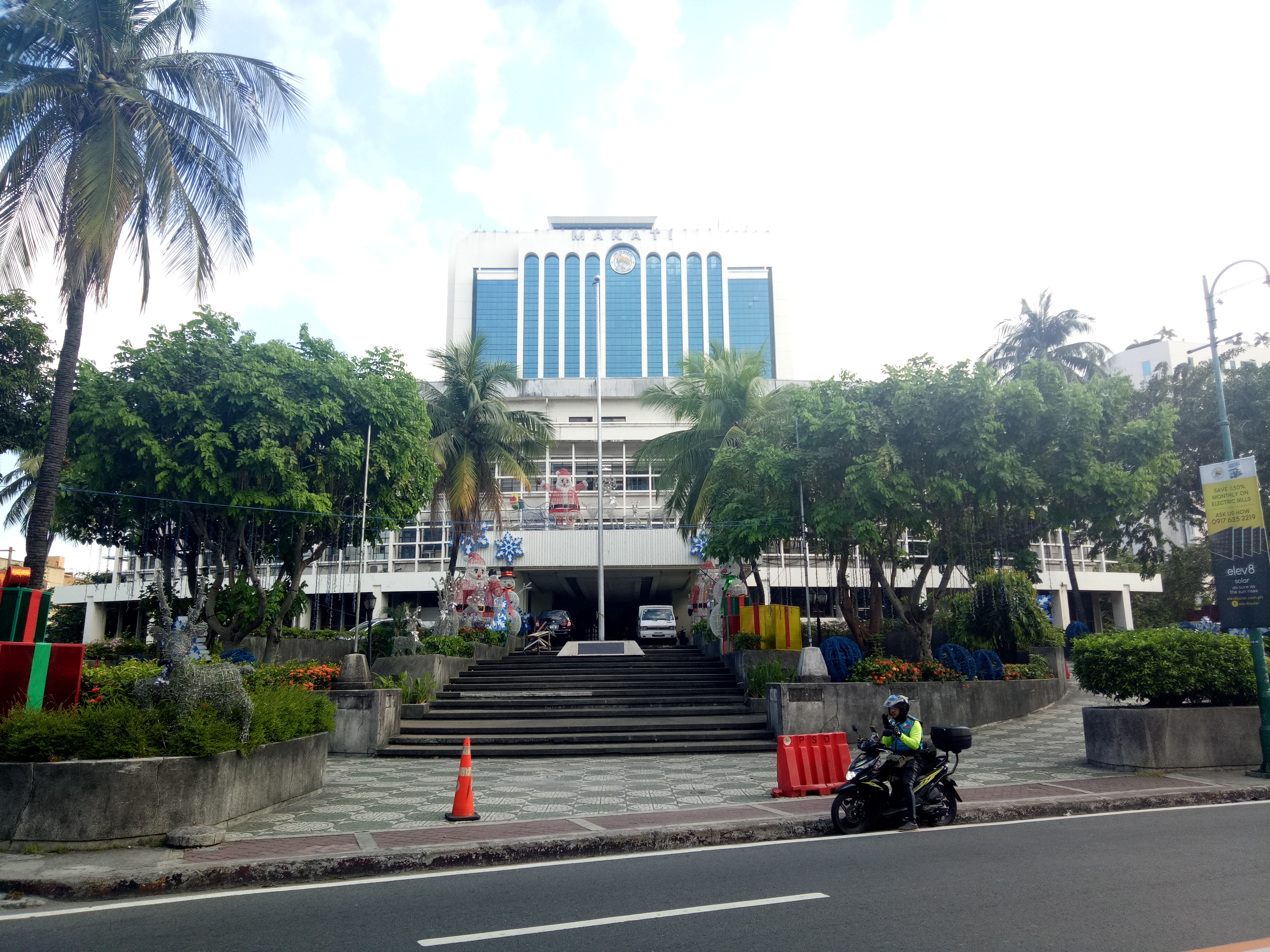
The old and new Makati City Hall

From 1954 up to the late 1980s, Poblacion was served by the James Rockwell Power Plant owned by Meralco, one of many to be built within the capital region to provide electricity to millions of its residents.

In 1961, Mayor Maximo Estrella ordered the construction of a new municipal building in its present site, which was donated by the Ayala Land, Inc. In the early years of the 21st century, Mayor Jejomar Binay instituted the high-rise 22-storey City Hall of Makati, making Poblacion as the center of Makati's government then and now.

In 2006 and 2007, local and foreign urban planning consultants and other public and private sector partners conducted a Cultural Mapping Report of the Heritage of Poblacion, through the grant of the Instituto Cervantes Spanish Program for Cultural Cooperation.

Although Poblacion has kept its old-world charm, it has also embraced modernity and economic development with the presence of a number of commercial establishments in the area, specifically along the main thoroughfares of J.P. Rizal, Makati Avenue, P. Burgos and Kalayaan, the Rockwell Center, the A. Venue Mall and Suites and the upcoming development by Century Properties in the old site of the International School called the Century City.

In 2020, the Sangguniang Barangay of Poblacion approved Barangay Resolution No. 2020-689 objecting to the name of Poblacion being shortened to "Pobla" by patrons of the commercial establishments in the area. The resolution cites that the residents of Poblacion "highly considers [sic] the image and values the rich heritage of Poblacion including its name", denouncing the shortened name and "any inappropriate contraction or misuse of its name" as "offensive and derogatory to the community". The resolution was reposted on Facebook in February 2023 by barangay captain Benhur Cruz. The post drew mixed reactions online, with some Filipinos in support of the resolution, while others finding the resolution to be outlandish.

== Divisions ==
A drone shot of Poblacion, Makati (2025)

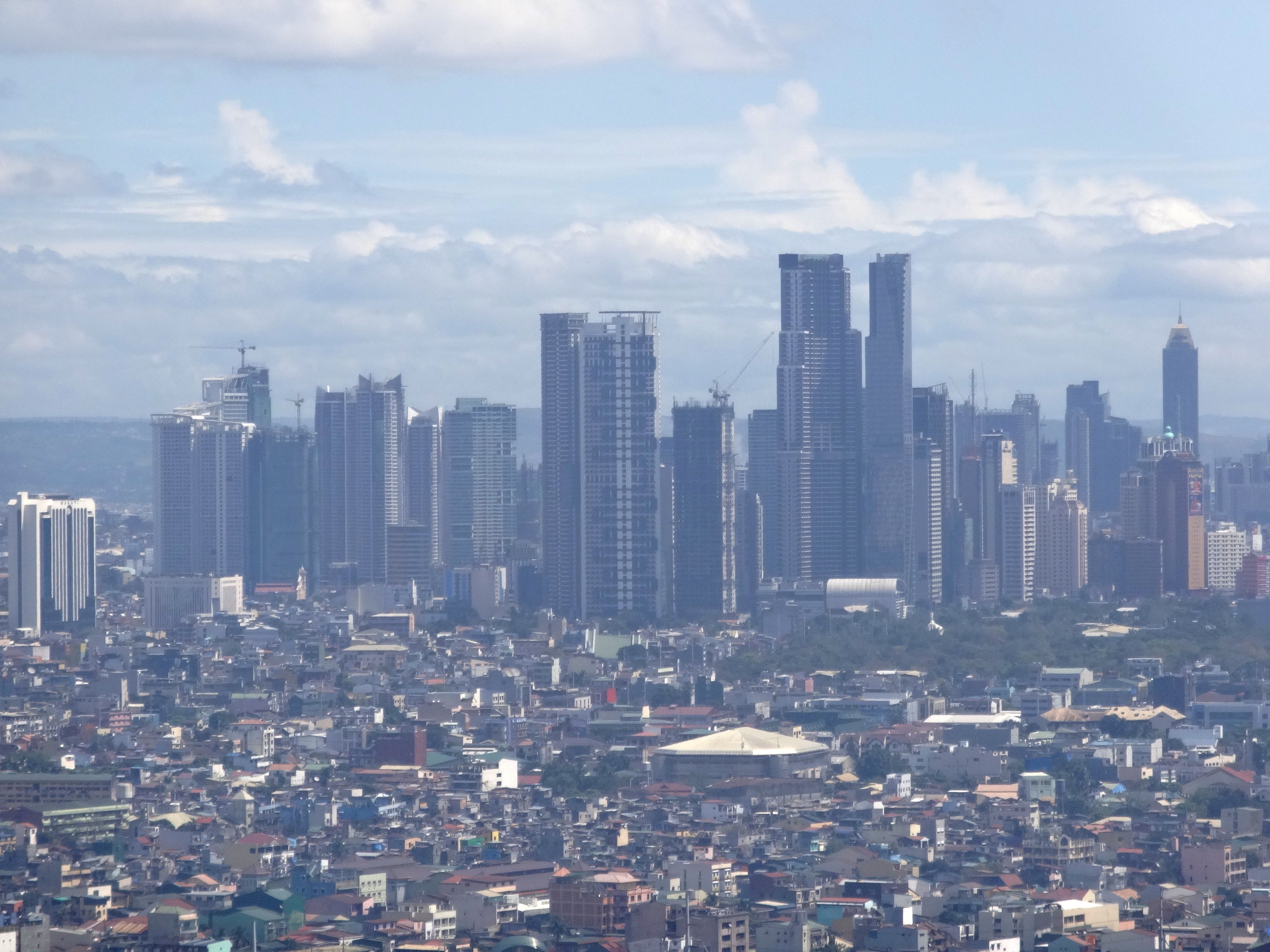
Poblacion Makati Skyline

Gramercy Residences located along Kalayaan Avenue.

Century City is a mixed-used development along Kalayaan Avenue. Century Properties bought and developed the lot formerly occupied by the International School Manila. The Gramercy Residences, the Philippines' tallest residential building, as well as the Knightsbridge Residences are situated in this area. Recently, Centuria Medical Makati also opened within the community. The Century City Mall serves as the area's prime lifestyle center.

Makati City Hall Complex is located along the one-way J.P. Rizal Avenue within the poblacion. The complex houses the 22-storey Makati City Hall, the Old City Hall, the Makati Regional Trial Court, the controversial Makati City Hall Building II, Pio del Pilar National High School, and the Makati City Pumping Station situated along the Pasig River. It is located within the eastern part of Rizal Village, which the barangay shares with the adjacent Barangay Valenzuela.

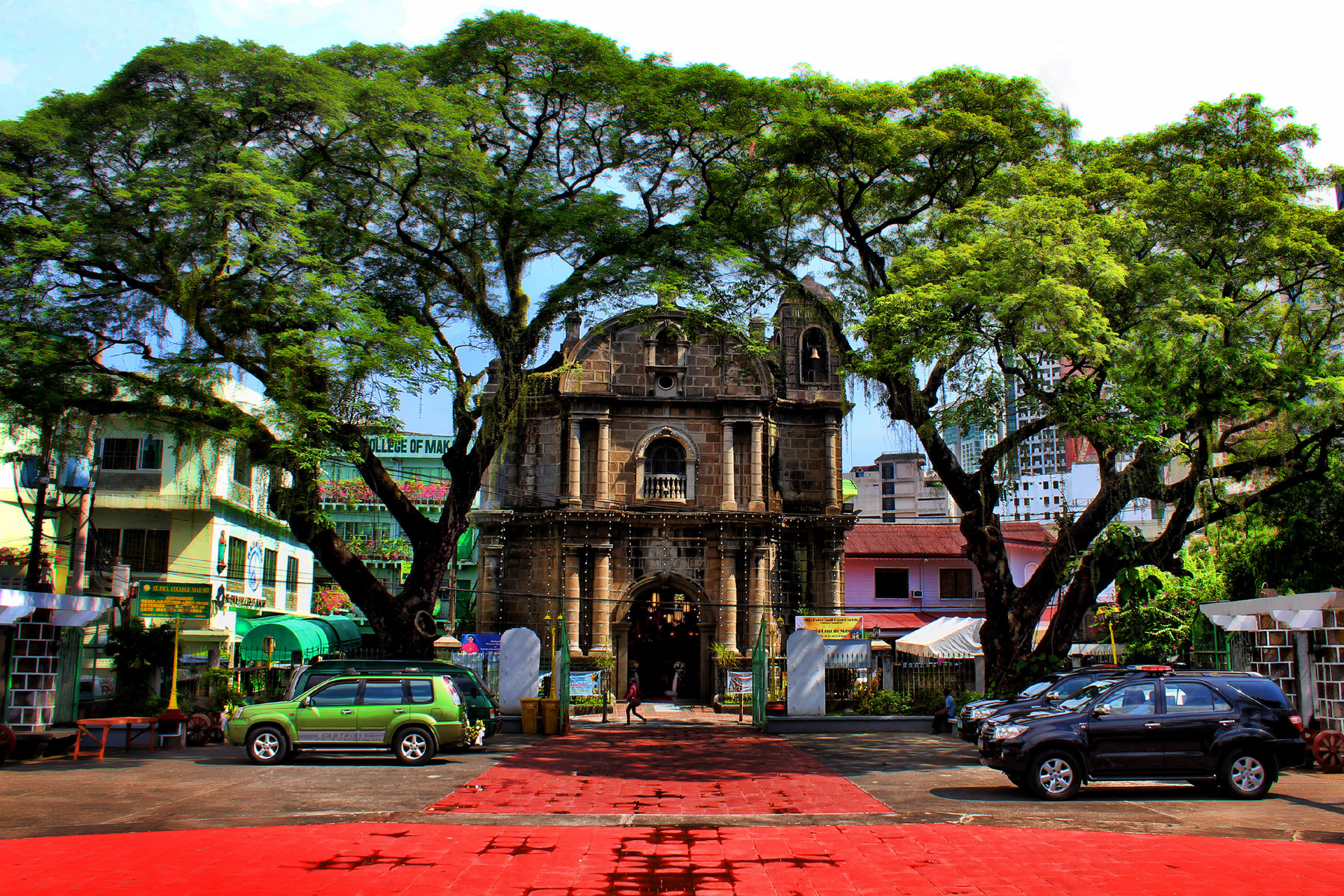
Saints Peter and Paul Parish Church

Makati Heritage District is a heritage area bounded by the streets of J.P. Rizal, P. Burgos, R. Palma and Kalayaan Avenue. The Museo ng Makati, which was built in 1918 and has been used as Makati's town hall from 1918 to 1961, is situated in the poblacion along J.P. Rizal Avenue. The Saints Peter and Paul Parish Church, Poblacion River Park, Makati Science High School, Makati City High School and Makati City Public Market are situated in this district.

Makati Commercial District is a commercial area bounded by the streets of Polaris, P. Burgos and Makati Avenue. It is known as the entertainment district of Makati, which restaurants, night clubs and boutique hotels in the city are mostly located in this area. On the west portion of the area, the Antel Lifestyle City, which houses the A. Venue Event Mall, is located.

Picar Place is an upcoming mixed-use development by Picar Development located west of Century City which will contain one of the city's tallest buildings at 312 meters (1,024 ft), The Stratford Residences now under construction along Kalayaan Avenue. The area was the location of the now defunct Buddha Bar Manila.

Rockwell Center was constructed on a 15.5-hectare (38-acre) lot previously used as a thermal power plant operated by the Lopez-owned Manila Electric Railroad and Light Company until its closure in 1994. The project was named after James Rockwell, the Meralco's first president. The lot is bounded by J.P. Rizal Avenue to the north, where it faces the Pasig River, Estrella Street to the east, Rockwell Drive and Amapola Street to the south, and R. Palma Street to the west. Rockwell Center began its construction in 1998. The architectural firm Skidmore, Owings, Merril (SOM) carried out the design under the direction of former Design Partner Larry Oltmanns. Its centerpiece, the Power Plant Mall, opened in December 2000. The Rockwell Center includes high-rise office buildings, condominium towers, a law and business school and a shopping mall. Among the plans for the area is the Lopez Centre, proposed to have a height of over 1000 feet, which would make it the country's tallest building. This design been abandoned in favor of a 19-storey building that will house the Lopez family holdings offices and museum.

San Miguel Village is a residential subdivision developed by Ayala Corporation along J.P. Rizal Avenue and Kalayaan Avenue. It is one of the first subdivisions developed by Ayala in Makati.

== Gallery ==
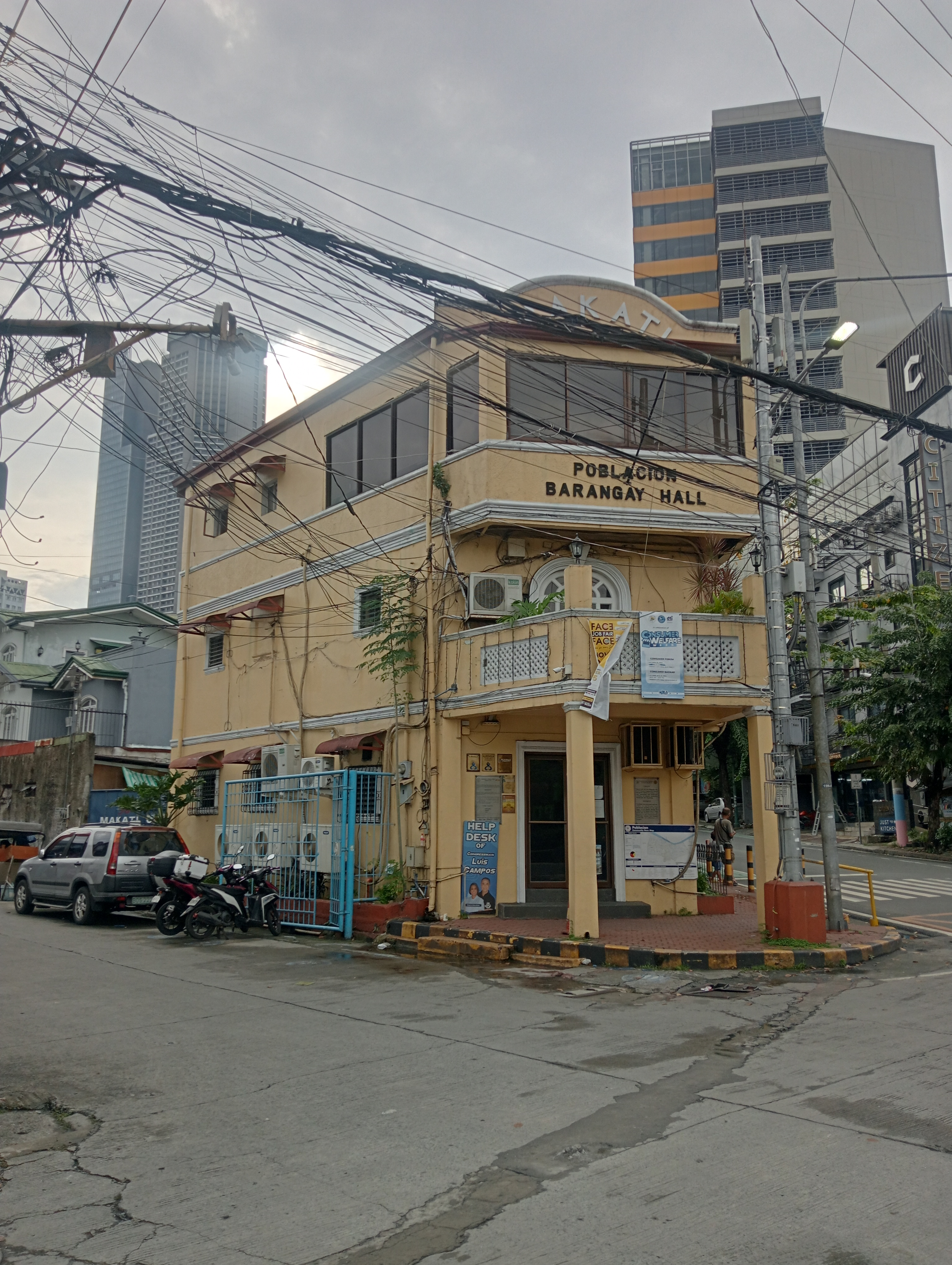
Poblacion Barangay Hall

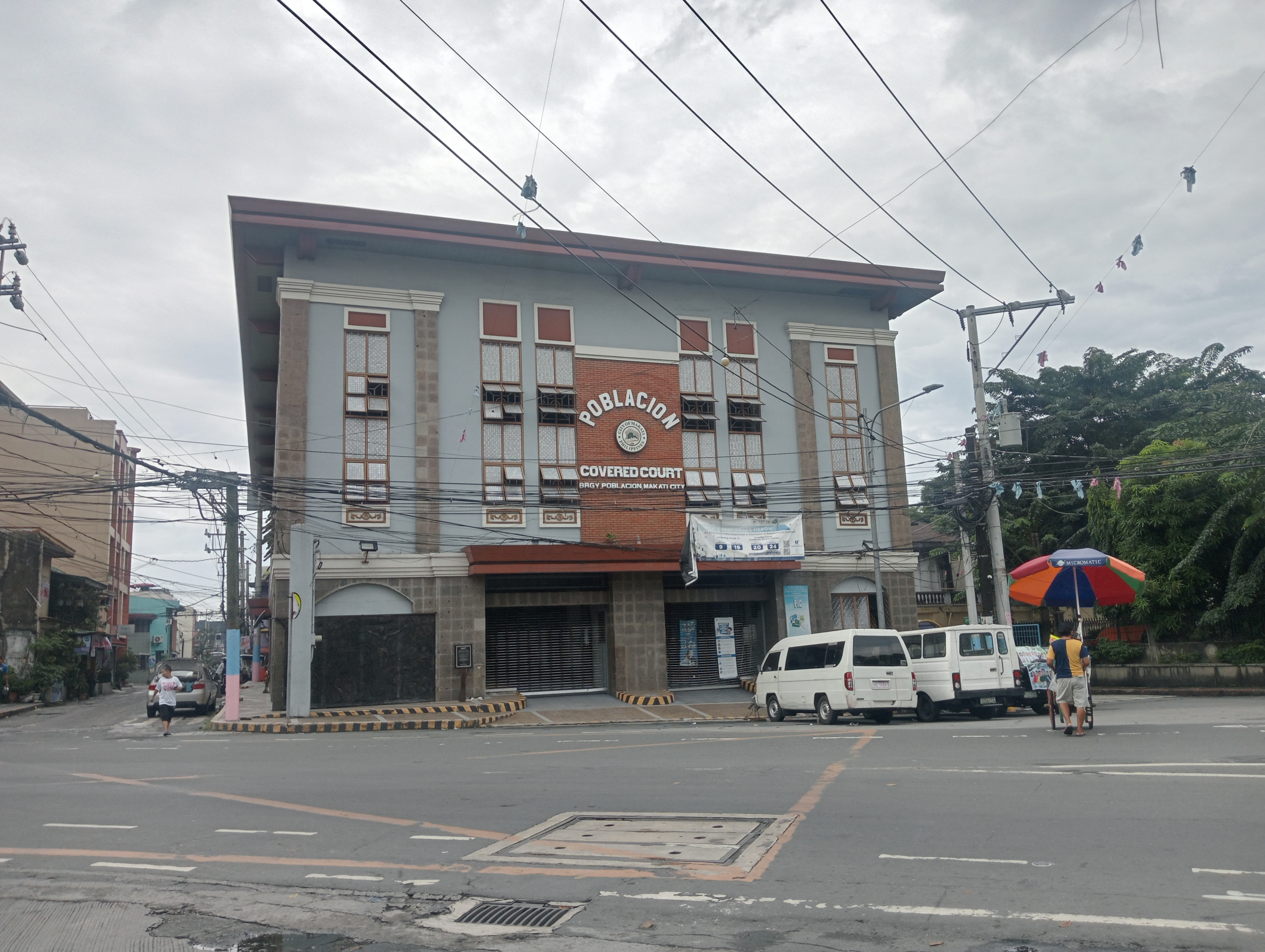
Poblacion Covered Court

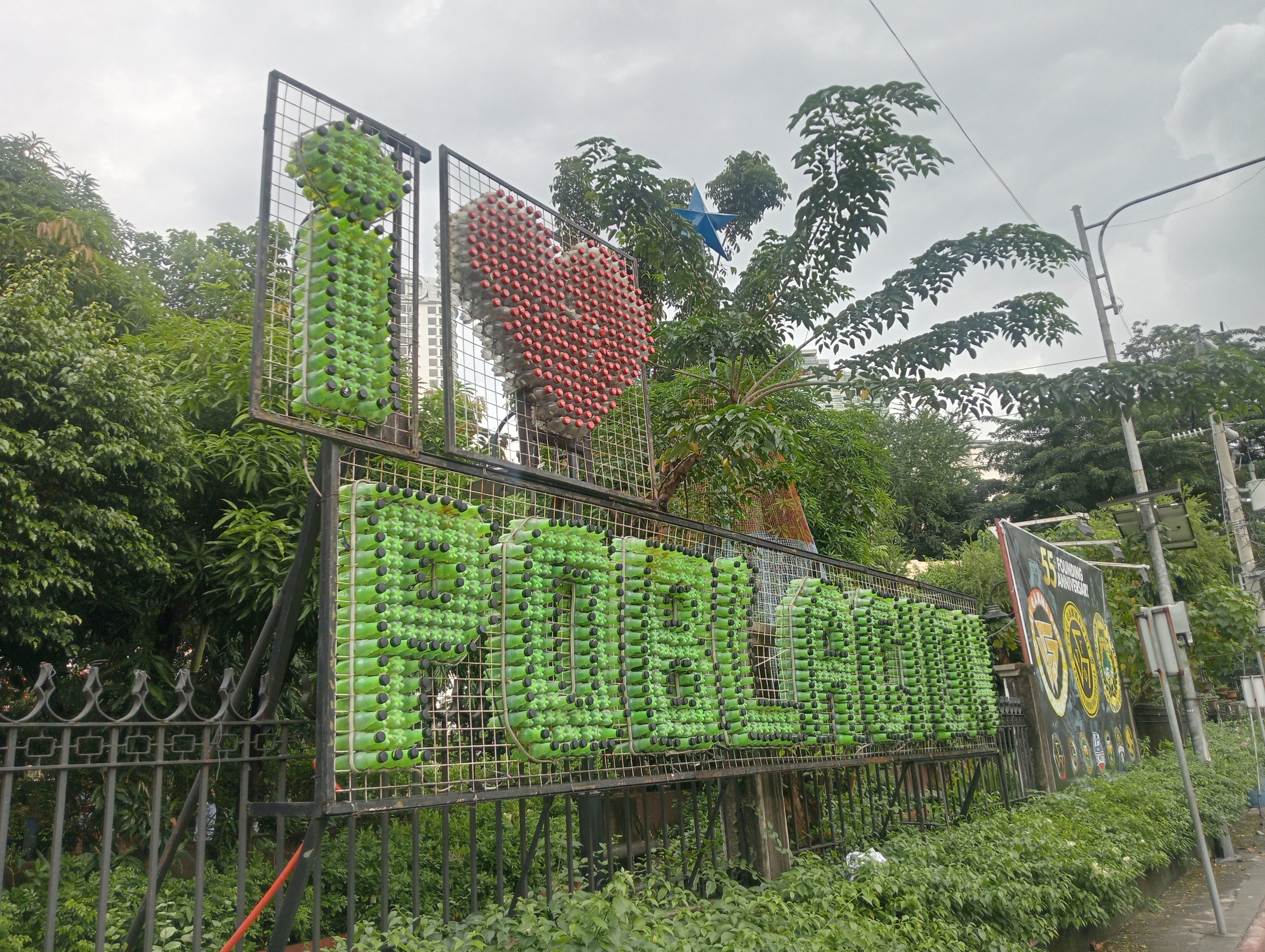
I Love Poblacion Marker

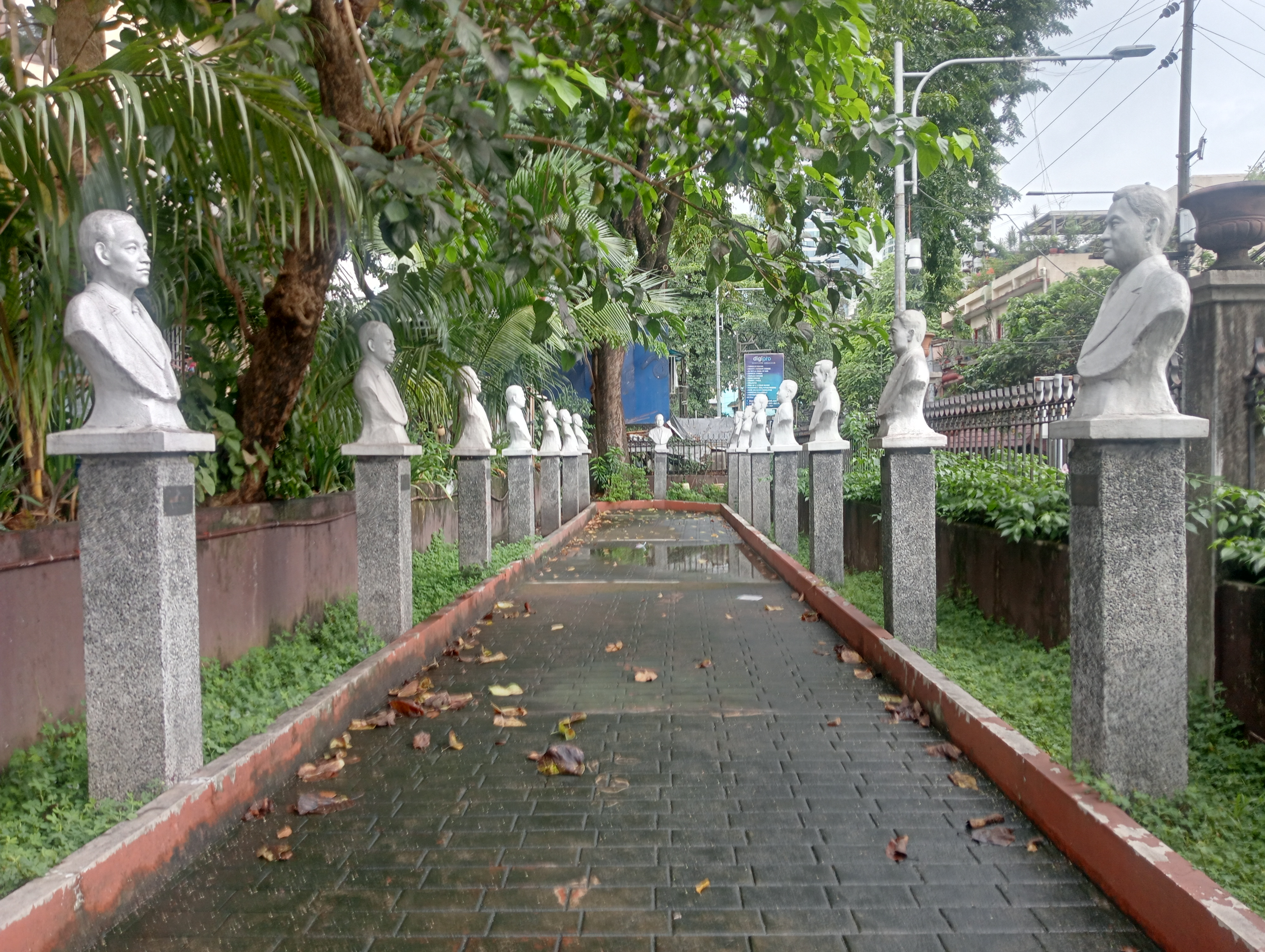
Makati Mayors Lane
