= Century City Mall =

Shopping mall in Century City, Poblacion, Makati

- Façade of the mall from Kalayaan Avenue
- Location: Kalayaan Avenue corner Salamanca Street, Century City, Poblacion
- Coordinates: 14°33′56″N 121°01′39″E
- Address: Makati, Metro Manila, Philippines
- Opened: February 17, 2014; 12 years ago
- Developer: Century City Development Corporation
- Owner: Century Properties
- Num. of stores: 100+
- Floor area: 17,000 square meters (180,000 sq ft)
- Floors: 5 upper + 4 basement
- Parking: 527 (2014)
- Website: centurycitymall.com.ph

Century City Mall is a shopping mall within the Century City complex in Poblacion, Makati, Metro Manila, Philippines.

== History ==
The mall was under construction in 2013 and the opening of the mall was initially planned in the fourth quarter of 2013. By July 2013, painting works for the mall's interior and exterior including its roof were effectively complete with some finishing touches to be done. The elevators were installed and functional and tiles were installed in common areas of the mall. In June, the lease spaces were turned over for tenants for fit-out works and completed fit-out works and finishing by January 2014. During this period, the mall was ready to open with only cleaning work remaining. The mall's generator sets and CCTVs were tested during the period.

Century City Mall opened on February 17, 2014.

== Architecture ==
Heat is minimized by the architectural design of the mall. The exterior of the Century City Mall was painted white to minimize the heat absorbed by the walls and roof and the Exterior Insulation Finishing System is used as the façade material to minimize absorption of heat by the mall's units, which in turn reduces the energy needed by the air conditioning. For the glassworks, tinted horizontal glass sheets were installed to reflect sunlight and minimize the heat entering the building as part of the designer's efforts to improve comfort to people inside the mall.

On the mall's roof garden situated on the fourth floor, natural ventilation and vegetation were installed to reduce temperature and filter the air inside the building. Through a series of sky lights, natural light that passes inside the mall are filtered through all levels. In order to minimize water consumption, waterless urinals are installed inside the mall's restrooms.

== Facilities ==
There are two entrances, one located along Kalayaan Avenue and another on the corner of General Luna Street and Kalayaan Loop Road. The mall also has four digital cinemas. The mall project costed around ₱1 billion. Three basement floors are allotted for parking space for around 527 vehicles. The mall has five floors above ground and one basement level mainly for retail space and has 49,143 square meters (528,970 sq ft) of gross floor area. Century City Development Corporation, a part of Century Properties Group was the mall's developer. Located at the fifth floor is the San Padre Pio Da Pietrelcina Chapel, a Roman Catholic chapel.

=== Tenants ===
The mall has 17,000 square meters (180,000 sq ft) of net leasable space and by the first day of the mall's operation, more than 100 tenants has leased out the space including The Marketplace supermarket at Basement 1. The mall hosts both local and international shops. The Century Properties Group said that the mall would primarily serve occupants of the Gramercy Residences and the Knightsbridge Residences, as well as residents of nearby barangays and offices in Makati.
