= Makati Avenue =

Thoroughfare in Makati, Philippines

Coordinates: 14°33′31″N 121°1′35″E

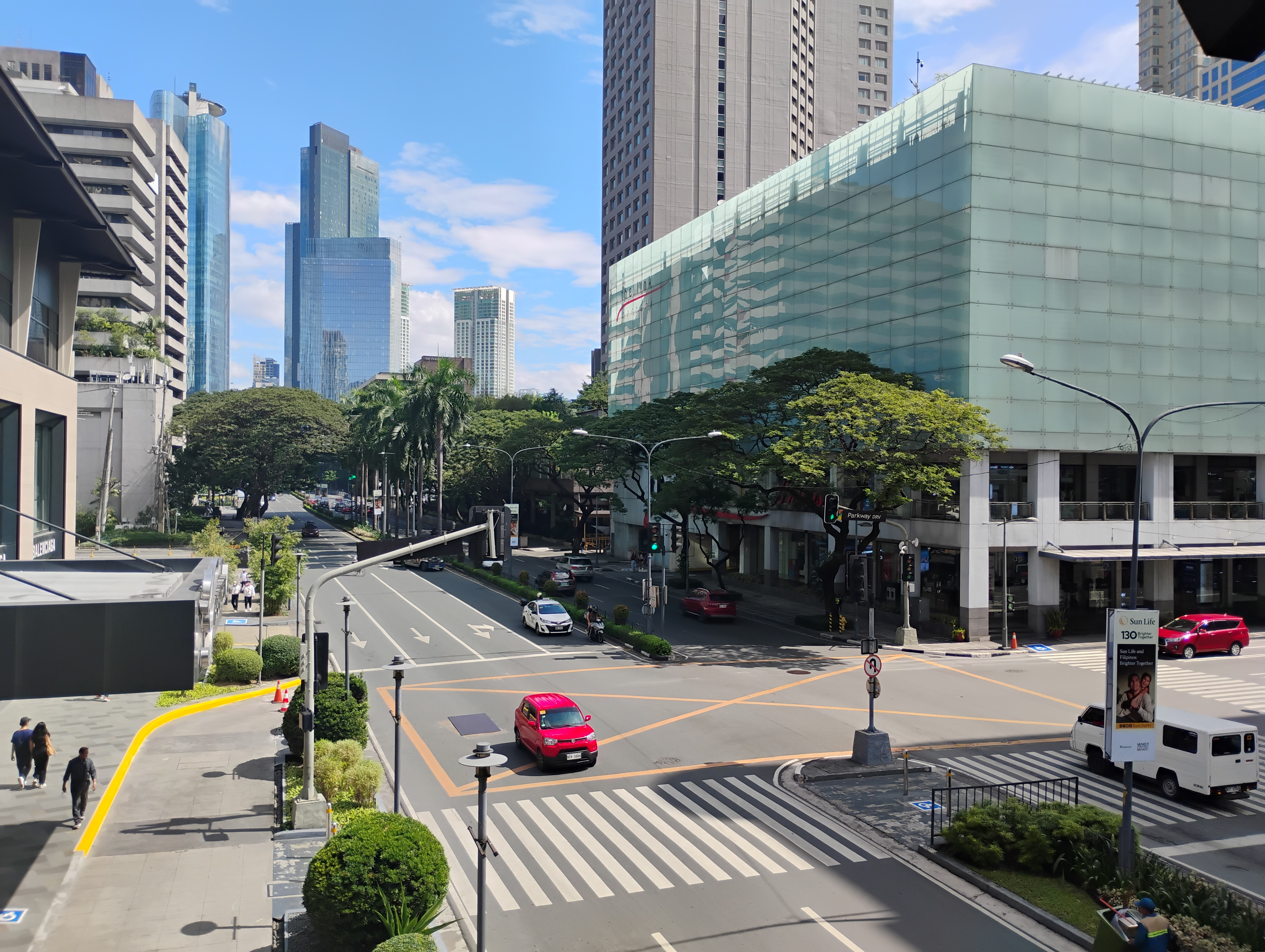
- Makati Avenue as seen from the Landmark-Greenbelt Pedestrian Overpass
- Interactive map of Makati Avenue
- Former name: Culi-Culi Road
- Maintained by: Department of Public Works and Highways (Note: DPWH maintenance only covers Makati Avenue's segment between J.P. Rizal Avenue and Gil Puyat Avenue.)
- Length: 2.1 km (1.3 mi)
- Location: Makati, Metro Manila
- North end: J.P. Rizal Avenue and P. Burgos Street in Poblacion
- Major junctions: Kalayaan Avenue; Gil Puyat Avenue; Paseo de Roxas; Ayala Avenue
- South end: Arnaiz Avenue in San Lorenzo

Makati Avenue (Filipino: Abenida Makati) is a major commercial thoroughfare in Makati, Metro Manila, Philippines. It forms the eastern border of the Ayala Triangle and is one of the three main avenues of the Makati Central Business District. The avenue runs roughly north–south diagonally, almost parallel to Epifanio de los Santos Avenue (EDSA). It passes through two distinct neighborhoods of the city: the Makati CBD and the old Makati Población. At its northern end lies the older part of Makati, starting from J.P. Rizal Avenue. It continues through Población to Gil Puyat Avenue, marking the southern edge of the old district. South of Gil Puyat onto the CBD, the avenue becomes more commercial and upscale. The Ayala Center shopping hub and Arnaiz Avenue are at its southern end.

Makati Avenue has two lanes each way in the Poblacion area and widens to three or four in the CBD. It has a short extension into the gated San Lorenzo Village as San Lorenzo Drive.

== Route description ==
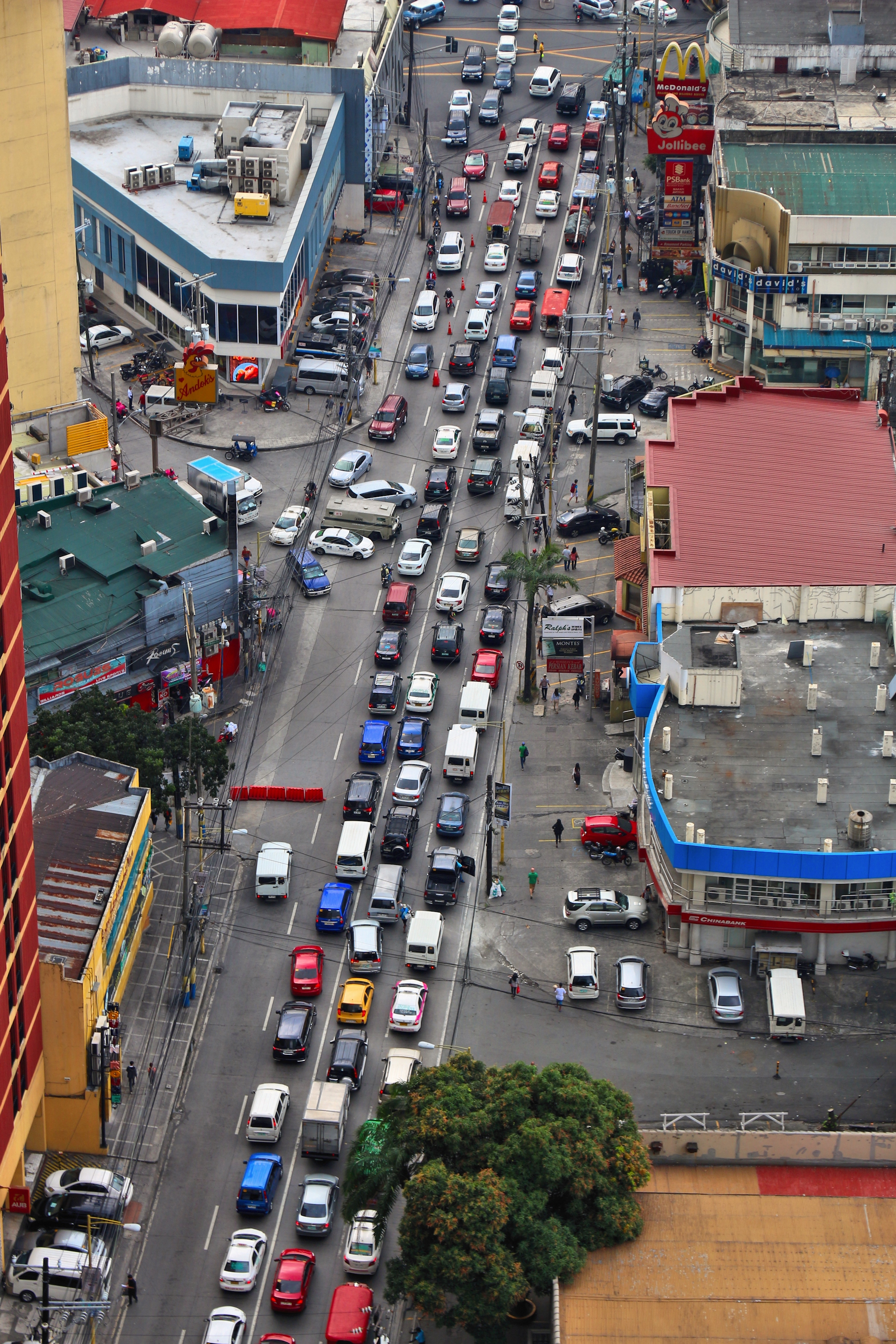
Traffic congestion along Makati Avenue, facing south, in 2017

Makati Avenue begins as a dual carriageway at the intersection of Arnaiz Avenue and San Lorenzo Drive in Barangay San Lorenzo. Between its southern terminus to Ayala Avenue, it passes through the Greenbelt and Glorietta complexes of the Ayala Center, then enters Legaspi Village, Ayala Triangle Gardens, and Salcedo Village. North of its intersection with Ayala Avenue, the western part of the avenue is under the jurisdiction of Barangay Bel-Air, while Barangay Urdaneta is at the eastern part of the avenue.

After its intersection with Paseo de Roxas and Gil Puyat Avenue, where its maintenance by the Department of Public Works and Highways (DPWH) begins, the eastern part of the avenue enters Bel-Air until it passes Jupiter Street, where it narrows into a four-lane single carriageway. Makati Avenue enters Poblacion at its intersection with Anza Street. It passes much of Poblacion between Kalayaan Avenue and J.P. Rizal Avenue. It terminates at J.P. Rizal Avenue and continues to the Makati–Mandaluyong Bridge and Poblacion as P. Burgos Street, where its maintenance by the DPWH continues.

== History ==
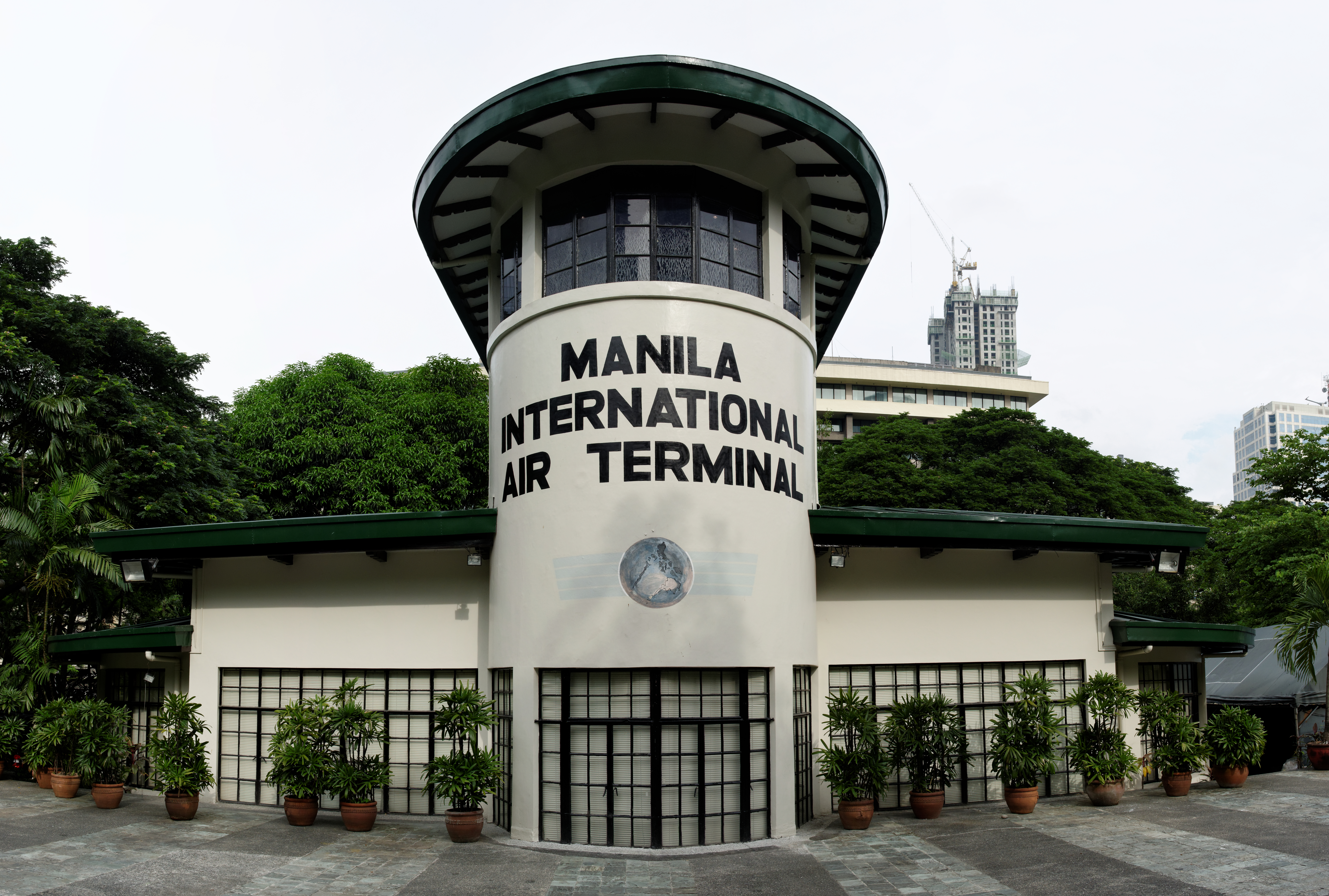
Old Nielson Tower on Ayala Triangle, Makati Avenue

The avenue traces its roots to the primary access road connecting the old Nielson Field airport and the San Pedro de Macati town proper, extending up to the Manila Circumferential Road (now EDSA) at the present-day location of the Magallanes Interchange at the south. It was known as Culi-Culi Road, which also led to barrio Culi-Culi (now Pio del Pilar) just west of Nielson Field. After the airport was closed down after World War II, its two runways were converted into wide roads known today as Ayala Avenue and Paseo de Roxas. The airport's control tower was preserved, and is now a library called Filipinas Heritage Library. This library is located along the avenue at the southeast corner of Ayala Triangle. The subsequent development of San Lorenzo Village led to the road's section between Manila Circumferential Road and McKinley–Pasay Road (now divided into Arnaiz Avenue and McKinley Road) being removed.

Makati Avenue, particularly its northern segment in Poblacion, has a history of prostitution. The areas around P. Burgos Street, with its nightclubs, bars, and budget hotels, are considered by many to be Makati's red-light district. At present, however, the area is undergoing gentrification with the completion of several new commercial developments, including the Century City mall and complex.

== Intersections ==
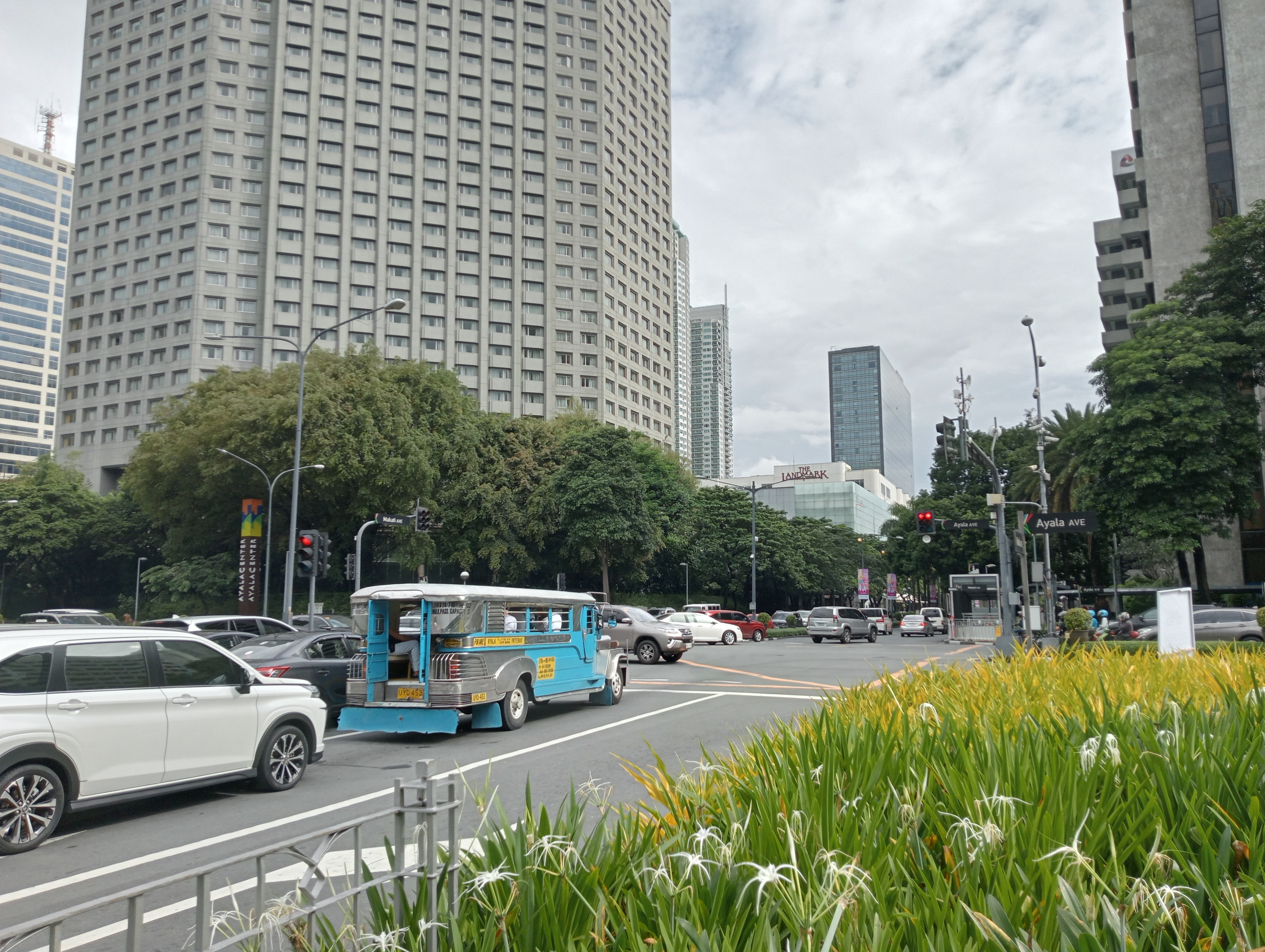
Intersection of Makati and Ayala Avenues

The entire route is located in Makati.

| km | mi | Destinations | Notes |
|---|---|---|---|
| | | Arnaiz Avenue | Southern terminus. Traffic light intersection. Continues south into San Lorenzo Village as San Lorenzo Drive. |
| | | Esperanza Street | Entrance only to Makati Avenue southbound |
| | | Palm Drive | Traffic light intersection. Access to Glorietta and Greenbelt complexes. |
| | | Parkway Drive | Traffic light intersection. Access to Glorietta complex. |
| | | De la Rosa Street | Southbound access to Legazpi Village |
| | | Ayala Avenue | Traffic light intersection |
| | | Santo Tomas Street | Access to Urdaneta Village and The Peninsula Manila |
| | | Paseo de Roxas | Traffic light intersection |
| | | H.V. De la Costa Street | Traffic light intersection on the southbound side. Southbound access to Salcedo Village. |
| | | Buendia Extension Access Road | Southbound access only towards Gil Puyat Avenue eastbound |
| | | Cruzada Street | Northbound access only |
| | | N190 (Gil Puyat Avenue) | Traffic light intersection. South end of DPWH maintenance. |
| | | Jupiter Street | No left turn allowed from both northbound and southbound. Access to Bel-Air Village. |
| | | Juno Street | Restricted access to Bel-Air Village. |
| | | Anza Street | |
| | | P. Burgos Street | Exit from Makati Avenue only. Access to the Red Light District and the old Makati Población |
| | | Hercules Street | Restricted access to Bel-Air Village. |
| | | Tigris Street | |
| | | Constellation Street | Restricted access to Bel-Air Village. |
| | | Neptune Street, Durban Street | Both entrance to Makati Avenue only |
| | | Kalayaan Avenue | Traffic light intersection |
| | | Eduque Street | |
| | | General Luna Street | No left turn allowed from southbound and no right turn from northbound. Access to Century City. |
| | | Guerrero Street | |
| | | Guanzon Street | |
| | | B. Valdez Street | No right turn allowed from southbound and no left turn from northbound. Access to Sts. Peter and Paul Parish Church and Saint Paul College of Makati. |
| | | Singian Street | Unsignaled intersection |
| | | P. Burgos Street | Northbound entrance only to Makati Avenue |
| | | J.P. Rizal Avenue | Northern terminus; continues north towards Makati–Mandaluyong Bridge as P. Burgos Street. Traffic light intersection. |
1.000 mi = 1.609 km; 1.000 km = 0.621 mi: Closed/former; Incomplete access

== Points of interest ==
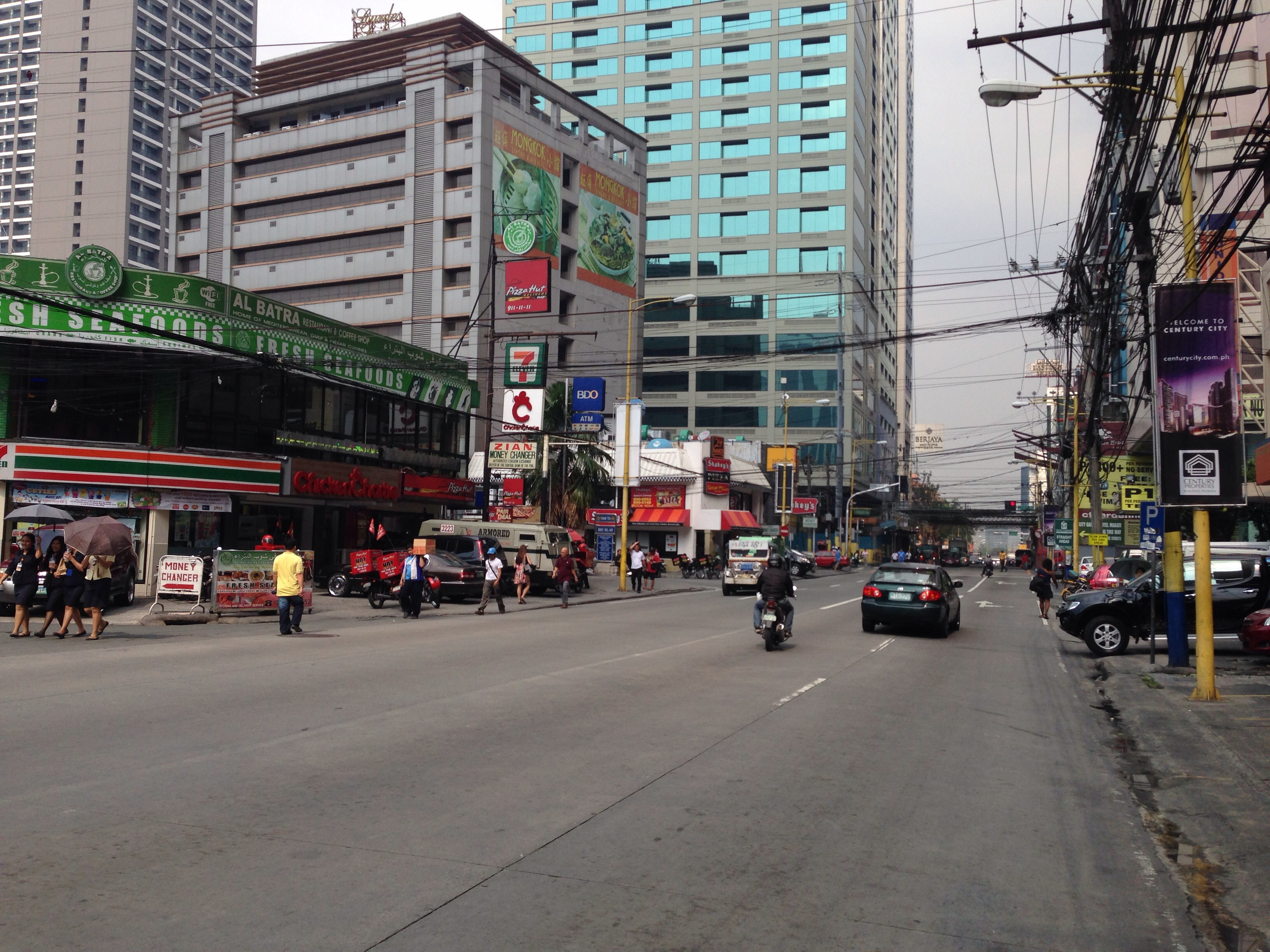
Makati's Poblacion at Makati and Kalayaan Avenues

Makati Avenue is a retail and entertainment hub of Makati. At its south end, the avenue bisects the Ayala Center, separating Glorietta, The Landmark department store and The Link shopping mall from the more upscale Greenbelt shopping center. This section also hosts the Ayala Museum, Greenbelt Chapel, and several luxury hotels such as the Makati Shangri-La, Manila, Fairmont Hotel Manila, Raffles Hotel Manila, and New World Makati Hotel. The stretch from Ayala Avenue to Gil Puyat Avenue is the site of the Ayala Triangle Gardens, which houses the Old Nielson Tower and the Park Central Towers. This section also hosts The Peninsula Manila, Zuellig Building, Pacific Star Building, and several other office buildings.

North of Gil Puyat are more hotels and commercial establishments, particularly near the intersection with Kalayaan Avenue. The A. Venue Mall and Century City Mall are located in this area, as are Gramercy Residences, Trump Tower Manila, Berjaya Makati Hotel, I'M Hotel Makati, St. Giles Hotel and Best Western Antel. The Sts. Peter and Paul Parish Church and Saint Paul College of Makati can be accessed by turning east onto Valdez Street before reaching J.P. Rizal Avenue and the Makati–Mandaluyong Bridge.

== Events ==
Since September 2023, the section of Makati Avenue between Ayala Avenue and Paseo de Roxas, as well as portions of the aforementioned roads, is closed to traffic every Sunday from 6:00 am to 10:00 am PHT. Branded as Car-Free Sundays, the car-free day initiative was launched by Ayala Land and the Makati City Government to promote cycling, jogging, and other recreational activities in a safer and more pedestrian-friendly environment.

A portion of the avenue near Ayala Avenue was also closed when the latter became the main venue of New Year's Eve celebrations beginning in 1999 and of Vice President Leni Robredo's final campaign rally (miting de avance) for her 2022 presidential campaign.

From June 21 to 22, 2025, the section of Makati Avenue between J.P. Rizal and Kalayaan was closed for the city's Pride Month celebration.
