= The Knightsbridge Residences =

- Interactive map of the The Knightsbridge Residences area

General information
- Status: Completed
- Type: Residential
- Location: Kalayaan Avenue, Century City, Makati, Philippines
- Construction started: 16 January 2009
- Completed: 2014
- Cost: PHP 4.7 billion
- Owner: Century Properties Inc.
- Management: Century Property Management Corp.

Height
- Roof: 210 m (689.0 ft)

Technical details
- Floor count: 60 aboveground, 4 belowground

Design and construction
- Architect: ASYA Design Partners
- Developer: Century City Development Corp.
- Structural engineer: Aromin & Sy + Associates

The Knightsbridge Residences, also known as The Knightsbridge Residences @ Century City, is a high-end residential skyscraper constructed in Makati, Philippines. It is the second of several buildings built in the Century City development along Kalayaan Avenue. It is one of the Philippines' tallest buildings. The Knightsbridge Residences takes its name after the Knightsbridge neighborhood in London.

== Location ==
The Knightsbridge Residences is located within the former location of the 4.8-hectare International School Manila, which 3.4 hectares was sold to Century Properties (the remaining was sold to Picar Properties) in a bidding by the Philippine government in 2007. Situated along Kalayaan Avenue, it is just a block away from the busy entertainment area along Makati Avenue. It is also about a few blocks away from the Makati Central Business District, the capital’s financial hub, and about 30 minutes from the Ninoy Aquino International Airport.

== Design and construction ==
The Knightsbridge Residences was part of the masterplan made by California-based architectural group Jerde Partnership International, and was designed by Philippine architectural firm ASYA Design Partners. Structural design and engineering is provided by renowned Filipino structural engineering firm Aromin & Sy + Associates.

Project and construction management is being handled by local firm Nova Construction + Development. The lobby and common areas of the building, particularly The Podium Level amenity floor will be designed by Hong Kong–based International Leisure Consultants (ILC).

== Architecture ==
The building introduced the Lantern concept, a unique architectural featuring stacked special residential units with dramatic floor-to-ceiling windows that create iconic, sparkling glass boxes. This is a distinguishing feature which can easily be seen around the city, especially at night.

The building has a maximum of 20 units per floor, each with a floor to ceiling clearance of 2.7 meters, and has 300 parking slots available in 4 basement floors.

== See also ==
- List of tallest buildings in the Philippines
- The Gramercy Residences
- Trump Tower Manila
- Milano Residences
- Century Spire
