= Milano Residences =

- Interactive map of the Milano Residences area
- Alternative names: The Milano Residences

General information
- Status: Completed
- Type: Residential
- Location: Century City, Makati, Philippines
- Coordinates: 14.5616°N 121.0496°E
- Construction started: 2011
- Completed: 2016
- Cost: ₱3 billion
- Owner: Century Properties Group

Height
- Height: 196 m (643 ft)

Technical details
- Floor count: 53

Design and construction
- Architecture firm: Broadway Malyan
- Developer: Milano Development Corporation

Website
- www.milanoresidences.com.ph

Milano Residences, also known as The Milano Residences, is a residential high-rise condominium in Makati, Philippines. As of 2017, it is the 17th-tallest building in the Philippines. It is the first of several buildings built at the Century City complex along Kalayaan Avenue by Century Properties.

== Location ==
The Milano Residences is located within the former location of the 4.8-hectare International School Manila, wherein 3.4 hectares was sold to Century Properties Corporation, while the remaining 1.4 hectares were sold to Picar Properties, in a bidding by the Philippine Government in December 2006. Situated along Kalayaan Avenue, it is just a block away from the busy entertainment area along Makati Avenue. It is also about a few blocks away from the Makati Central Business District.

== Architecture ==
The Milano Residences features a design concept replicating Greek Fret, designed by world-renowned architectural firm Broadway Malyan. Its interior was designed by the Italian based Versace. Thus, the building also features some Italian-inspired interior designs in both its units and its amenities. It has 340 apartment units.

== Milano Piazza ==
Milano Piazza is an outdoor center for residents of Milano Residences. It is a relaxing open space with lush landscaping, fascinating water features and stylish lounge areas.
