= CPMI =

CPMI may refer to:

- Center for Plasma-Material Interactions
- Centre for Particle and Material Interfaces
- Century Properties Management, Inc.
- Chicago Purchasing Managers' Index
- Command Personnel Management Inspections
- Committee on Payments and Market Infrastructures
- Corporate Performance Management Information
