= Century City, Makati =

Mixed-use development in Philippines

Coordinates: 14°33′58″N 121°01′40″E

Century City
- Century City with surrounding buildings

Project
- Opening date: 2013
- Developer: Century Properties
- Operator: Century Properties Management, Inc.
- Owner: Century Properties
- Website: Century City

Location
- Interactive map of Century City, Makati
- Country: Philippines
- Region: Metro Manila
- Municipality: Makati
- Barangay: Poblacion

Century City is a 3.4-hectare (8.4-acre) mixed-use development in Makati, Philippines being developed by Century Properties. Several of the Philippines' upscale and tallest buildings are located here, as well as a 17,000-square-meter (180,000 ft^{2}) mall.

The land the development sits on was the former site of International School Manila. It was purchased in 2006 by a consortium composed of Century Properties Inc. and Picar Holdings. Construction of the development began in 2007.

== Location ==
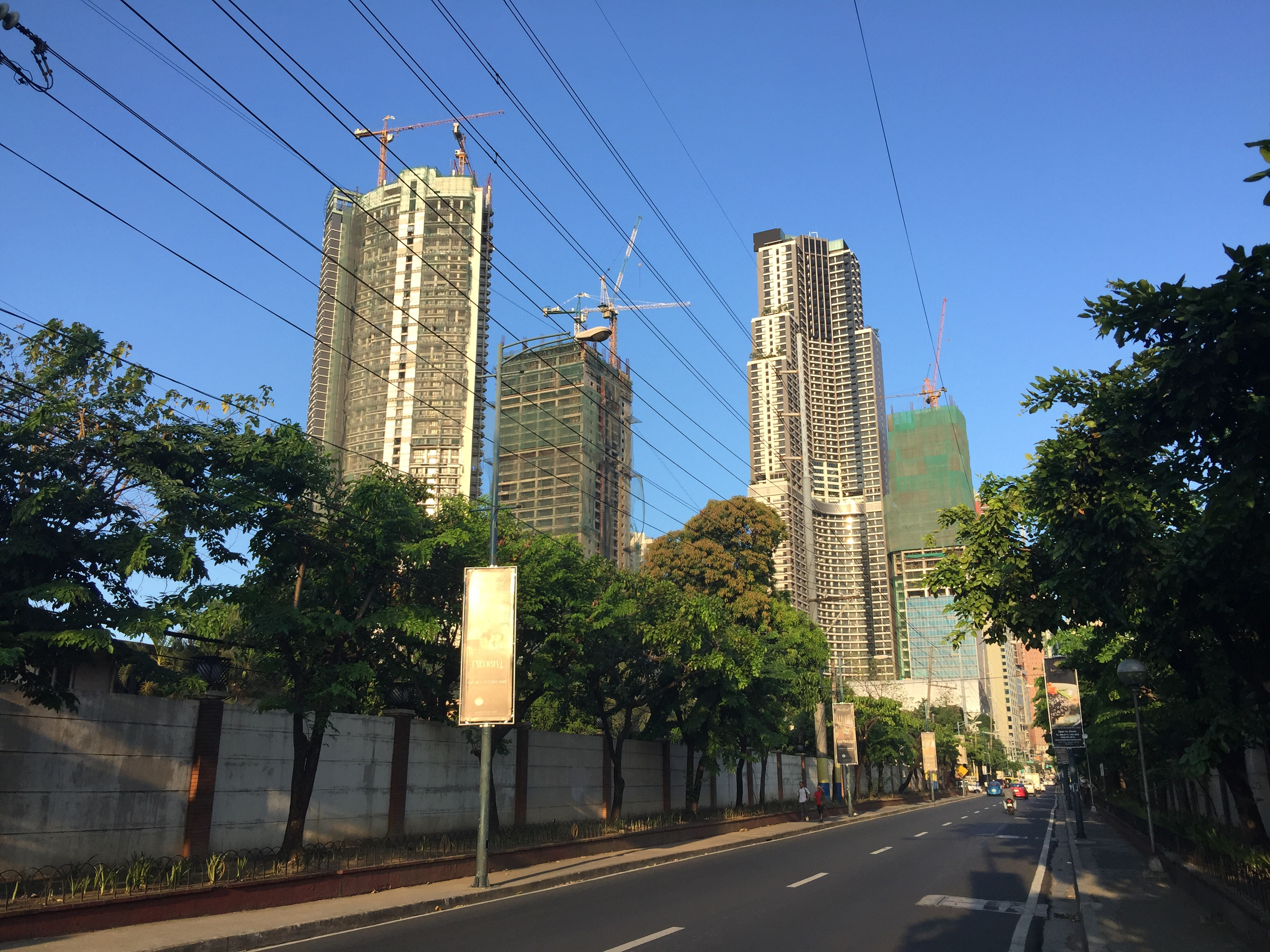
Century City in 2015

Century City is located on a 4.8-hectare (12-acre) site at Kalayaan Avenue formerly occupied by the International School Manila for over 40 years. It occupies a significant portion of the old downtown area of Makati being redeveloped along Makati Avenue just north of the Makati Central Business District. It lies between Valdez Street and Kalayaan Avenue to the north and south, and between Salamanca Street and Spring Street to the east and west. It is also a few blocks away from Rockwell Center and is about 0.4 kilometers (0.25 mi) south of Mandaluyong and the Pasig River.

== Century City Mall ==
Century City Mall on Kalayaan Avenue

Century City Mall is the retail anchor for the Century City complex. It is a boutique mall and lifestyle center which has 17,000 square meters (180,000 sq ft) of leasable space for around 100 tenants. It is anchored by The Marketplace supermarket and a four-screen digital cinema. The five-level shopping mall also contains several restaurants and bars, including the 12 Monkeys Music Hall and Pub located on the mall's rooftop. It was completed in 2014.

== Centuria Medical ==
The Centuria Medical Makati, completed in 2017, is a hospital featuring IT-based facilities and amenities, and is managed and operated in a joint-venture partnership with Centuria Medical. The Centuria Medical is a stand-alone, out-patient surgical facility that caters to the needs of specialties such as Plastic Reconstructive and Aesthetic/Cosmetic Surgery, Dermatology, ENT-HNS, Gastroenterology, OB-GYN, Ophthalmology, Orthopedics and Urology, housing over 500 highly skilled and board certified doctors from different medical practices.

== Residential and office projects ==
Residential buildings

- The Gramercy Residences
- Trump Tower Manila
- The Knightsbridge Residences
- Milano Residences
- Century Spire

Office buildings

- Century Diamond Tower (formerly Forbes Media Tower) - a ₱5 Billion office building, in collaboration with Forbes and the Mitsubishi Corporation. The building was completed in 2021.
