= Saint Pedro Poveda College =

Roman Catholic college in Quezon City, Philippines

Location
- P. Poveda Road corner EDSA, Ortigas Center, Brgy. Ugong Norte, Quezon City; Philippines; 14°35′25.79″N 121°3′29.73″E

Information
- Former names: Institución Teresiana (1960–1974); Poveda Learning Centre (1974–2005)
- Type: Private, Roman Catholic research non-profit, Basic and Higher education institution
- Motto: Deus Scientiarum Dominus (Latin); God, the Lord of Sciences (English)
- Religious affiliation: Roman Catholic
- Established: 1960
- President: Ms. Rosalinda Y. Basas
- Patron: Pedro Poveda Castroverde
- Enrollment: 3,000
- Language: English, Spanish, Filipino
- Campus: Urban
- Colors: Yellow and Black
- Mascot: The Golden Phoenix
- Nickname: Povedans
- Publication: Grade School – Gazette; High School – Blazon; Tertiary – Prism; Yearbook – The Povedan
- Website: www.poveda.edu.ph

Saint Pedro Poveda College (more commonly known as Poveda, formerly known as the Poveda Learning Centre and Institución Teresiana) is a private, Roman Catholic exclusive school for girls in the heart of Metro Manila's Ortigas Business District, Quezon City, Philippines. It is run by the Teresian Association of Lay Missionaries, which was founded in Spain.

The alumnae and present students of this school include daughters and granddaughters of Filipino presidents, industrialists, politicians, businessmen, and prominent figures in Philippine society.

Founded in 1960 as Institución Teresiana, the school was inaugurated by Maria del Carmen Franco de Martinez-Bordiu, the Marquesa de Villaverde and only daughter of Generalissimo Francisco Franco of Spain. It conducts classes in three languages: English, Spanish, and Filipino.

The school's regular program from Grade 1 to Grade 12 is exclusively for girls, while its preschool program from Pre-Kindergarten to Kinder 2 and Poveda's RISE Program (Remote Independent & Self-paced Education) with offerings from Grade 7 to Grade 10 are open to both male and female students.

== History and Academics ==
Formerly Poveda Learning Centre, the heritage of Saint Pedro Poveda stems back to 1960 when Institución Teresiana was opened. The school first offered kindergarten and primary classes and began offering preschool, elementary, and high school education by 1969.

Pedro Poveda's philosophy and principles of education are integrated in the school's Personalized Education Program (PEP).

On December 3, 1974, during the birth centennial celebration of Saint Pedro Poveda, Institución Teresiana changed its name to Poveda Learning Centre as a fitting tribute to him. That same year, UNESCO honored Pedro Poveda as a "Humanist and Educator".

Two-degree programs in the field of education and business administration were offered, effective 2005–2006. With the expansion into tertiary education, the name of the school was changed to Saint Pedro Poveda College.

On January 11, 2024, the school celebrated one hundred years since the pontifical approval of the Teresian Association in the gymnasium/auditorium with a thanksgiving mass.

== Campus ==
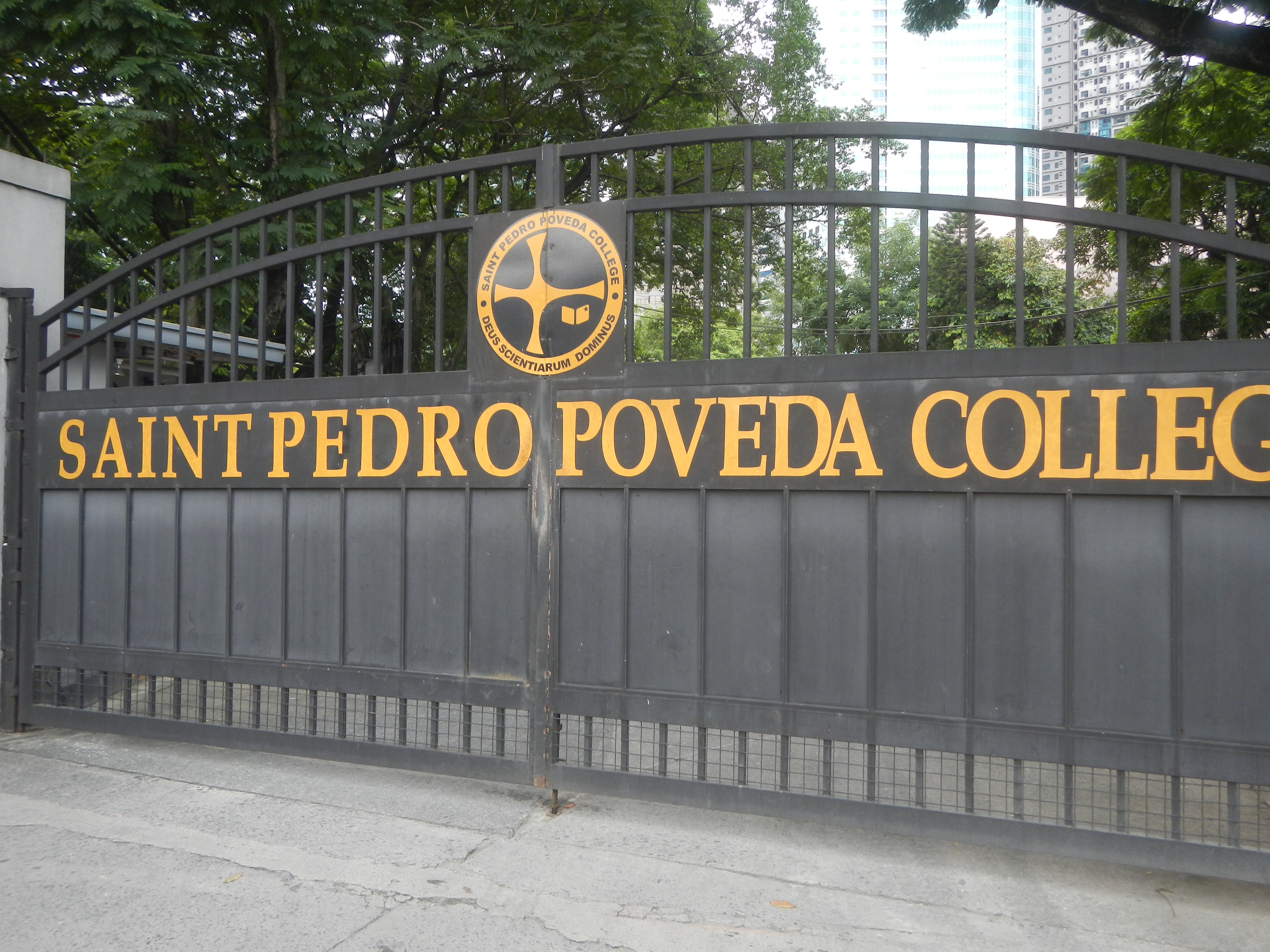
Gate

=== Segovia Building ===
Preschool students (pre-K, Kinder 1–2) and Grades 1–5 occupy this building. It is named after Josefa Segovia. It houses the LEAP Center, Guidance Center, playground, and rooms for extracurricular music classes.

=== Victoria Building ===
Grade 6 students occupy this building. It is named after Blessed Victoria Diez. It also houses the Student Well-Being Office, Administrative Support Services Office, Archives and Records Management Office, IMC (Library), and the Audio-Visual Room.

=== Poveda Main Building ===
This is the oldest building on the campus. Junior High school students from Grades 7–10 occupy this building. It houses the Office of the President, the MIS, the Student Affairs and Activities Office (for the Student Council of Poveda -SCOP), Chapel - Covadonga, and the Little Theater. The building also houses the high school guidance center, a Music Room, the Guadix Faculty room (for Junior High school), and a Mathematics Lab, aside from the student classrooms. The Mathematics Laboratory is used for Math Enrichment (An optional class for mathematics for those good in the subject) and PMHS (Poveda Math Honor Society) club meetings.

=== Poveda Annex Building ===
This is the newest building built in the campus, with the Senior High School as its occupants. Facilities include conference rooms, Resource - Incubation Center, and the Vice Principal's Office. On the first floor, there is a waiting area for high school students connected to the covered walkway which cannot be used to tap in using school RFIDs as well as a waiting area for bus riders. This building is connected to the Main building and houses a Robotics Lab, Physics Lab, Chemistry Lab, Biology Lab, and an art room with murals on the bridge and outside.

=== Canteen Building ===
This is a fully air-conditioned two-story building. Both floors are used as dining areas, and the second floor is connected to Alameda Hall.

=== Covered Walk ===
This is an outdoor walkway connecting all of the buildings. It has tables and benches as well as boards used by students for projects. The walkway has multiple water fountains.

=== Big Field ===
This is an outdoor field used for Physical Education classes and a common hangout area for students during break times as well as before and after classes. This field has four soccer goals. It originally had real grass, but it became muddy after students played sports, causing the school to replace it with synthetic grass that cannot flood with normal rainfall. The part of the field near the IMC is used as a waiting area for bus riders.

=== Lanuza Lobby ===
This is the grade school waiting area and tap-in area for students. It is open longer than the Poveda Annex waiting area. High school students with siblings in grade school can also use this exit. On occasions when the Poveda Annex waiting area is closed, all students use this exit to tap out. The waiting area is connected to an air-conditioned building below Alameda Hall which houses the Registrar and Admissions Office, HRMDO, and Finance.

=== Alameda Hall ===
This is a dining area used by students with pathways connecting to the canteen, gymnasium/auditorium, covered walk, and the Segovia Building. This hallway is often used for things such as batch shops and book fairs. The hall also houses a multi-purpose room and studio.

=== Gymnasium/Auditorium ===
This building has a wooden court used for various sports and occasionally for events and fairs. Typically during assemblies and masses, grades 7 and 8 occupy the wooden court whereas grades 9 to 12 occupy the bleachers. The main gym is fully air-conditioned. The main gym has another room connected to it. This room is typically used for things such as events and has cement flooring.

== Notable Alumnae ==
=== Government ===
- Joy Belmonte – mayor of Quezon City; daughter of journalist Betty Go-Belmonte and former House speaker and Quezon City mayor Feliciano Belmonte Jr.
- Marides Fernando – former mayor of Marikina; wife of former Metropolitan Manila Development Authority Chairman Bayani Fernando
- Stella Quimbo – congressman of the 2nd district of Marikina; wife of former congressman Attorney Miro Quimbo of the 2nd District of Marikina

=== Fashion ===
- Mich Dulce – fashion designer; International Young Creative Entrepreneur awardee

=== News/Media ===
- Lia Cruz – TV show host; UAAP courtside reporter
- Natashya Gutierrez – Journalist; Multimedia reporter and anchor for Rappler

=== Entertainment ===
- Ciara Sotto – actress; daughter of actress Helen Gamboa and Senator Vicente Sotto III
- Sophie Albert – actress and television personality
- Karylle– singer, actress, and TV host; daughter of singer Zsa Zsa Padilla
- KC Concepcion – actress/TV host; daughter of actress Sharon Cuneta and actor Gabby Concepcion
- Kris Aquino – television personality and actress; daughter of former Senator Benigno Aquino Jr. and former President Corazon Aquino; sister of former President Benigno Aquino III
- Mylene Dizon – FAMAS Award-nominated actress; Gawad Urian Award winner
- Ria Atayde – actress; daughter of actress Sylvia Sanchez and sister of actor Arjo Atayde
- Zia Quizon – singer; daughter of singer Zsa Zsa Padilla and actor Dolphy

=== Sports ===
- Bea de Leon – volleyball player, two-time UAAP Champion, UAAP Season 81 Captain and Finals MVP, represented the country during the 2015 U23 & SEA Games
