= Natashya Gutierrez =

Filipino journalist

Natashya L. Gutierrez
- Education: International School Manila; St. Pedro Poveda College; Yale University
- Occupation: Journalist
- Known for: Multimedia reporting

Natashya Gutierrez is a Filipina journalist best known for her work as a multimedia reporter for internet news organization Rappler. She is currently the Editor-in-Chief of VICE in Asia-Pacific and foreign correspondent for ABC News.

== Early life and education ==
The middle child of businessman Francis Gutierrez and Tina Lazcanotegui, the latter with Spanish ancestry, Gutierrez received her education from St. Pedro Poveda College and International School Manila (ISM), graduating in 2006. Gutierrez graduated cum laude from Yale University with a bachelor's degree in psychology in 2010.

As a Yale Journalism scholar, Gutierrez worked with various publications, was a reporter for the undergraduate-run monthly television newsmagazine YTV News, and was co-editor-in-chief of the Yale Journal of Human Rights.

== Career ==
=== Rappler ===
After graduation, veteran journalist Maria Ressa recruited Gutierrez as a reporter for Rappler, where she regularly anchored the daily Rappler Newscast. Gutierrez was one of the first twelve hires, and part of Rappler's founding team.

Stories in which Gutierrez' coverage have played a significant role include the 2013 Serendra explosion, in which her coverage raised questions about whether the gas responsible for the explosion had been odorless and may thus have made residents unable to detect the leak; and the Priority Development Assistance Fund scam.

In August 2013, the latter coverage resulted in Janet Lim-Napoles filing a libel case against Gutierrez, a number of other journalists, and a blogger who had posted pictures allegedly of Napoles' daughter, depicting a supposedly lavish lifestyle.

Gutierrez also served as Rappler's bureau chief in Indonesia.

== See also ==
- Rappler
- Maria Ressa
- Patricia Evangelista
