= Trump Tower Manila =

Tower in Philippines

- Interactive map of the Trump Tower Manila area
- Alternative names: Trump Tower at Century City

General information
- Status: Completed
- Type: Residential
- Location: Century City, Makati, Philippines
- Coordinates: 14°33′55″N 121°01′42″E
- Groundbreaking: June 26, 2012
- Completed: November 12, 2017
- Cost: $150 million (₱6 billion)
- Owner: Century Properties Group

Height
- Height: 250.70 m (822.51 ft)

Technical details
- Floor count: 57
- Floor area: 34,000 square metres (365,973 sq ft)

Design and construction
- Architecture firm: Broadway Malyan; Pomeroy Studio LPPA Design Group, Inc

Website
- www.trumptowerphilippines.com

Trump Tower Manila, also known as Trump Tower at Century City, is a residential building located in Makati, Metro Manila, Philippines. The building is located at the Century City mixed-use complex in Makati. It is the third tallest building in the Philippines and the second tallest in the Makati skyline.

== History ==
Trump Tower Manila as seen from near the Pacific Star Building

The Trump Tower Manila showroom opened in early 2012, although the company stated that unit reservations started in September 2011. The groundbreaking ceremony of the building began in June 2012, with a scheduled opening in November 2017. Construction was nearly finished as of November 2016. The $150 million tower stands 57 stories high on completion.

== Design and architecture ==
Century City Development Corp., a unit of Century Properties Group, developed the residential skyscraper, under license from real estate mogul and President of the United States Donald Trump, through Trump Marks Philippines LLC.

The design concept of Trump Tower Manila showcases a 'peeled' façade that incorporates internal balconies. This architectural feature is defined by the top and bottom corners that peel away. The façade also serves an environmentally responsive function, incorporating light shelves and shading systems to adapt to the building's orientation in relation to the sun's path.

== See also ==
- List of tallest buildings in Metro Manila
- The Gramercy Residences
- List of things named after Donald Trump

== Notes ==
- Century Properties; Trump Tower at Century City (Philippines); www.trumptowerphilippines.com
- Design Details; www.trumptowerphilippines.com: Architecture section; under license 2011.
