= Doña Soledad Avenue =

Street in Parañaque, Metro Manila, Philippines

Coordinates: 14°29′7″N 121°2′30″E

- Bicutan Road
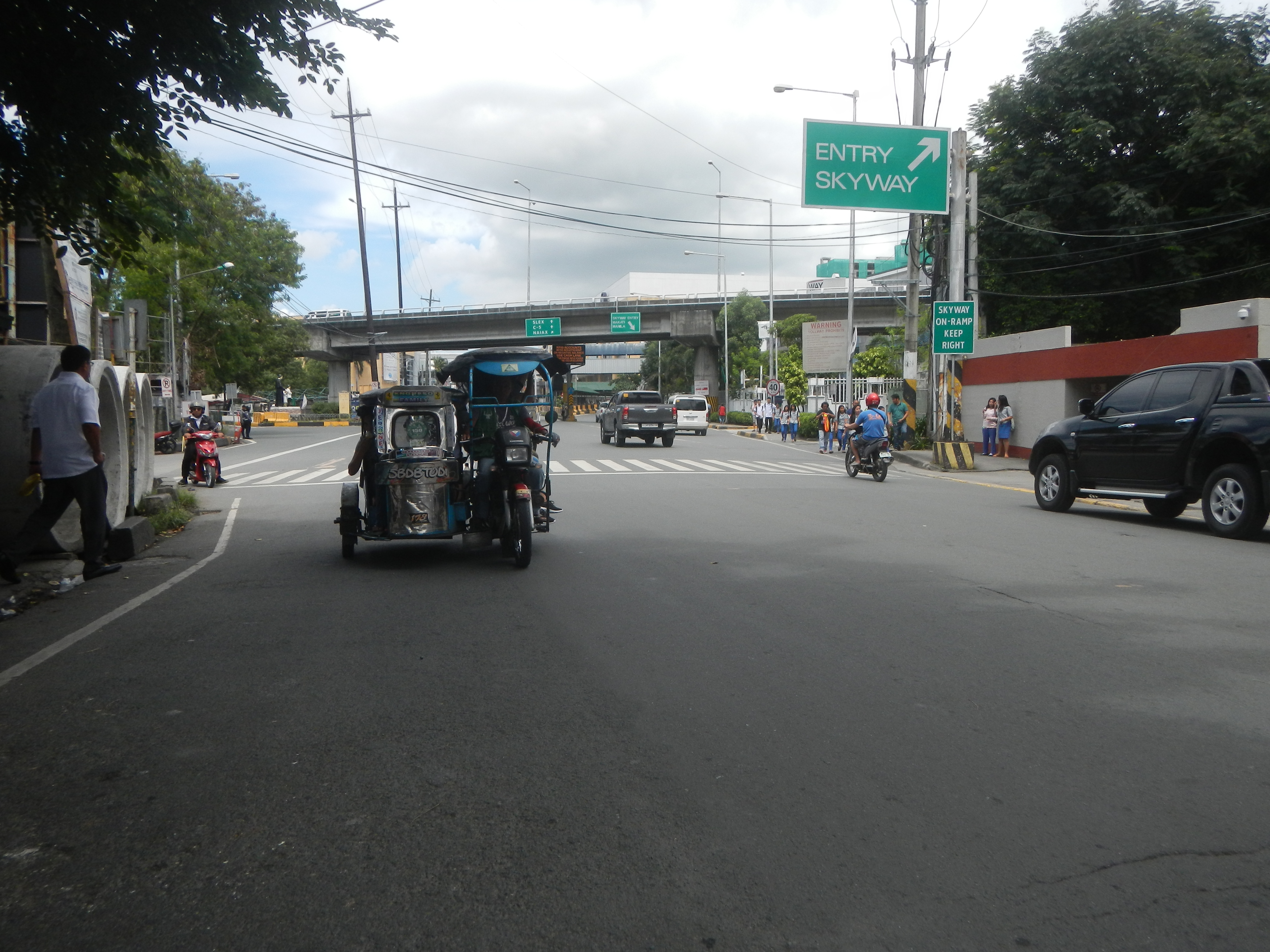
- Doña Soledad Avenue eastbound, approaching Bicutan Exit
- Interactive map of Doña Soledad Avenue
- Namesake: Soledad Lirio Dolor
- Length: 3.7 km (2.3 mi)
- Location: Parañaque, Metro Manila
- West end: E. Rodriguez Avenue and Saint Francis Street in Moonwalk
- East end: AH26 (South Luzon Expressway) at Bicutan Interchange

Doña Soledad Avenue is an east-west route in the southern Metro Manila city of Parañaque, Philippines. It traverses barangays Don Bosco and Moonwalk, both located in northeastern Parañaque. It runs from its intersection with E. Rodriguez Avenue and Saint Francis Street on the eastern edge of Moonwalk. The road continues to the east, entering the Better Living Subdivision. It curves north for a few blocks, then turns east and heads for its terminus at the Bicutan Exit of the South Luzon Expressway (SLEX) and Skyway. East of SLEX, the avenue continues as East Service Road into San Martin de Porres and Lower Bicutan in Taguig, where it continues as General Santos Avenue.

It was intended to be a private road for Better Living Subdivision residents but was opened to outsiders because of the heavy traffic when Dr. A. Santos Avenue (Sucat Road) was expanded. This caused poor road conditions on the private road, and it is also plagued with heavy traffic due to non-residents passing by. Better Living residents hope to have Doña Soledad Avenue be a private road again in the upcoming years, with limited (through subdivision sticker) or tolled access to finance extensive rehabilitation.

Bike lanes, road markings, and additional traffic schemes have been implemented since 2023. Stricter traffic rules, including the no-overtaking rule, have existed since 2024. More traffic enforcers have been deployed to apprehend traffic violators.

== Name ==
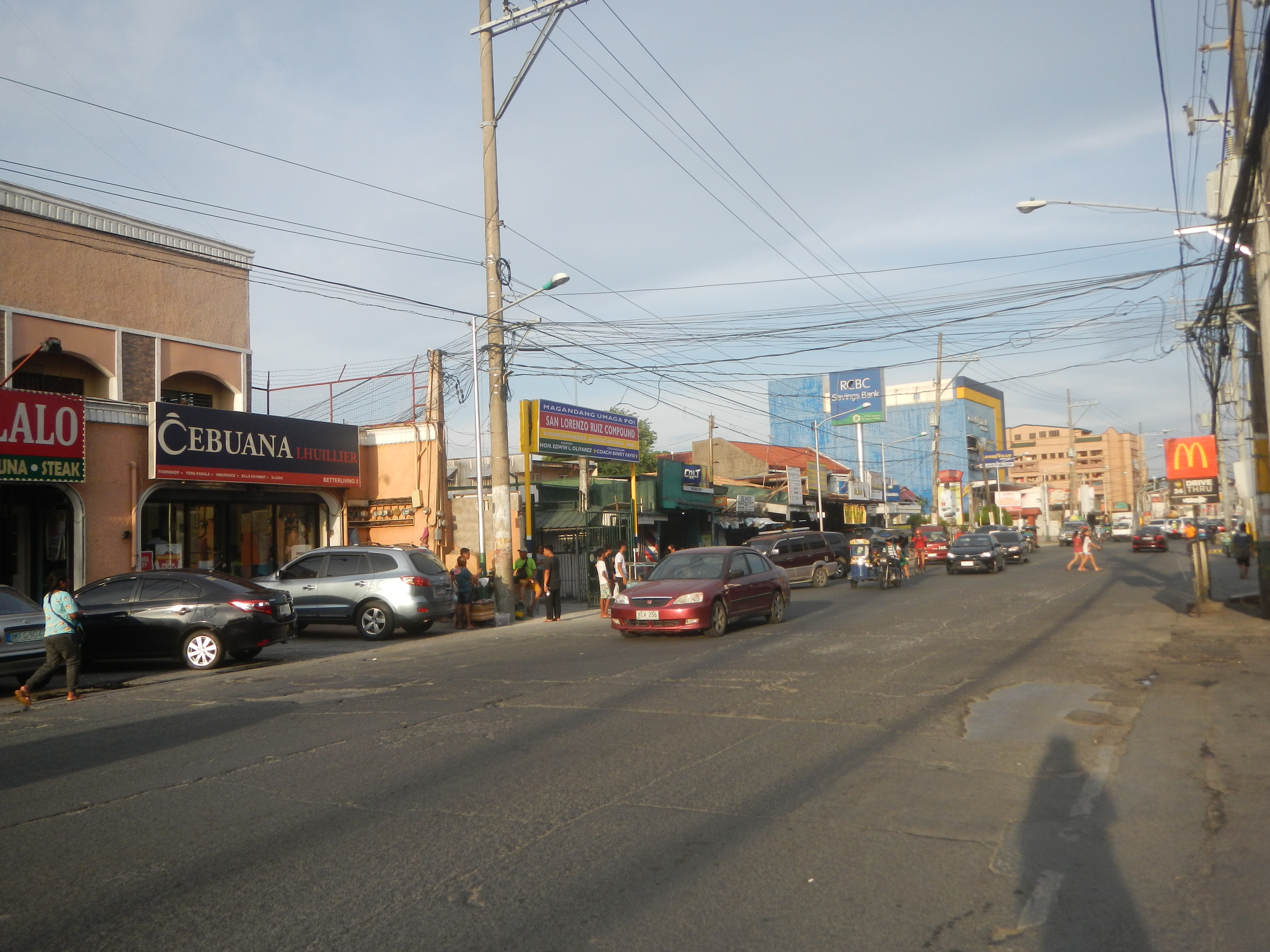
Doña Soledad Avenue in Better Living Subdivision

The avenue was named after Doña Soledad Lirio Dolor, a former assemblywoman of Region IV-A, landowner, and real estate developer who pursued several subdivision projects, including Better Living in Parañaque, where this road passes. Non-locals sometimes refer to it as Bicutan Road because it is the road that goes to and from Bicutan.

== Traffic concerns ==
Starting in the early 2000s, there has been a continued traffic buildup along Doña Soledad Avenue. This can be attributed to the increasing number of homeowners and tenants within the Better Living subdivision and adjacent properties that use the avenue.

Conversely, a high volume of pass-thru vehicular traffic has been observed. Most of these are private and delivery vehicles that use the avenue as a shortcut to and from Ninoy Aquino International Airport.

Huge traffic jams have been an issue for years. Shortcuts, including the airport shortcut and a free way to Sucat Road, cause additional traffic. Many people often use France Street as a shortcut route to Sucat without paying any toll or going through the tremendous service road.

Four new property developments, located near the avenue and once completed, can also add to the volume of traffic which clogs the avenue. These are Azure Urban Resort Residences, Amaia Steps Bicutan, Amaranthe Land Development, and SMDC Spring Residences.
