= Century Spire =

- Interactive map of the Century Spire area

General information
- Status: Completed
- Type: Mixed-use
- Coordinates: 14.5662896°N 121.0281379°E
- Construction started: 2014
- Completed: 2022

Height
- Antenna spire: 280 m (918.64 ft)
- Roof: 250 m (820.21 ft)

Technical details
- Floor count: 60

Design and construction
- Architect: Daniel Libeskind
- Architecture firm: Studio Daniel Libeskind
- Developer: Century Properties

The Century Spire is a 60-story tall mixed-use skyscraper in Makati, Metro Manila, Philippines. It is part of the Century City development.

== Architecture ==
The Century Spire was designed by Daniel Libeskind of Studio Daniel Libeskind. The interior design was done by Armani/Casa Interior Design Studio of Giorgio Armani. The glass-clad tower is divided into three branches with varying heights. Between the two highest tower shafts is a diagonal glass structure, placed by Libeskind, which includes penthouses. The lower third floors of the tower are for office use, and the upper floors are residential. Underground parking will also be present, and two floors of the building are allotted for amenities for residents.

== Construction ==
The groundbreaking for the building was held in May 2014, and was topped off by 2020, before being completed in 2022.
