= St. Paul College of Makati =

Private college in Metro Manila, Philippines

St Paul College of Makati

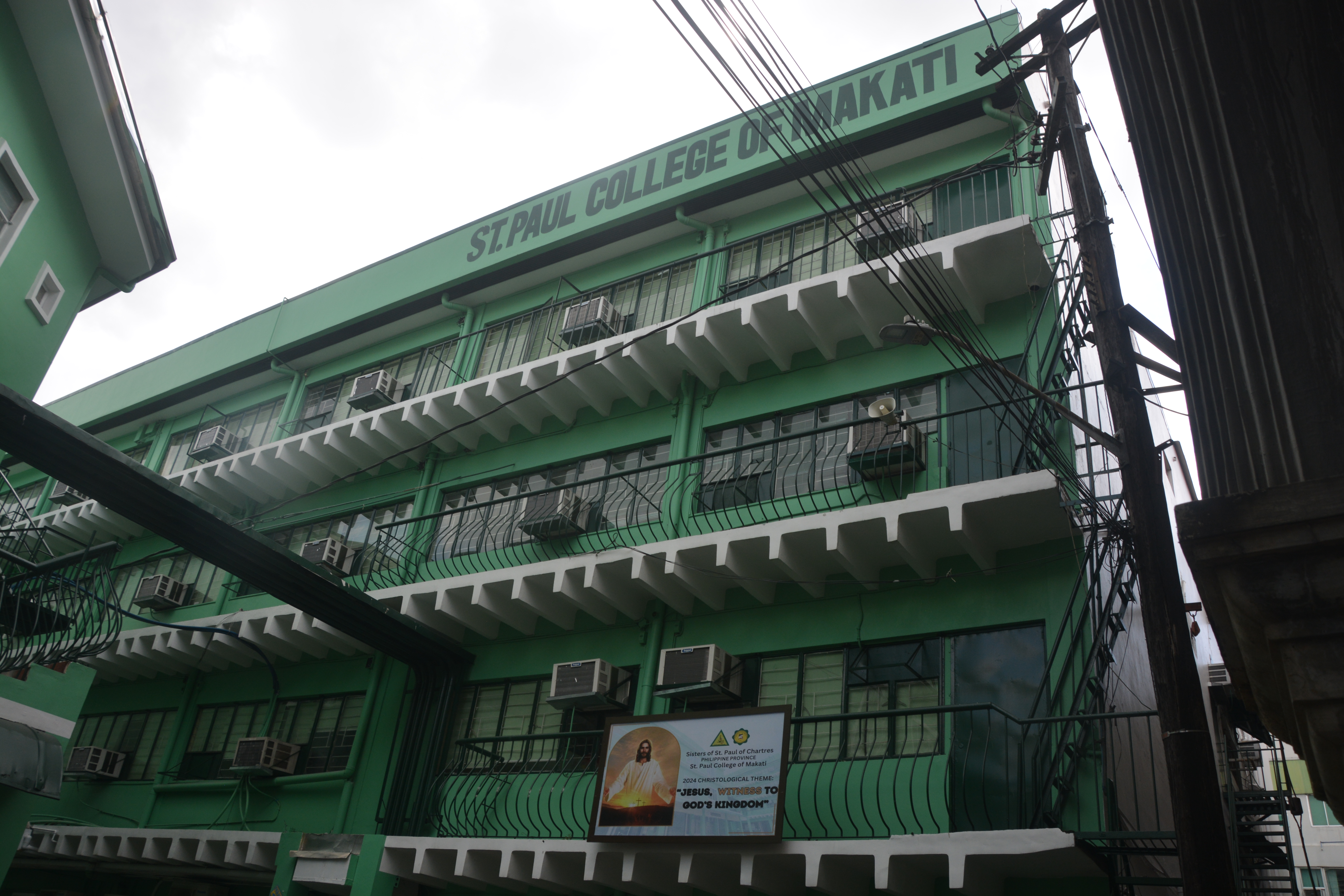

Location
- D.M. Rivera Street, P Burgos Poblacion, Makati, Metro Manila; Philippines
- Coordinates: 14°33′57″N 121°01′54″E

Information
- Former names: Makati Catholic School (1942-1976); Saint Paul School of Makati (1976-2002)
- Type: Private Roman Catholic research non-profit coeducational Basic education institution
- Motto: Caritas Christi Urget Nos (Latin) (The love of Christ impels us)
- Religious affiliation: Roman Catholic (Sisters of Saint Paul of Chartres)
- Established: 1942; 84 years ago
- Founder: Congregation of Sisters of Saint Paul of Chartres
- Principal: Sr. Nilda Caparanga, SPC
- Campus: Urban
- Colors: Green and Gold
- Nickname: Paulinians
- Affiliation: FAAP; PAASCU
- Alma Mater song: The Paulinian Hymn, The Paulinian Mission Song
- Website: Official website

St. Paul College of Makati, also referred to as SPCM or SPC Makati, is a private, co-educational, Catholic educational institution located at D.M. Rivera Street, Poblacion, Makati, Metro Manila, Philippines, and administered by the Sisters of St. Paul of Chartres (SPC). It is one of the 40 schools owned, managed, and operated by the Sisters of St. Paul of Chartres (SPC) in the Philippines.

== History ==
In 1942, Mother Alice de St. Paul Huchery, the Provincial Superior, assigned Sr. Marie Catherine Pimentel, SPC, Sr. Eugene Lourdes Santiago, SPC, and Sr. Marie Clotilde of the Cross Andes, SPC, to open a school near the Saints Peter and Paul Parish Church at the request of the parish priest, Father Lazaro Ochuga, SSP.

In 1947, the school received the apostolic blessing of Pope Pius XII

In 1948, it received recognition from the Bureau of Education and was officially known as Makati Catholic School.

In 1976, its name was changed into Saint Paul School of Makati upon the approval of the Department of Education, Culture, and Sports (DECS).

In 2002, its name was again changed into Saint Paul College of Makati (its present name) upon the approval of the Department of Education (DepEd).

In 2008, "Genyo," an interactive learning portal developed by Diwa Superior Learning Experience, Inc. (DSLE), was adopted for the school's online learning tool to address the learning needs of the young generation of Paulinians.

Currently, the school holds a Level II Accreditance from the Philippine Accrediting Association of Schools, Colleges, and Universities (PAASCU) and the Federation of Accrediting Agencies of the Philippines (FAAP).

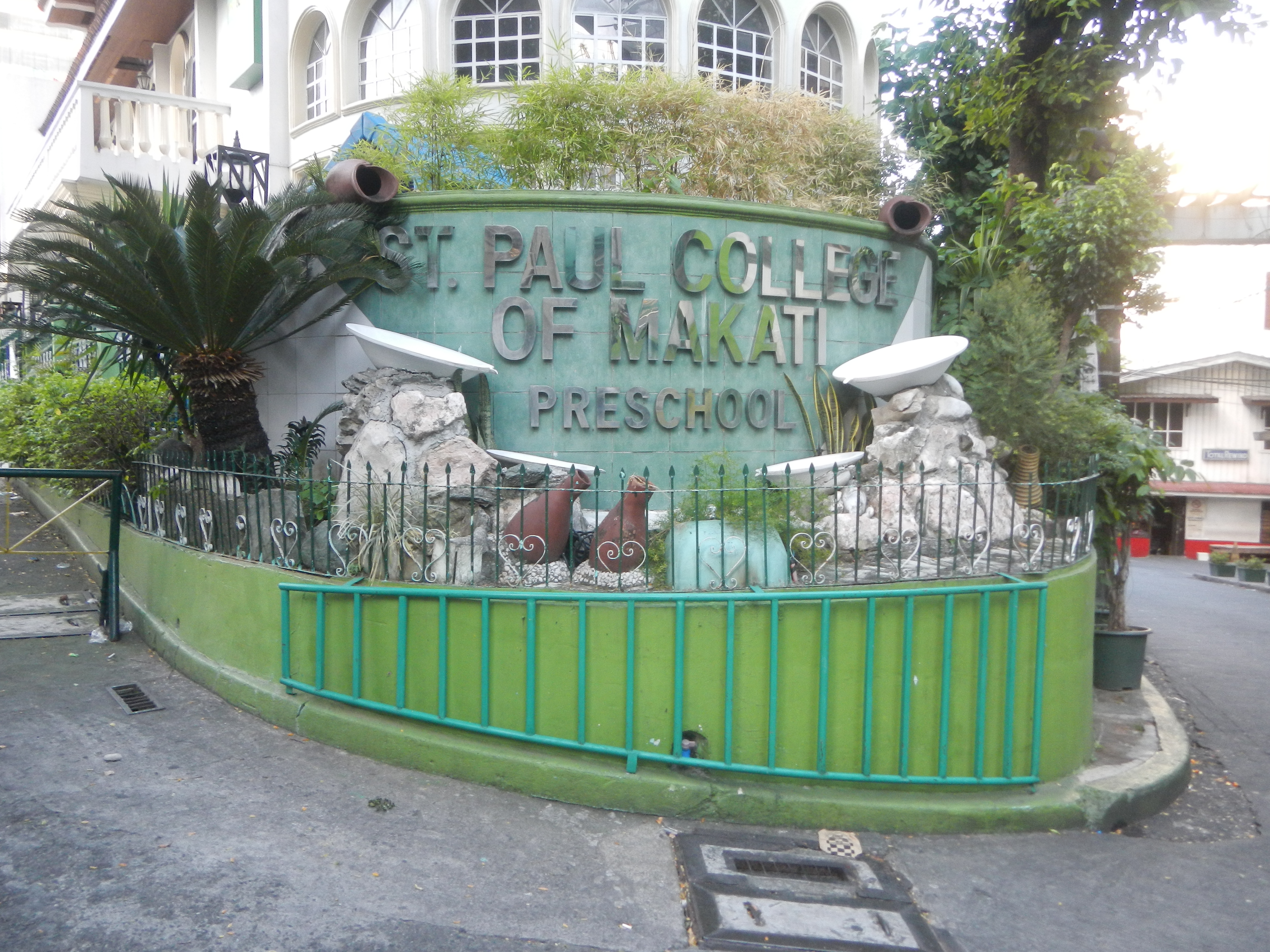
Preschool

== Buildings ==
The names of the buildings are arranged chronologically according to the date of construction (the first building stated herein was the first building to be constructed).

1. Mother Marie Micheau Building

Named after Mother Marie Micheau, a pioneer of the Sisters of Saint Paul of Chartres, the building houses the high school classrooms, a faculty room, the chemistry laboratory, the physics laboratory, the canteen for the grades three to six pupils and for the high school students, the swimming pool, the Office of the High School Homeroom Team Leader and Student Welfare Chair (Ms. Abigail Jasmin), and the Office of the High School Clubs and Activities Team Leader (Ms. Jheramee Tolentino).

2. Father Louis Chauvet Building

Named after Father Louis Chauvet, the founder of the Congregation of Sisters of Saint Paul of Chartres, the building houses the grades three to six classrooms, a faculty room, the general science laboratory, the first gymnasium, the Office of the Subject Team Leaders (Ms. Maria Bassig, English-GS; Mrs. Pinky Caraggayan, English-HS; Ms. Glore Vi Vinarao, Mathematics; Ms. Nina Ricci Dalida, Science; Ms. Nancy Callangan, Filipino; Mrs. Josephine Sapunto, Araling Panlipunan; Ms. Virgie Feria, MAPEH; and Mrs. Renelda Carbonilla, TLE and Computer), the Office of the Curriculum Board Chair (Mr. Raymond Andre Samonte), the Office of the Grade School Homeroom Team Leader and Student Welfare Chair (Mrs. Luz Sarmiento), the Office of the Grade School Clubs and Activities Team Leader (Ms. Rosemarie Gamit), the Office of the General Services Officer (Sister Nieves de Marie Cueto, SPC), the Office of the Principal (Sister Anabel dela Cruz, SPC), the audio-visual center, the grade school and the high school computer laboratories, and the Home Economics laboratory. It also displays the trophies garnered by the school since its foundation in 1942.

3. Mother Barbe Foucault Building

Named after Mother Barbe Foucault, a pioneer of the Sisters of Saint Paul of Chartres, the building houses the Office of the Directress (Sister Teresita Bayona, SPC), the Office of the Registrar, the Student Development Center, the library, the Christian Formation Office (Sister Josephine Ramada, SPC), and the second gymnasium.

4. Mother Marie Anne de Tilly Building

Named after Mother Marie Anne de Tilly, co-foundress of the Sisters of Saint Paul of Chartres, the building houses the grade one classrooms, a faculty room, and a canteen.

5. Mother Benjamine Le Noel de Groussy Building

Named after Mother Benjamine Le Noel de Groussy, a pioneer of the Sisters of Saint Paul of Chartres, the building formerly housed the nursery, first kindergarten, and second kindergarten (formerly, preparatory) classrooms, a playground, a canteen, and a faculty room. The building was demolished in 2024 to make way for the school’s parking lot. the nursery and kindergarten is now housed on the first floor of the high school building.

6. Mother Miriam de Ste. Anne Kitcharoen Building

Named after Mother Miriam de Ste. Anne Kitcharoen, the incumbent Mother-General of the Sisters of Saint Paul of Chartres and the first mother-general of the congregation who visited the school, the building houses the grade two classrooms, a canteen, a faculty room, and the speech laboratory.

7. Our Lady of Chartres Building

The Newly Constructed Building for High School students, named after Our Lady of Chartres, a title given to the Virgin Mary. The building is 5 storeys tall and houses students from grades 7-12 as well as preschool students. It holds several classrooms, a faculty room, the high school clinic, the TLE laboratory, the Audio Visual Room (AVR), Woodworking laboratory, 2 chapels, and a Science Laboratory.
