= The Gramercy Residences =

Coordinates: 14°33′55″N 121°01′42″E

- Interactive map of the The Gramercy Residences area

General information
- Status: Completed
- Type: Residential
- Location: Kalayaan Avenue, Century City, Makati Poblacion, Metro Manila, Philippines
- Construction started: October 5, 2007
- Completed: 2013
- Opening: March 4, 2013
- Cost: ₱5.5 billion
- Owner: Century Properties
- Operator: Century Property Management Corp.

Height
- Roof: 250 m (820 ft)

Technical details
- Floor count: 73
- Floor area: 118,000 m^{2} (1,270,141.43 sq ft)
- Lifts/elevators: 8

Design and construction
- Architects: Jerde Partnership International; Roger Villarosa Architects & Associates
- Developer: Century City Development Corp.
- Structural engineer: Ove Arup & Partners

The Gramercy Residences, also known as The Gramercy Residences at Century City, is a residential high-rise condominium in Makati, Philippines. As of 2023, it is the fourth tallest building in the Philippines together with Discovery Primea and Shangri-La at the Fort, Manila. It is the first of several buildings built at the new Century City complex along Kalayaan Avenue by the Century City Development Corporation.

The building takes its name from Gramercy Park, a fenced-in private park in one of Manhattan, New York City's prestigious neighborhoods. Originally planned to be a 65-storey building, it was announced to have 73 floors above ground with a total height of 250 m (820 ft) from ground to its architectural top.

== Location ==
The Gramercy Residences is located within the former location of the 4.8-hectare International School Manila, of which 3.4 hectares was sold to Century Properties Corporation (the remaining was sold to Picar Development) in an auction by the Philippine government in 2007. Situated along Kalayaan Avenue in Makati Poblacion, it is just a block away from the busy entertainment area along Makati Avenue. It is also about a few blocks away from the Makati Central Business District, the capital's financial hub.

== Architecture and construction ==
The Gramercy Residences was planned and designed by California-based architectural group Jerde Partnership International, in collaboration with Philippine architectural firm Roger Villarosa Architects & Associates. Structural design and engineering is provided by Hong Kong–based firm Ove Arup & Partners and Sy^2 + Associates Inc. Project and construction management is being handled by local firm Nova Construction + Development.

== Feature ==
The main attraction of the building is its Skypark. Located on the 36th floor, it has three-storey waterfalls, multi-level infinity edge pools, lagoon pools, a designer restaurant, health club, café, spa, a garden island within a reflecting pool, and a cantilevering walkway—a pathway suspended in mid-air with infinity pools on one side and a glass handrail on the outside. The Skypark traverses the entire width of the building. There is also a Rooftop Bar/ Restaurant located on the 71st floor, named 71 Gramercy.

== See also ==
- List of tallest buildings in the Philippines
