= Broadway Malyan =

Architecture firm

Practice information
- Key architects: Ian Apsley: CEO; Ed Baker (Chairman)
- Founders: Cyril Broadway; John Malyan
- Founded: 28th of April 1958
- Location: London, England
- Coordinates: 51°50′24″N 0°11′04″W

Significant works and honors
- Buildings: Mann Island, Liverpool, UK Porto Office Park, Portugal Miami Cruise Terminal, Florida, USA

Website
- broadwaymalyan.com

Broadway Malyan is a global architecture, urbanism and design practice. It was established in 1958 by architects Cyril Broadway and John Malyan.

Among its incorporated businesses globally, it owns or is closely associated with the English incorporated companies Broadway Malyan International Limited, Broadway Malyan Limited and Broadway Malyan Holdings Limited.

In 2022, Broadway Malyan merged with architecture practice DC3 and workplace design specialists Will + Partners.

== Offices ==
Broadway Malyan is a globally expanded firm, with offices in:

- England: London, Manchester (opened in 1996) and Birmingham (opened in 2006).
- Portugal: Lisbon (opened in 1995)
- Spain: Madrid (opened in 2000)
- United Arab Emirates: Abu Dhabi (opened in 2007) and Dubai
- Singapore: Singapore (opened in 2007)
- China: Shanghai (opened in 2008)
- India: Mumbai (opened in 2010)
- Brazil: São Paulo (opened in 2010)
- Poland: Warsaw

== Incorporated businesses ==
Originally a partnership, itself or its partners have created a set of trading and holding English company enterprises in 1989, 1998 and 2005. These are respectively Broadway Malyan International Limited, Broadway Malyan Limited and Broadway Malyan Holdings Limited.

Broadway Malyan is an employee-owned practice.

== Projects ==
Broadway Malyan has been involved in projects across different sectors. The following are some of their noteworthy contributions:

=== Retail ===
- Torre Seville, Spain – A shopping complex.
- Costco Stevenage, UK – A wholesale retail store.
- Lisbon Airport, Portugal – The design of the retail area.
- Espaço Guimarães, Portugal – A shopping mall.

=== Workplace ===
- Met Office, Exeter, UK – The headquarters of the UK's national weather service.
- BP Campus Sunbury, UK
- Porto Office Park, Portugal – A modern office complex.

=== Education ===
- Waterlow Hall, South Hampstead High School, UK

=== Residential ===
- Battersea Reach, London, UK – A luxury residential development on the banks of the River Thames.

=== Hospitality & Leisure ===
- Moxy Hotel, Lisbon

== Awards ==
Broadway Malyan has won numerous awards for its work as shown below. They scooped the 2024 Carbuncle Cup after three nominations in previous years.

Award	Winning project
RIBA North West Award 2015	Mann Island
Expresso Awards 2020	Porto Office Park
Education Estates Awards 2018	Inspiring Learning Spaces – Alison Gingell Building, Coventry Uni
Carbuncle Cup 2024	Lime Street Redevelopment
