= Century Properties =

Real estate company in the Philippines

Century Properties Group, Inc.
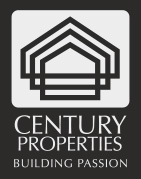
- Company type: Real Estate Developer (Public)
- Traded as: (PSE: CPG)
- Industry: Property
- Founded: Manila, Philippines (1986)
- Headquarters: 21st Floor, Pacific Star Building, Sen. Gil Puyat Avenue corner Makati Avenue, Makati, Philippines
- Key people: Jose E.B. Antonio (Executive Chairman); John Victor R. Antonio (Vice Chairman & Managing Director); Jose Marco R. Antonio (President and CEO); Jose Carlo R. Antonio (Managing Director); Ricardo Cuerva; Rafael G. Yaptinchay; Mrs. Hilda R. Antonio; Ambassador Jose L. Cuisia, Jr. (Independent Director); Stephen T. Cuunjieng (Independent Director); Carlos C. Ejercito (Independent Director)
- Revenue: PHP 14.32 billion ▲ (2019)
- Net income: PHP 1.48 billion ▲ (2019)
- Number of employees: 2,171 (2019)
- Website: www.century-properties.com

Century Properties Group is a real estate company involved in real estate development, marketing, and property management services. As a company it started operations in 1986 and was listed on the Philippine Stock Exchange under the ticker CPG:PM in 2012. More recently, through a business expansion program into allied sectors of real estate, CPG has diversified from being primarily engaged in in-city vertical residential developments (under its subsidiaries Century City Development Corporation and Century Limitless Corporation) to horizontal affordable housing (through PHirst Park Homes, Inc.) in key growth cities outside Metro Manila and the commercial leasing of retail and office spaces.

As of December 31, 2020, the company has completed 32 projects, which include the following: 28 residential buildings, consisting of 15,563 units with a total gross floor area (GFA) of 1,239,375 sq.m. (inclusive of parking); a retail commercial building with gross leasable area (“GLA”) of 26,919 sq.m. (inclusive of parking); a medical office building with GLA of 45,103 sq.m. (inclusive of parking); and two (2) office buildings with GLA of 31,952 sq.m. (inclusive of parking) and 63,101 sq.m. (inclusive of parking), respectively.

In addition, the company has completed a total of 1,536 homes under its affordable housing company, PHirst Park Homes, Inc (PPHI), which it co-owns with joint-venture partner Mitsubishi Corporation.

These completions are in addition to the 19 buildings totaling 4,128 units and 548,262 sq.m. of GFA that were completed prior to 2010 by the founding principals’ prior development companies, the Meridien Group of Companies (“Meridien”). Noteworthy developments under Meridien are the Essensa East Forbes and South of Market in Fort Bonifacio, SOHO Central in the Greenfield District of Mandaluyong City, Pacific Place in Ortigas, Le Triomphe, Le Domaine and Le Metropole in Makati City.

The company, through subsidiary Century Properties Management, Inc., (“CPMI”) also engages in a wide range of property management services, from facilities management and auction services, to lease and secondary sales. Through CPMI, the company endeavors to ensure the properties it manages maintain and improve their asset value, and are safe and secure. CPMI manages 52 projects covering 66 buildings of December 31, 2020 with 3.58 million sq.m of GFA under management. Of the total, 73% of the projects CPMI manages were developed by third-parties. Notable third-party developed projects under management include the One Corporate Centre and One San Miguel Avenue Condominium in Ortigas, BPI Makati Offices and Pacific Star Building in Makati City and Philippine National Bank Financial Center in Pasay City.

== History ==
The company was incorporated on September 6, 1983. In 1986 with six employees, it launched its operations, focusing primarily on providing third-party marketing and sales for real estate developers.

== Vertical and high-rise developments ==
Leveraging on the experience it gathered in real estate sales and marketing, the founders saw a solid opportunity in establishing a separate property development arm, Meridien, which focused on mid-market, central business district high-rise developments. Meridien began the development and construction of its first project, Le Grand in Makati to cater to the middle market segment.

Meridien developed at a rate of one to two buildings per year, all located in the central business districts of Makati and Ortigas. During this time, Century became known to the public as a developer of high rise condominia in the central business districts of the Philippines.

== Century Properties Management, Inc. (CPMI) ==
On March 17, 1989, the founder established CPM to handle the Group's property management services for both Century and non-Century developments. Since its founding, CPMI has handled 43 buildings, including landmarks such as the Asian Development Bank, Philippine National Bank Headquarters, BPI Buendia Center and Pacific Star Building.

Separately, the companies continued their operations throughout the 1990s. CPG focused on generating sales for the Century-developed properties, while keeping its third-party marketing services to other real estate companies.

== Essensa East Forbes ==
In 1997, through Meridien, CPG was given the opportunity to purchase a property in Fort Bonifacio. At this time, the company decided to develop the Essensa condominium. It was designed by the architectural firm Pei Cobb and Freed, led by Pritzker Prize winning architect I.M. Pei. Utilizing some of the finest materials in its design such as Travertine stone quarried from the same source as the Colosseum in Rome, units in the Essensa have an average unit size of 290 square meters and have prices ranging from PhP35 million to PhP60 million.

== Horizontal/housing development ==
The company further expanded its property development business when it embarked on its first large-scale horizontal development: Canyon Ranch. Located in Carmona, Cavite, this 16-hectare gated community is situated in the hilly portion of the San Lazaro Leisure Park owned by the Manila Jockey Club, Inc.

In order to specifically manage the development of this project, the proprietors of Century decided to incorporate CCC on March 15, 1994. Canyon Ranch, launched in 2004, officially marked CCC's entry into mid-market horizontal developments, catering to modern families who prefer the quiet suburban life.

== Joint venture with Mitsubishi Corporation ==
In 2018, Century Properties signed a joint venture partnership with Mitsubishi Corporation to establish PHirst Park Homes. Capitalizing on the country's demand for affordable housing, which has then an estimated backlog of roughly 6.6 million units, the new joint venture company was established to pursue the development of projects of scale in key locations outside of Metro Manila.

== Century City ==
In 2006, the company bought a portion of the lot formerly occupied by International School Manila. Using its experience in developing buildings and infrastructure, the Company incorporated CCDC on December 19, 2006, to expand Century's business into large-scale mixed-use developments. Presently, the said area located in Kalayaan Avenue, Makati is the venue for CCDC's current residential projects: Milano Residences, The Gramercy Residences, and The Knightsbridge Residences. It will also house a hospital, a retail center, and an IT park.

== Century Limitless Corporation ==
Responding to the high demand for affordable housing, Century further expanded its product line with the creation of a separate company especially focused on this segment. On July 9, 2008, CLC was incorporated with the sole purpose of developing vertical projects for the affordable to middle-income housing segment. In 2009, CLC launched its first project, Azure Urban Resort Residences, providing condo living for young couples and families, Filipino expatriates, and end-users wanting to live in Parañaque City. Azure Beach Club Paris Hilton is also managed by CLC.

== Subsidiaries and affiliates ==
The subsidiaries and affiliates of the company are segregated by the target market of each project, allowing each to specialize and focus on their buyers’ requirements in pricing, size, location, and amenities. Below is a description of the subsidiaries and affiliates of the company:

=== Meridien Group of Companies ===
Meridien is focused on single-lot developments, particularly high-rise condominia in the central business districts. Its past record includes the Le Grand, Le Triomphe, Le Metropole, Oxford Suites, Bel Air Soho in Makati, and Medical Plazas in Makati and Ortigas, and Essensa and South of Market in Fort Bonifacio.

=== Century Properties Management Incorporated ===
Incorporated on March 17, 1989, CPMI is the largest property management company in the Philippines. It is the first independent company to make use of international standards in the Philippine market. CPMI has been awarded 18 safety and security distinctions from the Safety Organization of the Philippines. It currently has 43 buildings in its management portfolio, covering a total gross floor area of about 1.9 million square meters.

=== Century Communities Corporation ===
Incorporated on March 15, 1994, CCC is focused on horizontal house and lot developments.

=== Century City Development Corporation ===
Incorporated on December 19, 2006, CCDC is focused on mixed-use developments. Founded in 2006, it is created to develop areas that incorporate the "live, work and play" concept. More than providing properties that center only on residential areas, CCDC, through its first project called Century City, a 3.4-hectare (8.4-acre) mixed use-development in Kalayaan Avenue, Makati, develops communities where residential, corporate and leisure activities happen in one place.

=== Century Limitless Corporation ===
Incorporated on July 9, 2008, CLC is the newest brand category of Century Properties Group that will develop affordable residential projects.

=== Phirst Park ===
In 2026, they approved a merger with subsidiary Phirst Park Homes Inc. as a part of an effort to streamline operations. Following the merger, it would improve regulatory and tax inefficiencies focusing on affordable housing development.s

== Digitalization ==
In 2020, amidst the coronavirus pandemic, CPG accelerated its digitalization programs to provide a digital homebuying experience to its clients. The company also amped up its digital efforts, enhancing its websites to include virtual tours.

== Shareholders ==
The main shareholder as of March 31, 2013 is Century Properties Group, Inc. who owns 6,469,965,032 shares or 66.7% of the company.

Since February 18, 2012, APG Strategic Real Estate Pool N.V. (APG) holds 868,316,042 shares or 8.95%.

== Financial disclosures ==
In its 2019 financial reports, the company reported a Php1.2 billion net income for the first nine months of the year or 81% up from Php661 million for the same period in 2018, while the consolidated revenue rose to 36% or Php9.8 billion versus Php7.2 billion year on year.

For the first half of 2020, the company posted Php1.6 billion in reservation sales equivalent to 1,925 homes or 651 units under its in-city vertical developments business and 1,274 house and lot units under PHirst Park Homes.

In July 2020, the company reported that its combined net income contributions from leasing and affordable housing portfolio jumped to Php225 million or 42% of the total net income of Php 546 million, compared with the 29% contribution level of the same period in 2019. Their combined revenue contribution is at Php 1.27 billion or 28% from 15% in 2019.

In April 2026, the company reported a net income tax of Php 2.1 billion for the first 9 months of 2025, up 17% from the year previous. This was largely driven by their First-Home Residential Developments segment which accounted for Php 8.4billion or 68% of their total revenue.
