= International School Manila =

Private school in Taguig, Philippines

- Logo of International School Manila

Location
- University Parkway, Bonifacio Global City, Taguig City, Metro Manila; Philippines; 14.5546°N 121.058°E

Information
- Former name: American School (1920–1970)
- Type: Private international school
- Motto: Veritas et democratia Truth and Democracy
- Established: 1920
- Superintendent: William Brown
- CEEB code: 705720
- Faculty: 226
- Grades: Preschool to Grade 12
- Enrollment: 2,343
- Campus size: 17 acres (6.9 hectares)
- Campus type: Urban (University Parkway)
- Colors: Green (Primary); Gold (Secondary)
- Athletics conference: Interscholastic Association of Southeast Asian Schools (IASAS)
- Nickname: Indians (1930–95); Bearcats (since 1995)
- Yearbook: Alaala, Salinlahi, Kawayan
- Website: www.ismanila.org

International School Manila, abbreviated as ISM and also known as IS Manila, is a private, non-profit, non-sectarian international school located in Bonifacio Global City, Fort Bonifacio, Taguig, Philippines. Founded in 1920 as the American School by a group of American and British parents living in Manila, it adopted its present name in 1970.

International School Manila is one of six members of the Interscholastic Association of Southeast Asian Schools (IASAS).

== History ==
A group of American and British expatriates established the American School, Inc. on June 21, 1920. It was one of many schools since 1901 called the American School. Land from Spanish business men such as Luis Perez-Samanillo was rented out to build such a school, of which the preceding institution with the same name was later sold to the De La Salle Brothers to open its own college in 1911. As a result, a demand was made by expatriate American parents to open the current American School in 1920. It was first located at 606 Taft Avenue, a loaned Episcopalian church building in Manila, with eight teachers and fifty students from Grades 1 to 12.

It transferred later that year to M.H. Del Pilar Street and in 1922, to Padre Faura Street, both also in Manila. The campus was transferred to Donada Street, Pasay in 1936. It was closed in 1942 during World War II and was reopened by September 1946. The campus was then transferred near Bel-Air, Makati in 1961. In 1970, the American School was renamed to International School Manila (ISM) at the recommendation of the US Embassy. The school started allowing admissions of ethnic Filipinos and needed to reflect the change. In the same year, ISM became the first international school to receive accreditation from the Western Association of Schools and Colleges (WASC). In 1976, ISM would adopt the IB diploma program into its HS curriculum, making it the first school in South East Asia to adopt it.

In 1982, ISM joined the Interscholastic Association of Southeast Asian Schools (IASAS). By 2002, the school transferred from Makati to its present location in Bonifacio Global City. Century City now occupies the site of the former Makati campus.

== Curriculum ==
There are three years of preschool, and twelve years of primary and secondary education. Its K–12 standard is based from the American school system. As a result, it has a different program implementation from the one proposed by the Department of Education.

The curriculum at elementary school is built on inquiry-based learning. As students proceed through middle and high school, the teaching style switches to subject-based programmes culminating in the IB Diploma. AP courses are available to chosen students in grades 9 and 10. An ESL programme also known as EAL to students is provided for students who speak English as a second language and have below-grade English skills. Learning support instructors aid and guide students in need throughout the school, and a Specialised Learning Support Programme caters to kids with extraordinary needs. The foreign languages program encompasses Chinese, Filipino, French, Japanese, Korean, and Spanish. The school holds recognition from the Department of Education in the Philippines and boasts accreditation from the Western Association of Schools and Colleges (WASC) and the International Baccalaureate Organization (IBO).

== Notable alumni ==
- Emman Atienza, Filipino and Taiwanese social media personality, model, and mental health advocate
- Frederick C. Blesse, American flying ace and U.S. Air Force major general
- KC Concepcion, Filipino actress, singer, and television personality
- Sharon Cuneta, Filipino actress, singer, and television personality
- Pops Fernandez, Filipino actress, singer, and entrepreneur
- Natashya Gutierrez, Filipino journalist
- Jorma Kaukonen, musician and lead guitarist for the band Jefferson Airplane
- Laura Lehmann, Filipino actress and winner of Miss World Philippines 2017
- Katherine Luzuriaga, American physician and pediatric immunologist
- Matthew Manotoc, Filipino politician
- Junie Morosi, Australian businesswoman
- Richelle Singson-Michael, Filipino architect and politician
- Paul Soriano, Filipino film director and producer
- Markki Stroem, Filipino and Norwegian television personality
- Cris Villonco, Filipino artist
- Farhan Zaidi, Canadian baseball executive
