= Makati =

Highly urbanized city in Metro Manila, Philippines

- Highly urbanized city
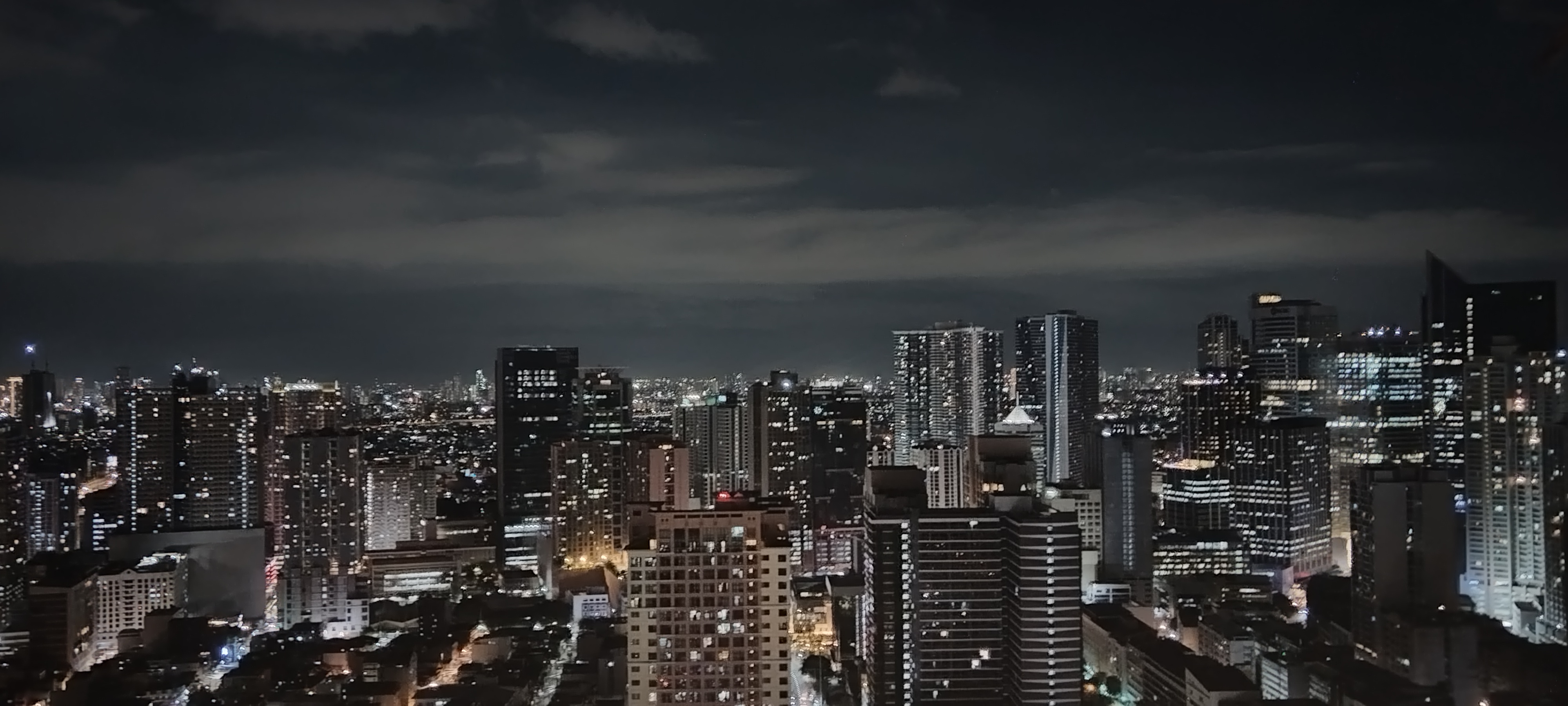
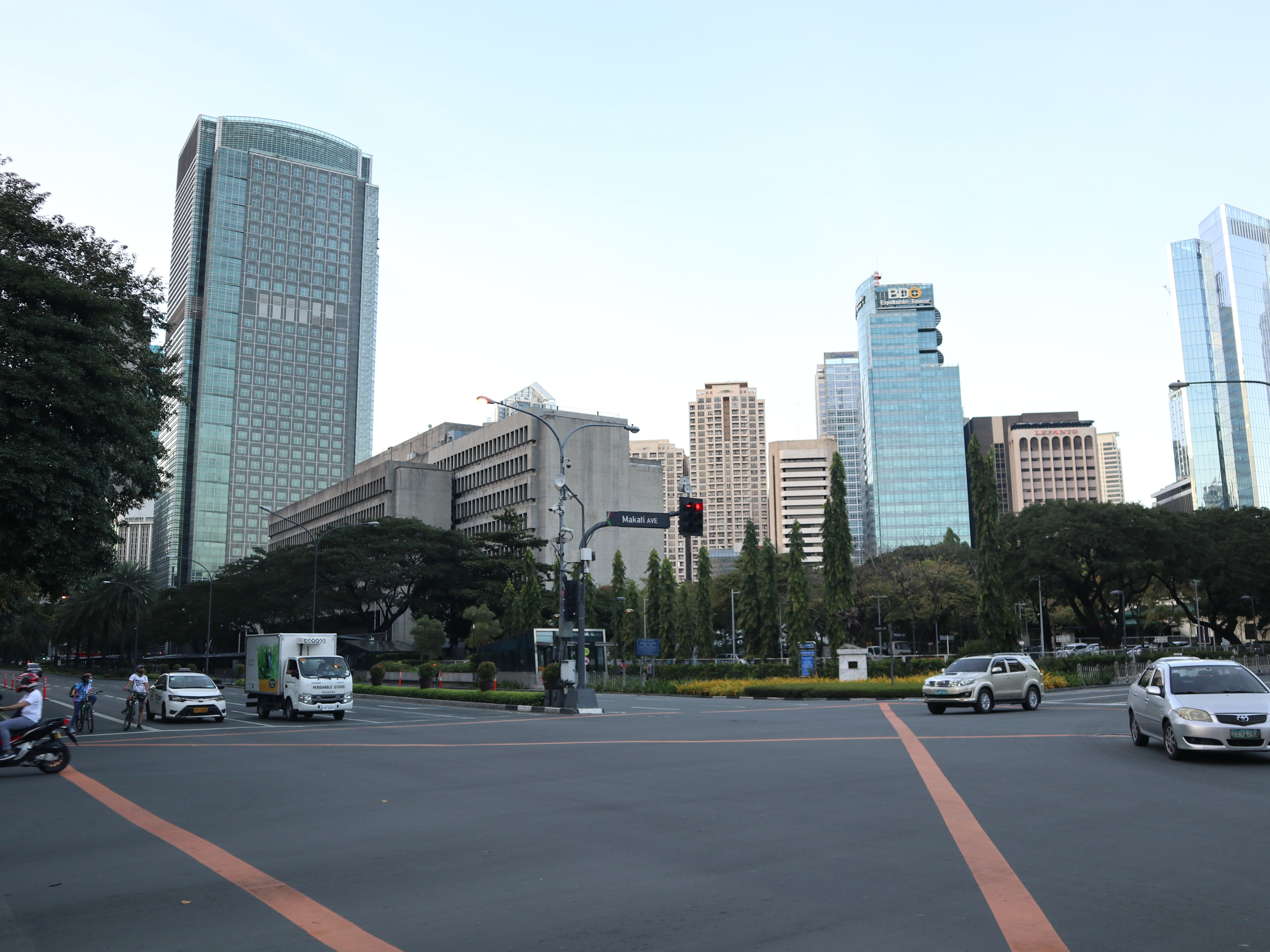
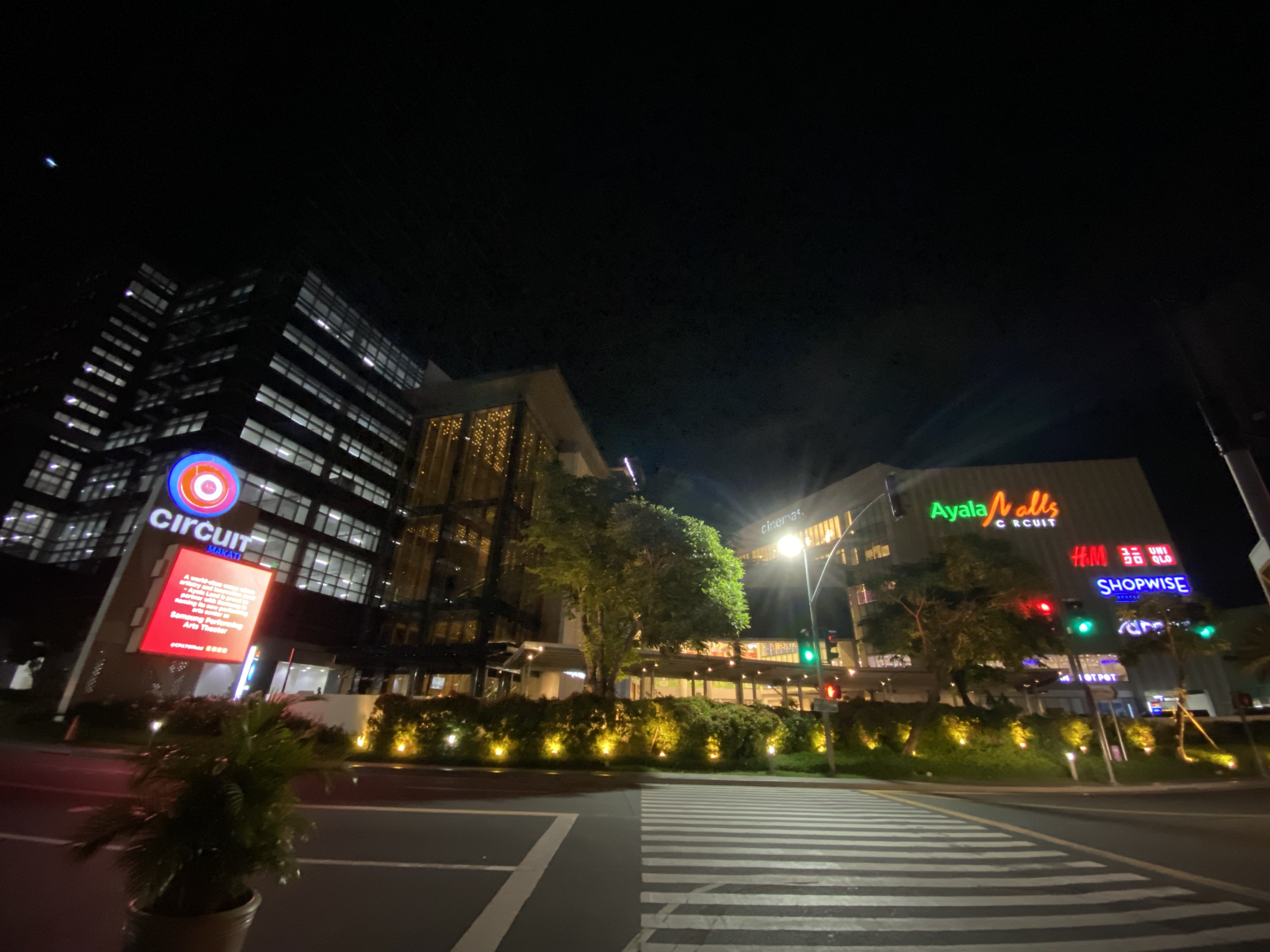
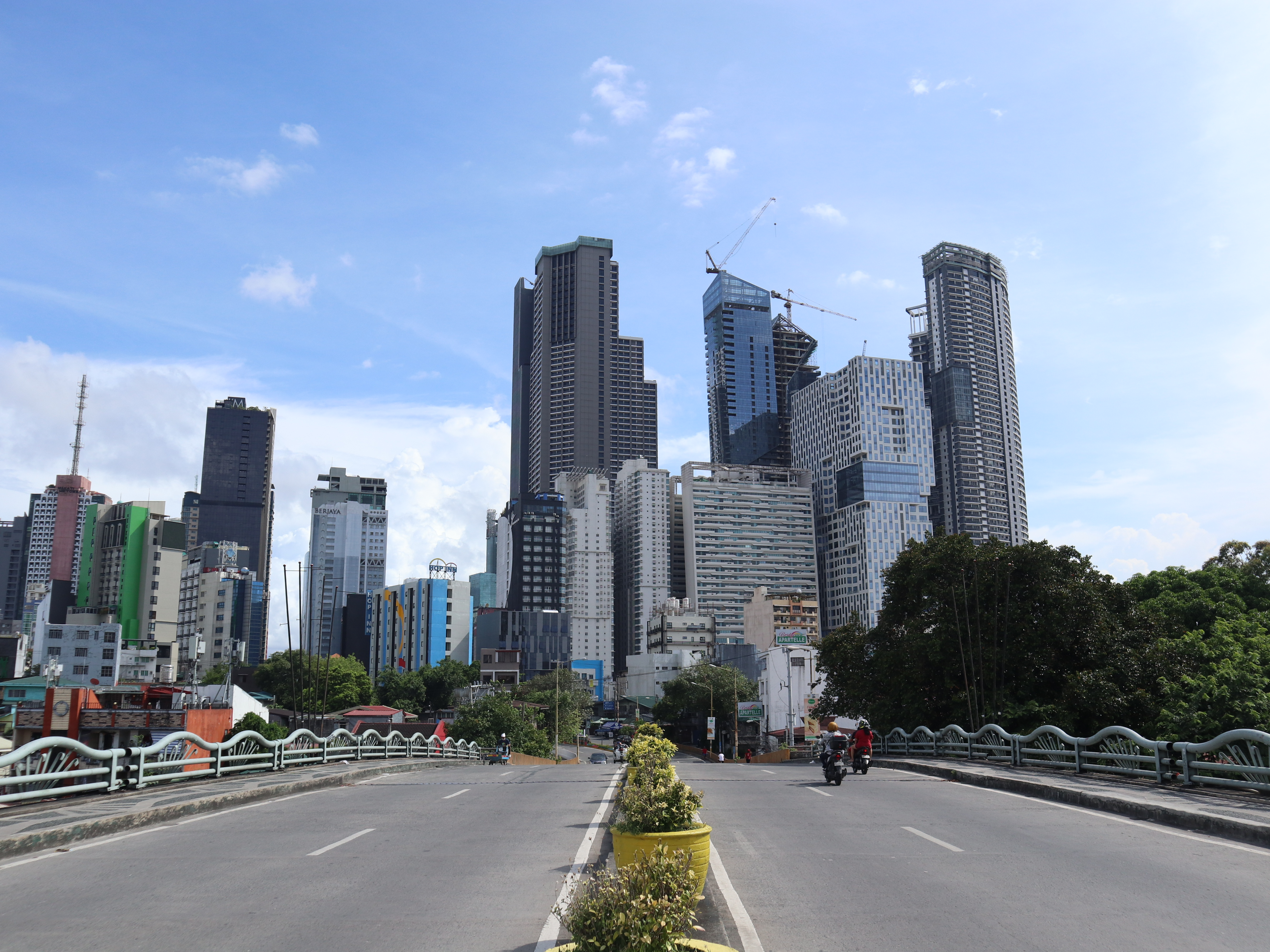
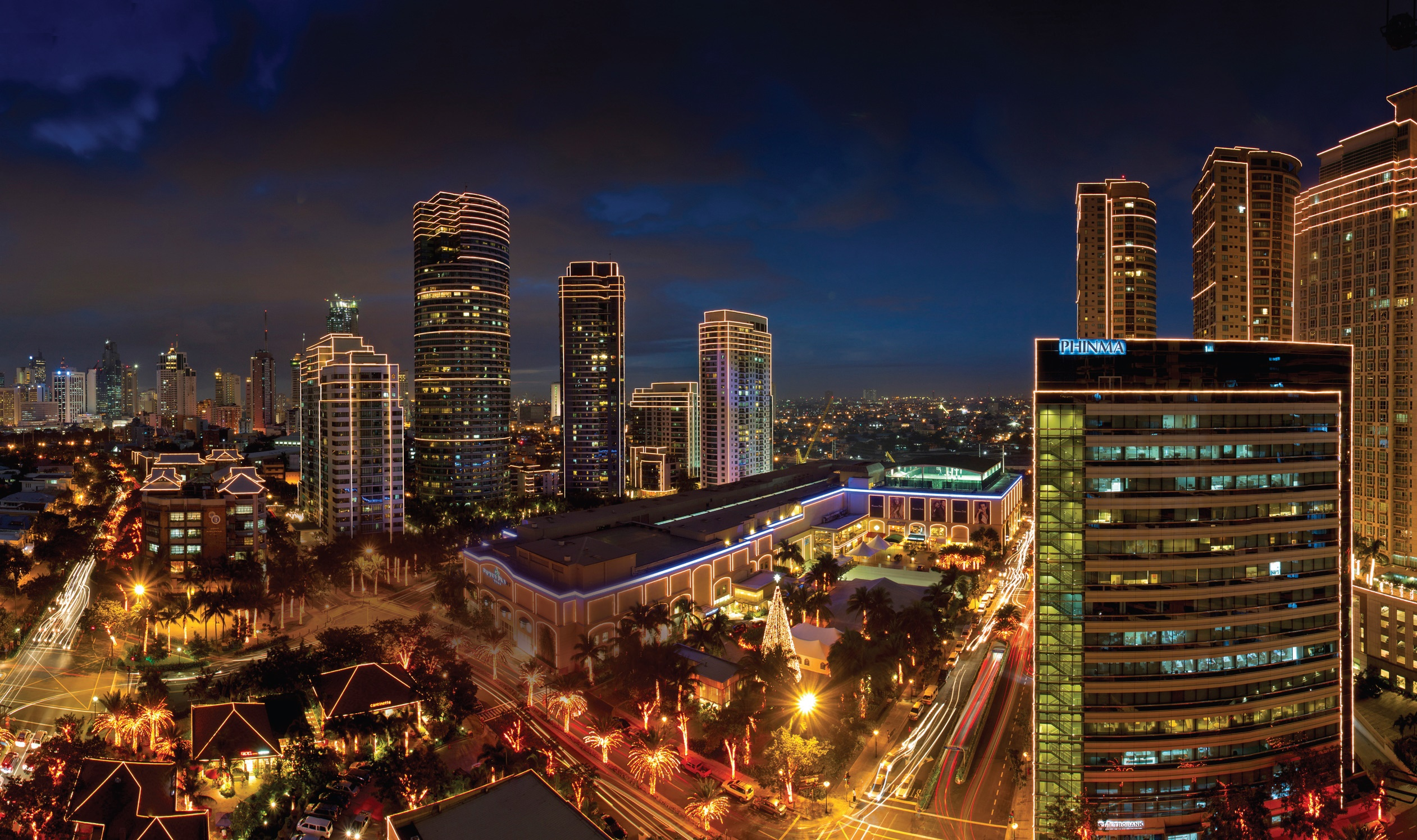
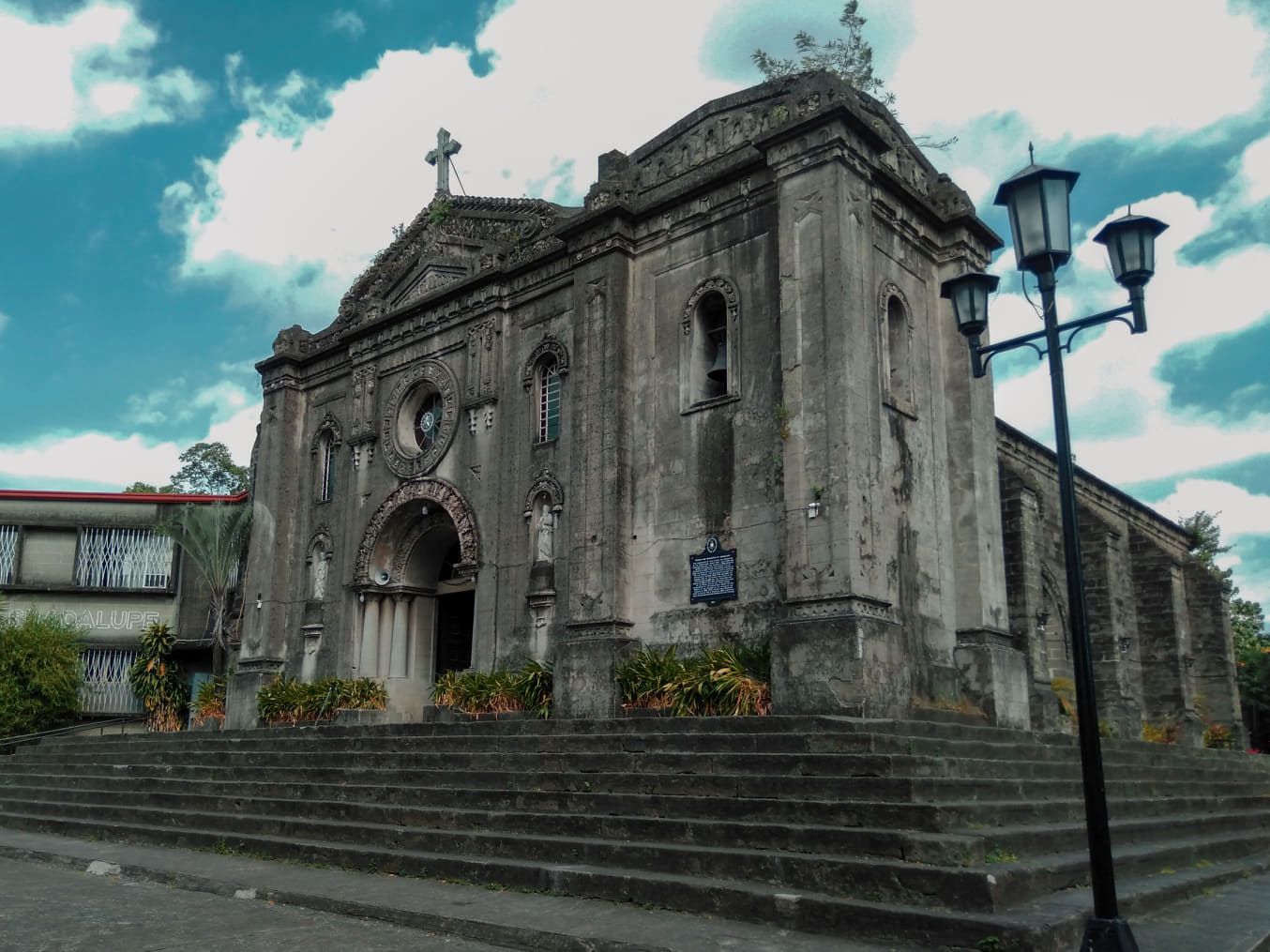
- Makati Central Business District Ayala Triangle Circuit Makati Poblacion Rockwell Center Makati City Hall Nuestra Señora de Gracia Church

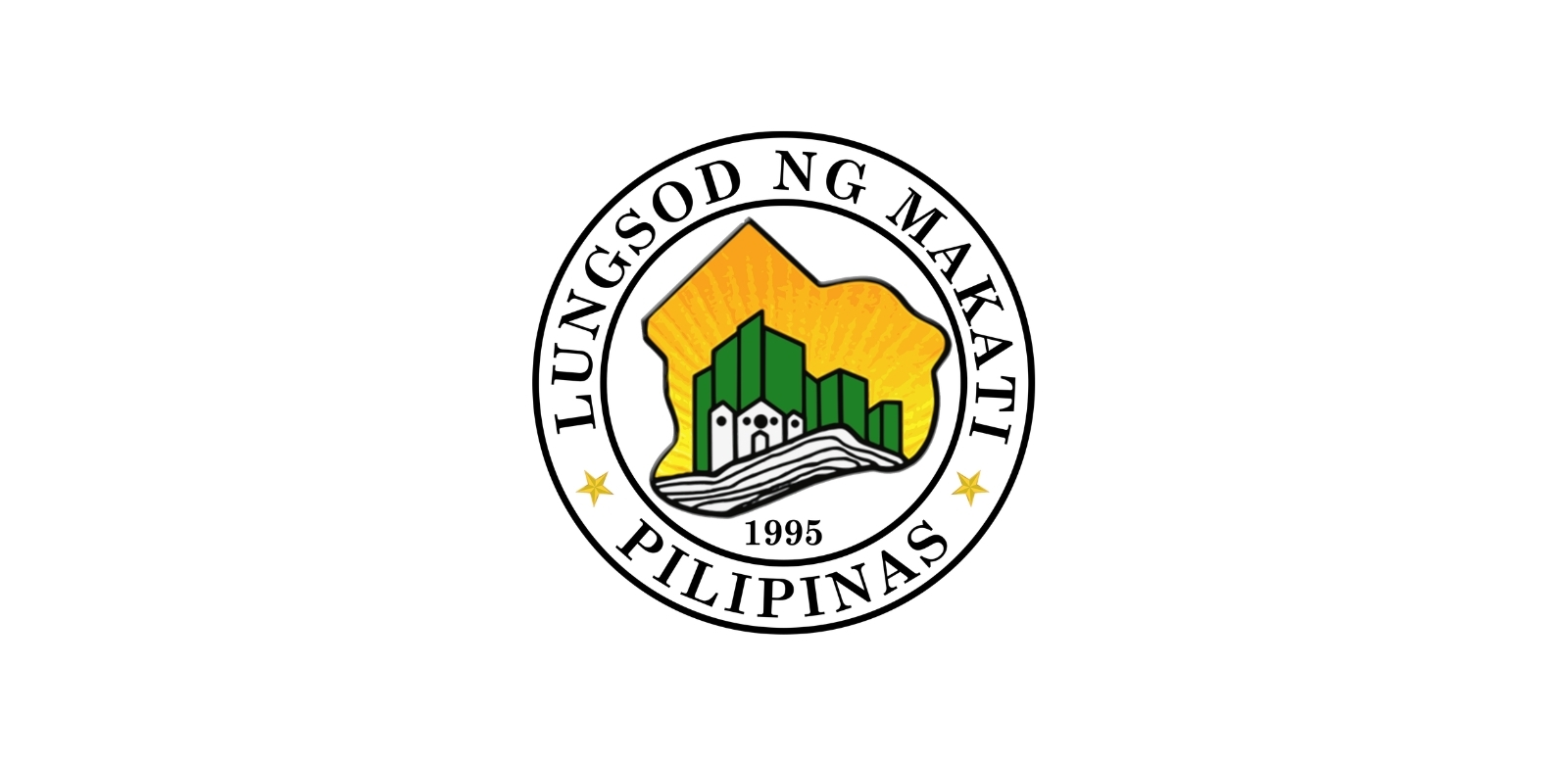
- Flag Seal Logo and Wordmark
- Etymology: San Pedro [de] Macati
- Nickname(s): Financial and Business Capital of the Philippines
- Motto(s): Makati, Mahalin Natin, Atin Ito ("Makati, let us love it, it is ours")
- Anthem: Himno ng Makati ("Makati Hymn") Martsa ng Makati ("Makati March")
- Map of Metro Manila with Makati highlighted
- Interactive map of Makati
- Location within the Philippines
- Coordinates: 14°33′24″N 121°01′17″E
- Country: Philippines
- Region: Metro Manila
- Province: none
- District: 1st and 2nd district
- Founded: June 1, 1670 (as San Pedro de Macati)
- Renamed: February 28, 1914 (as Makati)
- Cityhood: February 4, 1995
- Recent territorial change: November 9, 2023
- Barangays: 23

Government
  - Type: Sangguniang Panlungsod
  - Mayor: Maria Lourdes Nancy S. Binay (UNA)
  - Vice Mayor: Romulo "Kid" V. Peña, Jr. (NPC)
  - Representatives: Monique Lagdameo (1st District) (MKTZNU); Alden Almario (2nd District) (MKTZNU)
  - City Council: Members: First District; Martin John Pio Arenas; Marie Alethea Casal-Uy; Ferdinand Eusebio; Virgilio Hilario Sr.; Arlene Ortega; Armando Padilla; Fernando Felix Imperial; Anna Alcina Yabut; Second District; Heinrich Thaddeus Angeles; Maria Dolores Arayon; Joel Ariones; Levy Ramboyong; Kristina Sarosa; Bernadette Sese; Maribel Vitales; Nemesio Yabut Jr.; Liga ng mga Barangay President; Rolando Alvarez Jr.; Sangguniang Kabataan President; Jerome Tristan Pangilinan
  - Electorate: 270,240 voters (2025)

Area
  - Total: 18.17 km^{2} (7.02 sq mi)
- Elevation: 32 m (105 ft)
- Highest elevation: 42–68 m (138–223 ft)
- Lowest elevation: 0 m (0 ft)

Population (2024 census)
  - Total: 309,770
  - Density: 16,111/km^{2} (41,730/sq mi)
  - Households: 89,638
- Demonym(s): Makiteño; Makatizen

Economy
  - Income class: 1st city income class
  - Poverty incidence: 1% (2023)
  - HDI: ▲0.903 (Very High)
  - Revenue: ₱ 23,800 million (2025)
  - Assets: ₱ 247,595 million (2025)
  - Expenditure: ₱ 23,955 million (2025)
  - Liabilities: ₱ 20,345 million (2025)

Service provider
  - Electricity: Manila Electric Company (Meralco)
- Time zone: UTC+8 (PST)
- ZIP code: 1200–1213, 1219–1235
- PSGC: 1380300000
- IDD : area code: +63 (0)02
- Native languages: Filipino
- Major religions: Roman Catholic Church
- Catholic diocese: Roman Catholic Archdiocese of Manila
- Patron saint: Saints Peter and Paul, Virgen de la Rosa
- Website: www.makati.gov.ph

Makati (/məˈkɑːti/ mə-KAH-tee; Tagalog pronunciation: [mɐˈkaː.t̪ɪ]), officially the City of Makati (Filipino: Lungsod ng Makati), is a highly urbanized city in the National Capital Region of the Philippines. It is the country's leading center for finance, commerce, business, and diplomacy, and is home to numerous foreign embassies and diplomatic missions. Makati has the largest skyline in the country, with 432 high-rises and skyscrapers, including 138 that exceed 100 m (328 ft) in height. According to the 2024 census, it has a population of 309,770 people.

Covering 18.17 square kilometers (7.02 sq mi), Makati is one of the smallest cities in the Philippines by land area. It is bordered by Mandaluyong to the north, Taguig to the east, Pasay to the southwest, and Manila to the northwest. The city's daytime population swells to between 3.2 and 4.2 million due to the concentration of workers in its central business district. As of 2023, Makati had an estimated GDP per capita of ₱1,778,002, the highest among Philippine cities.

== Etymology ==
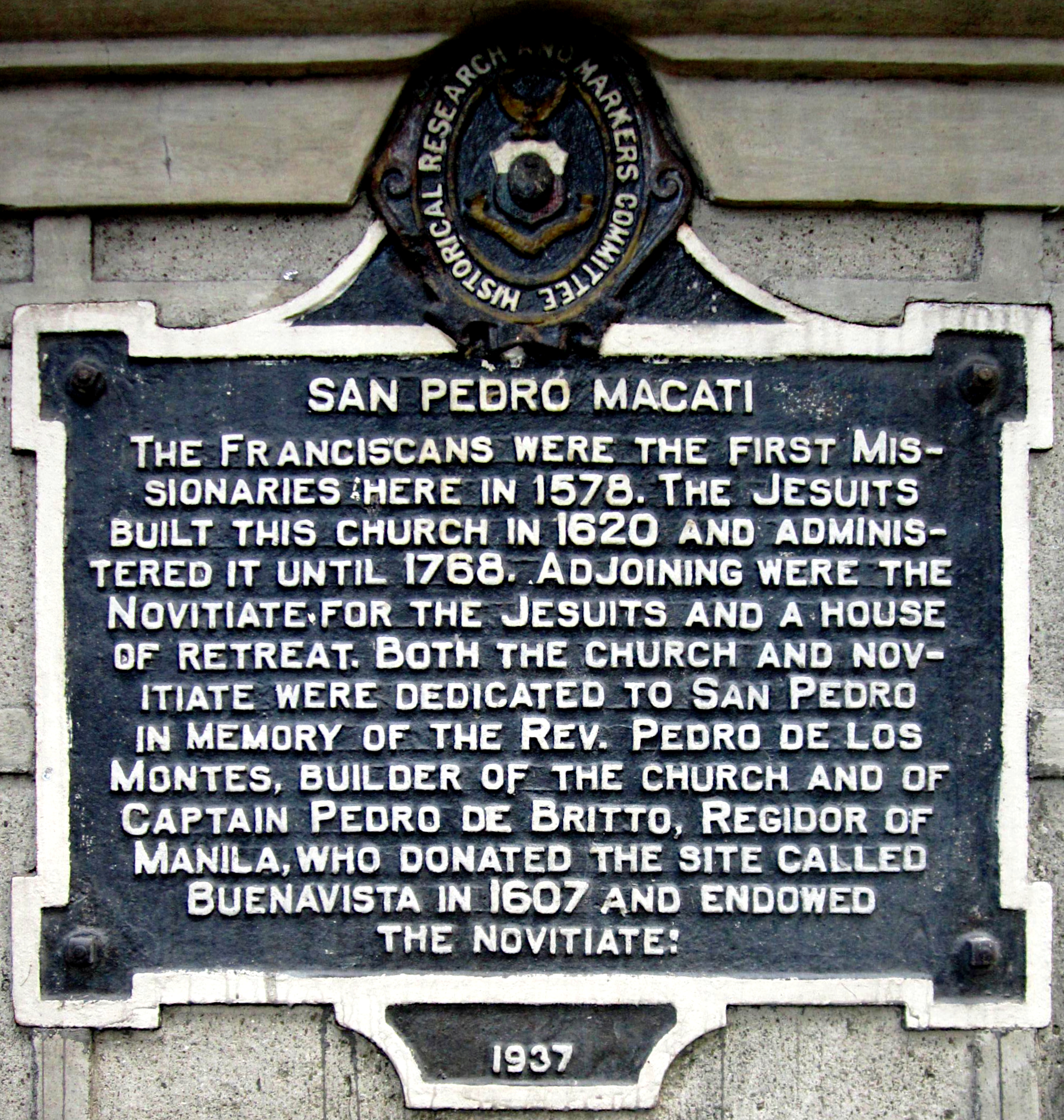
Historical marker at the Saints Peter and Paul Parish Church bearing the city's former name, San Pedro Macati

The name of Makati originates from the Tagalog word kati, meaning "[of the] low tide" or "[of the] ebb tide", attributing to the tidal movements of the adjacent Pasig River. It originated from a misheard response in 1571 by locals to then-Governor-General Miguel López de Legazpi, who recorded the place's name as "Macati" after hearing them exclaim "Makati na! Kumakati na!" (transl. "It's low tide! The tide is ebbing!"). Used during the colonial eras, "Macati" was the historical Hispanized spelling of "Makati;" it was also spelled as "Macaty" or "Macali." Alternatively, the word may also mean "itchy", attributed to the lipang kalabaw plant (Dendrocnide meyeniana) that once grew in the area.

Until 1914, it was named San Pedro [de] Macati, a name stylized in Spanish after its patron saint, Saint Peter. The name was chosen by his namesake, Spanish captain Pedro de Brito, for his encomienda named Hacienda Pedro (now part of the present-day city), and in honor of Rev. Fr. Pedro de los Montes, who built the namesake church now known as Saints Peter and Paul Parish Church. Alternatively, it was wholly spelled in its Filipinized or Tagalized form, "San Pedro [de] Makati." The name was colloquially shortened to "Sampiro" by residents, referring to both the then-town and the church.

== History ==
=== Early history ===
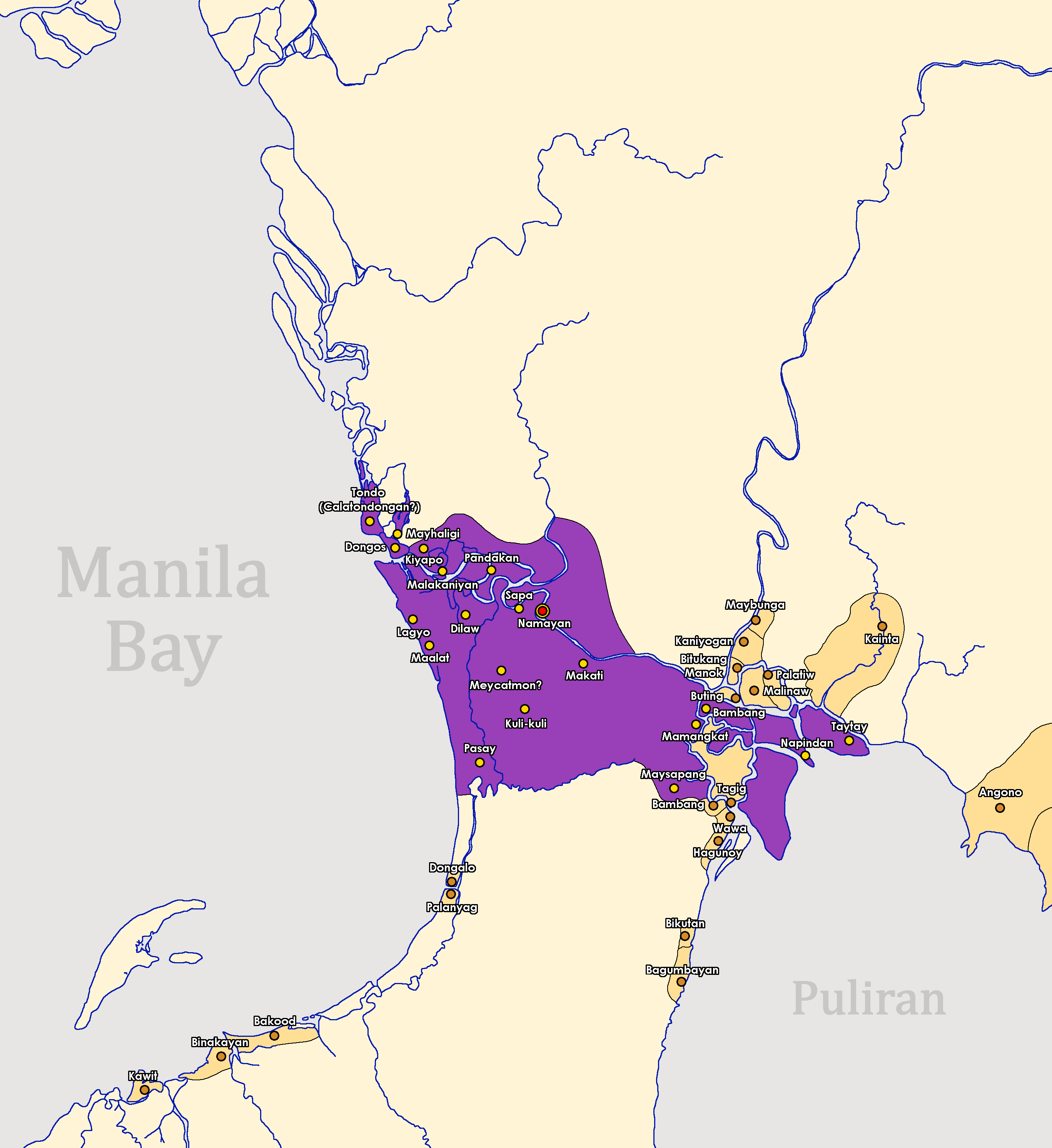
Map of Namayan (colored pink) in 1470, with Makati shown as a part of Namayan.

Parts of Makati were once subject to the pre-Hispanic Kingdom of Namayan, whose capital is now in the Santa Ana district of Manila.

=== Spanish colonial era ===
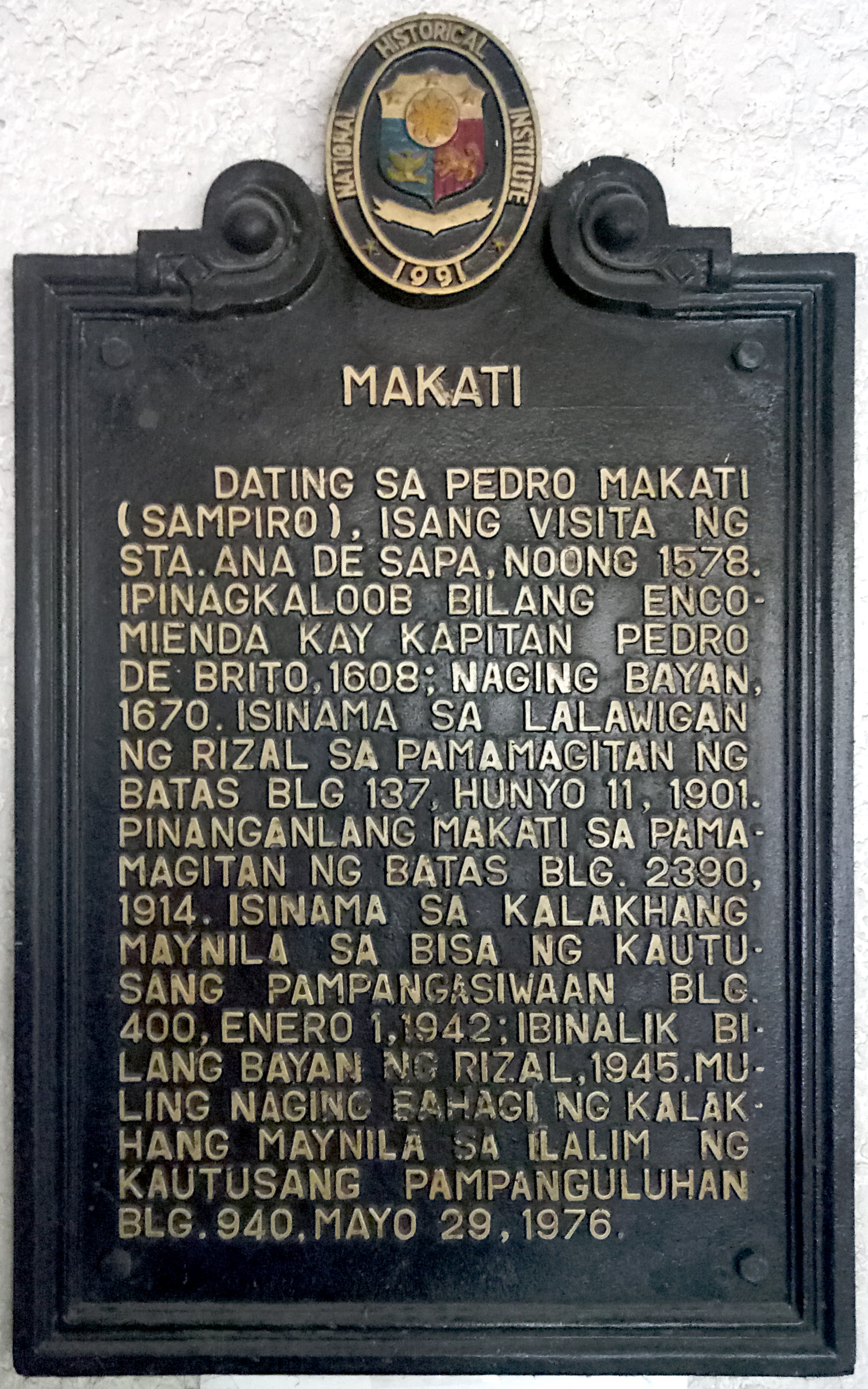
National historical marker in Tagalog installed at the old city hall building in 1991

Parts of Makati became a visita of the then-town of Santa Ana de Sapa in 1578, during the Spanish colonial era. In 1589, Captain Pedro de Brito, then an aide to the Spanish Army chief of staff, purchased a land encompassing the present-day Poblacion with a public bid of 1,400 pesos, and established his encomienda named "Hacienda Pedro". In 1608, he and his wife Ana de Herrera donated half of land to the Jesuits, with the condition of building a church in honor of his namesake, Saint Peter the Apostle, and endowed 14,000 pesos for its construction. The church, later known as San Pedro Macati Church, was completed in 1620.

==== Establishment and early development ====
While under the jurisdiction of the Franciscan friars during the 17th century, it was established as a town on June 1, 1670, under the name San Pedro de Macati out of Santa Ana de Sapa. The nearby Nuestra Señora de Gracia Church, changed into the "Our Lady of Guadalupe" church, welcomed an image of the Virgin Mary and devotees from Mexico, and one person from a family in Makati, the Montes De Oca family, who according to Rafael Bernal says had come from Mexico themselves, this family had produced Isidoro Montes de Oca, who became pivotal in the Mexican War of Independence against Spain. This parish had a large spiritual jurisdiction in the province of Tondo (later known as Manila), extending up to Muntinlupa.

In 1851, Don José Bonifacio Róxas, an ancestor of the Zóbel de Ayala family, purchased the estate from the Jesuits for 52,800 pesos and named it "Hacienda San Pedro de Macati". Since then, the development of Makati has remained linked with the family and their publicly listed company, Ayala Corporation. In 1890, San Pedro de Macati was proclaimed as a public town of Manila province. During this period, aside from the poblacion, the town had four outer barrios: Guadalupe, Olympia, Tejeros, and Culi-Culi.

=== American occupation ===
California and Idaho troops at the San Pedro de Macati Cemetery (present-day Plaza Cristo Rey) during the 1899 Battle of Manila

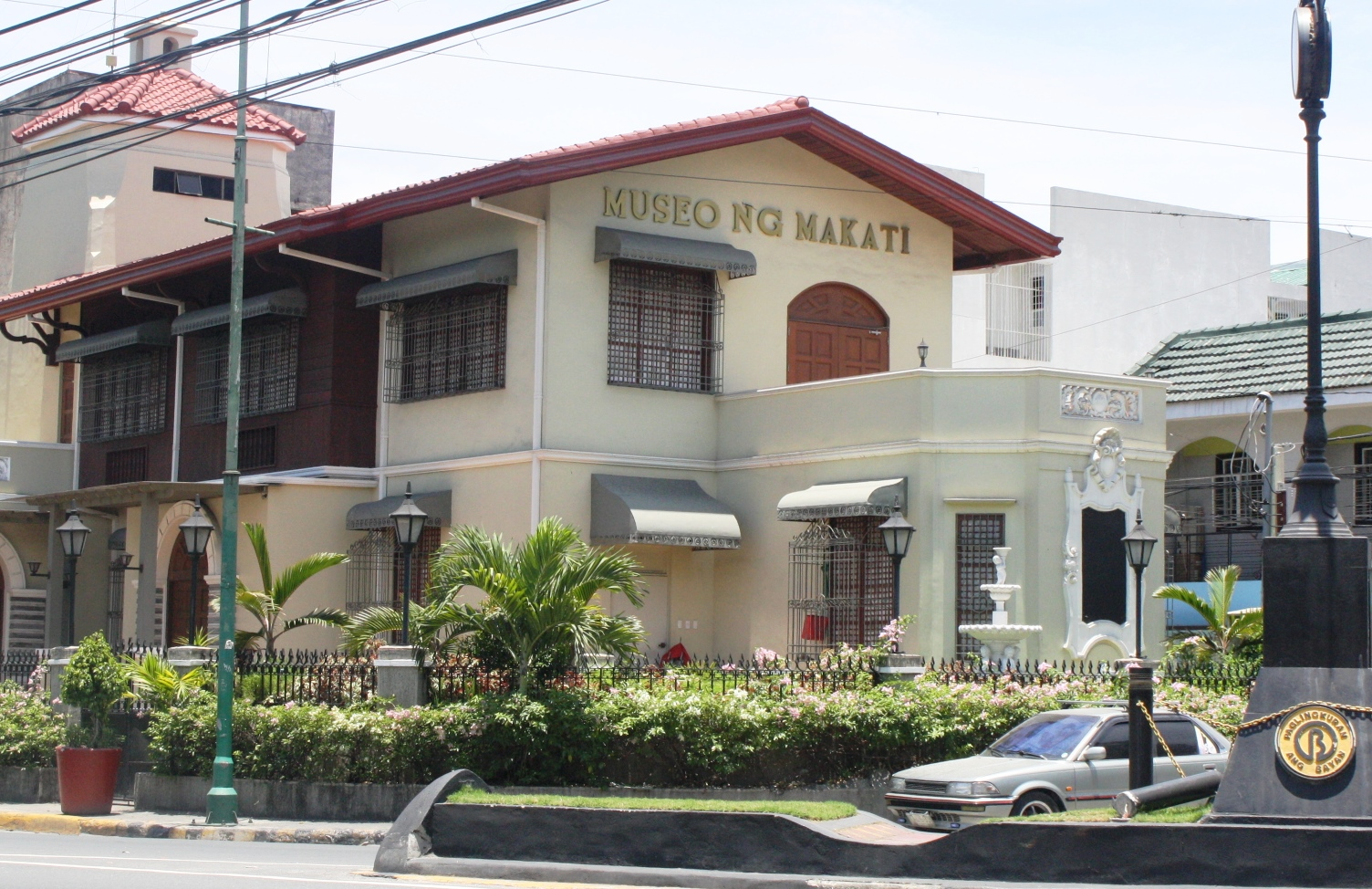
The building that is now Museo ng Makati served as the municipal hall of Makati from 1918 to 1961.

In 1901, San Pedro Macati was incorporated into the newly established province of Rizal. On February 28, 1914, the name of the town was shortened to its present name of Makati, under Philippine Legislature Act No. 2390.

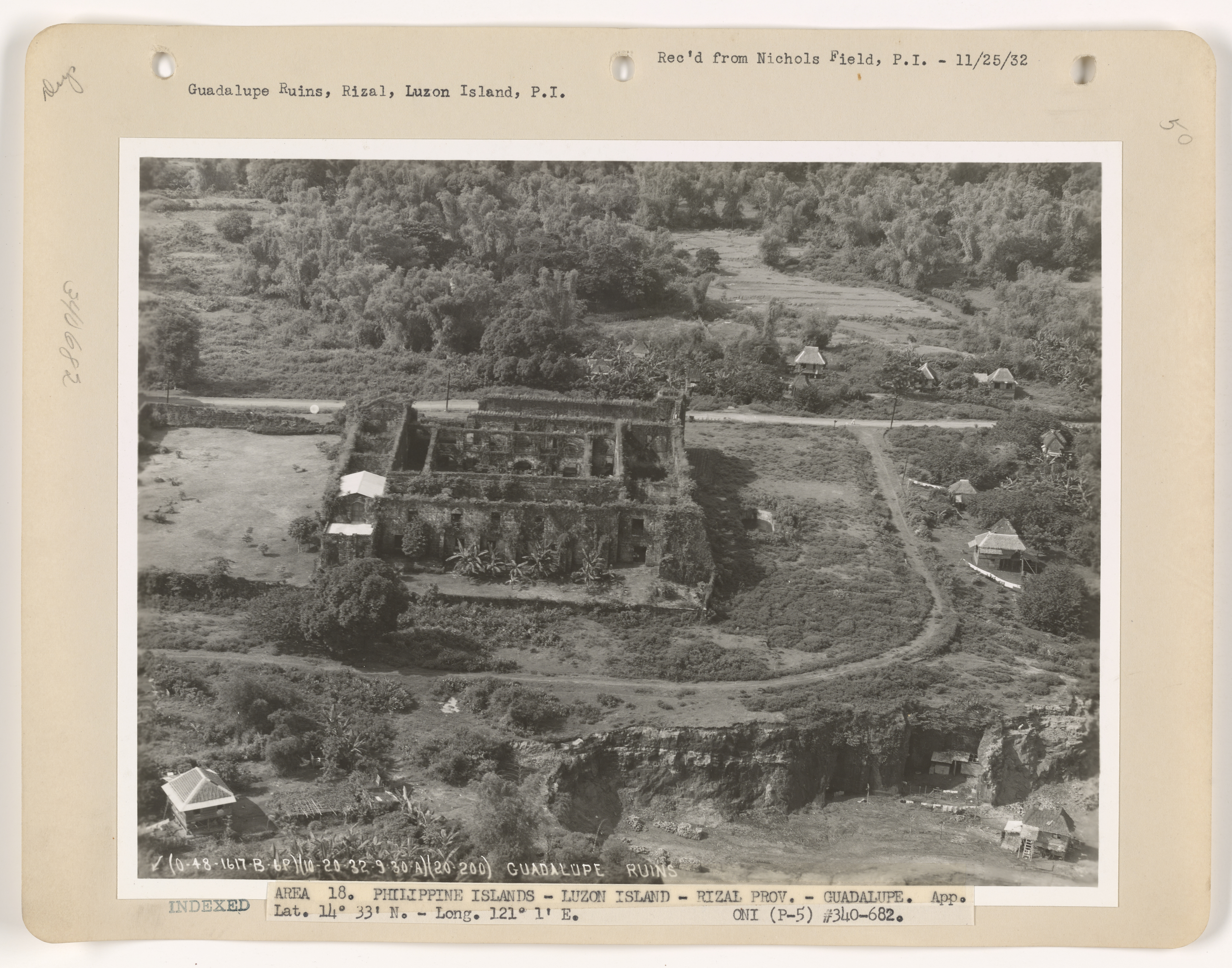
Aerial view of the Guadalupe ruins, 1932

In 1934, Makati had grown to 14 barangays according to the Rizal provincial directory, namely: Poblacion, Comandante Carmona, Culiculi, Guadalupe, Fort McKinley, Malapadnabato (present-day West Rembo), Masilang (present-day South Cembo), Kasilawan, Olimpia (Olympia), Palanan, Pinagkaisajan (Pinagkaisahan), Rural, Sampalukan, and Tejeros. The villages of Fort McKinley, Malapadnabato, and Masilang were previously parts of Pateros.

=== Japanese occupation ===
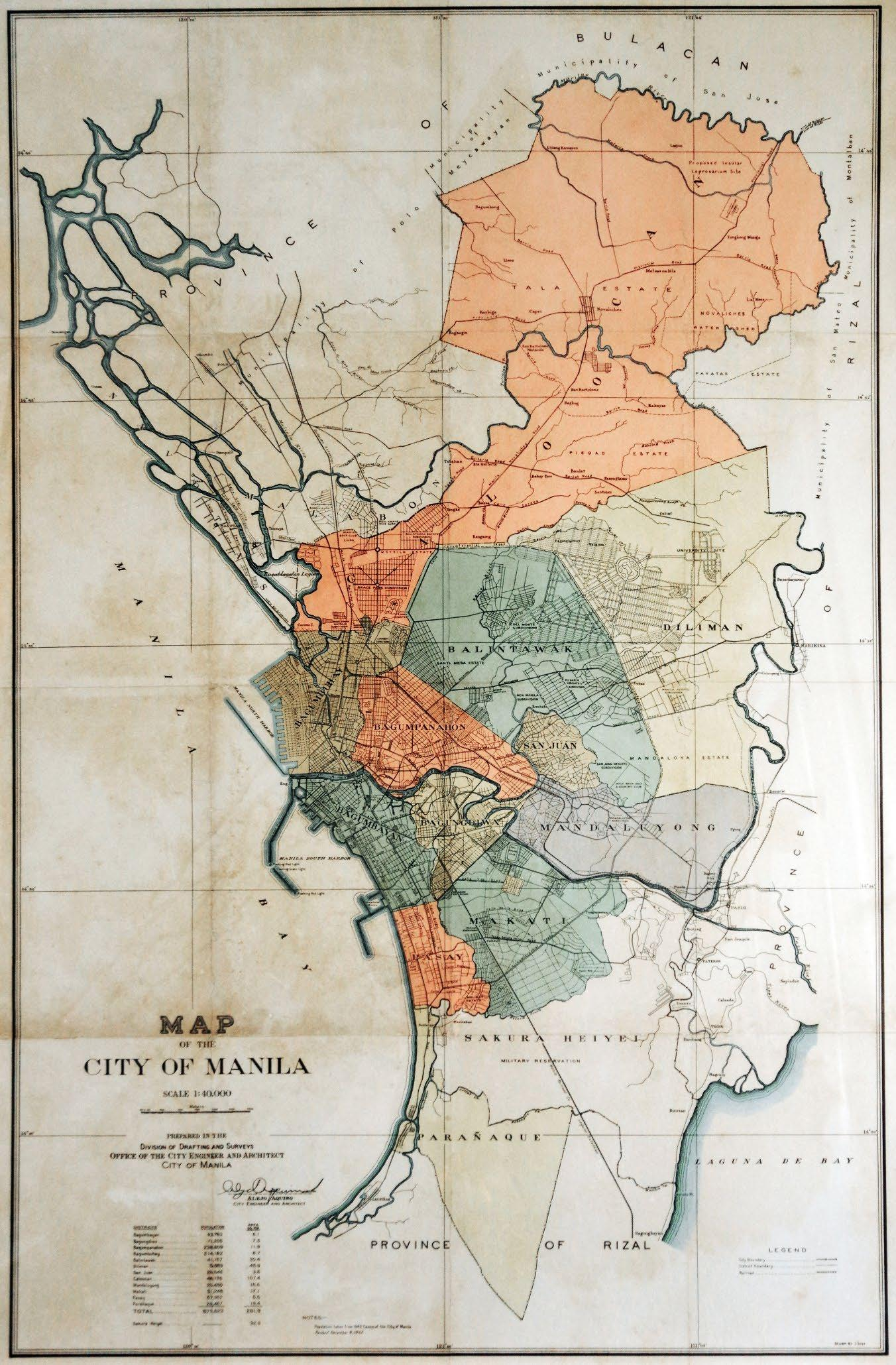
Map of the City of Greater Manila, showing Makati's territory aligned with its present-day boundaries.

On January 1, 1942, Makati was one of the municipalities of Rizal merged alongside Manila and Quezon City to form the City of Greater Manila as an emergency measure by President Manuel L. Quezon. The Fort McKinley military reservation, however, was explicitly excluded from Greater Manila; it was renamed as Sakura Heiyei by Japanese forces. Makati regained its pre-war status as a municipality of Rizal when the City of Greater Manila was dissolved by President Sergio Osmeña effective August 1, 1945.

=== Post-war Era ===
After the destruction that the Second World War brought upon Manila, and the subsequent closure of Nielson Field, the town grew rapidly, and real estate values boomed. The first of the planned communities (in what are now the barangays Forbes Park, Urdaneta, San Lorenzo, and Bel-Air established during those times) were established in the 1950s with the efforts of its landowner, Ayala y Compañía. At the same time, Fort McKinley, then renamed Fort Bonifacio, and the then Philippine Army headquarters, became the starting point for the building up of seven more communities by military families who worked in the base area. New office buildings were built on what is now the Makati Central Business District (CBD). Since the late 1960s, Makati has transformed into the financial and commercial capital of the country. During this period, several barrios were converted into new independent barangays, while additional barangays were established by subdividing existing villages. In December 1972, two barrios (later barangay) of Makati were established at the Inner Fort Bonifacio area: Post Proper Northside and Post Proper Southside.

On November 7, 1975, Makati was separated from Rizal province to become part of the National Capital Region as a component municipality.

=== Martial Law and Corazon Aquino eras ===
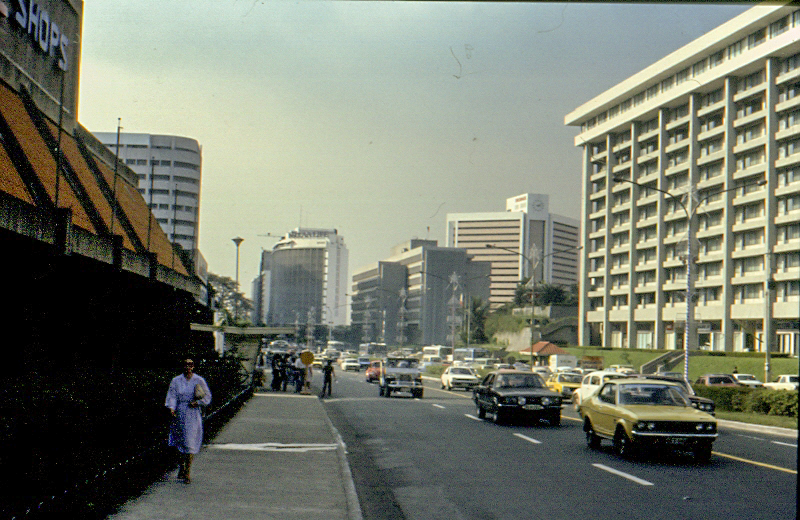
Ayala Avenue (1982)

The beginning months of the 1970s marked a period of turmoil and change in the Philippines, particularly for the areas near the capital. A sudden glut of debt driven public works projects in the late 1960s led the Philippine economy to a sudden downward turn known as the 1969 Philippine balance of payments crisis, which in turn led to a period of economic difficulty and social unrest. With only a year left in his last constitutionally allowed term as president Ferdinand Marcos placed the Philippines under Martial Law in September 1972 and thus retained the position for fourteen more years. This period in Philippine history is remembered for the Marcos administration's record of human rights abuses, particularly targeting political opponents, student activists, journalists, religious workers, farmers, and others who fought against the Marcos dictatorship.

Makati was the setting of what is believed to be the single biggest case of involuntary disappearance during martial law – the case of the "Southern Tagalog 10" – ten activists from the nearby Southern Tagalog region, mostly in their twenties, who were abducted in late July 1977 at the Makati Medical Center.

Following the assassination of opposition senator Benigno Aquino Jr. on August 21, 1983, Makati became a nexus for protests against the dictatorship of President Ferdinand Marcos. Known as the Confetti Revolution, the demonstrations held in the central business district were led partly by employees of major corporations based in the area, culminating in the 1986 People Power Revolution that toppled Marcos' 20-year authoritarian regime. His political rival and successor, Corazon Aquino–the wife of the deceased senator Aquino–became the eleventh and first female president of the Philippines. After Mayor Nemesio Yabut succumbed to an illness on February 25, 1986, coinciding with the last day of the People Power Revolution, Aquino appointed Jejomar Binay as acting mayor of Makati two days later; he was subsequently elected as mayor in 1988.

In January 1986, by virtue of Presidential Proclamation No. 2475, s. 1986, the Fort Bonifacio Military Reservation, including the Embo barangays of Cembo, South Cembo, West Rembo, East Rembo, Comembo, Pembo and Pitogo were declared as part of Makati. The proclamation was contested by Taguig because it altered the municipality's boundaries unconstitutionally, which resulted in a three-decade long territorial dispute.

During the 1989 Philippine coup attempt, the Makati central business district was occupied by Reform the Armed Forces Movement forces seeking to overthrow President Corazon Aquino. The resulting standoff lasted from December 2 to 9 and contributed to massive financial losses incurred due to the paralysis in the economic hub.

=== Late 20th and early 21st centuries (1986–present) ===
On January 2, 1995, President Fidel V. Ramos signed Republic Act No. 7854, making Makati the seventh city in Metro Manila. The law was approved by a plebiscite one month later, on February 2, 1995, by majority of voters.

On May 17, 2000, at 5:02 p.m. PHT, Glorietta in Ayala Center was bombed, injuring 13 people. According to local authorities, the homemade bomb originated from the restroom of a restaurant and affected an adjacent video arcade. The bombing was believed to be the precursor of the May 21, 2000 SM Megamall bombing and the Rizal Day bombings. Another explosion occurred in the shopping mall complex on October 19, 2007, when a portion of Glorietta 2 exploded, killing 11 people and injuring more than a hundred. Initially, authorities said that it was caused by a liquefied petroleum gas explosion at a restaurant, but later began investigating the possibility that the explosion may have been a C-4 bomb.

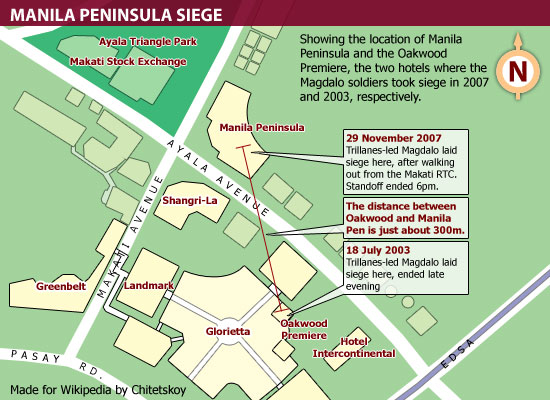
Map of the locations of the Magdalo group mutinies in 2003 and 2007

In July 2003, about 300 defectors of the Armed Forces of the Philippines and the Philippine National Police, known as the Magdalo Group, led by Army Capt. Gerardo Gambala and Navy Lt. Senior Grade Antonio Trillanes IV seized and occupied Oakwood Premier in Glorietta for 20 hours in what became known as the Oakwood mutiny. It is the first mutiny led by Trillanes against the Arroyo administration. The group attempted another unsuccessful rebellion in 2007 which became known as the Manila Peninsula siege.

In January 2011, a bus in Makati was bombed by Abu Sayyaf, killing five. In 2018, the Philippine Stock Exchange left its trading floor in Makati and moved to its new headquarters at the Philippine Stock Exchange Tower in Taguig.

In 2014, former Vice President Jejomar Binay and his son, former Makati Mayor Junjun Binay were involved in a graft case over the construction of the Makati Science High School Building in Cembo. The building was indicated to have cost ₱1.3 billion (US$22.5 million) or ₱72,500 per square meter, when it should have only been worth ₱470 million (US$9.2 million) or ₱25,620 per square meter. In December 2024, however, the Sandiganbayan granted the demurrer and acquitted all the accused, including the Binays, in the case.

Map of Makati and Taguig with disputed territory. Makati subsequently lost in the 2022 Supreme Court ruling, with the entirety of Fort Bonifacio and the Embo barangays declared as part of Taguig.

In April 2022, Makati lost in the three decades-long territorial dispute with Taguig, which was ruled with finality a year later in April 2023. The city was ordered to refrain from exercising jurisdiction over the ten Embo barangays, which were reintegrated to Taguig. Makati lost an estimated 300,000 people from its population following the loss of the Embo barangays. The city also lost its boundaries with Pasig and Pateros, while the city borders of Taguig were extended up to Mandaluyong. In May 2025, the court ordered Makati to cease obstructing Taguig's access to and exclusive full possession of public properties in the Embo barangays covered by Proclamation Nos. 518 and 1916. The order include health centers, multi-purpose buildings, covered courts, parks and other government properties. Taguig reopened the facilities after their takeover and the court granted Taguig's prayer for preliminary injunction, which effectively retains Taguig's possession of the facilities for the continued public services for the Embo barangays.

In the 2023 barangay and Sangguniang Kabataan elections, the Commission on Elections excluded the voters of Embo barangays from Makati, wherein they voted under Taguig instead. Meanwhile, the 2025 local elections is the first time that Makati's 2nd District voters is only composed of three barangays: Guadalupe Nuevo, Guadalupe Viejo, and Pinagkaisahan.

== Geography ==
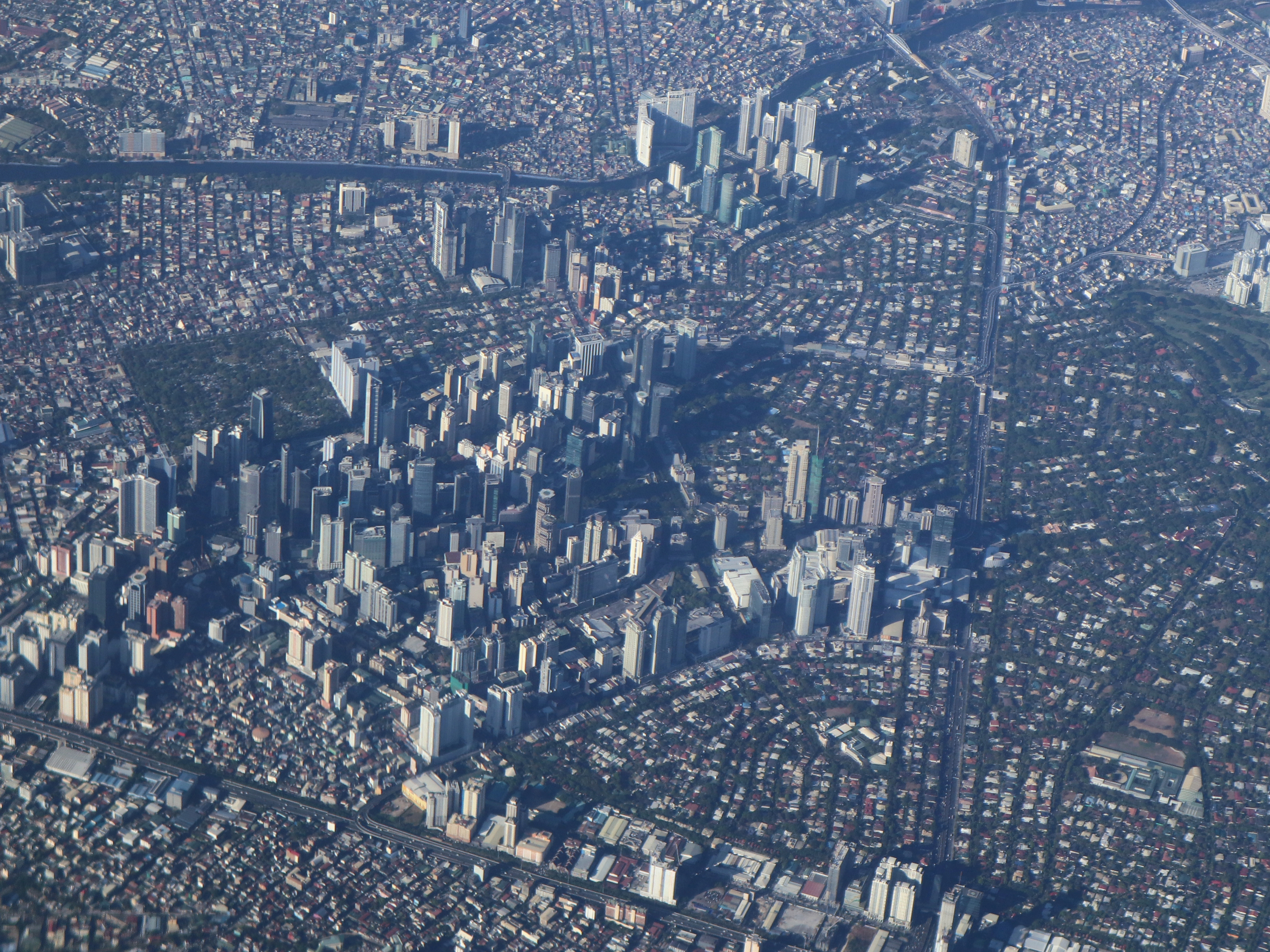
Aerial view of Makati, 2024

Makati is located within the circle of 14′40″ °N and 121′3″ °E right at the center of Metro Manila. The city is bounded on the north by the Pasig River, facing Mandaluyong, on the east by Taguig, on the southwest by Pasay, and on the northwest by the city of Manila. Creeks such as the Estero de Tripa de Gallina mostly on the west, Maricaban Creek on the south, and San Jose Creek on the east, form parts of Makati's city boundary. Makati has a total land area of 21.57 square kilometers (8.33 sq mi). Its territory also surrounds the Manila South Cemetery, an exclave of San Andres district of Manila.

=== Barangays ===
Political map of Makati

Makati is politically subdivided into 23 barangays. These barangays are group into two congressional districts, with each district being represented by a congressman in the House of Representatives. The 1st Congressional District is composed of the barangays straddling EDSA, the barangays to the north and west of them, while excluding Guadalupe Viejo, while the 2nd Congressional District is to the south and east of the 1st District, including the aforementioned barangay. The districts elect the sixteen members of the city council, eight from each of the two councilor districts that are coextensive with the congressional districts.

From 1986 to 2023, Cembo, South Cembo, West Rembo, East Rembo, Comembo, Pembo, Pitogo, Post Proper Northside, Post Proper Southside, and Rizal, which collectively known as the Embo barangays, were declared as part of Makati by virtue of Proclamation No. 2475 issued by President Ferdinand Marcos in 1986. The Proclamation placed Fort Bonifacio and the Embo barangays as part of Makati, where they were represented by Makati's 2nd Congressional District until 2023. They were ceded to Taguig by the 2022 Supreme Court ruling regarding the territorial dispute between Makati and Taguig that was ruled with finality in 2023, declaring that the entirety of Fort Bonifacio, including the Embo barangays, are part of Taguig.

District I
Barangay	Population (2024)		Area^{[a]}		ZIP Code	Established
Bangkal	5.8%	18,013	0.74	0.29	1233	
Bel-Air	12.7%	39,354	1.71	0.66	1209	
Carmona	1.0%	3,034	0.34	0.13	1207	
Dasmariñas	1.4%	4,320	1.90	0.73	1221-1222	
Forbes Park	1.4%	4,183	2.53	0.98	1219-1220	
Kasilawan	1.6%	5,007	0.09	0.035	1206	
La Paz	2.2%	6,682	0.32	0.12	1204	
Magallanes	1.8%	5,473	1.20	0.46	1232	
Olympia	6.1%	19,035	1.20	0.46	1207	
Palanan	3.9%	11,934	0.65	0.25	1235	
Pio del Pilar	17.9%	55,572	1.20	0.46	1230	
Poblacion	5.5%	17,088	1.03	0.40	1210	
San Antonio	5.8%	18,012	0.89	0.34	1203	
San Isidro	2.0%	6,260	0.50	0.19	1234	
San Lorenzo	4.8%	14,793	2.09	0.81	1223	
Santa Cruz	2.2%	6,744	0.47	0.18	1205	
Singkamas	2.4%	7,485	0.13	0.050	1204	
Tejeros	5.2%	16,019	0.29	0.11	1204	
Urdaneta	1.5%	4,720	0.74	0.29	1225	
Valenzuela	1.8%	5,598	0.24	0.093	1208	
District II
Barangay	Population (2024)		Area^{[a]}		ZIP Code	Established
Guadalupe Nuevo	7.0%	21,596	0.57	0.22	1212	
Guadalupe Viejo	4.4%	13,525	0.62	0.24	1211	
Pinagkaisahan	1.7%	5,323	0.16	0.062	1213	
Total		309,770	18.17	7.02		

=== Climate ===
Under the Köppen climate classification system, the city features a tropical monsoon climate. Together with the rest of the Philippines, Makati lies entirely within the tropics. Its proximity to the equator means that the temperature range is very small, rarely going lower than 20 °C (68 °F) or going higher than 38 °C (100 °F). However, humidity levels are usually very high which makes it feel much warmer. It has a distinct, albeit relatively short dry season from January through May, and a relatively lengthy wet season from June through December.

Climate data for Makati
Month	Jan	Feb	Mar	Apr	May	Jun	Jul	Aug	Sep	Oct	Nov	Dec	Year
Mean daily maximum °C (°F)	30 (86)	30 (86)	31 (88)	33 (91)	34 (93)	34 (93)	33 (91)	31 (88)	31 (88)	31 (88)	31 (88)	31 (88)	31.7 (89.1)
Mean daily minimum °C (°F)	21 (70)	21 (70)	21 (70)	22 (72)	23 (73)	24 (75)	24 (75)	24 (75)	24 (75)	24 (75)	23 (73)	22 (72)	22.75 (72.95)
Average precipitation mm (inches)	25.4 (1.00)	25.4 (1.00)	38.1 (1.50)	25.4 (1.00)	38.1 (1.50)	127 (5.0)	254 (10.0)	431.8 (17.00)	406.4 (16.00)	355.6 (14.00)	203.2 (8.00)	152.4 (6.00)	2,082.8 (82.00)
Source: makaticity.com

=== Climate change ===
The Global Climate Risk Index 2021 lists the Philippines as one of countries most affected by catastrophes due to extreme weather events. Makati is a low-lying, coastal city vulnerable to natural calamities intensified by climate change, such as typhoons, floods, and landslides. The city's disaster risk reduction and management office noted a rise in rainfall experienced by the city over the years, particularly during the rainy season.

In August 2022, the city government declared a climate emergency, amid rising sea levels and global temperature changes.

Makati undertakes climate adaptation programs to address vulnerabilities to climate change, which include health services to residents, emergency response, and environmental management and protection. It intends to increase projects to address climate change, including a planned purchase of more electric vehicles, installation of solar panels in public schools and government offices, and improvement of public transport to lessen greenhouse gas emissions.

=== Cityscape ===
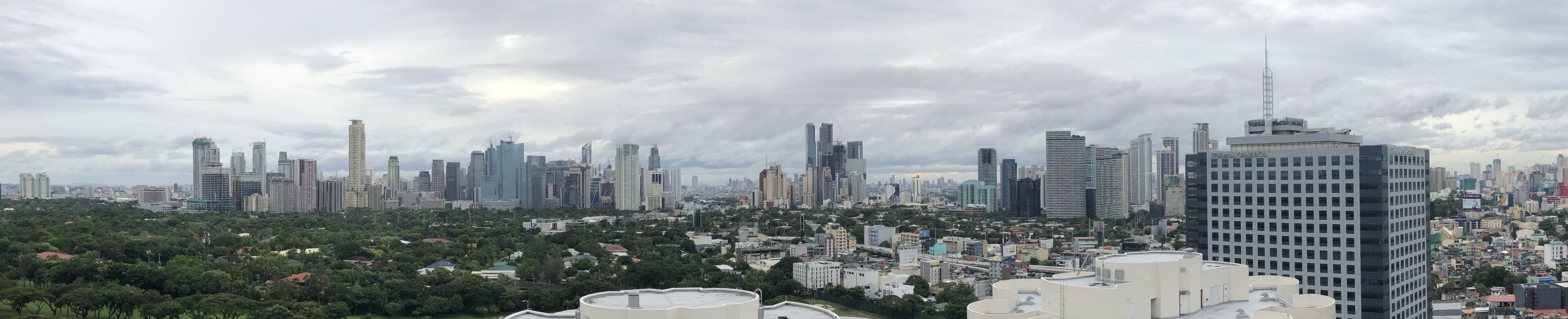
Makati Skyline, August 2020
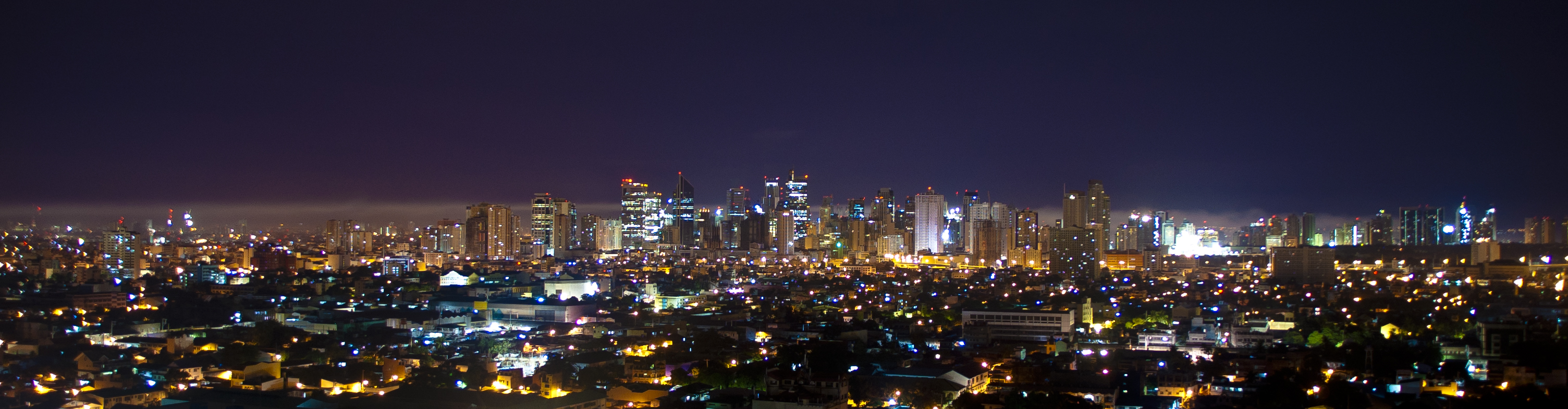
Makati in 2011
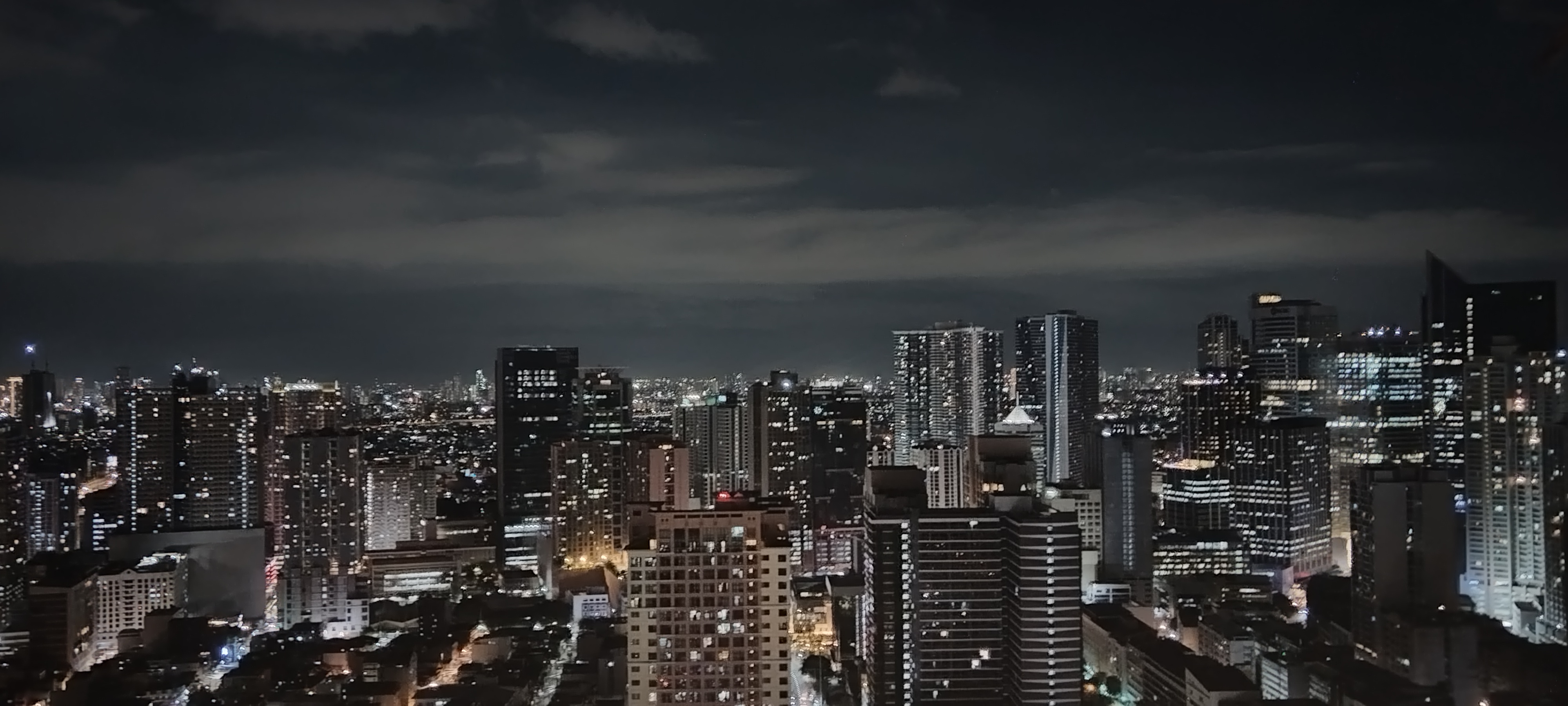
Makati Skyline in night, March 2025

== Demographics ==
Population census of Makati
Year	Pop.	±% p.a.
1903	2,700	—
1918	12,612	+10.82%
1939	33,530	+4.77%
1948	41,335	+2.35%
1960	114,540	+8.86%
1970	264,918	+8.74%
1975	334,448	+4.78%
1980	372,631	+2.18%
1990	453,170	+1.98%
1995	484,176	+1.25%
2000	444,867	−1.80%
2007	567,349	+3.41%
2010	529,039	−2.51%
2015	582,602	+1.85%
2020	629,616	+1.65%
2024	309,770	−15.66%
Source: Philippine Statistics Authority

As of the 2024 census, Makati had a population of 309,770. Makati currently ranks 14th in population size within Metro Manila.

=== Demonym ===
Residents of Makati are widely known as Makatizen.

=== Language ===
Filipino and English are the Philippine official languages. Filipino, a standardized version of Tagalog, is spoken primarily in Metro Manila.

=== Religion ===
A majority of Makati residents identified their religious affiliation as Roman Catholic. Other groups having large number of members in the city are the Church of Jesus Christ of Latter-day Saints, Members Church of God International, Evangelical Christians, Iglesia ni Cristo, Protestantism, Islam, Hinduism, Buddhism and Judaism.

=== Daytime Population ===
Based on the city's Transport and Traffic Improvement Plan 2004–2014, the city's daytime population is estimated to be 3.7 million during weekdays, owing to the large number of people who come to work, do business, or shop.

The daily influx of people into the city provides the skilled labor force that allows Makati to handle the service requirements of domestic as well as international transactions; it also serves as the base of a large consumer market that fuels the retail and service trade in the city. The large tidal population flows exert pressure on Makati's environment, services, and utilities, causing traffic congestions in major roads leading to the city, at the central business district, and the city's periphery.

== Economy ==
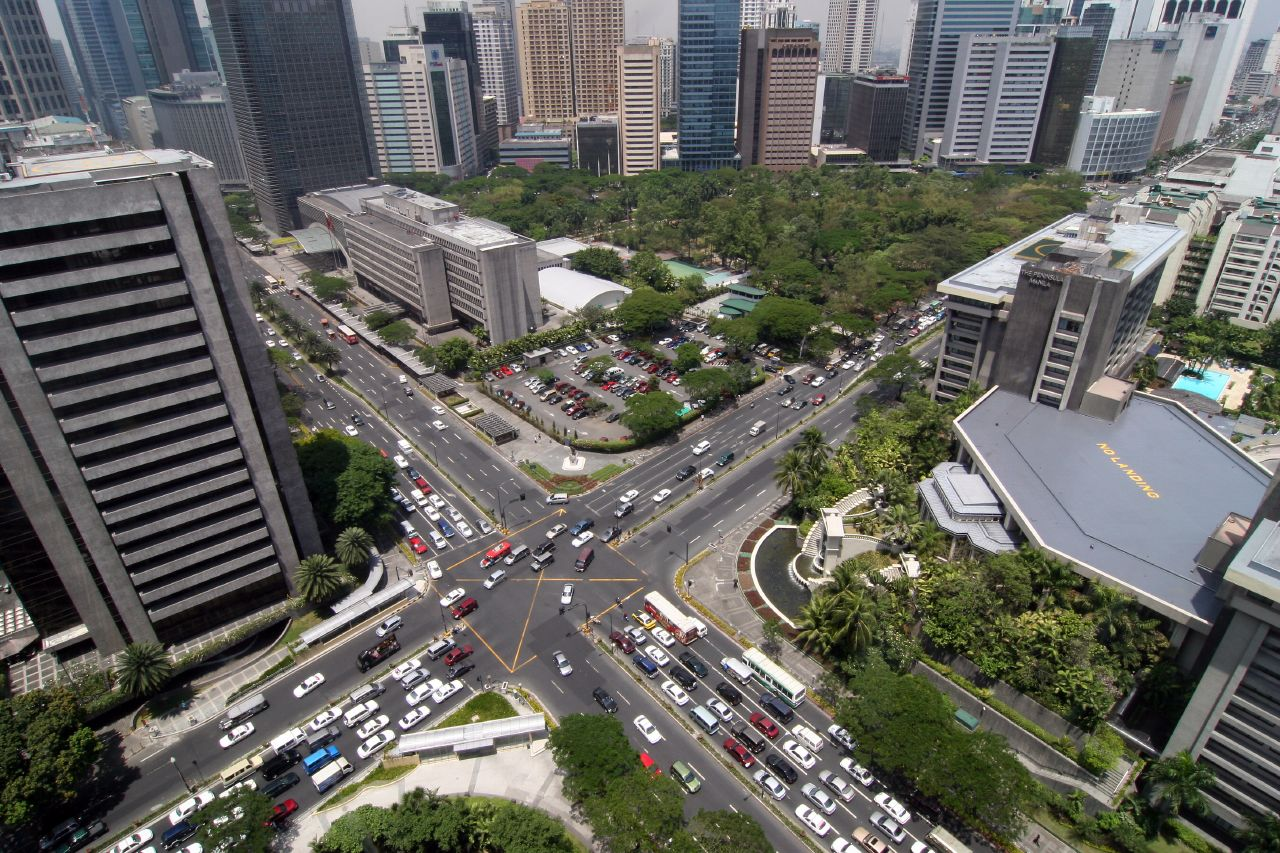
Ayala Triangle area

Makati has the highest per capita GDP of the country at ₱3.9 million (US$63,000). The economy of Makati is diverse and multifaceted. Makati is the home to the Ayala Triangle in the Makati Central Business District, which is home to many multinational companies, banks, and other major businesses. A few upscale boutiques, restaurants, and a park called Ayala Triangle Gardens are also located in the area. The Makati Business Club has over 800 chief executive officers and senior executives, which represents 450 of the country's biggest corporations. In 2024, Makati is the 2nd largest economy in the Philippines, with a 5.4% share to the national gross domestic product totaling ₱1.2 trillion.

The biggest trading floor of the Philippine Stock Exchange used to be situated along the city's Ayala Avenue, before the stock exchange moved their headquarters to the Bonifacio Global City in Taguig. The city has an office space supply of 2.8 million square meters (30 million square feet) as of end-2021, making it a dominant office market in Metro Manila alongside Taguig and Pasig. As of 2023, Taguig had the highest share of existing office supply in Metro Manila at 26 percent, followed by Makati at 20 percent.

Poverty incidence of Makati (%)

Source: Philippine Statistics Authority

Makati is the second top revenue earner in the National Capital Region, following Quezon City at first place. The city has not increased its tax rates since its new Revenue Code took effect in 2006, and has been free of deficit for about three decades.

Most of the tallest skyscrapers in Metro Manila and the Philippines are located in Makati. Among them are the PBCom Tower, Trump Tower Manila and Gramercy Residences in Century City, Discovery Primea, Shang Salcedo Place, and G.T. International Tower. PBCom Tower along Ayala Avenue was the country's tallest office building from 2001 to 2017, with a total ground-to-architectural-top height of 259 meters (850 ft). It was surpassed in 2017 by the Metrobank Center in Taguig with a total architectural height of 318 m (1,043.3 ft).

In addition, Evangelista Street in Barangay Bangkal is known for being the site of automobile repair shops, replacement automobile parts stores, tire and wheel stores, car air-conditioning unit repair shops, and car tint stores, almost similar to Banawe Street in Quezon City.

=== Shopping centers ===
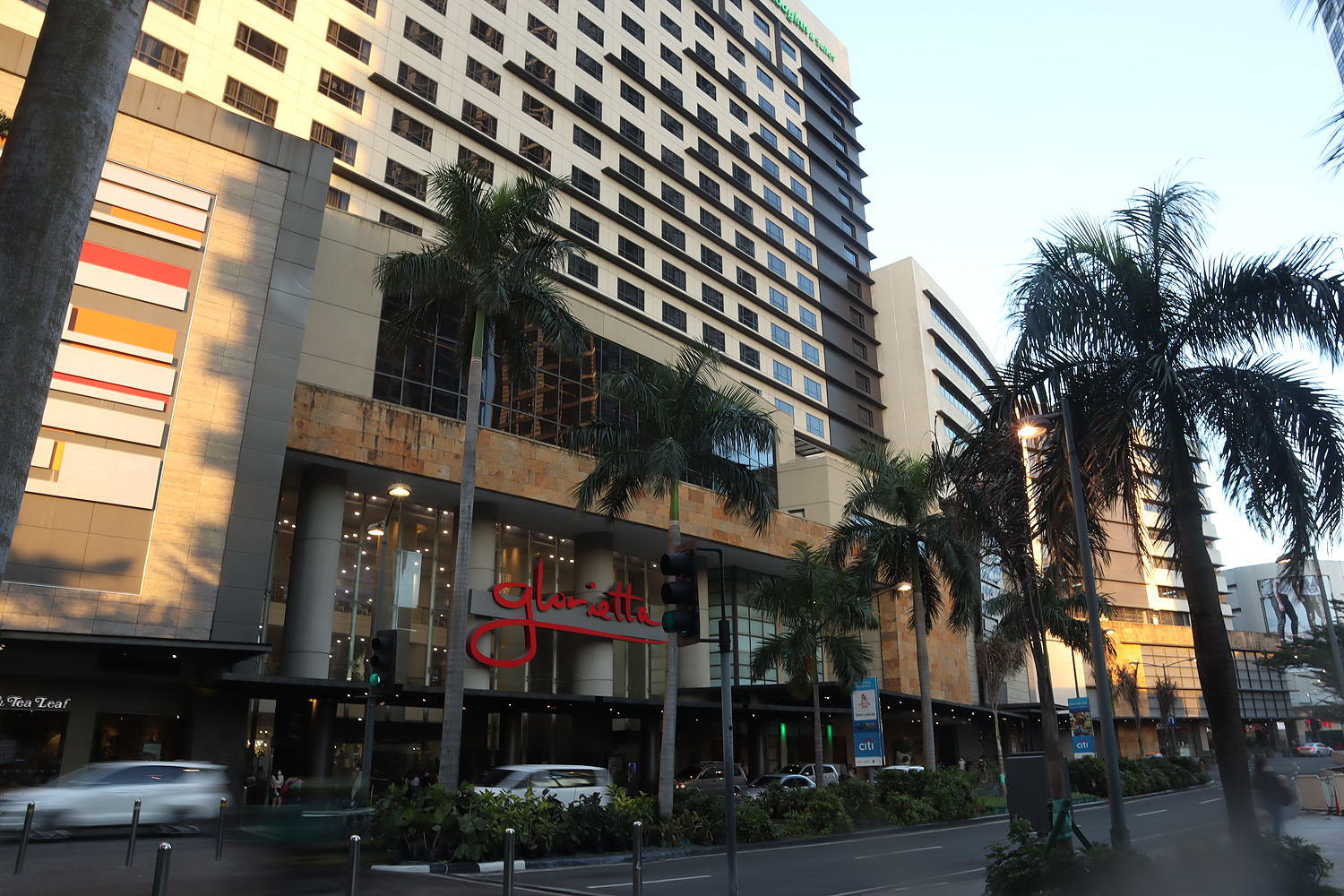
Glorietta at Ayala Center

Power Plant Mall at Rockwell Center

Greenbelt at Ayala Center

Makati is one of the most well-known shopping hubs of Metro Manila. Various shopping centers, offering both international and local retail shops, high-end boutiques, dining outlets and entertainment facilities can be found around the city.

The Ayala Center is a major commercial development operated by Ayala Land located in the Makati CBD. The center is known for its wide array of shopping, entertainment, and cultural offerings, making it a premier shopping and cultural district in the metropolis. It is a vast walkable complex with high-end malls that houses cinemas, local and international shops, homegrown restaurants and international food chains. The shopping malls that are located at the Ayala Center include Greenbelt, Glorietta, Park Square, The Link, and One Ayala by Ayala Malls. The Ayala Center is also home to three department stores, namely: SM Makati, Rustan's, and Landmark.

Other shopping centers in Makati include Power Plant Mall at Rockwell Center, Century City Mall at Century City, Ayala Malls Circuit at Circuit Makati, Cash & Carry Mall, Walter Mart Makati, Makati Central Square (formerly Makati Cinema Square), Guadalupe Commercial Complex, Paseo de Magallanes, and pocket malls at various high-rise residential condominiums or office buildings in the city.

== Government ==
=== Local government ===
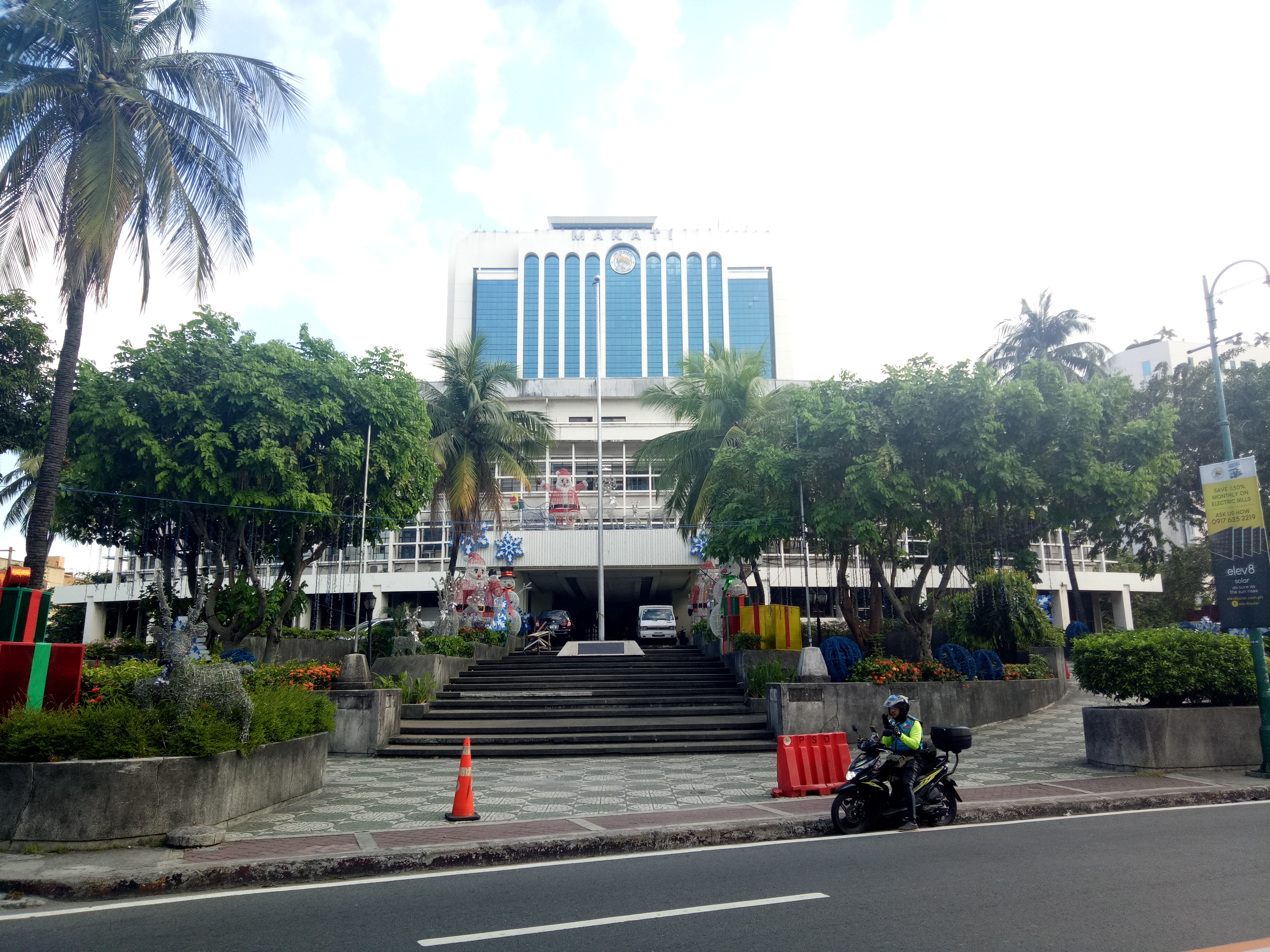
The old (front) and new (back) Makati City Hall

Makati is classified as a highly urbanized city (HUC). The city government is based at the Makati City Hall complex in Poblacion, with the new Makati City Hall building serving as its main seat. The mayor is the chief executive and is a member of the Metro Manila Council. The mayor is assisted by the vice mayor, who presides over a legislative council consisting of 18 members: 8 councilors from the 1st district, 8 councilors from the 2nd district, the President of the Sangguniang Kabataan (Youth Council) Federation representing the youth sector, and the President of the Association of Barangay Chairmen (ABC) as barangay sectoral representative. The council is in charge of creating the city's policies in the form of Ordinances and Resolutions.

The incumbent mayor is Nancy Binay, the daughter of former mayor and former Vice President Jejomar Binay, of the United Nationalist Alliance. Romulo "Kid" Peña Jr., a member of the Nationalist People's Coalition, is the incumbent vice mayor. Current district representatives of the city to the House of Representatives are Monique Lagdameo for the 1st district, and Alden Almario for the 2nd district, both members of the Makatizens United Party.

=== Seal of Makati ===

The current seal of Makati, adopted in August 1995, composes of the old outline map of Makati containing 33 rays, green buildings, a church, and a river. Those were first used on Makati's final municipal seal from 1990 to 1995, following the ratification of the 1987 Constitution of the Philippines.

The map of Makati is in golden yellow color which represents wealth and prosperity. The rays represent the 33 barangays of Makati, which include the 10 Embo barangays ceded to Taguig in 2023, and are described to be "surging forward to a brighter future". The count was 32 when introduced in 1995, until a 33rd ray was added due to the establishment of Barangay Rizal. The buildings are in green, symbolizing life which is described to reflect a "new progressive" Makati. The church represents the oldest church of Makati, the Nuestra Señora de Gracia, which was used by Filipino revolutionaries against the Spaniards in 1896 and the Americans in 1898. The waves represent the tide which came from the phrase "Makati na, Kumakati na" which means ebbing tide in Tagalog. The two five-pointed stars on either side represent the city's legislative districts.

Former municipal seals of Makati

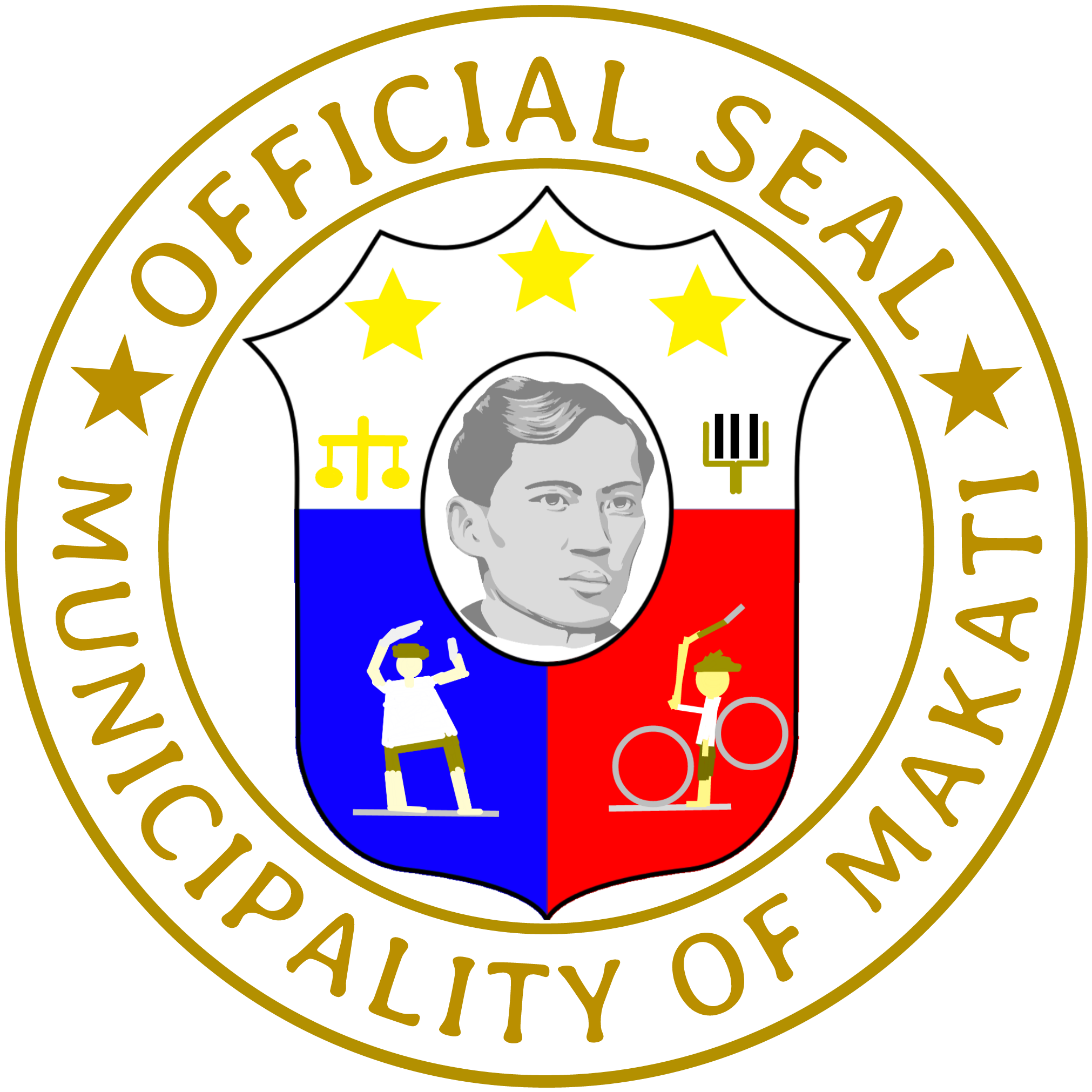
1901–1990

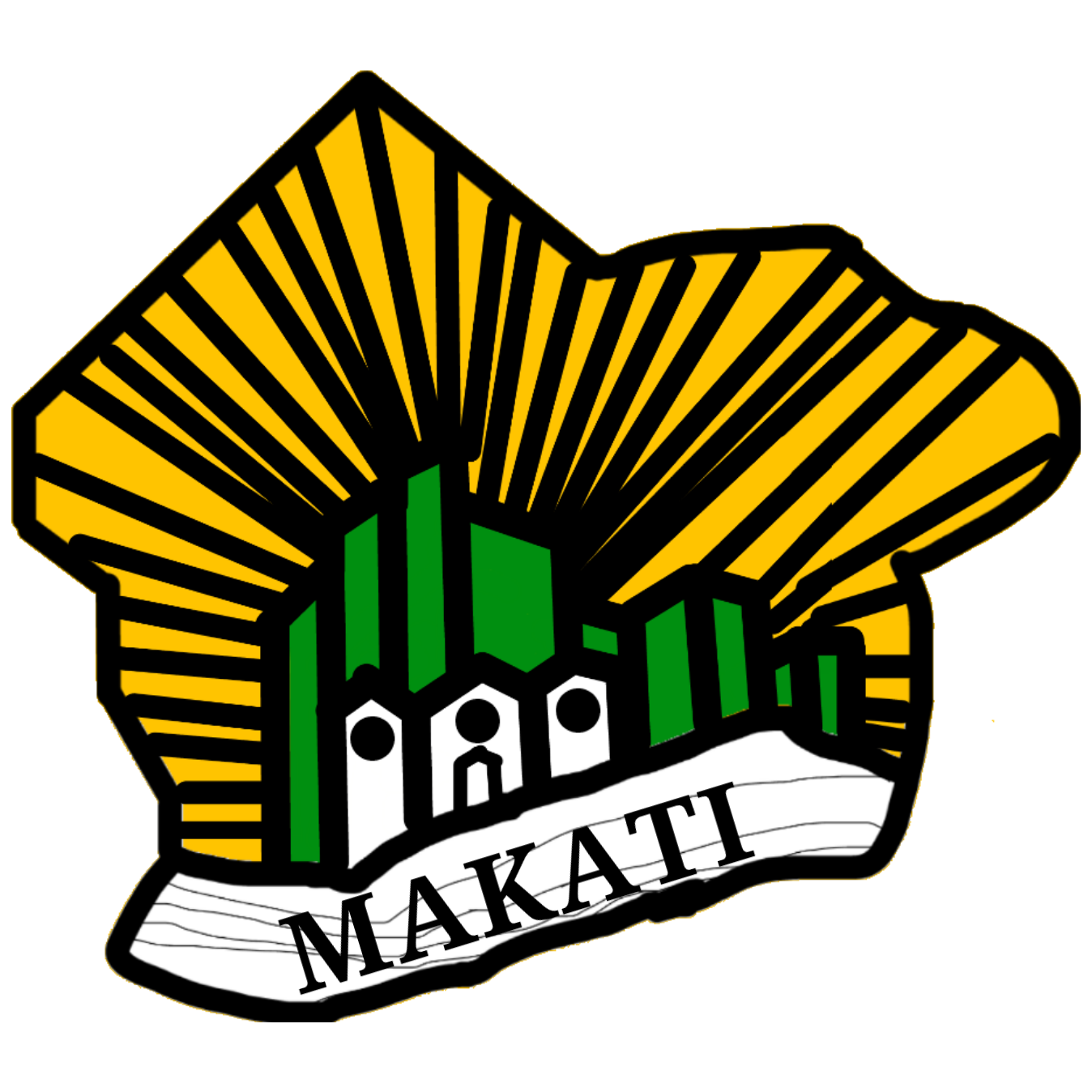
1990–1995

The first municipal seal of Makati, used from 1901 to 1990, features an escutcheon that resembles the Philippine coat of arms with scale of justice, two hands symbolizing welfare, three five-pointed stars representing the three main islands of the Philippines, and the images of José Rizal (as Makati was part of Rizal province until 1975) on the ovoid, Pio del Pilar (a Makati native) on the blue base, and a man holding a bolo with quill and mechanical gear (symbols of industry, labor, and knowledge) on the red base. The hands represent the welfare of the people.

=== Flag of the City of Makati ===
The current flag of Makati, adopted also in August 1995, composes of the Seal of Makati City on a white background. The dimensions of the flag is the similar to the dimensions of the city flags in Metro Manila, which is 3 ft × 6 ft (91 cm × 183 cm). Sizes may vary as the City Government of Makati also uses the 1:2 ratio.

== Culture and sports ==
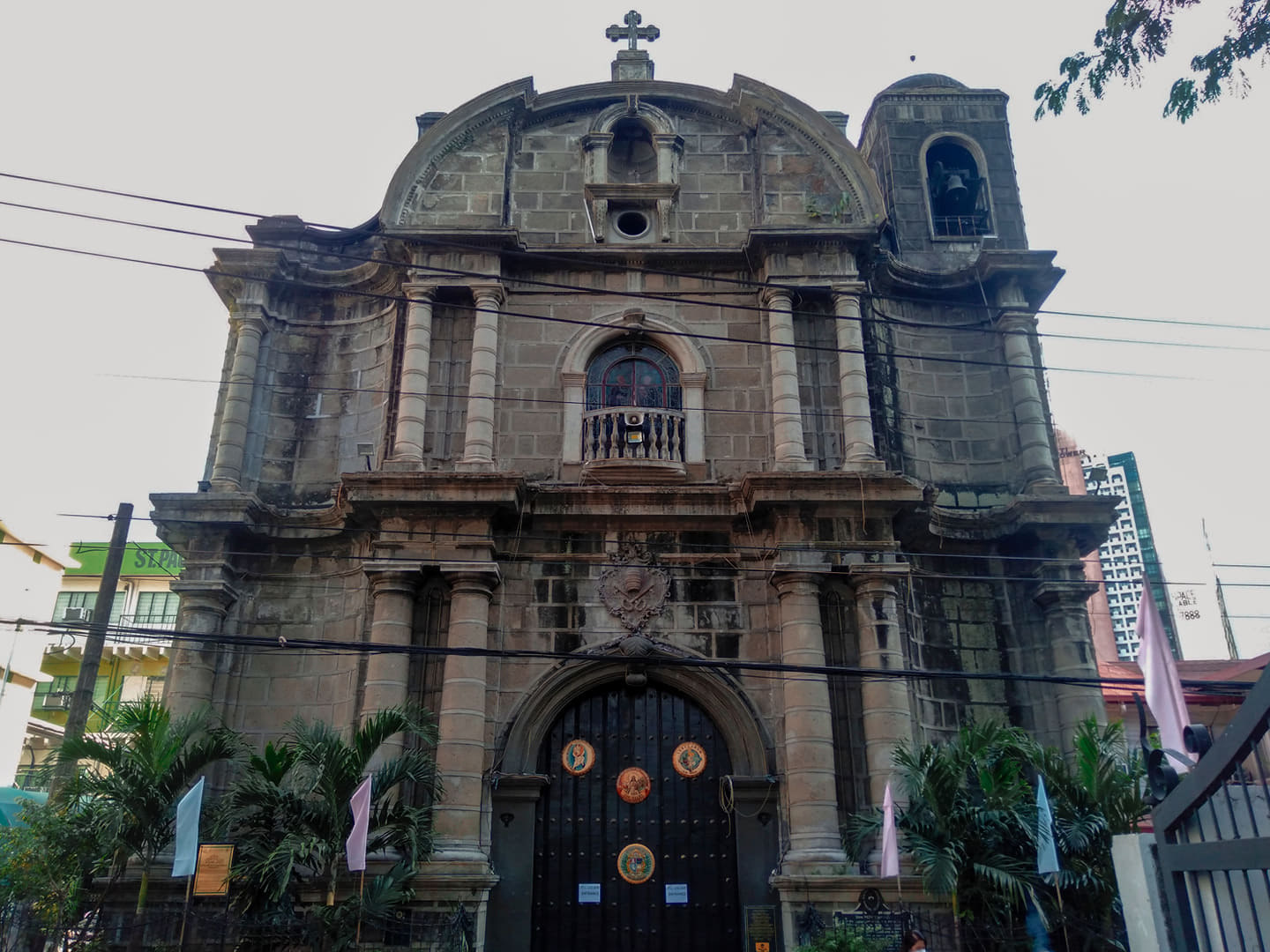
Saints Peter and Paul Parish Church in Poblacion is considered as the mother church of Makati.

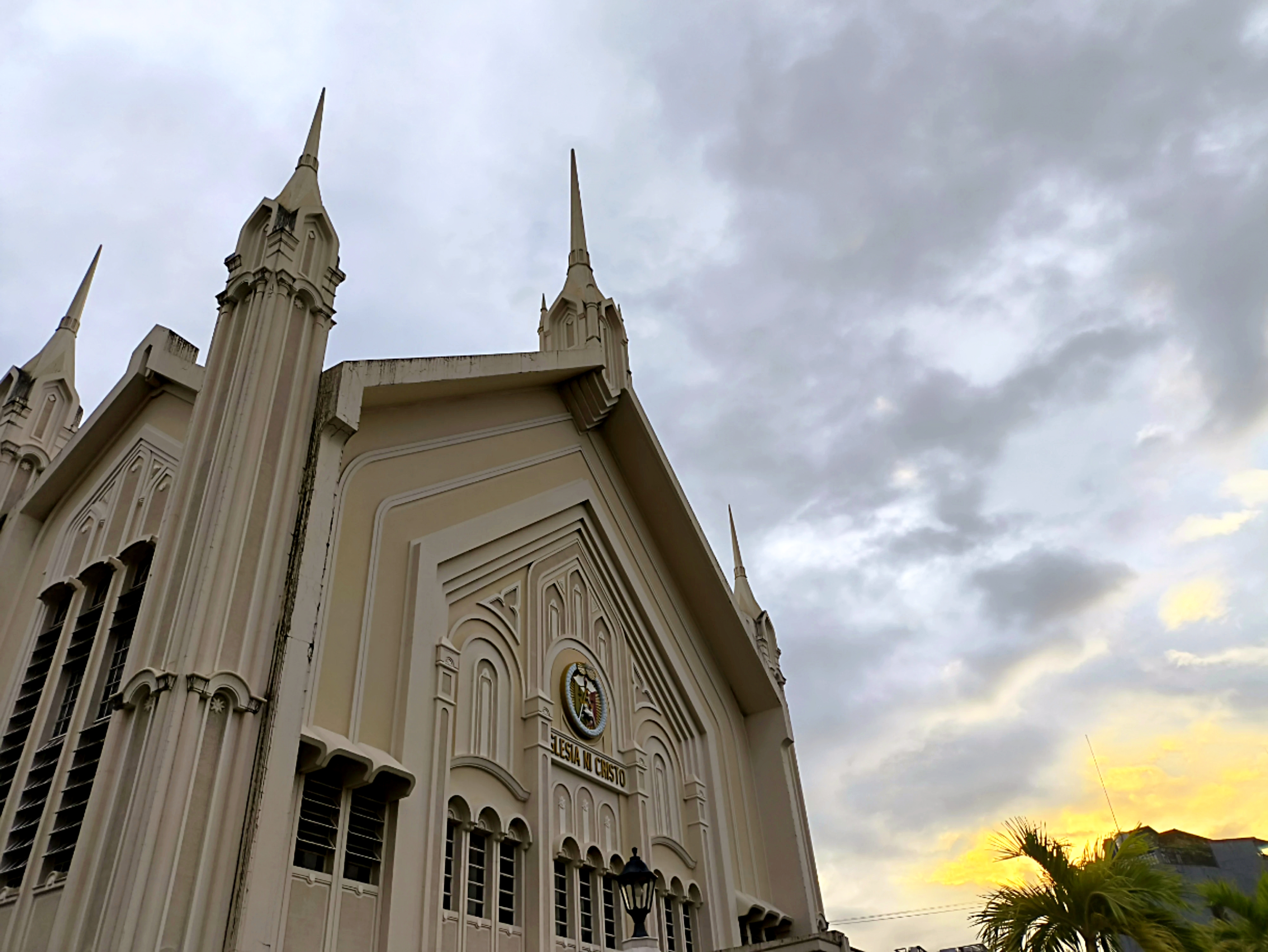
The Iglesia Ni Cristo (INC) Lokal ng Palanan, formerly known as the INC Lokal ng Makati, was formed as a congregation in 1955 by members from INC locales in Pasay and Manila.

The Ayala Museum

Makati is home to a number of fine art museums, colonial-era churches, and recreation areas. Along the south-eastern border of Makati in Forbes Park are the Manila Golf Club and the Manila Polo Club. The Manila Golf Club features an 18-hole golf course. The Manila Polo Club counts among its polo enthusiasts some of the country's wealthiest people. The Makati Sports Club in Salcedo Village is another popular place for sports. The Makati Coliseum is another famous sports landmark in the city, where some of the biggest sports gatherings are held. The city has also hosted some venues of the 1981, 2005 and 2019 Southeast Asian Games.

The city's only professional sports team was the Makati OKBet Kings, which joined the Maharlika Pilipinas Basketball League in its second season.

In the northwest, the Blue Pitch at Circuit Makati is a multi-use stadium, used not just for football games but since 2017 serves as the primary hub of the Philippine-American Football League. The site of Circuit Makati was also previously occupied by the Santa Ana Park, a racetrack whose operations were transferred to Naic, Cavite, in 2009. The University of Makati Stadium, now part of Taguig, was the home venue of Philippines Football League club Kaya F.C.–Makati until the team's move to Iloilo City.

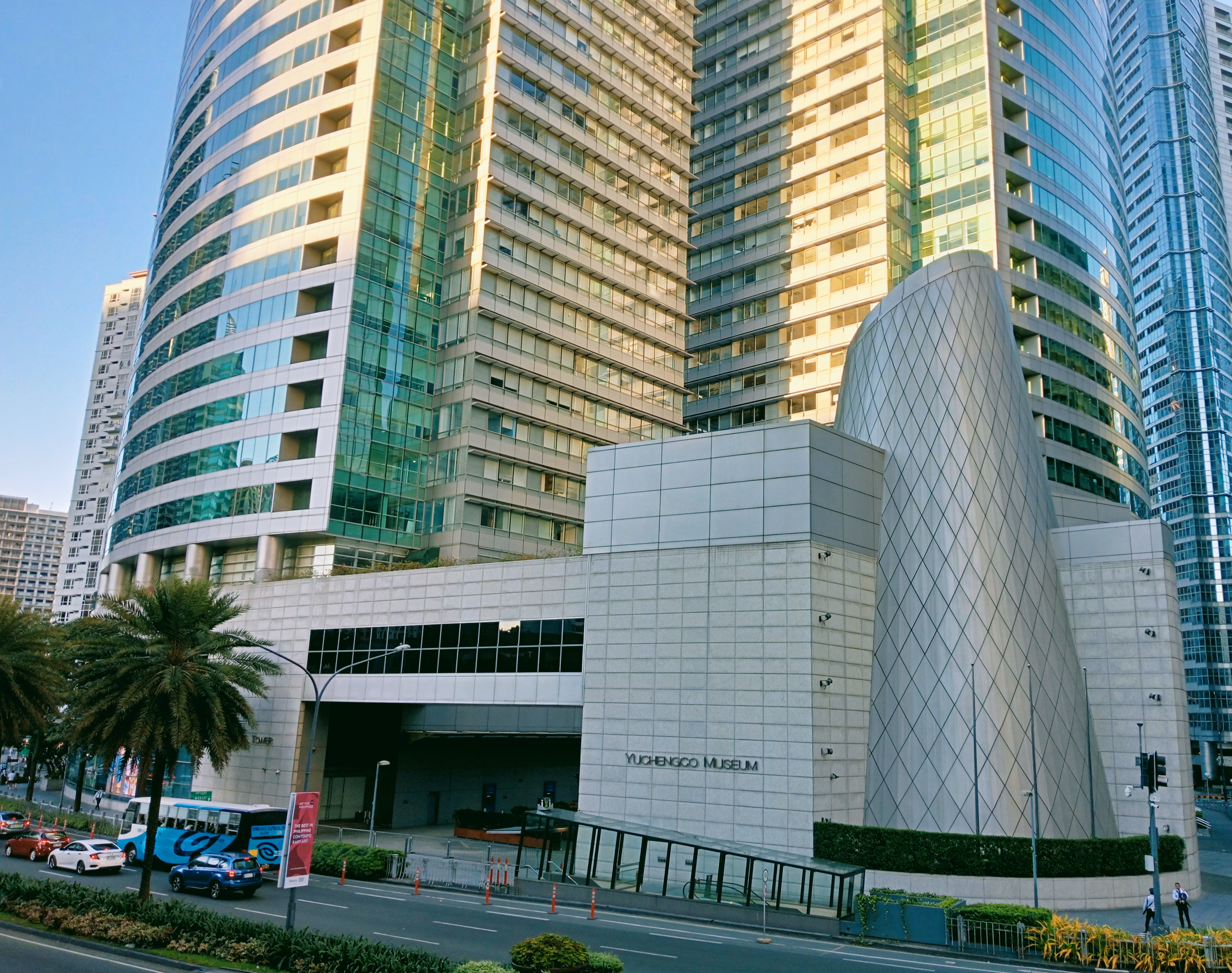
The Yuchengco Museum located within RCBC Plaza

The Ayala Museum is a private fine arts and history museum housing various exhibitions such as the "Gold of Ancestors," an exhibition of more than one thousand golden pre-Hispanic artifacts. Other popular museums also in Makati also include the Yuchengco Museum and the Museo ng Makati.

Makati has several Spanish-era churches, such as the Saints Peter and Paul Parish, Our Lady of Guadalupe Parish, and the Nuestra Señora de Gracia Church (Our Lady of Grace) in the old town. At the Greenbelt Park stands the modern domed Sto. Niño de Paz Greenbelt Chapel. Located in Forbes Park is the Santuario de San Antonio, a popular church for weddings in the Makati area. The National Shrine of the Sacred Heart is located in San Antonio Village. Makati also houses the country's only Jewish synagogue, Beth Yaacov.

There is a red-light district around Padre Burgos Street in Barangay Poblacion.

== Transportation ==
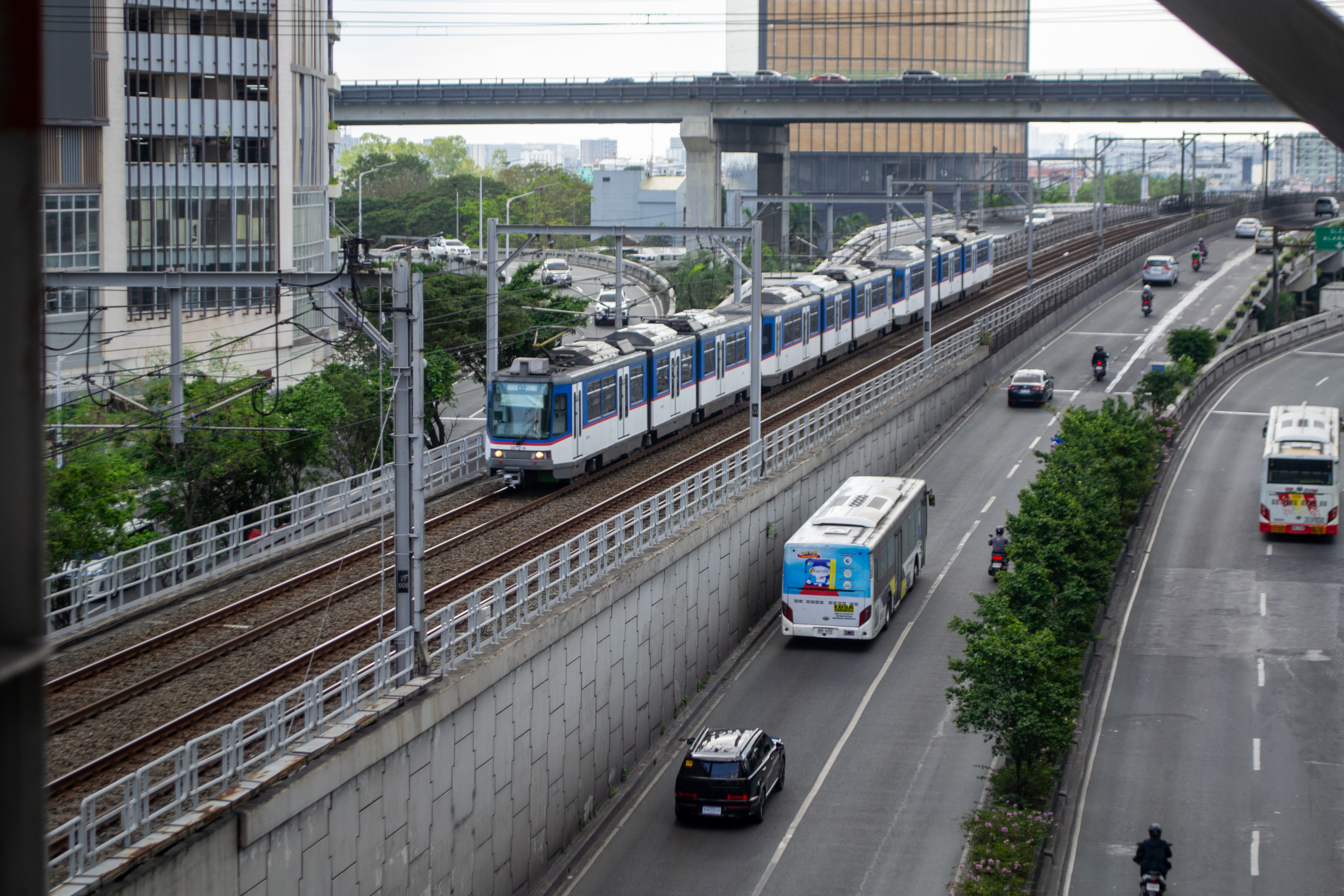
The Magallanes Interchange

=== Roads ===
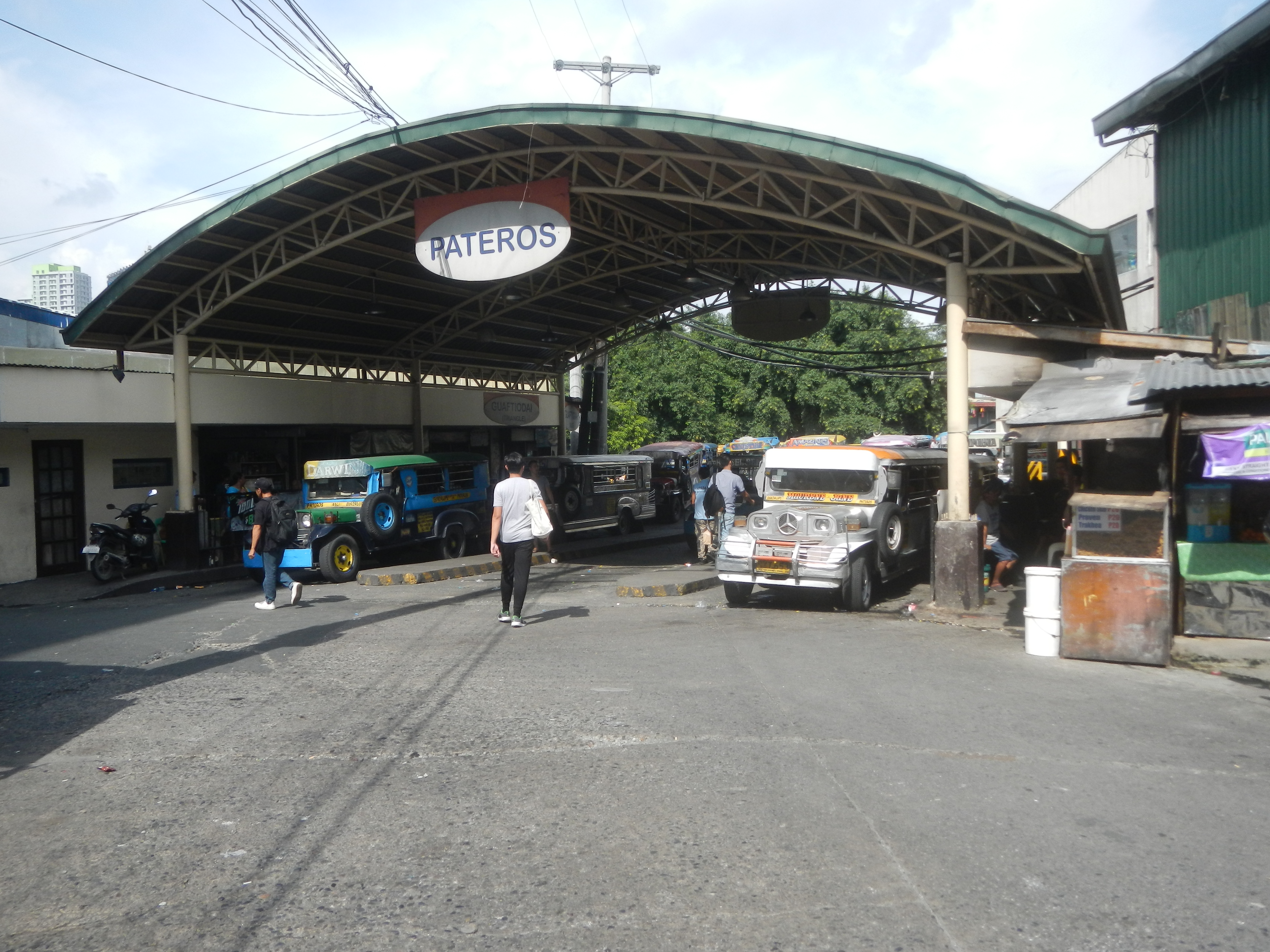
Jeepney terminal in Guadalupe Nuevo

Major roads in Metro Manila surround Makati, such as Epifanio de los Santos Avenue (EDSA), located in the southwestern part of the city, the Osmeña Highway and South Luzon Expressway (SLEX), collectively known as South Superhighway (SSH), and the Skyway, which is built on top of both roads.

Two of Metro Manila's main arteries pass through Makati. The Epifanio de los Santos Avenue (EDSA) pass along the city's southeast part and connects it with the cities of Mandaluyong and Pasay. The South Luzon Expressway (SLEX) starts in southwestern Makati and connects it with southern Metro Manila and Southern Luzon. The Skyway is an elevated expressway that connects with North Luzon Expressway (NLEX) and SLEX, providing residents coming from various parts of Luzon and Northern Metro Manila, a fast way to reach Makati. SLEX and EDSA intersect at the Magallanes Interchange, which is among the most complex systems of elevated roadways in the country.

Makati is known to enforce a significantly stricter implementation of the Unified Vehicular Volume Reduction Program (UVVRP), or Number Coding Scheme, than most other local government units in Metro Manila. Unlike the Metro Manila Development Authority's (MMDA) scheme, which includes "window hours" and covers national roads traversing Makati (i.e., EDSA and Osmeña Highway), No Window Hours is mandated across the city, enforcing a continuous restriction from 7:00 AM to 7:00 PM PHT, Monday to Friday except on holidays. This non-stop ban is aimed at managing severe traffic congestion, with exemptions mainly for senior citizen BluCard holders and official/emergency vehicles.

The areas of Guadalupe and of Ayala Center are considered as major transport hubs. Ayala Center hosts One Ayala, a complex with an intermodal transport hub, and various public transportation stops. The BGC Bus also connects the city to Bonifacio Global City, with a terminal at the McKinley Exchange Corporate Center in Barangay Dasmariñas, near Ayala Center. Provincial and city buses, including Premium Point-to-Point Bus Service, ply the city through EDSA, Osmeña Highway, Kalayaan Avenue, or the central business/financial district towards other parts of Metro Manila and Southern Luzon. Jeepneys ply Makati's inner roads and connect the city to its surrounding towns and cities. Tricycles are also used for shorter distances except at most of the Central Business District, exclusive villages, and some major roads.

The country's first-ever e-jeepney and hybrid bus services were piloted in Makati. The buses are parallel electric hybrids, powered by an electric motor and a Euro 3 diesel motor. The hybrid buses ply the route from Gil Puyat Avenue (Tramo area in Pasay) to Kalayaan Avenue (near C-5 in Taguig), which are considered among the busiest areas, cutting through other major roads like Osmeña Highway; Chino Roces, Ayala and Makati Avenues; Paseo de Roxas and EDSA.

Other major roads in the city include Gil Puyat Avenue, which connects EDSA and SLEX in the north; Ayala Avenue, an important street that runs through the Makati CBD; McKinley Road, which connects the city to Bonifacio Global City; Arnaiz Avenue, which connects the city to Pasay; Osmeña Highway, which connects SLEX to the city of Manila; Makati Avenue, which connects the Makati CBD to Poblacion, also extending north to the Makati–Mandaluyong Bridge; and J. P. Rizal Avenue, the oldest main thoroughfare of Makati which connects it to the cities of Manila and Taguig. At the center of Makati is the Ayala Triangle, a park built on the former Nielson Air Base. As of 2023, Makati has 176.615 kilometers (109.743 mi) of concrete roads, and 105.264 kilometers (65.408 mi) of asphalt roads.

=== Railways ===
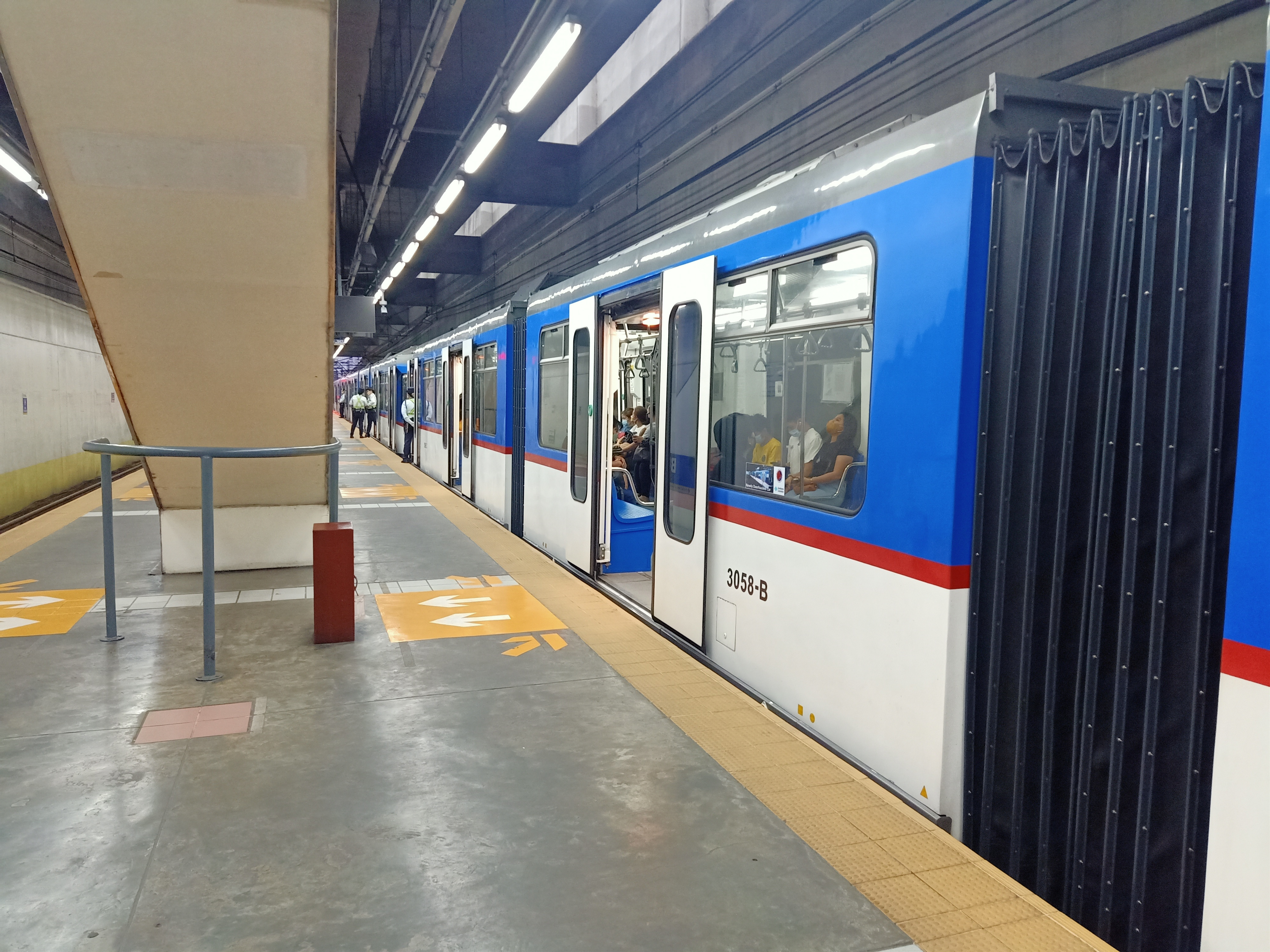
An MRT Line 3 train at Buendia station

The MRT Line 3 on EDSA has four stations located in Makati: Guadalupe, Buendia, Ayala and Magallanes. The city was formerly served by the PNR Metro Commuter Line, whose operations were discontinued and it will be superseded by the North–South Commuter Railway, which will have two stations in the city: Buendia and EDSA.

In 2013, the National Economic and Development Authority (NEDA) worked on a feasibility study for a monorail project which will be 12.56-kilometer (7.80 mi) long. It plans to connect Makati, Bonifacio Global City and Pasay through MRT Line 3, as well as the Ninoy Aquino International Airport. The present alignment being considered starts from the Guadalupe MRT station, enters Bonifacio Global City through the north gate and ends at Ninoy Aquino International Airport Terminal 3. The SkyTrain is also proposed to be built in Makati and Taguig.

In 2015, NEDA approved the Public-Private Partnership project for the Makati-Pasay-Taguig Mass Transit System Loop which will have stations at key points in Makati. The project was later shelved and partially revived in 2018 as the Makati Intra-City Subway which inherits most of the stations in Makati. Instead of a national government project, it became a project of the Makati City Government and the line now only traverses within the city limits. Later on, the Subway project was later stalled in 2023 due to the transfer of the Embo barangays to Taguig, which won the territorial dispute with Makati. The Embo area was planned to contain its depot and two stations.

=== Water ===
The Pasig River Ferry Service has one station in Makati located in barangay Valenzuela. A separate, regular service plies between the Casa Hacienda Park in Poblacion and barangay Hulo in Mandaluyong.

== Education ==
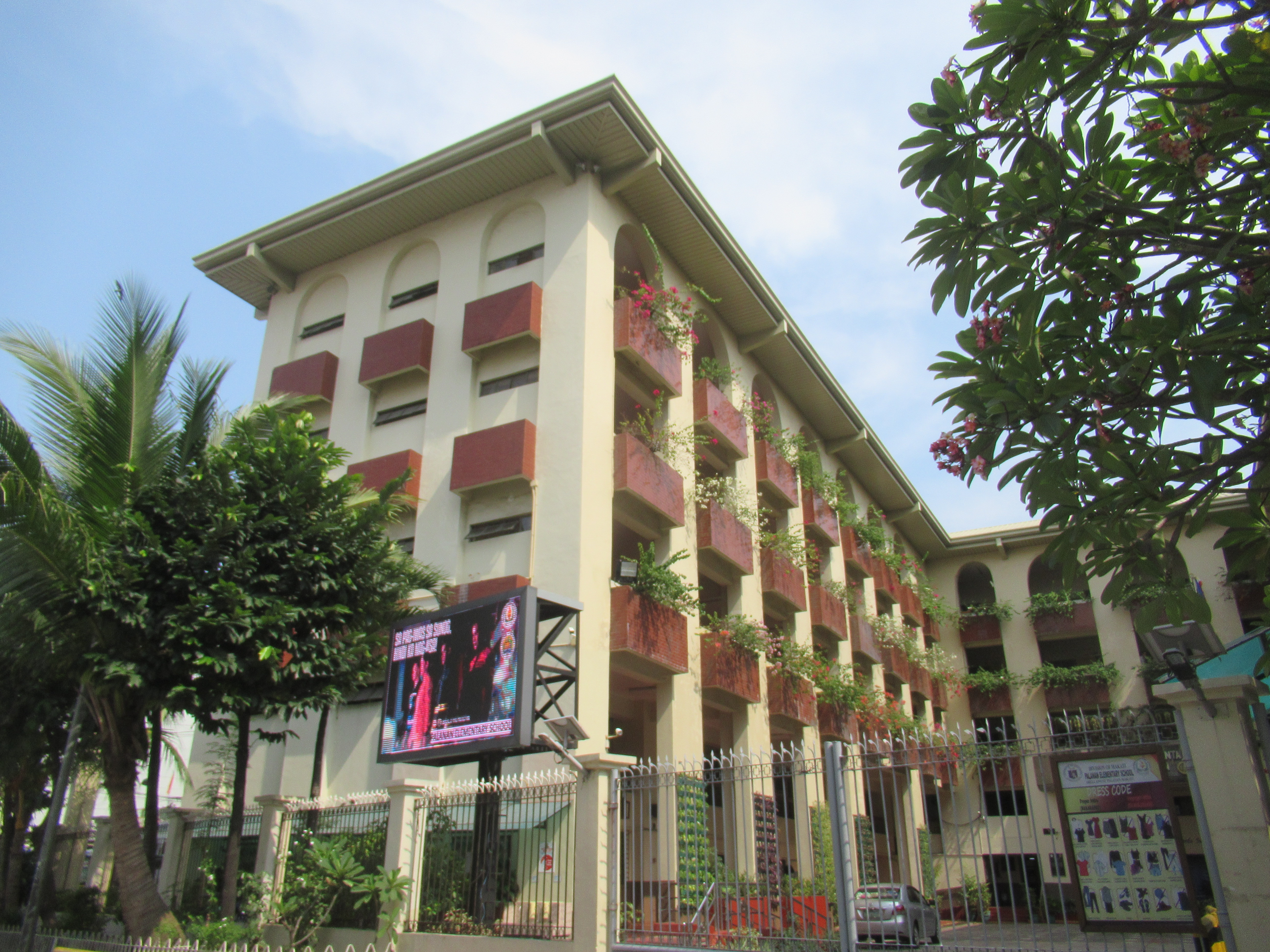
Palanan Elementary School

The University of Makati, a public, non-profit university, is the city's flagship university located in West Rembo, its former barangay that is now part of Taguig. Other institutions of higher education located in the city include the Asian Institute of Management (AIM), iAcademy, Asian Seminary of Christian Ministries (ASCM), Don Bosco Technical Institute of Makati, Assumption College San Lorenzo, Saint Paul College of Makati, Our Lady of Guadalupe Minor Seminary, San Carlos Seminary, and Asia Pacific College.

Several higher education institutions headquartered outside the city have established branch or satellite campuses in Makati. These include the Ateneo de Manila University (Ateneo Professional Schools), De La Salle University, Far Eastern University, Mapúa University, Lyceum of the Philippines University, Centro Escolar University, and AMA Computer College Colleges, among others.

Australian Catholic University, a foreign institution, maintains an extension program in Makati.

As of 2024, the Schools Division Office (SDO) of Makati City oversees 23 public schools: 16 elementary schools and 7 high schools. In 2023, as a result of the Makati–Taguig boundary dispute ruling, 14 public elementary and high schools, including the Makati Science High School, were transferred from the SDO of Makati City to the SDO of Taguig City and Pateros. Makati later appealed to the national Department of Education to retain the management of Makati Science High School, Fort Bonifacio Elementary School, and Fort Bonifacio High School, but the city's appeal was denied, leaving the city without a science high school.

Rafael Palma Elementary School, which is under the jurisdiction of the neighboring city of Manila's Division of City Schools, is located in Barangay La Paz, near the Makati–Manila boundary.

== Notable persons ==
- Bimby Yap, television host, actor
- Patrick Garcia, actor, model
- Cheska Garcia, actress, model
- Enrico Cuenca, actor
- Khimo Gumatay, singer, songwriter
- Ryan Recto, congressman
- Andres Muhlach, actor
- Atasha Muhlach, actress
- Mikey Arroyo, congressman
- Bobby Andrews, actor, TV host
- Sheryl Cruz, actress, opm singer
- Donita Nose, stand-up comedian; comedian
- Bubbles Paraiso, actress
- Mark Leviste, ex politician
- Leandro Leviste, congressman
- Gabbi Garcia, actress, socialite celebrity
- Marco Gumabao, actor
- Pío del Pilar, revolutionary general
- Jejomar Binay, former vice president of the Philippines
- Elenita Binay, physician, former mayor
- Nancy Binay, former senator and incumbent mayor
- Abigail Binay, former city mayor and 2025 senatorial candidate
- Jejomar Binay Jr., former politician
- Michelle Dee, actress
- Vhong Navarro, TV host, actor and dancer
- Ciara Sotto, actress
- Julia Clarete, actress
- China Roces, actress
- Jhong Hilario, actor, dancer, TV host and former 1st district councilor
- Jun Lana, film director
- Teodoro Locsin Jr., journalist, lawyer, diplomat and former 1st district representative
- Monsour del Rosario, actor, athlete and former 1st district representative
- Eddie Ilarde, radio and TV host, former senator and former Rizal 1st district representative
- Joker Arroyo, lawyer, former 1st district representative and former senator
- Agapito Aquino, former senator and former 2nd district representative
- Rico J. Puno, singer and former 1st district councilor
- Chiquito, actor and former vice mayor
- Sandro Reyes, Philippines national football team player
- Rhian Ramos, actress
- Mike Arroyo, former first gentleman
- Solenn Heussaff, vj, actress, socialite and model
- Bela Padilla, actress
- Heaven Peralejo, actress
- Albie Casiño, actor
- CJ Tañedo, painter
- Bettina Carlos, former actress
- Migz Zubiri, politician and businessperson
- Freddie Elizalde, Filipino former swimmer and businessman
- Tim Tebow, Heisman Trophy winner and former NFL quarterback, born in Makati

== National and international relations ==
=== Diplomatic missions ===
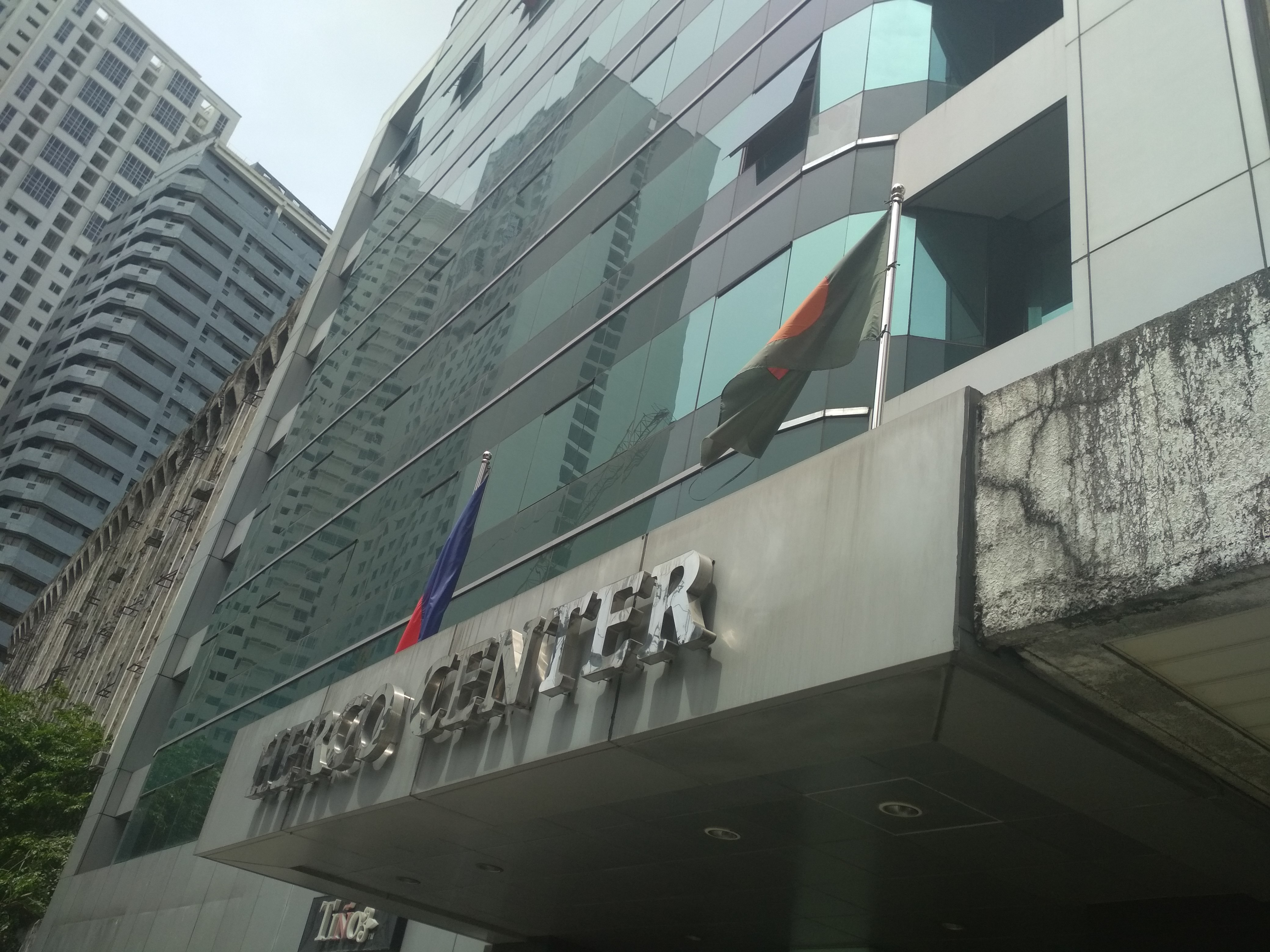
The Herco Center houses the Embassy of the People's Republic of Bangladesh in Manila.

Most of the diplomatic missions to Manila by foreign countries in the Philippines have their chanceries located in Makati:

- Angola
- Argentina
- Australia
- Austria
- Bangladesh
- Botswana (Honorary Consulate)
- Belgium
- Brazil
- Brunei
- Bulgaria (Honorary Consulate)
- Bahrain (Honorary Consulate)
- Cambodia
- Canada
- Chile
- China
- Czech Republic
- Cuba
- Egypt
- Ecuador (Consulate General)
- European Union (Delegation)
- Finland
- France
- Germany
- Greece
- India
- Indonesia
- Iran
- Iraq
- Ireland
- Israel
- Italy (Relocated in Taguig)
- Laos
- Lebanon
- Libya
- Morocco
- Mexico
- Malta
- Malaysia
- Myanmar
- Netherlands
- New Zealand
- Nigeria
- Niger
- Norway
- Pakistan
- Panama
- Papua New Guinea
- Peru
- Palestine
- Portugal
- Qatar
- Romania
- Russia
- Saudi Arabia
- South Africa
- Singapore
- Spain
- Sri Lanka
- Sweden
- Switzerland
- Syria (Honorary Consulate)
- Thailand
- Turkey
- Taiwan (Representative Office)
- United Arab Emirates
- Ukraine (Honorary Consulate)
- Uruguay
- Venezuela

=== Sister cities ===
International
- Casablanca, Morocco
- Cluj-Napoca, Romania
- Los Angeles, United States
- Ramapo, New York, United States
- Taichung, Taiwan
- Vladivostok, Russia

Domestic
- Alabel, Sarangani
- City of Batac, Ilocos Norte
- Bayugan
- San Pedro, Laguna
- Biñan
- Mogpog, Marinduque
- Iloilo City
- Bacolod
- Dumaguete
- Tayabas
- Santiago
- Tagum
- Vigan
- Zamboanga City

== Hospitals ==
- Ospital ng Makati
- Makati Life Medical Center
- Makati Medical Center

== See also ==
- Greater Manila Area
- List of renamed cities and municipalities in the Philippines
- Tourism in Manila
