= Green Frog Hybrid Buses =

Bus company in the Philippines

Green Frog Zero Emissions Transport Corp.
- Founded: 2012; 14 years ago
- Headquarters: Apelo Cruz Extension, Malibay, Pasay
- Service area: PITX - MOA - Buendia- Kalayaan Avenue - BGC
- Service type: City Operation
- Fleet: 16 Buses
- Operator: Green Frog Transport Corp.
- Website: Green Frog Hybrid Buses on Facebook

Green Frog Zero Emissions Transport Corp., also known as Green Frog Transport Corp. or simply Green Frog, is an intercity bus company in the Philippines that introduced the first hybrid buses in the country.

== History ==
Company founder Philip Apostol and associates conceived the idea of Green Frog in March 2012 with the aim of safe, comfortable, reliable, environment friendly and sustainable public transportation.

Green Frog rolled out the pilot project on May 15, 2013 with 2 hybrid buses plying the route of Gil Puyat Station in Pasay to C-5/Buting via Buendia and Kalayaan in Makati and vice versa. On November 14, 2014, the route extension to SM Mall of Asia in Pasay was approved by the LTFRB. Then in March 2021, LTFRB approved the route extension to PITX in order to serve the commuters from the provinces of Cavite, Batangas and Laguna. From PITX, these commuters will only have one seamless, comfortable, environment friend ride to the CBDs of Pasay, Makati and BGC.

== Fleet ==
In 2013, Green Frog was the first city bus company in the Philippines to operate two-door, low floor Euro 4 compliant hybrid buses equipped with GPS tracking system, CCTVs for security, and the Tap Card payment system. Now, the DOTR has mandated that all city buses look and are equipped just like Green Frog.

Units

Zhongtong Bus

- LCK6101HEV “Fashion Hybrid”

Sunlong Bus

- SLK6129

== Operation ==
Green Frog buses currently traverse the three Central Business Districts of Pasay, Makati and Taguig (BGC) beginning from the Pasay Central Business District through Makati Central Business District and to Kalayaan along the Bonifacio Global City area and back. By 2025, the company plans on expanding the route further to Kalayaan Ave. Terminal as to serve the passengers of the Metro Manila Subway Line 9.

1. PITX
2. Ayala Malls Manila Bay
3. Bradco Avenue (DFA)
4. SM Mall of Asia
5. Seaside Boulevard
6. Harrison Avenue
7. Leveriza Street
8. Taft Avenue
9. Tramo Street
10. Bautista Street
11. Filmore Street
12. Osmeña Highway
13. Chino Roces Avenue
14. Ayala Avenue (Makati Medical Center)
15. Ayala Avenue (RCBC Plaza)
16. Reposo Street
17. Makati Avenue
18. Paseo de Roxas
19. EDSA (before Kalayaan Flyover, in front of Urdaneta Village (East Gate)
20. Palawan Street
21. Sgt. Fabian Yabut Circle
22. Commercio Street
23. 11th Avenue (Uptown Mall)
24. C-5–Kalayaan Interchange

The buses cater to the needs of passengers traveling to and from Bay City, Makati Central Business District and Bonifacio Global City.

== See also ==
- List of bus companies of the Philippines
