= V Corporate Center =

Coordinates: 14.560345°N 121.024789°E

V Corporate Centre is a 12-storey building located in Makati, Philippines. It was developed by Vita Realty Corp and has a typical floor area of 1,100 square meters (12,000 sq ft). It is one of the most technologically advanced buildings in the Philippines.

== Location ==
V Corporate Centre is located in Salcedo Village, Barangay Bel-Air, Makati.
