= Kalayaan Avenue =

Major thoroughfare in Metro Manila, Philippines

Coordinates: 14°33′42″N 121°1′58″E

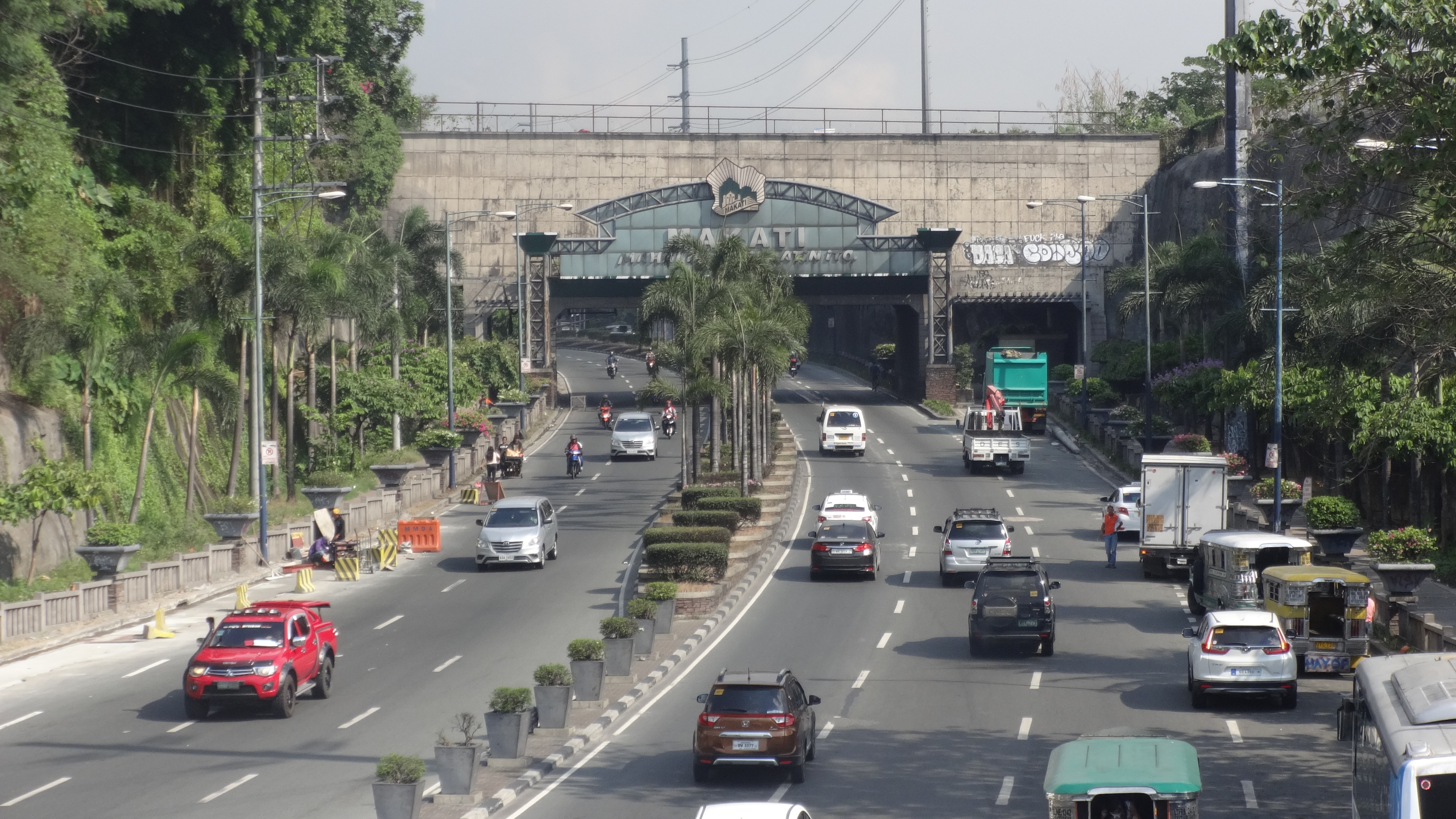
- Kalayaan Avenue looking west from C-5 Road in East Rembo, Taguig
- Interactive map of Kalayaan Avenue
- Former names: Pasig Line Street; Imelda Avenue
- Length: 6.3 km (3.9 mi)
- Component highways: N190 from EDSA to J.P. Rizal Avenue Extension
- Location: Makati and Taguig
- West end: Zobel Roxas Street in Makati–Manila boundary
- Major junctions: Chino Roces Avenue; South Avenue; Nicanor Garcia Street; Makati Avenue; Rockwell Drive; – – Bel-Air Village – –: AH26 (EDSA); 32nd Street; 8th Avenue; N11 (Carlos P. Garcia Avenue)
- East end: J.P. Rizal Extension in Taguig

Kalayaan Avenue is a major east–west route in Makati and Taguig, Metro Manila, Philippines. For most of its length, it runs parallel to J. P. Rizal Avenue to the north from East Rembo near Fort Bonifacio to Barangay Singkamas by the border with Santa Ana, Manila. It is interrupted by Bel-Air Village between Rockwell Drive and Epifanio de los Santos Avenue (EDSA). The avenue east of EDSA is designated as a component of National Route 190 of the Philippine highway network.

Previously, it was part of the Radial Road 4, which is currently designated to J. P. Rizal Avenue.

== History ==
Kalayaan Avenue was formerly called Pasig Line Street as it mostly followed the defunct Paco–Pasig tram line of the Manila Electric Railway (operated by Meralco) for most of its length; the street in the district of San Andres in Manila still bears that name. The line was built in 1908 but was heavily damaged during World War II. Subsequent development of the Bel-Air Village by Ayala Corporation in 1957 has led to the closure of a segment of Pasig Line west of EDSA. During the term of President Ferdinand Marcos, the road was improved and was renamed Imelda Avenue after his wife and first lady, Imelda Marcos.

In 1978, the feasibility study conducted by the Japan International Cooperation Agency of the road was conducted, a 4-kilometer (2.5 mi) route named Radial Road 4 (R-4), spanning from EDSA in Makati to Juan Luna (now R. Jabson) in Pasig. It was planned to occupy the West Rembo portion of J.P. Rizal Extension (also known as Guadalupe–Pateros Road) but was realigned to follow most of the former Paco–Pasig tram line south of the road extension. However, the segment of a highway between a road that is formerly named Imelda Avenue and J.P. Rizal Extension was only completed in 1994.

Following the overthrow of the Marcos regime, the Makati local government renamed the avenue to Kalayaan (Filipino for "freedom"). From 1999 to 2000, the Kalayaan Flyover was constructed on the eastern portion of the avenue, eventually connecting it with Gil Puyat Avenue. In 2014, under the Roadmap for Transport Infrastructure Development for Metro Manila and Its Surrounding Areas (Region III & Region IV-A; also known as the Metro Manila Dream Plan), the JICA study proposes a dual 2-lane elevated expressway from the intersection of Roxas Boulevard and Gil Puyat Avenue to the intersection of C-5 and this road for about 9.3 kilometers (5.8 mi). The R-4 designation was later removed from the avenue.

== Route description ==
=== West Kalayaan ===
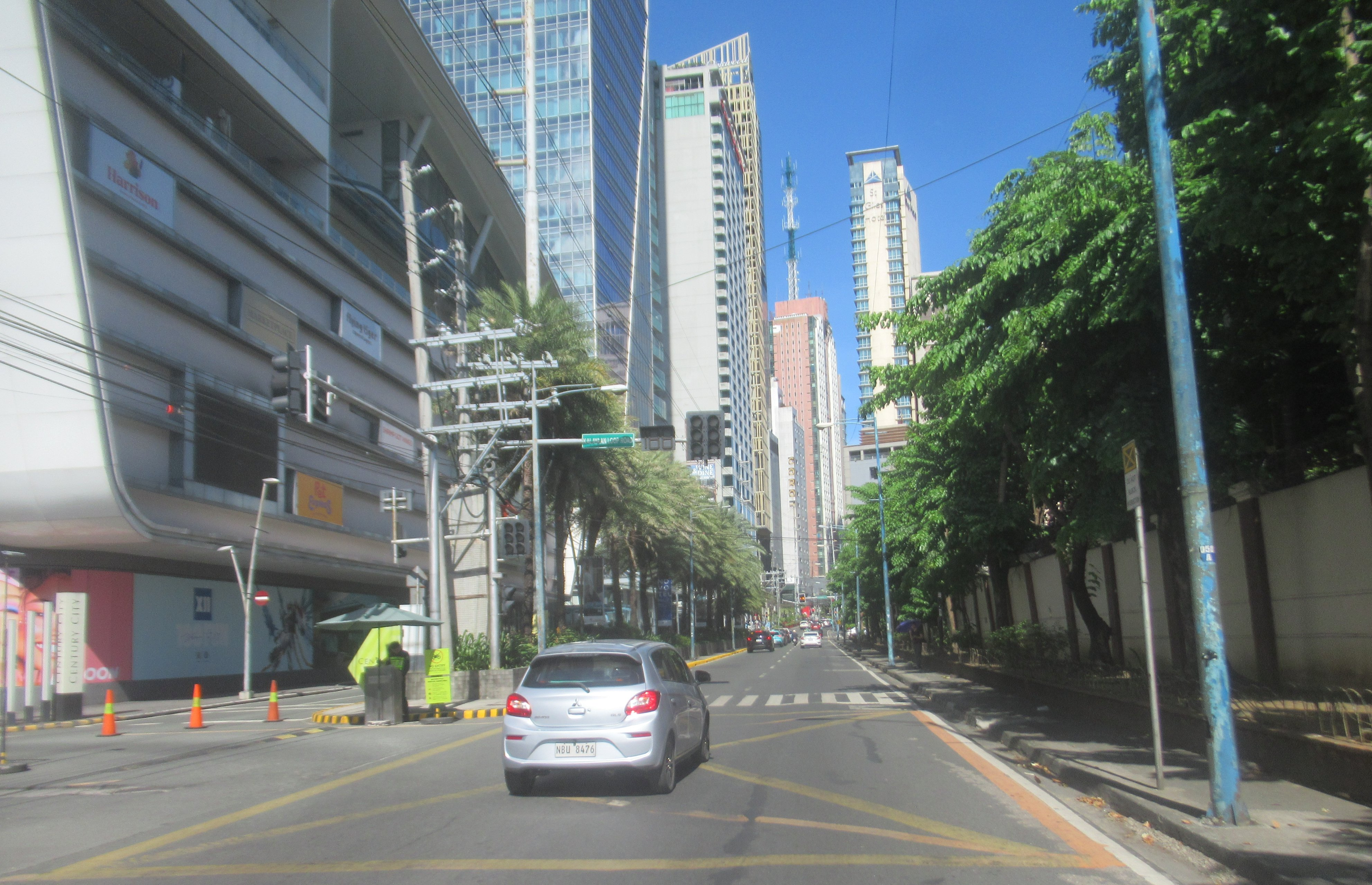
Kalayaan Avenue between Century City and Bel-Air Village Phase II in Makati

The western section begins as a four-lane road at the intersection with Zobel Roxas Street at the border of Makati and Manila, continuing the Pasig Line Street in San Andres, Manila. It cuts across the northern portion of the city, traversing barangays Singkamas, Tejeros, Santa Cruz, Olympia, Valenzuela, Bel-Air, and Poblacion. Starting as a two-way road, it becomes a one-way eastbound road from Pasong Tirad Street in Tejeros. From South Avenue to Nicanor Garcia Street, Kalayaan bounds the Manila South Cemetery and the Makati Columbarium (formerly the site of Makati Catholic Cemetery) to the south. It crosses into the western edge of barangays Bel-Air and Población, where St. Andrew the Apostle Parish is located. Kalayaan then becomes a two-way road once again near Century City. Heading east towards the intersection with Makati Avenue, Kalayaan is dominated by the Century City and Picar Place developments on the northern side. At Makati Avenue, the road traverses a major entertainment and hotel district, with many nightclubs, bars and mid to low-range hotels in the immediate vicinity. The section of Kalayaan east of P. Burgos Street is home to many sports pubs. It ends at a merge with Rockwell Drive by the entrance to the gated Bel-Air Village, where it continues as Mercedes Street.

=== East Kalayaan ===
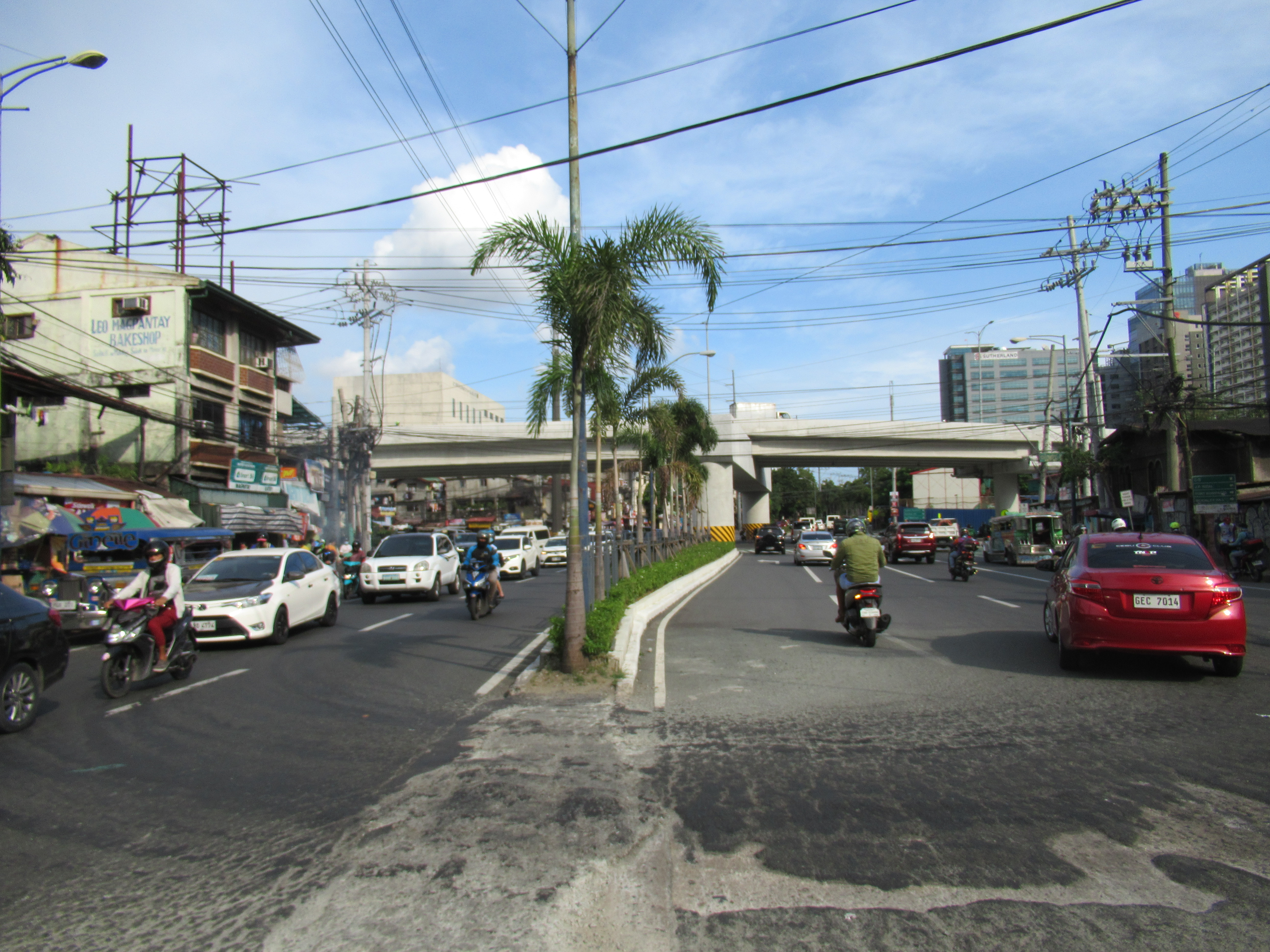
Kalayaan Avenue towards its intersection with Lawton Avenue in Taguig, north of Bonifacio Global City

East of Bel-Air, at the intersection with EDSA in barangay Pinagkaisahan, Makati, the avenue picks up as a 6-8 lane divided highway, also known as Kalayaan Avenue Extension. It runs underneath the Kalayaan Flyover, heading towards the entrance to Bonifacio Global City, entering Taguig at barangay Pitogo. It veers northeast at the junction with 32nd Street, bypassing Bonifacio Global City. The road continues as it heads into Guadalupe Nuevo, where it briefly returns to Makati before re-entering Taguig at barangay Cembo. It bends eastwards just before coming to an intersection with 8th Avenue in barangay West Rembo. This the westbound portion of the intersection also hosts the entry and exit ramps of the Santa Monica-Lawton Bridge coming from and going to Mandaluyong. The road crosses 8th Avenue and then Carlos P. Garcia Avenue (C-5) at the Circumferential Road 5–Kalayaan Avenue Interchange and ends at J.P. Rizal Extension in barangay East Rembo. It then continues towards barangay San Joaquin, Pasig as San Guillermo Avenue.

== Intersections ==
Province	City/Municipality	km	mi	Destinations	Notes
Taguig – Pasig boundary				Buting Bridge over Taguig River	
Taguig				J.P. Rizal Avenue	Traffic light intersection.
Taguig				N11 (Carlos P. Garcia Avenue) – Pasig, Quezon City	Other side is accessible via elevated u-turn slot.
Taguig				9th, 10th, 11th Avenues	Eastbound only, access to Bonifacio Global City.
Taguig				Santa Monica-Lawton Bridge – Mandaluyong	Kalayaan Bridge southbound exit to westbound.
Taguig				Lawton Avenue/8th Avenue	Traffic light intersection.
Taguig				Santa Monica-Lawton Bridge – Mandaluyong	Westbound entry to Kalayaan Bridge Northbound. Access to Mandaluyong
Taguig				Acacia Street	Eastbound only.
Makati				Commercio Street	Traffic light intersection.
Makati				Sgt. Fabian Yabut Circle, Anastacio Street	Traffic light intersection.
Taguig				Gen. Jacinto Street	
Makati – Taguig boundary				Luzon Street	No access from opposite directions.
Taguig				N191 (Kalayaan Flyover) – Makati CBD	Westbound entrance to Kalayaan Flyover westbound.
Taguig				Palawan Street	No access from opposite directions.
Makati – Taguig boundary				32nd Street	Traffic light intersection. No left turn allowed from westbound.
Makati – Taguig boundary				N191 (Kalayaan Flyover) – C-5	Eastbound exit from Kalayaan Flyover eastbound.
Makati				Harvard Street	Traffic light intersection.
Makati				N191 (Kalayaan–EDSA Flyover) – Pasay	Entrance ramp to EDSA southbound.
Makati				AH26 (EDSA) – Cubao	Western terminus of the East Kalayaan segment.
Makati				Rockwell Drive	Eastern terminus of the West Kalayaan segment. Continues to Bel-Air Village as Mercedes Street.
Makati				P. Burgos Street	Traffic light intersection; one-way road.
Makati				Makati Avenue	Traffic light intersection.
Makati				Salamanca Street / Neptune Street	Traffic light intersection.
Makati				Kalayaan Loop Road	Former traffic light intersection, Kalayaan becomes one-way eastbound; access to Century City Mall.
Makati				F. Zobel Street	One-way road.
Makati				Nicanor Garcia Street	Traffic light intersection.
Makati				J.B. Roxas Street	
Makati				South Avenue	Traffic light intersection; one-way road.
Makati				Zapote Street	Traffic light intersection; one-way road.
Makati				Chino Roces Avenue	Former traffic light intersection.
Makati				Pasong Tirad Street	One-way road, Kalayaan becomes a two-way road.
Makati – Manila boundary				Zobel Roxas Street	Western terminus, continues west as Pasig Line Street.
1.000 mi = 1.609 km; 1.000 km = 0.621 mi: Incomplete access

== Landmarks ==
From west (Zobel Roxas Street) to east (Rockwell Drive):

- Puregold Makati
- Manila South Cemetery
- Saint Andrew the Apostle Church
- Century City
  - Century City Mall
  - Trump Tower Manila
- Bel-Air Village

Bel-Air Village is a gated community; the western segment ends here. The eastern segment continues from EDSA, eastward to J.P. Rizal Avenue Extension:

- Makati Science High School
- Kalayaan Flyover
- Santa Monica–Lawton Bridge
- Circumferential Road 5–Kalayaan Avenue Interchange

== See also ==
- Media related to Kalayaan Avenue (Makati) at Wikimedia Commons
