= Saint Andrew the Apostle Church =

Roman Catholic church in Makati, Philippines

Saint Andrew the Apostle Parish Church
- Parroquia San Andrés el Apóstol (Spanish)
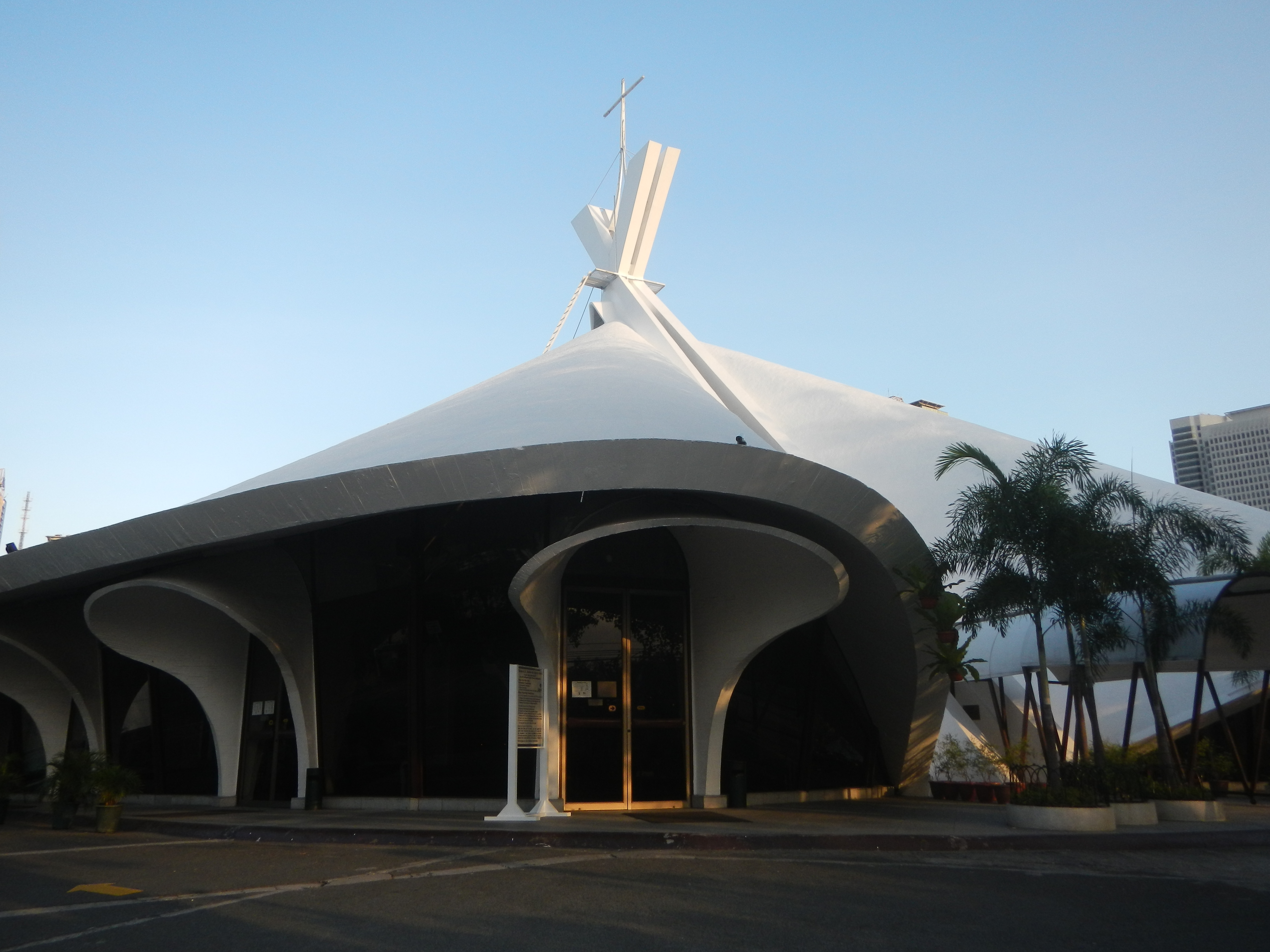
- The church in 2017
- Saint Andrew the Apostle Parish Church
- 14°33′58″N 121°01′25″E
- Location: 62 Constellation Street corner Nicanor Garcia Street, Bel-Air II, Makati, Metro Manila
- Country: Philippines
- Denomination: Roman Catholic

History
- Status: Parish church
- Dedication: St. Andrew the Apostle

Architecture
- Functional status: Active
- Architect: Leandro V. Locsin
- Architectural type: Church building
- Style: Modern
- Years built: 1967–1968
- Completed: November 29, 1968

Administration
- Archdiocese: Manila
- Deanery: Vicariate of Saints Peter and Paul

Clergy
- Priest: Pedro Gerardo O. Santos

Saint Andrew the Apostle Parish Church is a Roman Catholic church in Bel-Air Village, Makati, Philippines. It is one of the known modern edifices designed by Leandro V. Locsin in Makati. Dedicated to Andrew the Apostle, the patron saint of Metro Manila and Bel-Air Village, the church is under the jurisdiction of the Archdiocese of Manila. Its parish territories are Bel-Air Village and Salcedo Village in Barangay Bel-Air, Rizal Village and Santiago Village in Barangay Valenzuela, and San Miguel Village in Barangay Poblacion.

The cornerstone was laid on February 8, 1967, and the church opened on November 30, 1968.

== Church description ==
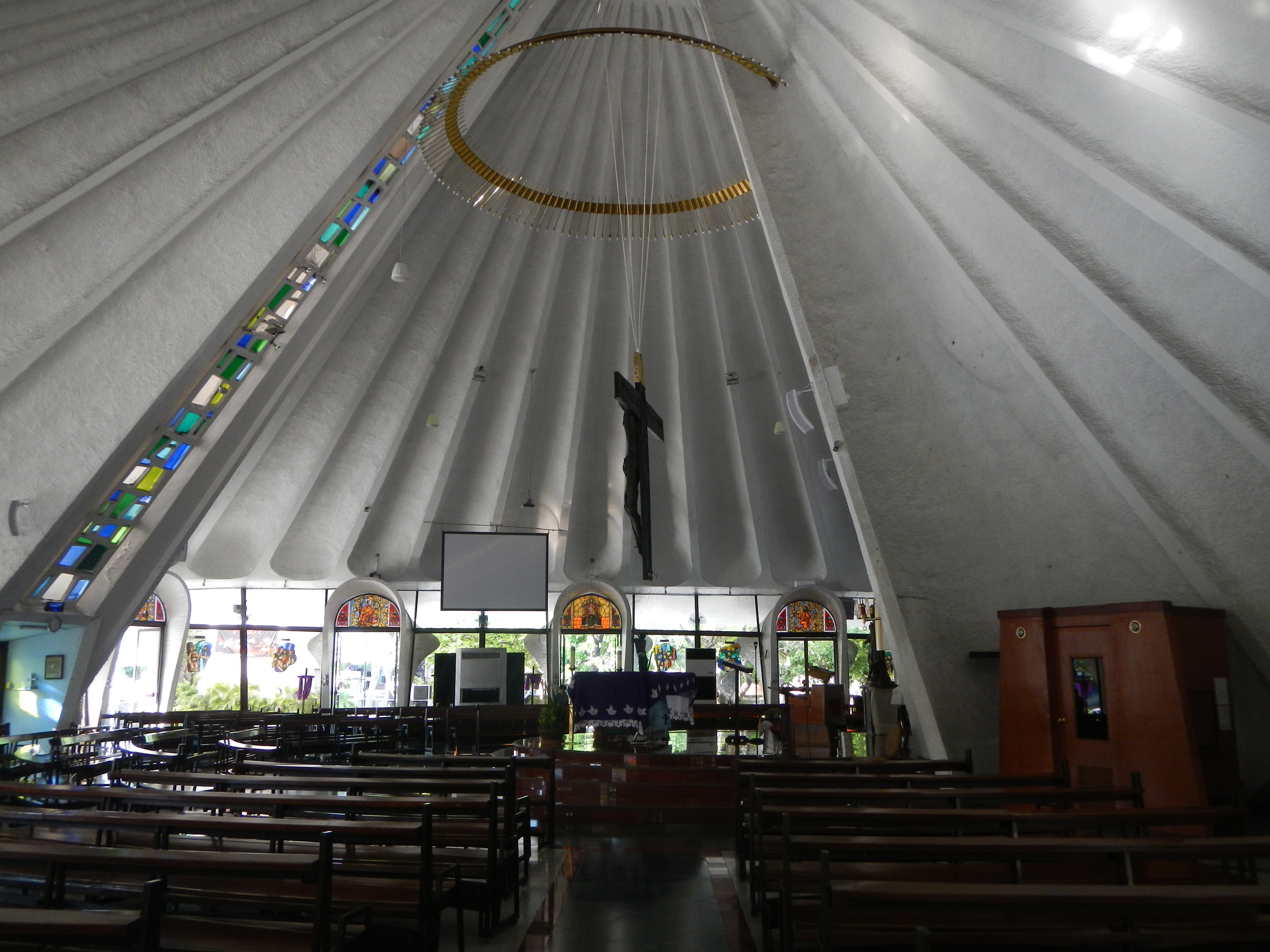
Church interior in 2013

Built by National Artist for Architecture Leandro Locsin in 1968, the design of this parish church is symbolic of the manner the martyr died: crucified on an X-shaped cross. The butterfly shaped floor plan emanates from this cruciform. Many other symbolic features mark the tent-like structure, including the giant chandelier over the altar which serves as a halo over the copper cross by National Artist for Visual Art Vicente Manansala.

== Pastors ==
Name	Years of pastorship	Present assignment
Emilio Bularan	1967 to 1969	deceased priest of the Diocese of Antipolo
Wilfredo Ipapo	1969 to 1972	deceased
Jesus Arcellana	1972 to 1982	deceased
Severino Pelayo	1982 to 1986	deceased Military Ordinary of the Philippines
Leoncio Lat	1986	deceased Auxiliary Bishop of Manila
Jose "Chito" Bernardo Jr.	1986 to 1991	deceased
Francisco De Leon	1991 to 1993	Bishop Emeritus of the Diocese of Antipolo
Claro Matt Garcia	1993 to 2002	Parish priest of Santa Clara de Montefalco Parish in Pasay
Emmanuel V. Sunga	2002 to 2011	Attached priest of the Archdiocesan Shrine Our Lady of Loreto in Sampaloc, Manila
Eymard Dennis Peter Marcelino S. Odiver	2011 to 2022	Rector and parish priest of the Archdiocesan Shrine of Espiritu Santo in Santa Cruz, Manila
Pedro Gerardo O. Santos	2022 to present	

== Other present priests ==
Name	Year started	Present assignment
Enrico Emmanuel A. Ayo	2024	Attached priest
Moises Eduardo Ciego	2025	Attached priest

== Former priests ==
* not yet complete

Name	Previous assignment
Erwin B. Blasa	Resident guest priest
Jeffrey T. Jamias	Parochial vicar/assistant parish priest
Peter Trong Tran	Resident guest priest
Stephen K. Jantuah	Resident guest priest
Dennis Sudla	Resident guest priest
Patrick B. Paraiso	Resident guest priest
Victor Allan B. Dichoso	Parochial vicar/assistant parish priest
Mylo Hubert Vergara	Parochial vicar/assistant parish priest

== Gallery ==
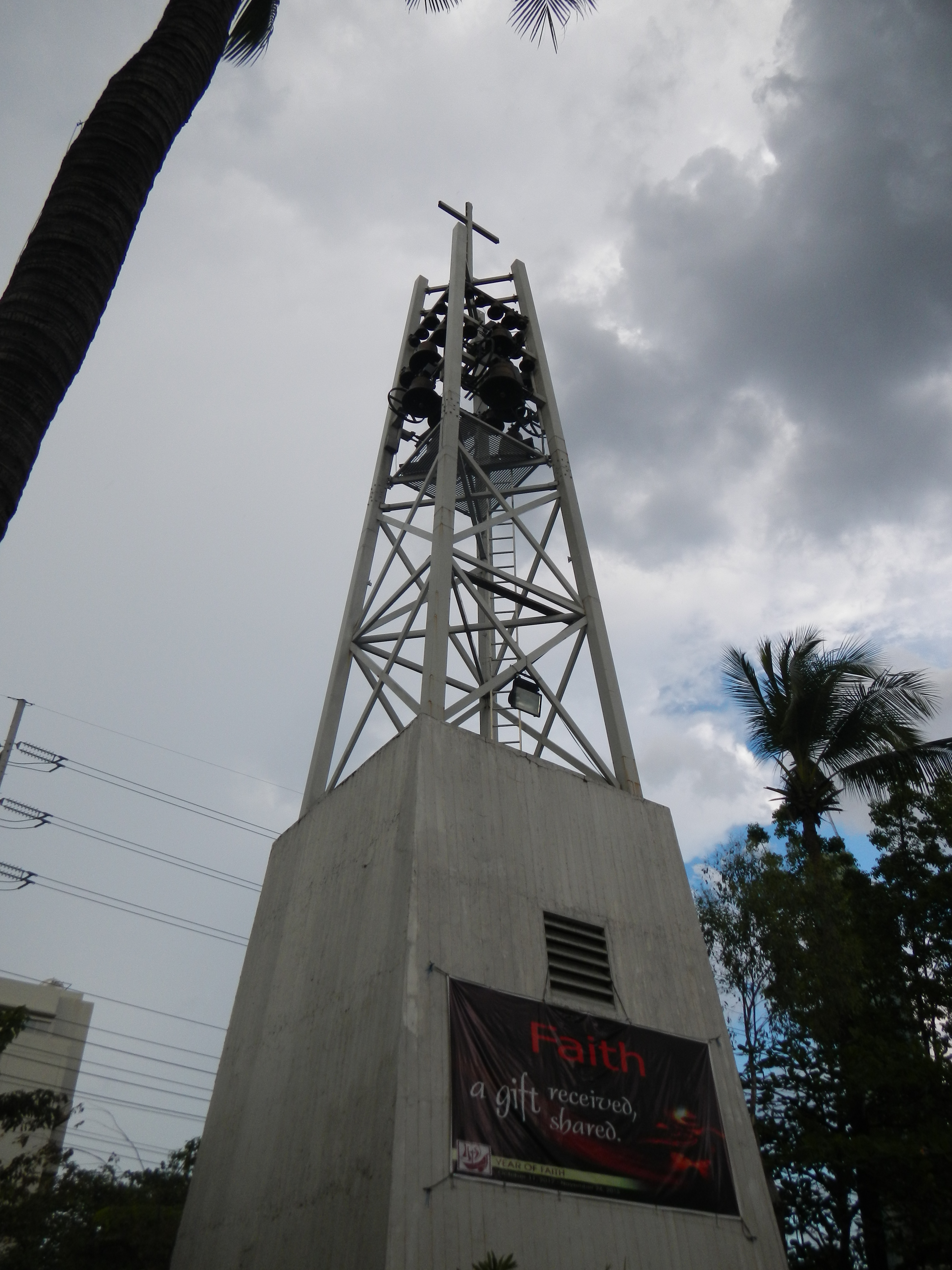
Bell tower

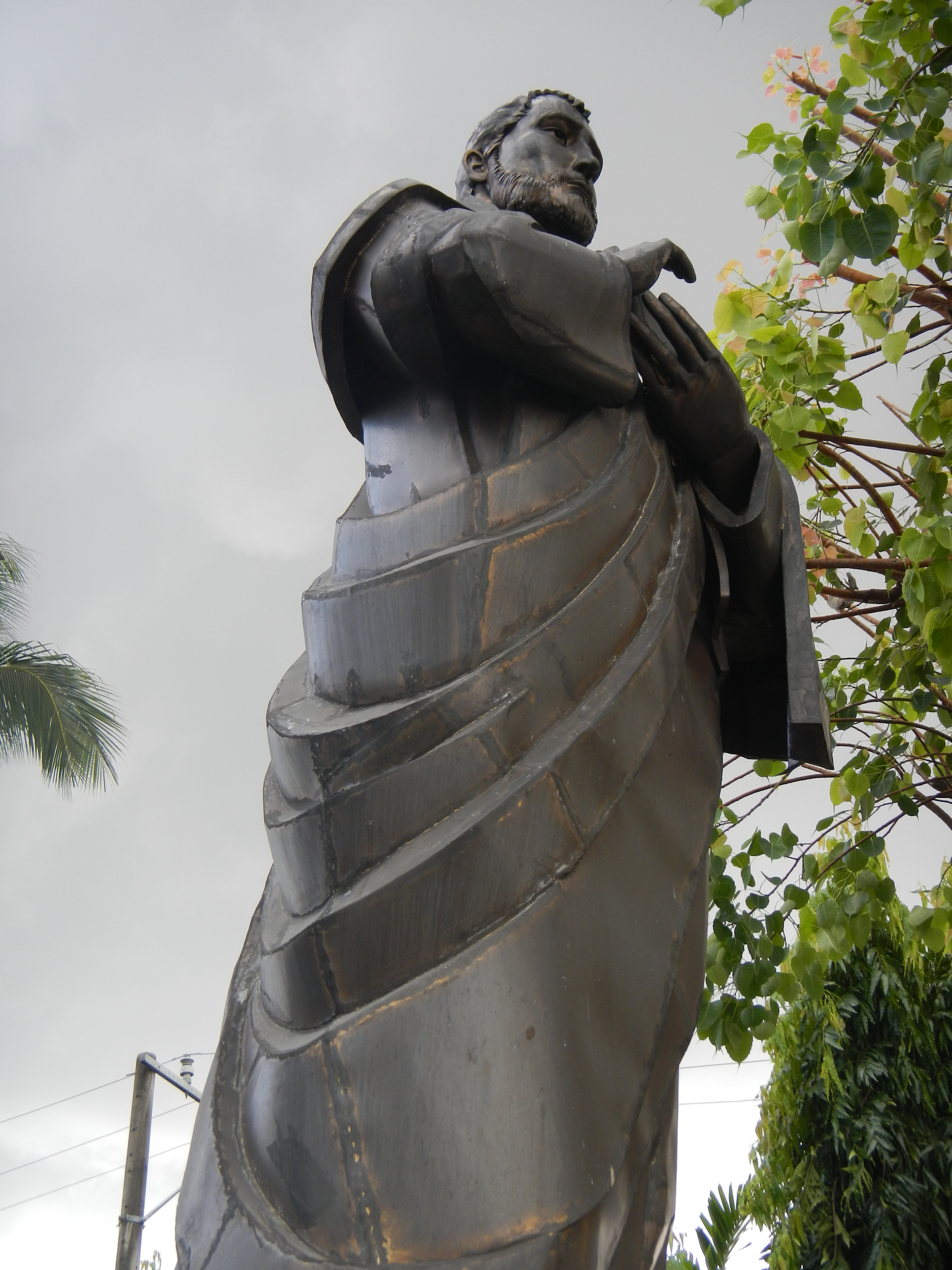
Statue to St. Andrew

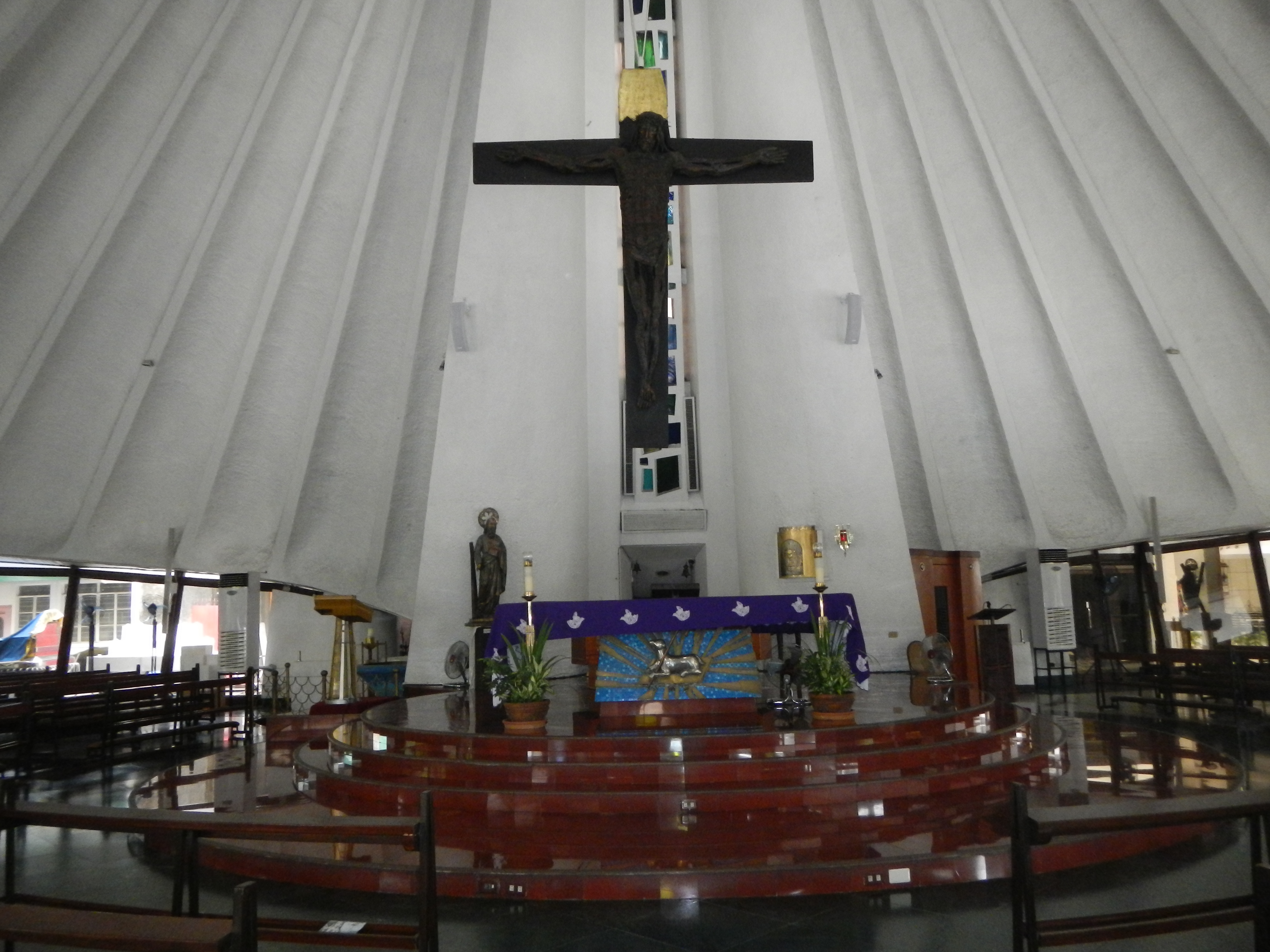
Church sanctuary

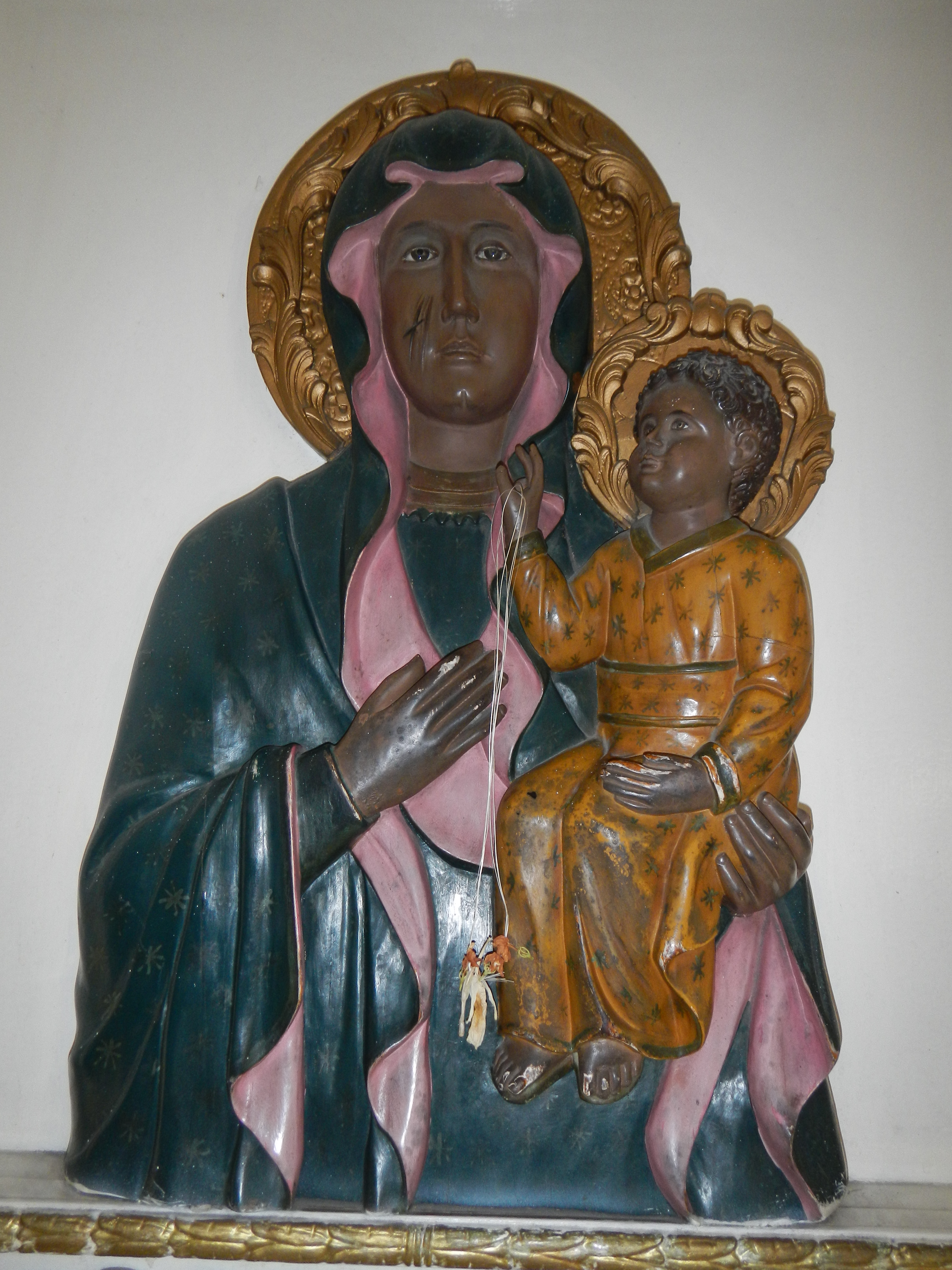
Our Lady of Częstochowa

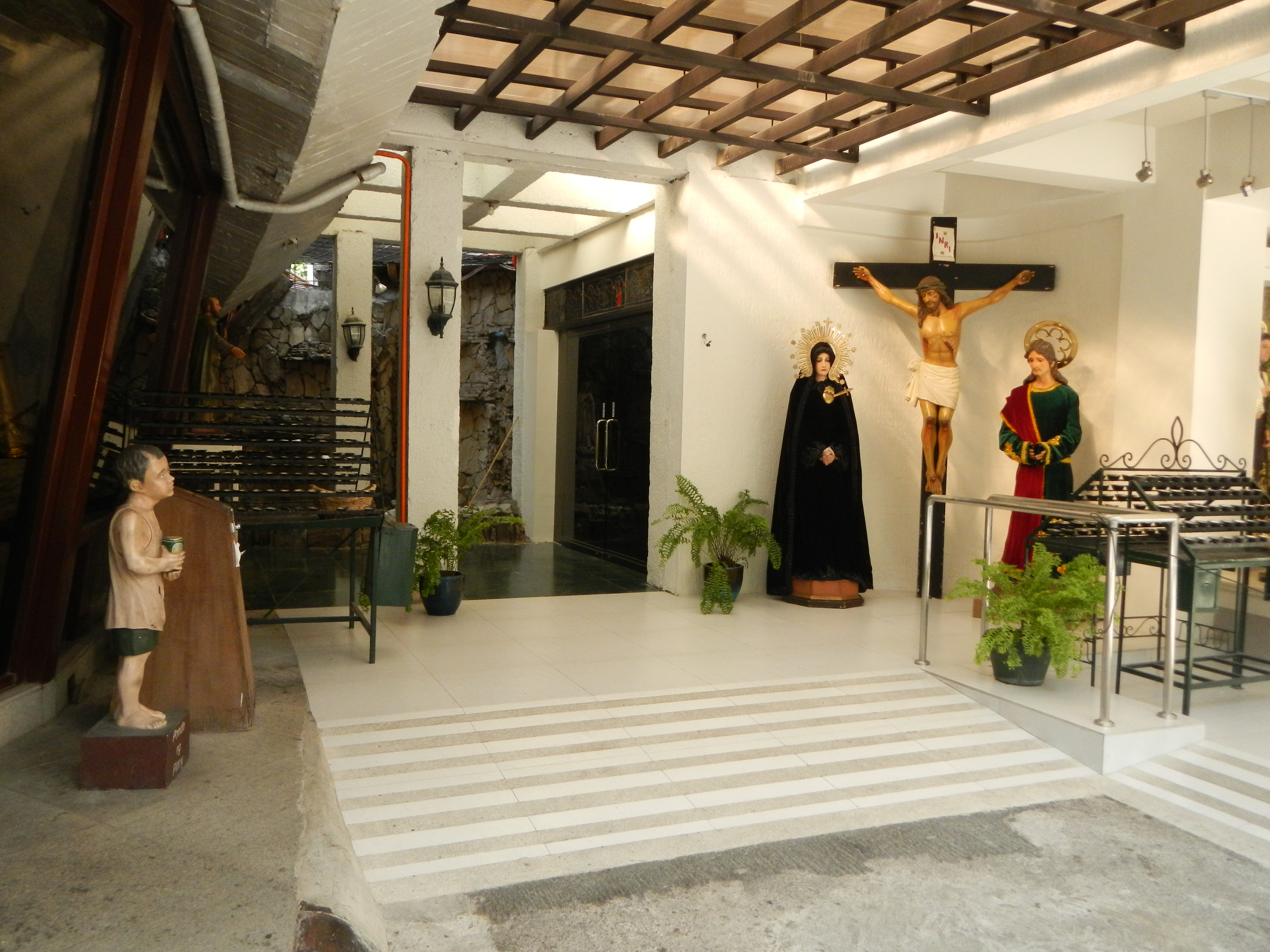
Images, candle holders, adoration chapel, and donation box

Stained glass window

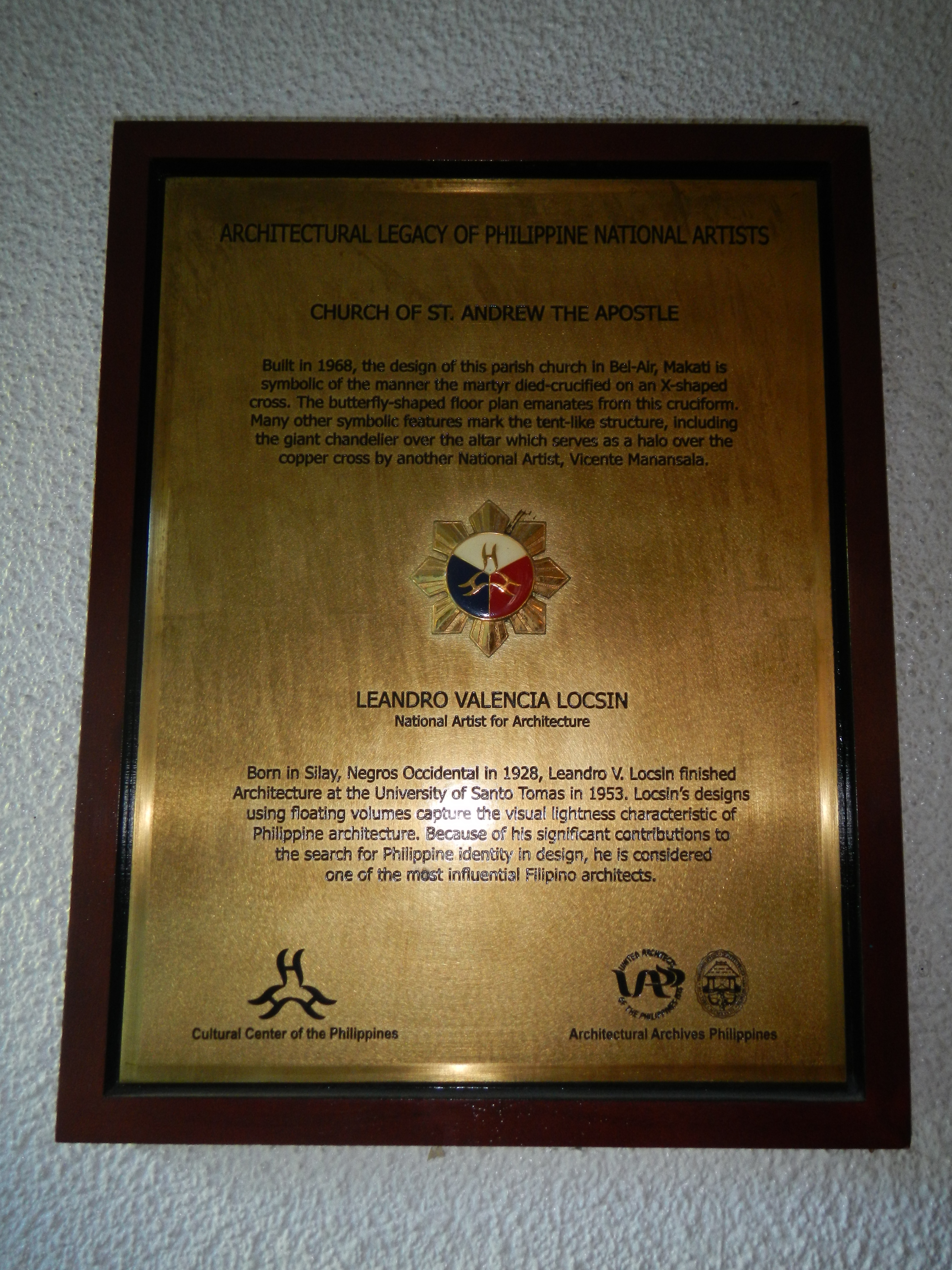
Architectural Legacy of Philippine National Artists plaque
