= J.P. Rizal Avenue =

Major thoroughfare in Metro Manila, Philippines

Coordinates: 14°34′26″N 121°0′42″E

R-4
- J.P. Rizal Street
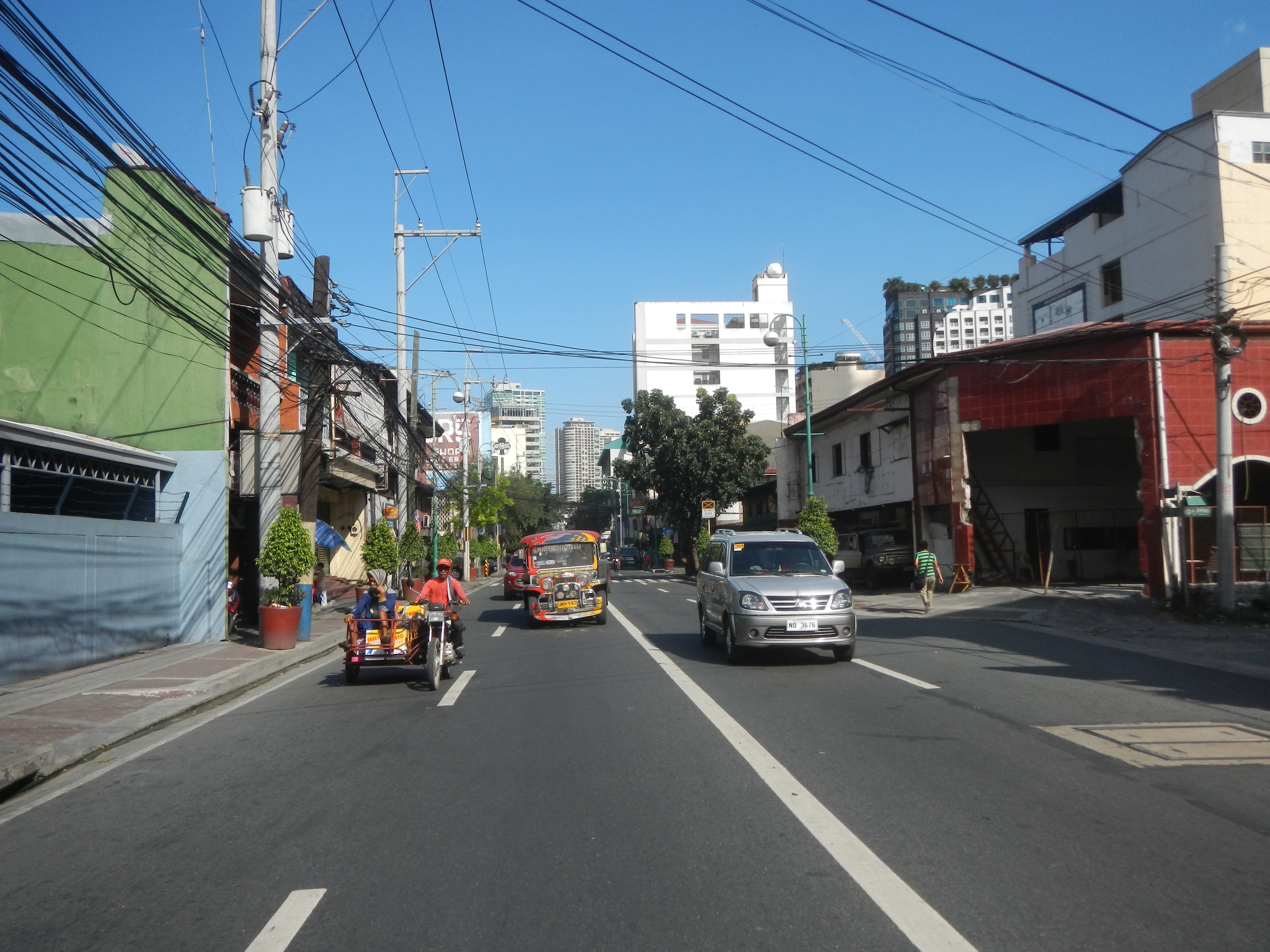
- J.P. Rizal looking east in Poblacion, Makati
- Interactive map of J.P. Rizal Avenue
- Former names: Guadalupe–Pateros Road (from EDSA to Pateros Bridge); Manila East Road
- Namesake: José P. Rizal
- Type: National Road
- Length: 8.1 km (5.0 mi)
- Component highways: R-4 R-4
- Location: Makati and Taguig
- West end: Zobel Roxas Street, Delpan Street, and Tejeron Street at Makati–Manila boundary
- Major junctions: AH26 (EDSA); N190 (Kalayaan Avenue)
- East end: Pateros Bridge at Taguig–Pateros boundary

J.P. Rizal Avenue, also known as J.P. Rizal Street, is a major local avenue in Makati and Taguig, Metro Manila, Philippines. It is a contour collector road on the south bank of the Pasig River that runs east–west from Pateros Bridge at the Taguig–Pateros boundary to its intersection with Zobel Roxas, Delpan, and Tejeron Streets at the Makati–Manila boundary. It is a component of Radial Road 4 (R-4). The avenue was named after the Philippines' national hero, Dr. José P. Rizal.

J.P. Rizal extends past Circumferential Road 5 into East Rembo, Comembo, and the municipality of Pateros as J.P. Rizal Avenue Extension. West of Zobel Roxas, it continues as Tejeron Street, which ends at its intersection with Pedro Gil and Dr. M. L. Carreon Streets. The eastern section and extension between Guadalupe Nuevo and Pateros was formerly called Guadalupe–Pateros Road, and its section from Lawton Avenue eastwards forms part of McKinley–Pateros Road.

== Route description ==
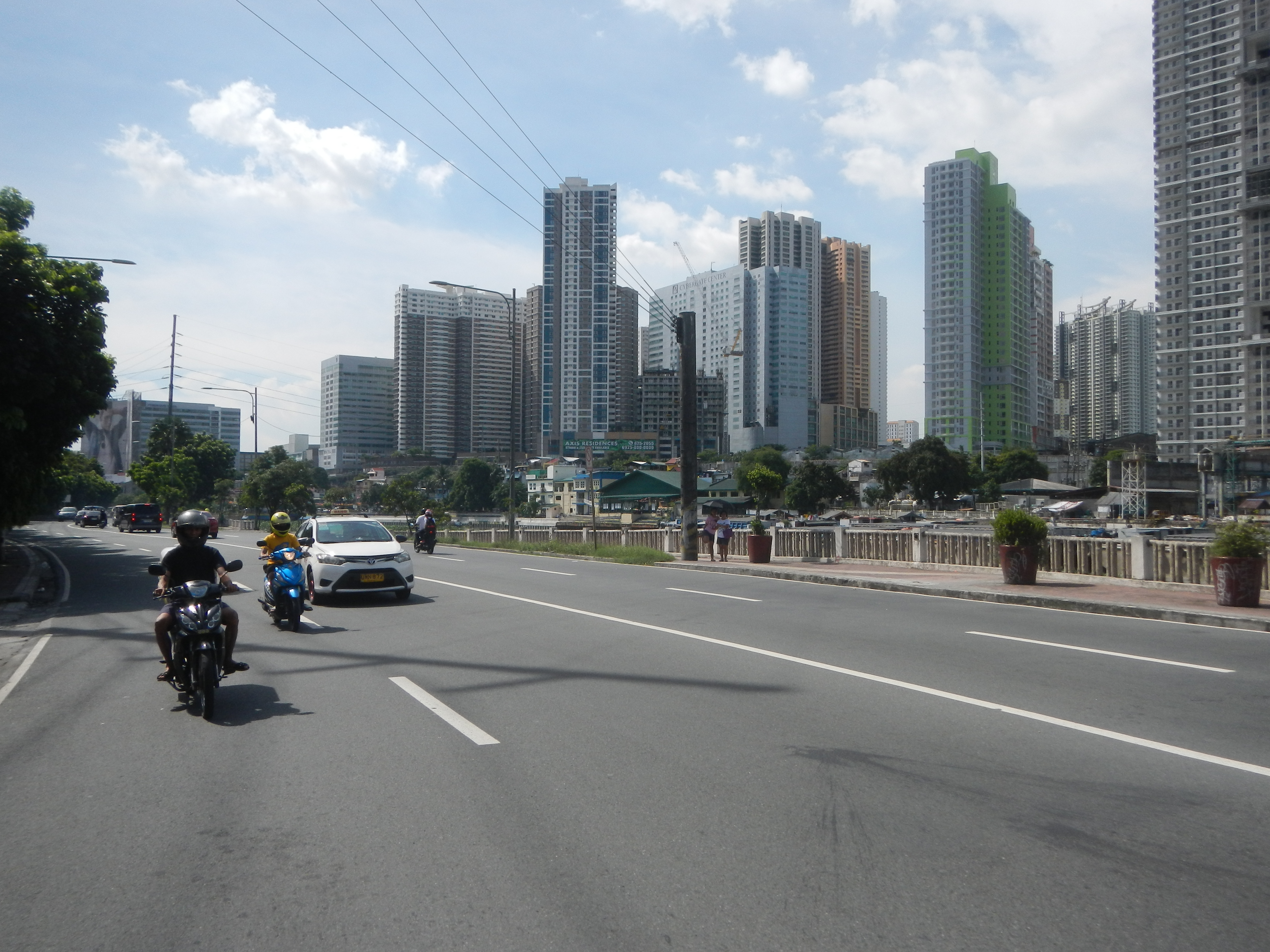
J.P. Rizal Avenue Extension westbound in Cembo, Taguig

The road starts at Pateros Bridge, which connects Taguig and Pateros, as a continuation of Gen. B. Morcilla Street past the Taguig River. It meanders through the residential communities of barangays Comembo, West Rembo, East Rembo, and Cembo. The road continues past Kalayaan Avenue. The Circumferential Road 5 (C-5) then crosses above the avenue; one vehicle cannot go into C-5 directly from J.P. Rizal Avenue except when using Kalayaan Avenue as a conduit. It intersects with Lawton Avenue just past the University of Makati campus, which connects it to Bonifacio Global City nearby. The avenue enters Makati at Guadalupe Nuevo as it crosses the San Jose Creek past the Guadalupe ferry terminal.

Crossing under the Guadalupe Bridge of Epifanio de los Santos Avenue (EDSA), the road runs through Guadalupe Viejo and Rockwell Center. West of Estrella Street, it enters the Makati Población area, where the road gradually pulls away from the river at the Plaza Trece de Agosto (near the Makati Poblacion Park). It then comes to an intersection with P. Burgos Street and Makati Avenue, where it becomes one-way westbound traffic on daytime and early evening, covering rush hours, up to Pasong Tirad in Barangay Tejeros. Located in this section are the Makati City Hall and Circuit Makati, formerly the site of Santa Ana Race Track. The avenue then curves northwest past Pasong Tirad before coming to its western terminus at Zobel Roxas and Delpan Streets at the city's border with Manila, continuing as Tejeron Street.

== History ==
The road is the old main road of Makati, once a municipality of the Province of Manila and later of Rizal. It also traversed a military reservation (now known as Fort Bonifacio) and the area that was previously part of Pateros. The first Municipal Building of Makati, the Presidencia, was also built along the road in 1918 at Plaza Trece de Agosto; it is now occupied today by the Museo ng Makati. The road was historically part of the Manila East Road and Calle Tejeron. Its segment from Malapad-na-bato (now East Rembo, the present-day location of Napindan Hydraulic Control System) westwards was also part of Route 21 or Highway 21 that linked Manila to Calamba, Laguna by circumscribing Laguna de Bay through Rizal, especially during the American colonial era. Its segment veering south approaching Pateros poblacion from Malapad-na-Bato was built in the first half of the 20th century.

== Intersections ==
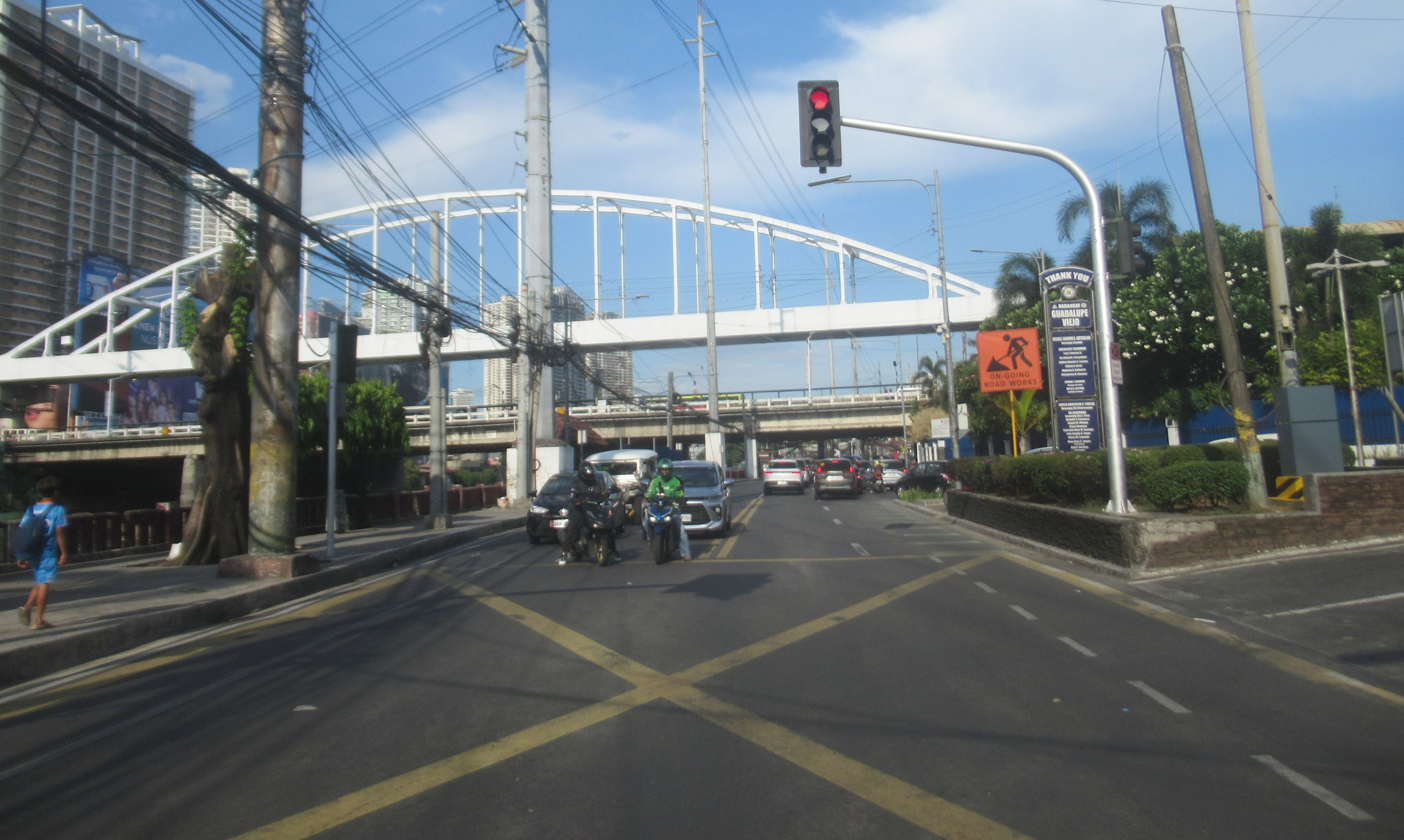
Guadalupe Cloverleaf, the avenue's interchange with EDSA

Province	City/Municipality	km	mi	Destinations	Notes
Taguig – Pateros boundary				Pateros bridge over Taguig River (Eastern Terminus, continues east as B. Morcilla Street)	
Taguig				Sampaguita Street / Anahaw Street	Traffic light intersection.
Taguig				Kalayaan Avenue	Traffic light intersection.
Taguig				Lawton Avenue	Traffic light intersection.
Makati – Taguig boundary				Yabut Bridge	
Makati				Sgt. Fabian Yabut Circle	Access to Guadalupe Nuevo.
Makati				AH26 (EDSA) – Cubao	Guadalupe interchange, traffic light intersections.
Makati				Camia Street	
Makati				Estrella Street	
Makati				J.D. Villena Street	
Makati				Makati Avenue / P. Burgos Street	Traffic light intersection; road becomes one-way westbound.
Makati				E. Zobel Street	One-way road.
Makati				F. Zobel Street	One-way road towards Makati City Hall.
Makati				Nicanor Garcia Street / Antipolo Street	Traffic light intersection.
Makati				Pililla Street	
Makati				J.B Roxas Street	
Makati				South Avenue / Taliba Street	Traffic light intersection; one-way road. Access to Circuit Makati
Makati				Zapote Street	Traffic light intersection; one-way road.
Makati				Chino Roces Avenue / A.P. Reyes Avenue	No crossing on J.P. Rizal westbound.
Makati				Pasong Tirad Street	One-way road, J.P. Rizal becomes a two-way road.
Makati – Manila boundary				Zobel Roxas Street / Del Pan Street	Western terminus. Continues to Manila as Tejeron Street.
1.000 mi = 1.609 km; 1.000 km = 0.621 mi: Incomplete access

== Landmarks ==
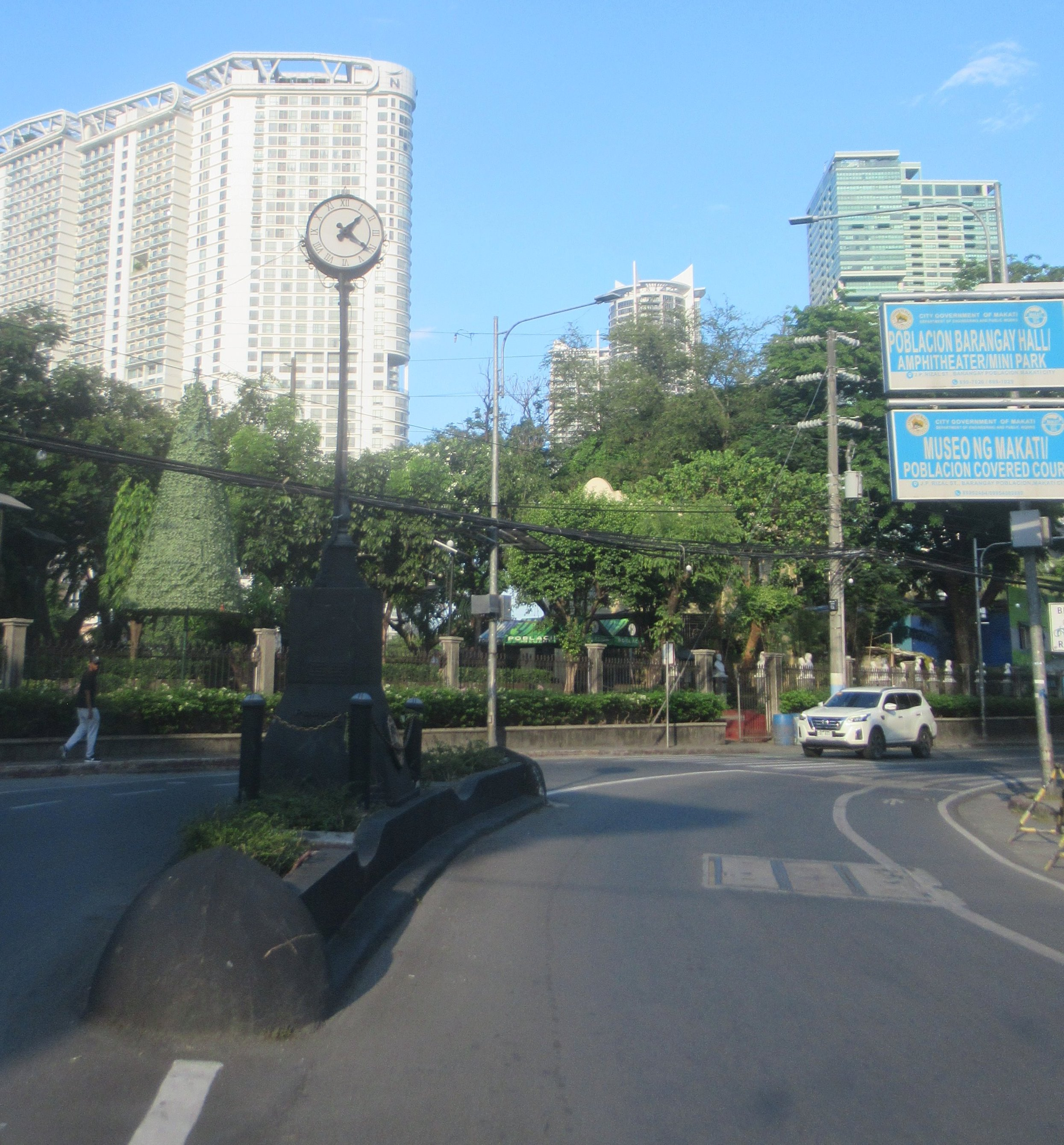
Makati City Clock-Tower at Plaza Trece de Agosto, where J.P. Rizal curves

- Casa Hacienda Park
- Circuit Makati (via Taliba and Zapote Streets)
  - Ayala Malls Circuit
  - Samsung Performing Arts Theater
- Comembo Public Market
- Fort Bonifacio High School
- Guadalupe BLISS
- Guadalupe Linear Park
- Guadalupe Viejo Cloverleaf Park
- Holy Cross Parish Makati
- Kennely Ann L. Binay Park (Guadalupe Nuevo Cloverleaf Park)
- Makati City Hall
- Makati Aqua Sports Arena
- Mater Dolorosa Parish
- Museo ng Makati
- Napindan Hydraulic Control Structure
- Olympia Market
- Poblacion Park
- Poblacion Sports Complex
- Puregold Makati
- Rockwell Center
  - Nestle Philippines Inc.
  - Power Plant Mall
  - Proscenium
- Taguig People's Park
- University of Makati

== See also ==
- Pasig River Expressway
- Media related to Rizal Avenue (Makati and Taguig) at Wikimedia Commons
