= Circumferential Road 5–Kalayaan Avenue Interchange =

Road interchange in the Philippines

- C-5–Kalayaan Interchange
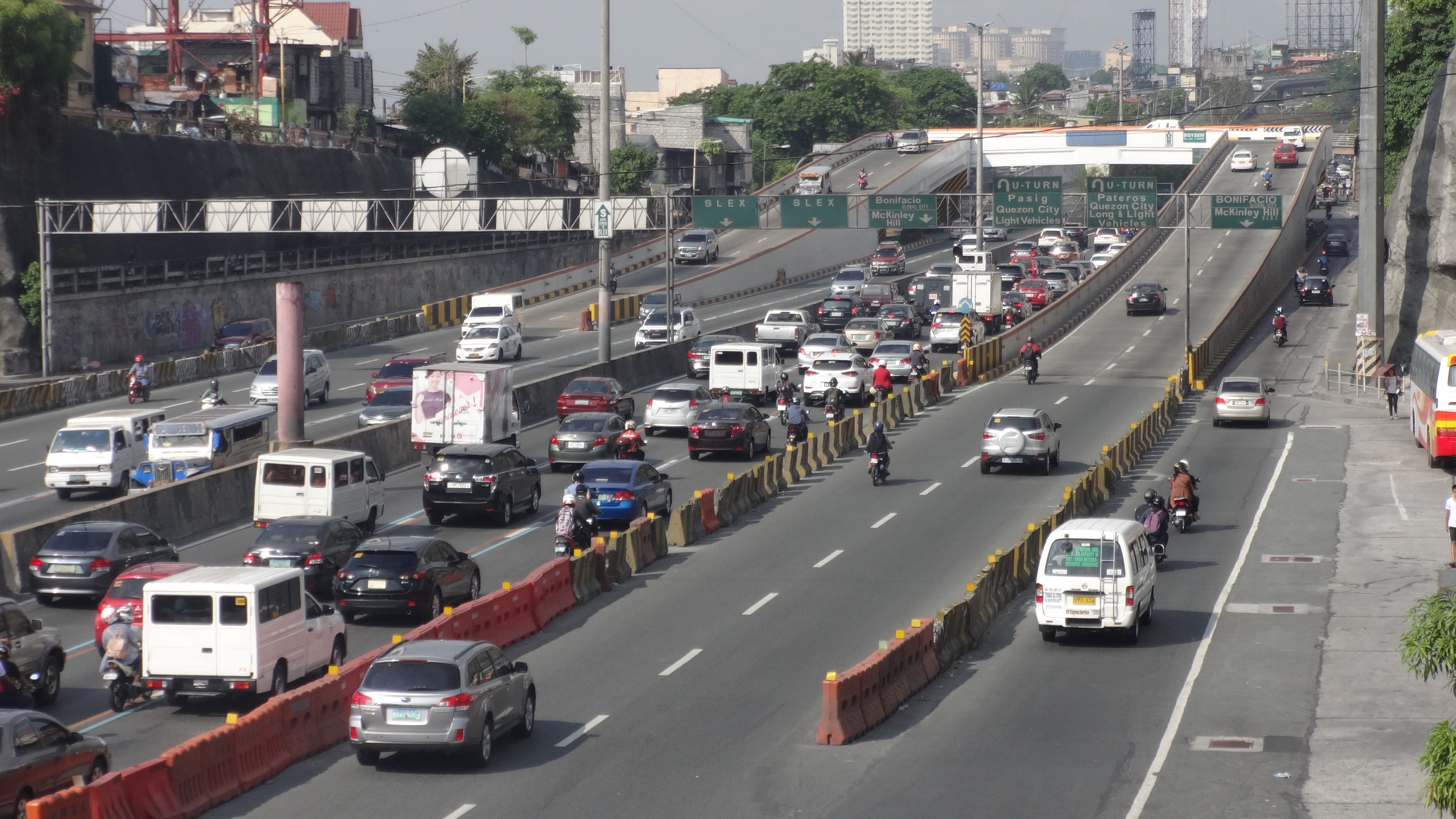
- Northern elevated U-turn slot of the C-5–Kalayaan Interchange
- Interactive map of Circumferential Road 5–Kalayaan Avenue Interchange

Location
- Taguig, Metro Manila, Philippines
- Coordinates: 14°33′22.20″N 121°3′47.11″E
- Roads at junction: N11 (Circumferential Road 5); N190 (Kalayaan Avenue)

Construction
- Type: Four-way intersection with two elevated U-turn slots
- Constructed: 2008–2009
- Opened: May 6, 2009
- Maintained by: Department of Public Works and Highways; Metropolitan Manila Development Authority

The Circumferential Road 5–Kalayaan Avenue Interchange (also known as the C-5–Kalayaan Interchange) is a road interchange in East Rembo, Taguig, Philippines. Originally a regular four-way intersection between Carlos P. Garcia Avenue, a part of Circumferential Road 5 (C-5), and Kalayaan Avenue, it was fitted in 2009 with the country's first elevated U-turn slots, built in an attempt to speed up traffic along the C-5 corridor.

== History ==
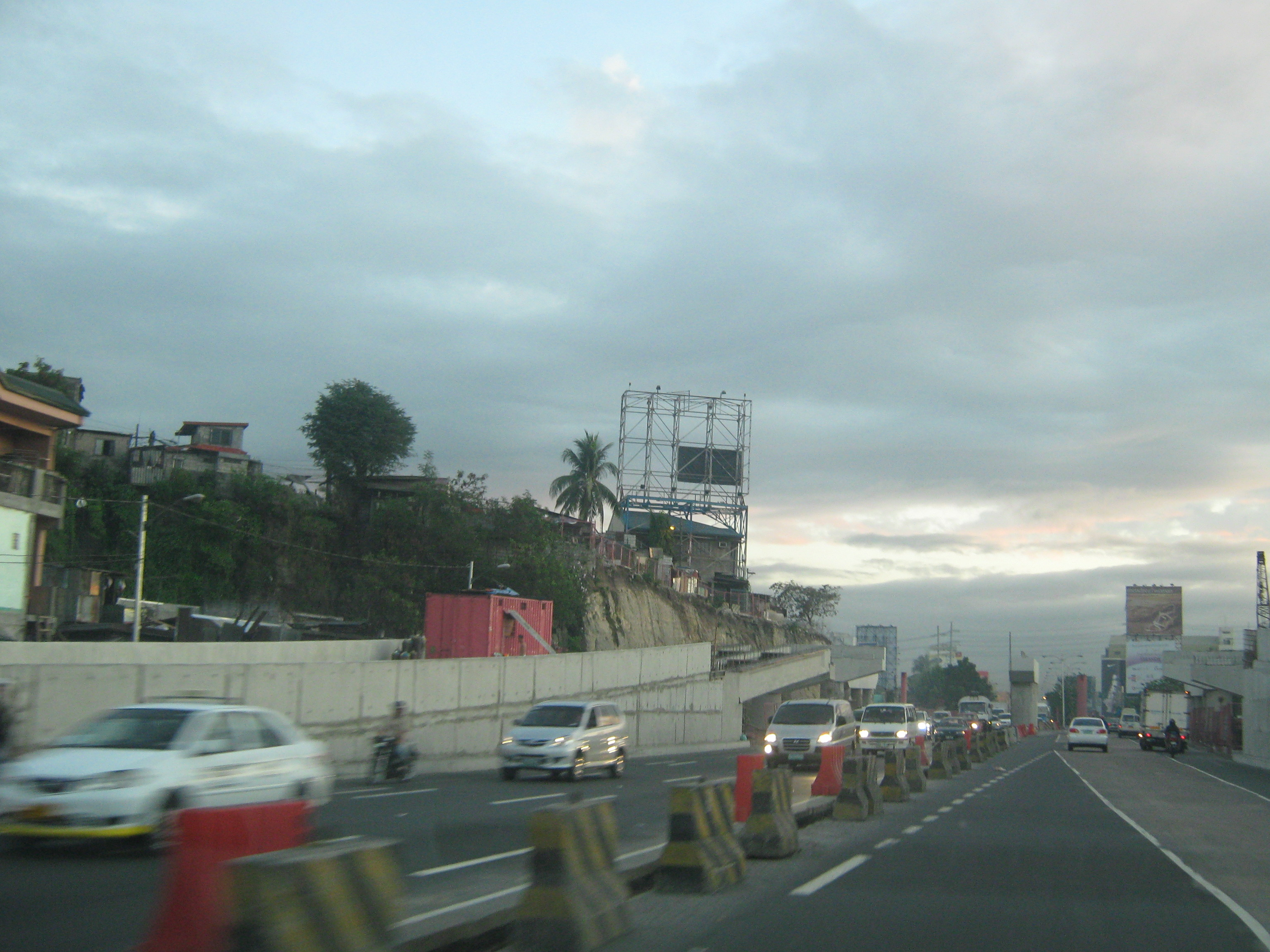
The unfinished northern section of the C-5 Kalayaan elevated U-turn slot in March 2009, about two months before its completion

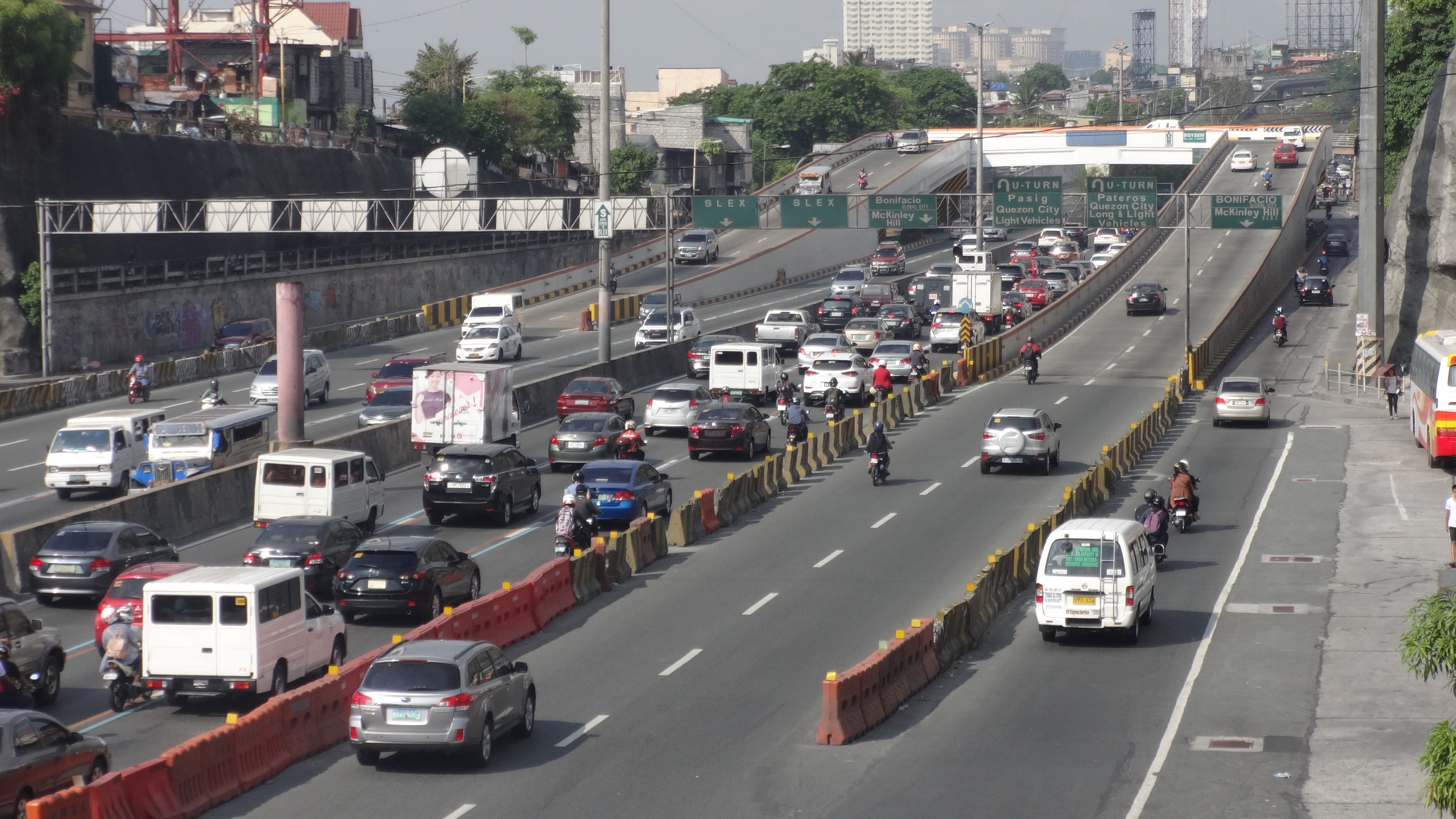
Southern elevated U-turn slot of the C-5–Kalayaan Interchange

According to a 1978 feasibility study by Japan International Cooperation Agency (JICA), the intersection of Radial Road 4 (now the eastern portion of Kalayaan Avenue) and Circumferential Road 5 was proposed about 2.5 meters (8 ft 2 in) northeast of C-5–Kalayaan intersection's present location. The intersection was designed as a signalized four-way junction. However, it was realigned to its present location, where Kalayaan Avenue now follows much of the defunct Paco–Pasig tram line.

The C-5–Kalayaan intersection is the first major intersection of C-5 south of the Pasig River, and traffic congestion in the area is very heavy, even extending to as far north as Ortigas Avenue during rush hour. It ultimately led both the Metropolitan Manila Development Authority (MMDA) and the Department of Public Works and Highways (DPWH) to conclude that the construction of an interchange between the two roads was needed to speed up traffic. However, both agencies disagreed on the final design of the interchange. While the DPWH sought to construct a 750-meter (2,460 ft), six-lane underpass to divert through traffic under the intersection, the MMDA claimed that this was too expensive and impractical and sought to build elevated U-turn slots instead, which it also argued would not require other infrastructure, such as street lamps and anti-flood measures, unlike an underpass.

In the end, the DPWH's proposal, which would have cost ₱600 million, was abandoned in favor of the MMDA's proposal, which was half the cost. Construction of the interchange, funded by a Japanese loan package, began in April 2008, when work began on the southern elevated U-turn slot, which was completed six months later. The northern elevated U-turn slot, meanwhile, began construction on December 2, 2008, and was completed on April 17, 2009. During construction, traffic normally crossing the C-5–Kalayaan intersection was diverted through Circumferential Road 3 (C-3), including Gregorio Araneta Avenue and Epifanio de los Santos Avenue (EDSA).

The entire interchange was inaugurated by President Gloria Macapagal Arroyo, accompanied by MMDA Chairman Bayani Fernando, on May 5, 2009, and opened to traffic the next day.

== Impact ==
The impact of the C-5–Kalayaan Interchange's construction was initially positive. Within a week of the interchange's opening, the MMDA claimed that traffic speed and vehicular volume increased, with more than 150,000 cars now passing through the intersection daily, taking an estimated 30,000 vehicles off EDSA. Traffic speed on C-5 also increased from 20.85 kilometers per hour (12.96 mph) in 2006 and 2007 to 38.84 kilometers per hour (24.13 mph) within two weeks of the interchange's completion, an increase of 86%.

=== Criticism ===
Criticism of the C-5–Kalayaan Interchange's construction has been varied, and public reaction has been mixed. It has been argued that the construction of the interchange led to significant public inconvenience and criticism of the design has varied from being aesthetically unpleasing to, in the words of Lester Dizon of The Philippine Star, being a "public nuisance". Another Star columnist, James Deakin, argued that the location of the elevated U-turn slots was ill-conceived, even calling the interchange one of Metro Manila's worst eyesores. Journalist Korina Sanchez, meanwhile, claimed that the interchange was a PR stunt for Bayani Fernando, who she claims was not used to going unnoticed.

Senator Francis Escudero meanwhile insinuated that the MMDA focuses too much energy on traffic mitigation instead of flood control, criticizing the opening of the interchange while Metro Manila was affected by flooding caused by Typhoon Emong (Chan-hom) just a few days earlier.

If the MMDA can spend millions in solving the traffic problem by building elevated U-turn slots along C-5, which many derisively call the ninth and tenth wonders of the world, then how come we don’t feel it is spending the same amount of money and effort for flood control?

Structurally, the elevated U-turn slots have been criticized for failing global traffic standards, even earning protest from a local association of structural engineers who questioned the interchange's safety.

The C-5–Kalayaan Interchange abuts three constituent Metro Manila local government units, and while then-Pateros mayor Joey Medina and then-Taguig mayor Sigfrido Tiñga were supportive of the interchange's construction, claiming that it allows them to better manage traffic in their respective localities; Makati Mayor Jejomar Binay opposed.

== See also ==
- Media related to Circumferential Road 5–Kalayaan Avenue Interchange at Wikimedia Commons
