= Singkamas, Makati =

Barangay in Makati, Metro Manila, Philippines

Singkamas
- Barangay
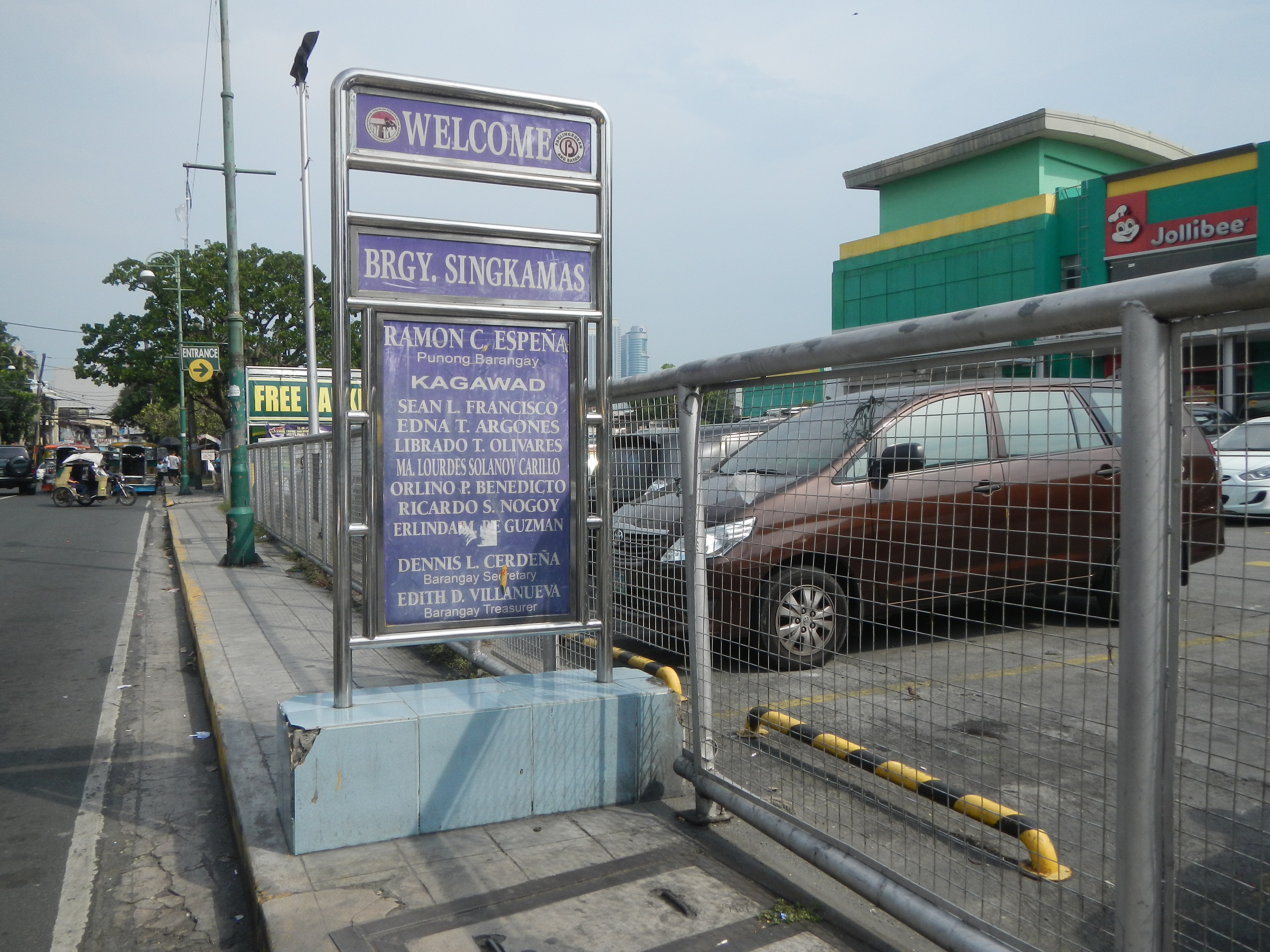
- Simgkamas Welcome Sign in front of Puregold Makati

- Location in Metro Manila
- Coordinates: 14°34′15.14″N 121°0′35.48″E
- Country: Philippines
- Region: National Capital Region
- City: Makati
- District: Part of the 1st District of Makati
- Established: 1960

Government
  - Type: Barangay
  - Barangay Captain: Sean Francisco
  - SK Chairperson: Mars Raven Del Rosario

Area
  - Total: 0.1293 km^{2} (0.0499 sq mi)

Population (2020)
  - Total: 7,218
  - Density: 55,820/km^{2} (144,600/sq mi)
- Time zone: UTC+8 (PST)
- Postal Code: 1204
- Area code: 02
- PSGC: 137602027

Singkamas is a barangay located in Makati, Metro Manila, Philippines. It is a predominantly residential area with a population of 7,218 recorded by the 2020 census. It is the second smallest barangay in Makati in terms of land area with a land area of 12.59 hectares (31.1 acres).

== Etymology ==
The name of the barangay derived from the word singkamas, a local term for jicamas, which was involved in the then-barrio's past unique tradition wherein it is hanged while it was fresh and succulent instead of the usual buntings during their fiesta.

== History ==
Present-day Singkamas was once part of Manila's Singalong area and were initially not included in the Hacienda San Pedro de Macati when it was purchased by the Zobel de Ayala family from the Jesuits in 1851. Singkamas later became a sitio part of Barrio Tejeros. It had about 200 houses of light materials and 150 houses of stronger built. The first move towards this independent status was taken in the early 1950s when the residents felt it would be more beneficial for them to have their own set of leaders and the autonomy to manage their own affairs especially its Barrio Fiesta.

In 1960, after the passage of Republic Act No. 2370 (Barrio Charter), Barangay Singkamas was officially recognized as a separate barrio from Barrio Tejeros. Inspired by their independent status, the inhabitants built their own house of worship — the Holy Cross Chapel — which became the rallying point of neighborhood rehabilitation. This landmark also became the center of public forum and festivities, like Christmas and Barrio Fiesta Celebrations. Being the second smallest barangay of Makati, Barangay Singkamas struggled to sustain its existence by depending on its sparse income or revenue derived from tax collections, individual retirement accounts (IRA) and real property tax (RPT) entitlements.
