= Radial Road 4 =

Road network in Metro Manila, Philippines

R-4 Radial Road 4
- R-4 Road
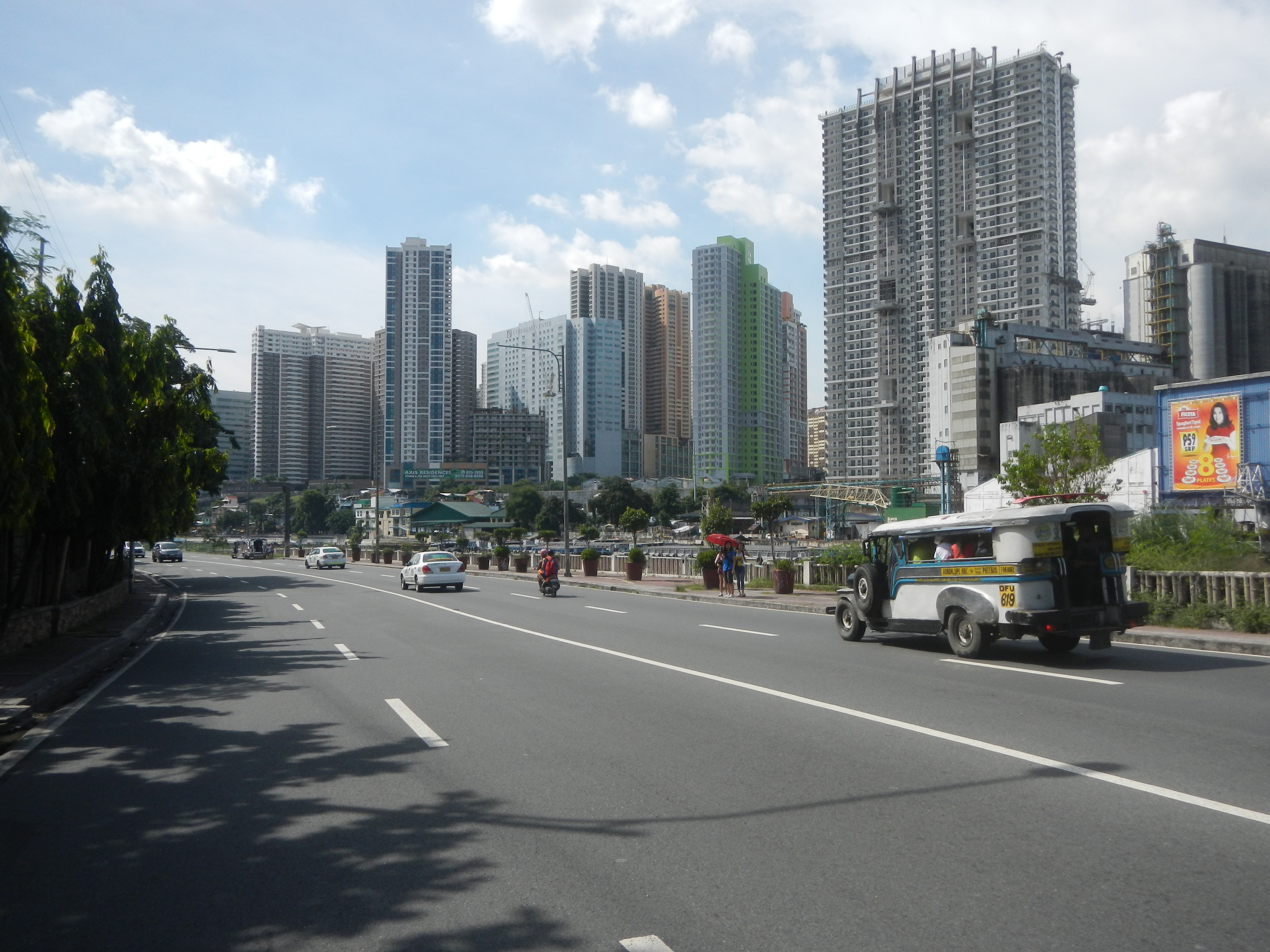
- J.P. Rizal Avenue Extension in Cembo, Taguig, a segment of R-4

Route information
- Maintained by the Department of Public Works and Highways and the Metropolitan Manila Development Authority
- Length: 8.85 km (5.50 mi)

Major junctions
- West end: Pedro Gil Street and Dr. M.L. Carreon Street in Manila
- AH 26 (N1) (EDSA) in Makati; N190 (Kalayaan Avenue) in Taguig
- East end: Pateros Bridge at Taguig–Pateros boundary

Location
- Country: Philippines
- Major cities: Makati, Manila, and Taguig

Highway system
- Roads in the Philippines; Highways; Expressways; List

Radial Road 4 (R-4), informally known as the R-4 Road, is a network of roads and bridges which comprise the fourth arterial road of Metro Manila in the Philippines. Spanning some 23.5 kilometers (14.6 mi), it connects the cities and municipalities of Makati, Manila, and Taguig in Metro Manila.

Previously, it ran along the Pasig Line, Kalayaan Avenue, M. Concepcion Avenue, Elisco Road, and Highway 2000 from Manila to Taytay, Rizal.

Initially conceived during the administration of Ferdinand Marcos, R-4's alignment was planned to be parallel to the Pasig River from C-2 in Manila to C-6 in Napindan, Taguig.

== Route description ==
=== Tejeron Street ===
R-4 begins in Manila as Tejeron Street, which straddles along the district boundary of San Andres and Santa Ana. It commences at the intersection of Pedro Gil Street and Dr. M.L. Carreon Streets.

=== J.P. Rizal Street ===
R-4 then proceeds as J.P. Rizal Street or J.P. Rizal Avenue as it enters the city of Makati past Zobel Roxas Street. It then runs parallel to the Pasig and Taguig Rivers until it terminates at the Pateros Bridge at the Taguig–Pateros boundary.

== See also ==
- Media related to Radial Road 4 at Wikimedia Commons
