= Kalayaan Flyover =

Flyover in Metro Manila, Philippines

Kalayaan Flyover
- EDSA–Kalayaan Flyover
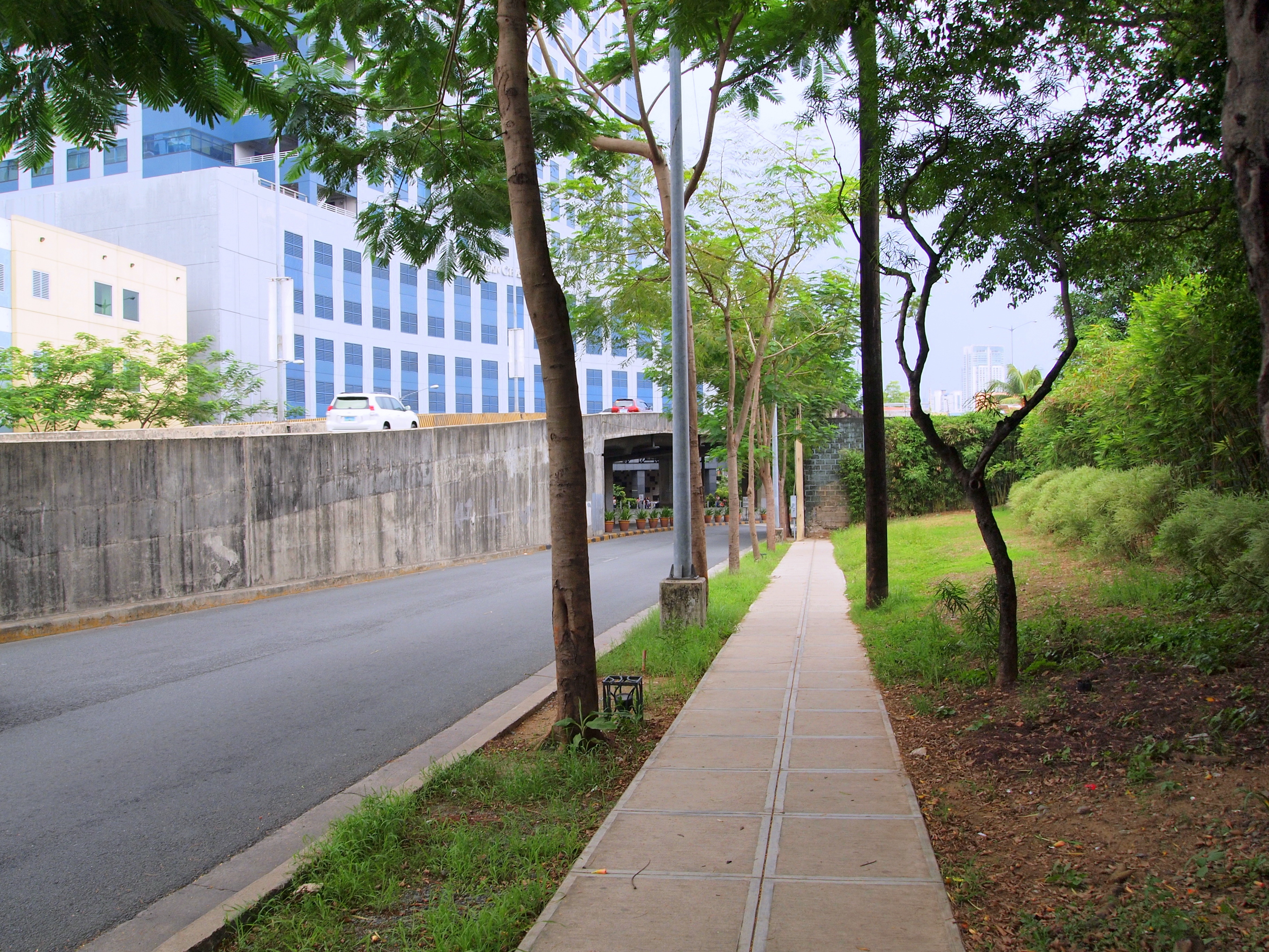
- The Kalayaan Flyover at the Bonifacio Global City

- Interactive map of Kalayaan Flyover

Location
- Makati and Taguig, Metro Manila, Philippines
- Coordinates: 14°33′27.4″N 121°02′18.7″E
- Roads at junction: N190 (Gil Puyat Avenue); AH 26 (N1) (EDSA); N190 (Kalayaan Avenue); 32nd Street

Construction
- Type: Two-level flyover
- Constructed: 1997–1999 by F.F. Cruz and Co. and Uy-Pajara Construction Company
- Opened: January 25, 2000
- Maintained by: Department of Public Works and Highways

The Kalayaan Flyover, also known as the EDSA–Kalayaan Flyover, is a four-lane flyover connecting Gil Puyat Avenue, Epifanio de los Santos Avenue (EDSA), Kalayaan Avenue, and 32nd Street in Metro Manila, Philippines. Located primarily in Makati with a short portion in Taguig, it facilitates access between the Makati Central Business District and Taguig, particularly Bonifacio Global City and Enlisted Men's Barrios (EMBOs).

Preparation work for the flyover began in 1997, when the Bases Conversion and Development Authority (BCDA) announced the construction of two new primary access points to the Bonifacio Global City, with the flyover serving as the main western access point to the area. Designed by Katahira & Engineers Asia, actual construction of the flyover began in late 1997, starting with the segment between Gil Puyat Avenue and EDSA, contracted to the Uy-Pajara Construction Company. Work on the segment between Kalayaan Avenue and the Bonifacio Global City began in April 1999, with the work being contracted to F.F. Cruz and Co., one of the Philippines' largest construction companies. Capable of holding up to 4,000 vehicles at one time, the flyover would reduce travel times between Makati and the Bonifacio Global City to five minutes by providing a direct connection between the two business districts instead of needing to route vehicles through EDSA.

The 1.5-kilometer (0.93 mi) flyover was inaugurated by President Joseph Estrada and other government officials on January 25, 2000. Although promoted as a public project, it has been rumored that the ₱950 million spent for the flyover's construction did not come from public funds but was rather underwritten by the First Pacific group through their local subsidiary, Metro Pacific.

Despite being a flyover, the entire road is designated as National Route 191 (N191) of the Philippine highway network.

== Junctions ==
Province	City/Municipality	km	mi	Destinations	Notes
Makati				N190 (Gil Puyat Avenue)	Western terminus. Westbound exit and eastbound entrance.
Makati				AH 26 (N1) (EDSA) – Cubao, Guadalupe	Eastbound entrance
Makati				AH 26 (N1) (EDSA) – Ayala, Baclaran	Westbound entrance
Makati–Taguig boundary				N190 (Kalayaan Avenue) – C-5	Eastbound exit only
Taguig				N190 (Kalayaan Avenue) – Makati CBD	Westbound entrance only
Taguig				32nd Street	Eastern terminus. Westbound entrance and eastbound exit.
1.000 mi = 1.609 km; 1.000 km = 0.621 mi: Incomplete access
