= Nicanor Garcia Street =

Road in Makati, Philippines

Coordinates: 14°33′54″N 121°01′22″E

- Reposo Street
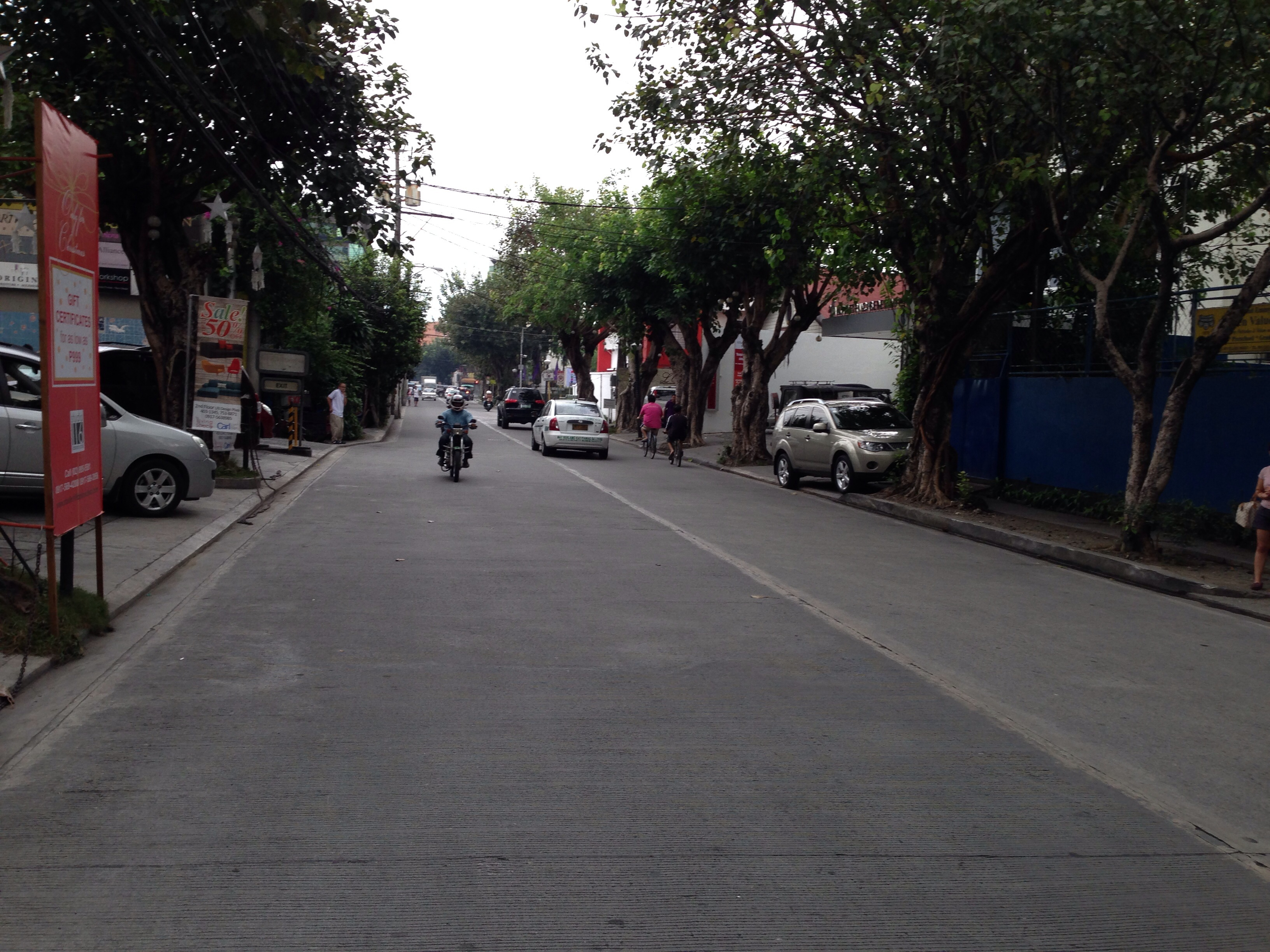
- The road as of 2013
- Interactive map of Nicanor Garcia Street
- Former names: Calle Reposo (before 1991); Calle Plesantero
- Namesake: Nicanor Garcia
- Length: 0.88 km (0.55 mi); Based on Google Maps
- Location: Makati, Metro Manila
- North end: J.P. Rizal Avenue in Poblacion and Valenzuela
- Major junctions: Kalayaan Avenue; Jupiter Street/Metropolitan Avenue
- South end: N190 (Gil Puyat Avenue) in Bel-Air

Nicanor Garcia Street, historically known as Calle Reposo or Reposo Street, is a street that runs several hundred meters north of Gil Puyat Avenue in Bel-Air Village, Makati, Metro Manila, Philippines. It crosses Jupiter Street/Metropolitan Avenue and Kalayaan Avenue, ending at J.P. Rizal Avenue along the barangay boundaries of Poblacion and Valenzuela. It has a short extension into Rizal Village, named Antipolo Street. The street is notable for its art galleries, interior design showrooms, and fine dining restaurants.

Nicanor Garcia forms the border between Bel-Air Village and the under-construction Makati Columbarium, which sits on the former Makati Catholic Cemetery, in barangay Valenzuela and between barangays Valenzuela and Poblacion. It was originally called Calle Reposo (Spanish for rest or repose) and Calle Plesantero (pleasant place) by earlier residents. Its origin traces back to an access road connecting the Makati Catholic Cemetery to the rest of Makati. In the 1990s, the road was renamed Nicanor Garcia Street after Nicanor F. Garcia, the first elected municipal mayor of Makati who served from 1922 to 1934.

An artists' association, "Grupo Reposo", composed of the street's gallery and store owners, holds an annual street art and culture festival on Nicanor Garcia Street. The group aims to make the old Calle Reposo an art center and the city's cultural hub.

== Landmarks ==
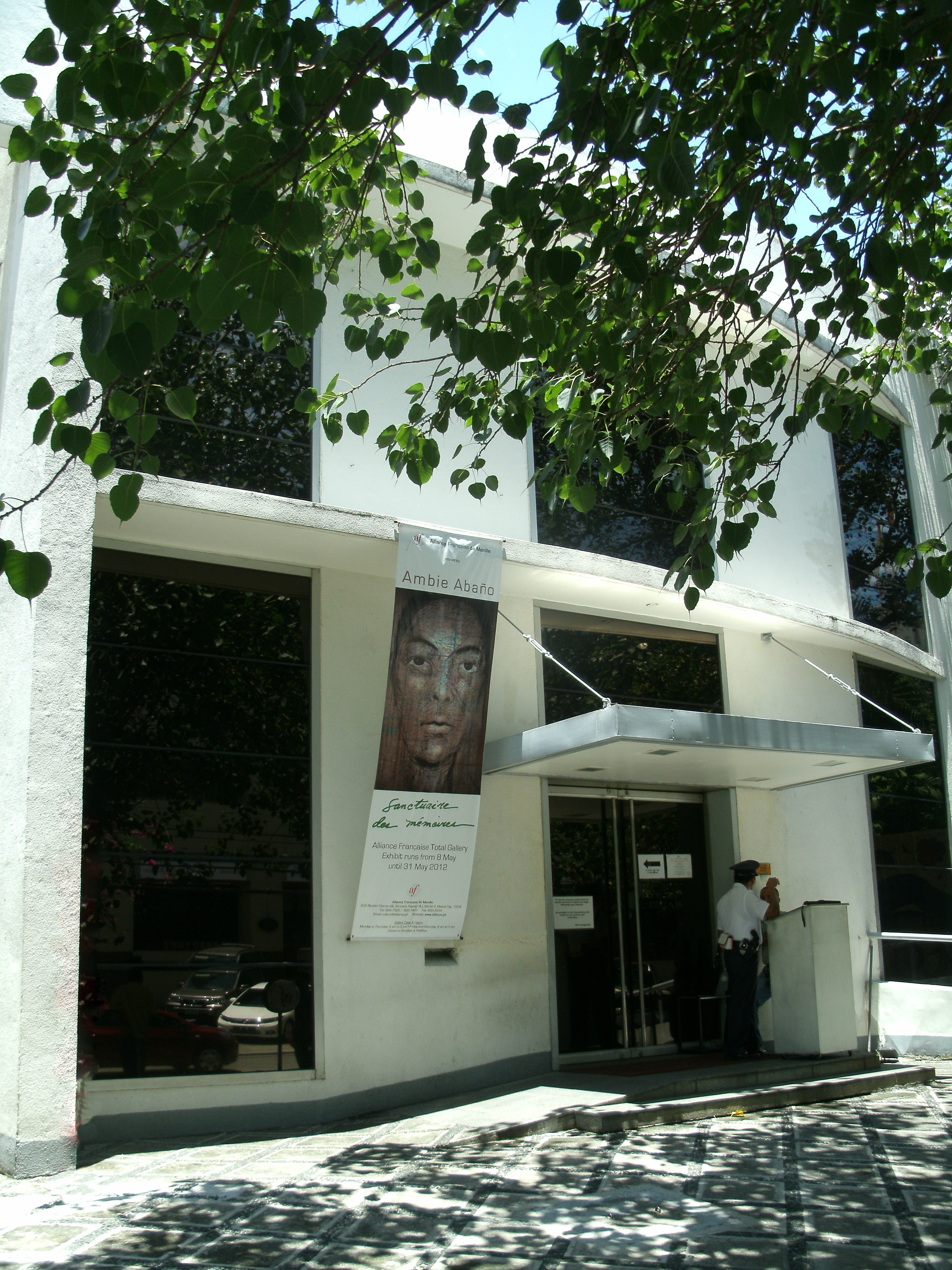
Alliance Française de Manille

- Alliance Française de Manille
- Caffe Maestro
- Caruso Ristorante Italiano
- Casa Ligna
- Jazz Residences
- Libertystile
- LRI Design Plaza
- Makati Catholic Cemetery graffiti
- Mapúa University Makati Campus (former site)
- PJL Commercial Center
- R Space Events Venue
- Ristorante L'Ambasciata d'Abruzzo
- St. Andrew the Apostle Parish
- SPi Global
