= Bel-Air, Makati =

Barangay in Makati, Metro Manila, Philippines

Bel-Air
- Barangay
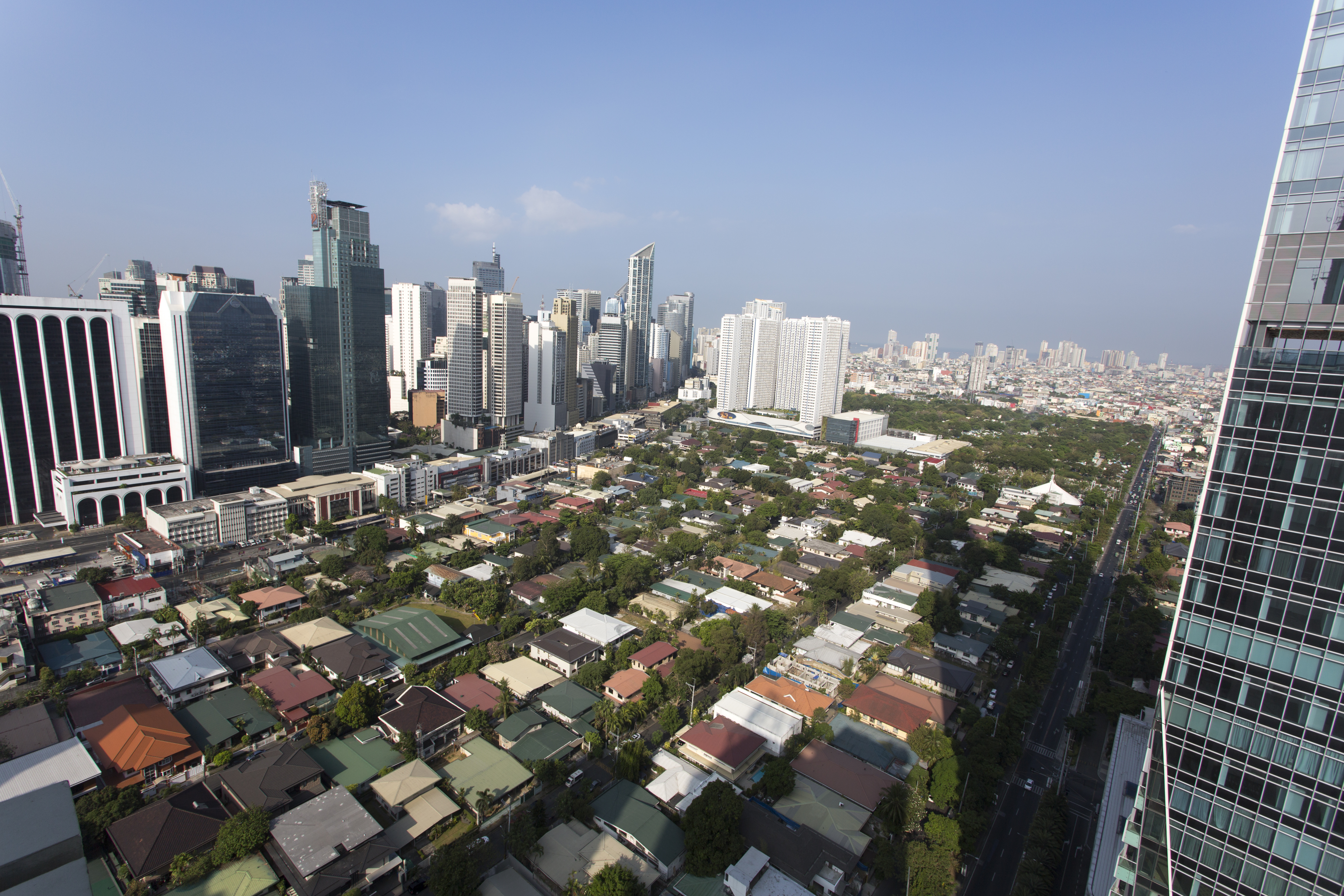
- Bel-Air Village Phase 2 with skyscrapers most of which are also part of the barangay in the background
- Interactive map of Bel-Air
- Coordinates: 14°33′50.16″N 121°1′34.83″E
- Country: Philippines
- Region: National Capital Region
- City: Makati
- District: Part of the 1st district of Makati

Government
  - Type: Barangay
  - Barangay Captain: Cynthia Cervantes
  - Barangay Councilors: Members: Milagros Alora; Joan Asuncion; Kevin Andrew Dionisio; Maria Carmen Guerzon; Ma. Bella Oposa; Paolo Romaldo Pagulayan; Vacant (Note: Vacant since the death of barangay councilor Constancia Lichauco on October 12, 2025.)
  - SK Chairperson: Christina Alexandra Camus

Area
  - Land: 1.712 km^{2} (0.661 sq mi)

Population (2020)
  - Total: 36,007
  - Density: 21,030/km^{2} (54,470/sq mi)
- Time zone: UTC+8 (PST)
- Postal Code: 1209 (Bel-Air Village); 1227 (Salcedo Village)
- Area code: 2
- PSGC: 137602002

Bel-Air refers to both a private subdivision, a gated community and a barangay in Makati, Philippines. To the north the village itself is bound by Kalayaan Avenue, Anza, Orion, Mercedes and Amapola Streets. Estrella Street on the northeast, Epifanio de los Santos Avenue on the southeast, Jupiter Street on the southwest and Nicanor Garcia Street (formerly Reposo) on the northwest. It encompasses a total land area of 171.2 hectares (423 acres) and is shaped roughly like a tobacco pipe.

Bel-Air Village was developed in four phases. The village is managed by the Bel-Air Village Association (BAVA). There are 950 lots, thirty-two streets and two well-developed parks in Phases 2 and 3, each with covered badminton/basketball courts. Makati Avenue separates Phase 2 from the rest of the subdivision.

Aside from Bel-Air Village, the barangay includes Ayala North, Gil Puyat Avenue (Buendia Avenue), the Ayala Triangle and the entire Salcedo Village of the Makati Central Business District.

== Etymology ==
Bel-Air is the chosen name by Capt. Antonio O'Brien, who was the president of the Airline Pilots' Association of the Philippines (ALPAP) at the time of the opening of Phase 1 in 1957. The village was intended to house pilots that are ALPAP members and, as a result, they preferred a name including the word "air."

== History ==
Drone view with Bel-Air Village Phase 2 on the foreground

In the early part of the 20th century, the area currently occupied by Bel-Air Village was part of the former Nielson Airport at Nielson Field on the old Hacienda de San Pedro Macati, then part of the province of Rizal. At that time, this airport and the Grace Park Airfield in Caloocan were the only commercial flight servers of Manila. The runways of Nielson Airport were wide and macadamized roads that are now the major thoroughfares known as Ayala Avenue and Paseo de Roxas. Philippine Airlines, which was then owned by Don Andres Soriano, Sr., operated domestic flights from Manila to Baguio and Paracale, with 9-passenger twin engine planes flown by American pilots.

During World War II, the United States Far East Air Force took control of the airport, leading to the suspension of all commercial flights. Subsequently, the airport was sequestered and repurposed as the Japanese military headquarters during the occupation. Following the liberation of Manila, control over the airport was returned to the Americans. Services resumed between 1945 and 1946 and continued until 1948 when the United States Air Force handed over Nichols Field to the Philippine government. Despite strong lobbying efforts by the Ayalas and Sorianos, President Manuel Roxas decided to shift all commercial air operations from Nielson to Nichols, where the present-day Ninoy Aquino International Airport is located.

This decision marked the most pivotal moment in the evolution of the Ayala-owned property. Col. Joseph McMicking, the spouse of Doña Mercedes de Ayala, then the major shareholder in the Ayala Corporation, envisioned a future financial, business, and commercial center, now the Makati Central Business District, surrounded by residential villages on the periphery of the now-vacant Nielson Airport.

In 1956, the Airline Pilots' Association of the Philippines (ALPAP), composed of over two hundred former Philippine Air Force and U.S. Air Force pilots, sought a subdivision from the Ayala Corporation. Through the efforts of Capt. Antonio O'Brien, the then-President of ALPAP and with the support of his friend Col. McMicking, Phase 1 of Bel-Air Village was inaugurated in 1957. The cost was set at the price of ₱15 (equivalent to ₱1,919 in 2021) per square meter for pilots and ₱30 (equivalent to ₱3,839 in 2021) per square meter for non-pilots. Officially, Bel-Air Village became the third subdivision developed by the Ayala Corporation.

Other than the Rizal Theater inside the Makati Commercial Center at the intersection of Makati and Ayala Avenues, there was not a single building along Buendia, Paseo de Roxas, Makati and Ayala Avenues. Given the vast area of cogon and talahib that were abundant in the area, only 100 pilots signed up and about 50-odd pilots erected houses. Others sold their rights at a significant profit.

From Capt. Charlie Deen's first residence at 2 Polaris Street corner Mars Street in Phase 2, Bel-Air Village expanded into four phases with more than 900 homeowners. Ms. Judith Deen, the widow of the first resident, along with her siblings, still resides in their 1957 house. Meanwhile, the widow of Capt. O'Brien, the former Philippine film actress Paraluman, recently relocated to their house at Polaris Street.

Bel-Air Village was registered and incorporated with the Securities and Exchange Commission in 1957. The deed restrictions for residential lots in the subdivision have been in force since January 15, 1957. These restrictions officially expired in 2007 but was later extended for another 25 years.

=== Recognition ===
As of 2005, Bel-Air was proclaimed the Cleanest and Greenest Barangay, Cluster I in the City of Makati, for the eighth record-breaking consecutive year. As a result, the barangay has been inducted into Makati's Clean and Green Hall of Fame.

== Community Services ==
The Bel-Air Village Community Center is located on 40 Solar Street, adjacent to the BAVA office, the Bel-Air Security Headquarters, Bel-Air III Park, and the barangay hall along Hydra Street. It hosts a clinic, the Bel-Air Post Office Extension, the Bel-Air Fitness Gym, and two function rooms for the use of village residents in good standing. Gym membership is open to residents and their visitors, with corresponding fees. Two covered badminton/basketball courts are located at the parks on Juno and Hercules Streets in Bel-Air II and on Solar Street in Bel-Air III.

Barangay Bel-Air offers other extension services such as free ambulance service through Lifeline Arrows, and the Continuing Education Program for English Proficiency for household help, security and maintenance personnel, in cooperation with the Department of Education and the Mapua Institute of Technology. More subjects like math and science will be offered in the future, in line with Makati's Non-Formal Education Program.

== Culture ==
Bel-Air Village's Pasinaya, which means thanksgiving, has been held annually since 1993 as a way of fostering community spirit and promoting camaraderie among its residents. The yearly celebration usually consists of a variety of events held during the month of April at the Bel-Air Phase 3 Park, featuring various food stalls, bazaars, entertainment, games and perya rides.

During the rest of the year, cultural events are organized to provide entertainment for the residents. For example, the Night of Music concert held on February 16, 2007, at the Bel-Air Multipurpose Court featured the Four Seasons Chamber Orchestra with Maestro Ali Delilah. This concert was presented in cooperation with the Italian Embassy, the Makati city government, the Department of Tourism and the National Commission for Culture and the Arts; sponsored by the Cultural Center of the Philippines and the Women of Bel-Air.
