= List of oldest buildings and structures in Metro Manila =

This article lists the oldest buildings and structures in Metro Manila, the Philippines that were constructed before 1900. Majority of the oldest extant buildings in the capital region are religious buildings built during the Spanish colonial period. Several buildings in the list have been reconstructed a few times with only a fraction of their original structures remaining. The buildings are sorted according to the year they were first built as inscribed on their historical markers installed by the National Historical Commission of the Philippines. The list excludes ruined buildings, monuments and road structures.

== 16th century ==
Building	Location	First Built	Inscription
Fort San Antonio Abad	Malate	1584	The origin of this fort dates from 1584. It was captured by the British in 1762 and rebuilt at the beginning of the nineteenth century, when it was called La Polvorista because it was used as powder magazine. The first battalion of the First Colorado Regiment, under the command of Lt. Col. McCoy, took possession of this fort and hoisted the American flag over it on August 13, 1898.
Fort Santiago	Intramuros	1593	Built of Guadalupe volcanic tuff by Governor Gómez Pérez Dasmariñas 1590–1593 in place of the wooden palisade of Raja Matanda.

== 17th century ==
Building	Location	First Built	Inscription
San Agustin Church	Intramuros	1607	Oldest stone church in the Philippines. Plans were approved in 1586. Construction started in 1587 and completed in 1607 under the supervision successively of Augustinian Fathers Francisco de Bustos, Ildefonso Pérez, Diego de Ávila and Brother Alfonso de Perea. Its architect was Juan Macias. It has withstood many earthquakes from 1645 up to the present and survived the British invasion in 1762, the Spanish–American War in 1898 and the Japanese invasion in 1942. The church choir has 68 carved molave seats with narra inlaids, an artistic lectern and parchment cantorals of the 17th and 18th centuries. The church and its graves were profaned during the British occupation of Manila in 1762. The ashes of early Spanish conquistadores Miguel López de Legazpi, Juan de Salcedo, Guido de Lavezaris, and Blessed Pedro de Zuñiga and others now rest in the easternmost chapel of the transept. Terms for the American occupation of Manila were prepared in the vestry of the church in 1898. The first Philippine plenary council was held here in 1953. Chosen as a World Heritage Site by UNESCO in 1993.
San Pedro Macati Church	Makati	1620	The Franciscans were the first missionaries here in 1578. The Jesuits built this church in 1620. Adjoining were the novitiate for the Jesuits and a house of retreat. Both the church and novitiate were dedicated to San Pedro in memory of the Rev. Pedro de los Montes, builder of the church, and of Captain Pedro de Britto, Regidor of Manila, who donated the site called Buenavista in 1607 and endowed the novitiate.
Nuestra Señora de Gracia Church	Makati	1629	The foundations of this church and monastery of the Augustinian Order were laid in 1601 and construction work was finished in 1629. Nuestra Señora de Guadalupe was chosen titular patroness in 1603. After the Chinese uprising of 1639, this sanctuary served as a seat of devotion for the Chinese. The buildings withstood the earthquakes of 1645, 1658, 1754 and 1863. The masonry roof of the church collapsed in the earthquakes of 1880 and the structure was rebuilt in 1882 by Rev. José Corujedo, O.S.A. Site of an orphan asylum and trade school administered by the Augustinian Order for the benefit of the children of the victims of the cholera of 1882. Both church and monastery were gutted by fire in 1899 during the early skirmishes between Americans and Filipinos.
Jesús de la Peña Chapel	Marikina	1630	At the former site of a warehouse now occupied by this church, the first mass was held on April 16, 1630, with the permission of Father Pedro de Arce, Bishop of Manila. The mass was held by Jesuit missionaries who discovered the image of Christ on a cliff and worshiped throughout the town of Jesus de la Peña which is now a village of Marikina.
Parañaque Cathedral	Parañaque	1638	The first Catholic missionary of Parañaque was the Rev. Diego de Espinal, O.S.A., companion of Salcedo in the reconnaissance of Camarines. The veneration for Nuestra Señora del Buen Suceso at Parañaque dates from 1625. The church and the convent were built by the Rev. Dionisio Suarez, O.S.A., parish priest from 1638 to 1650. This church was administered by the eminent historian, the Rev. Joaquín Martínez de Zuñiga, O.S.A. from 1801 to 1806. Parañaque is the birthplace of the Filipino botanist, the Rev. Ignacio Mercado, O.S.A.
Marikina Church	Marikina	1690	First built of thatch and bamboo by the Augustinian priests in Chorillo (now Barangka), 1572. Moved to Jesus de la Peña when the visita was transferred under the supervision of the Jesuit priests, 1630. The first mass was inaugurated and held, April 16, 1630. It was again relocated to its present site, 1687. The stone church was completed and became a parish, 1690. A large portion of the church was burned down during the Philippine Revolution and the Philippine–American War. Its belfry was damaged during World War II. The church was renovated in 1951 by the parish priest with the help of citizens, religious and civic organizations.
Santuario de San Pedro Bautista	Quezon City	1699	The site was donated to the Franciscans on February 17, 1590 by Governor Santiago de Vera in the name of King Philip II. Chapels were built of thatch and bamboo in 1590, of wood in 1593, and of volcanic tuff in 1599. The last was badly damaged in the Chinese uprising of 1639. Present church built from 1696 to 1699, through the generosity of Tomás de Endaya. To this site retired for prayer and recollection several Franciscans who suffered martyrdom in Japan in the 17th century and others who led missionary expeditions to Japan, China and Cambodia. The escuela serafica or probation school for Filipino applicants to the Franciscan order was opened here July 16, 1931.

== 18th century ==
Building	Location	First Built	Inscription
Santa Ana Church	Santa Ana	1725	First Franciscan mission established outside Manila in 1578. Present church built under the supervision of Vicente Ingles, O.F.M. Cornerstone laid on September 12, 1720 by Francisco de la Cuesta, Archbishop of Manila and acting Governor of the Philippines.
Pasig Cathedral	Pasig	1760	The first Catholic Missionary of Pasig was Rev. Alonso de Alvarado, companion of Ruy López de Villalobos in his expedition in the Moluccas. The first church was built in 1575. The present one was used by the British for military purposes in their campaign against the military forces of Simón de Anda y Salazar.
Santuario del Santo Cristo	San Juan	1774	The church and convent were built in 1602–1604 by the Dominican Province of the Most Holy Rosary on a site donated by Capitan Julian de Cuenca. Both buildings were burned during the Chinese uprising of 1639. The new church and convent, constructed in 1641, were set on fire in July 1763 during the British occupation of Manila. The present church and convent, constructed in 1774, were used by the insurgent forces of the Philippine Revolution of 1898. This sanctuary is the seat of the Confraternity of Santísimo Cristo de San Juan del Monte approved by Pope Innocent X on March 4, 1648.
San Lazaro Hospital	Santa Cruz	1784	Founded as dispensary in Intramuros by Fray Juan Clemente, 1577. Became hospital, 1578. Taken over by the Hermandad de la Misericordia, 1596. Transferred to new building at the premises of the Philippine Normal College becoming the San Lazaro Hospital, 1631. Turned over to the Hermanos de San Juan de Diós, May 16, 1656. Building demolished for the protection of the city against the invasion of Chinese pirates, 1662. Transferred to another building nearby constructed by Fray Fernando de la Concepción, 1675. Moved to a building in the present compound, 1784. Enlarged, 1785. Further improved by Fray Felix de Huerta who built a chapel and enclosed the premises with stone wall, 1859. Taken over by the Americans, 1898. It became a contagious disease hospital.

== 19th century ==
Building	Location	First Built	Inscription
Las Piñas Church	Las Piñas	1819	Established as a pueblo, 1762. Separated from the parish of Parañaque, 1775. P. Diego Cera de la Virgen del Carmen appointed first resident parish priest, December 26, 1795. The stone church was erected, 1797–1819. He created the bamboo organ from 902 bamboo tubes and 129 tin cans, 1816–1824. Slightly damaged by the earthquakes of 1828 and 1863. After the 1880 earthquakes, the church was temporarily abandoned. It was renovated in 1883 but had not been fully repaired. It was used as a concentration camp during the Japanese occupation and as a hospital during the Liberation. Restored to its former use through a joint effort by the parish community and the Historical Conservation Society, 1962–1977.
Malate Church	Malate	1864	This section of the city dates back to 1588. The titular patroness of this church is Nuestra Señora de los Remedios, whose statue was brought from Spain in 1624 by Rev. Juan Guevara, O.S.A. The British landed their troops near these shores in 1762 and used the church of Malate for protection for their rear-guard in the capture of Manila. This church was greatly damaged by the earthquake of June 3, 1863, and was rebuilt by Rev. Francisco Cuadrado, O.S.A. The parish has been under the successive administration of the Augustinians, the secular clergy, the Redemptorists, and the Columbans.
Tondo Church	Tondo	1880	The first Catholic minister of Tondo was the Rev. Alonso de Alvarado, O.S.A. Tondo was the residence of Lakan-Dula who was baptized by the Rev. Martin de Rada, O.S.A. In the early days, its ecclesiastical jurisdiction extended up to Pasig, Cainta and Taytay. Tondo was an active center of Catholic activities among the Chinese. The former convent was demolished in 1662 by Governor Sabiniano Manrique de Lara as a military precaution against the expected attack on Manila by Kue-Sing. The present church was built by the Rev. Manuel Diez, O.S.A. and the Rev. Casimiro Herrero, O.S.A. in the second half of the 19th century. Since the early days, the traditional fluvial procession of Santo Niño has attracted thousands of visitors to Tondo.
San Sebastian Church	Quiapo	1891	Designed by Genaro Palacios. The structural metal of which this church is uniquely built was manufactured in Belgium and erected here by Belgian engineers. The church was solemnly blessed August 16, 1891. Earlier churches built on this site by Recollect friars since 1611 were destroyed by earthquake in 1859, 1863 and 1880.
Tutuban station	Tondo	1892	Preparation of general plan for railroad on Luzon authorized by royal decree, June 26, 1875. Royal approval of Don Eduardo López Navarro's plan, May 11, 1883. Concession for the Manila–Dagupan line awarded to Don Edmundo Sykes, January 21, 1887, and later transferred to the Manila Railroad Company Ltd. of London. Corner stone of the main station building at Tutuban laid July 31, 1887. Entire Manila–Dagupan line, 195 kilometers long, completed and service inaugurated November 24, 1892.
Don Roman Santos Building	Santa Cruz	1894	The building was occupied by Caja Ahorros y Monte de Piedad between 1894 and 1937. It was purchased and expanded by the Consolidated Investments Corporation and resold to the Magdalena Estate in 1944. Transformed into a hospital by American Red Cross, 1945–1947 . Roman R. Santos purchased it in 1955 and was occupied by the Prudential Bank and Trust Company and trading offices. Its renovation was completed in 1957.
Pinaglabanan Church	San Juan	1896	Designed and built by architect Luis Arellano in 1896 with the help of Mariano Artiaga and Martín Ocampo. Destroyed during the revolution; Restored by Ramón J. Fernández after the Philippine-American war and became the parish of San Juan. The church was enlarged and renovated in 1951 under the leadership of parish priest, P. Hernando Antiporda. The improvement was made by architect Otilio A. Arellano who worked hard to maintain its original nave and façade.
Taguig Church	Taguig	1896	Augustine priests established the parish under the patronage of the patron saint of Santa Ana. The first parish priest P. Diego Álvarez built and erected the first stone church in 1587. It was destroyed by the earthquake, 1645, and rebuilt by P. Andrés Díaz, 1848. It was damaged by another earthquake, 1882, and was rebuilt by P Guillermo Díaz, 1886–1896. The church was renovated by Rt. Rev. Msgr. Augurio I. Juta, 1980–1985, and by Msgr. Emmanuel V. Sunga, 1985–1987. Presented to the Lord by the Honorable Bishop Bruno Torpigliani, Apostolic Nuncio in the Philippines, in commemoration of the 400th anniversary of the parish, July 25, 1987.

== See also ==
- List of Cultural Properties of the Philippines in Metro Manila
- List of historical markers of the Philippines in Metro Manila
- List of Roman Catholic churches in Metro Manila
