= Jose Francisco Syquia =

Filipino Roman Catholic exorcist

Rev. Fr. Francisco Syquia

Personal life
- Born: Jose Francisco Syquia
- Home town: Makati

Religious life
- Religion: Roman Catholicism
- Profession: Exorcist
- Ordination: 2000

Senior posting
- Present post: Director, Archdiocese of Manila Office on Exorcism

Jose Francisco "Jocis" Syquia is a Filipino Roman Catholic exorcist. He is the director of the Archdiocese of Manila Office on Exorcism.

== Early life and education ==
Francisco Syquia was born to a wealthy family in Forbes Park, Makati. His parents were diplomat Enrique Syquia and his wife Leticia. He was the second of five sons. The siblings grew up not believing in demons and exorcism, but Francisco developed an interest in the paranormal. Francisco expressed a desire to become a priest as early as when he was still a third grade elementary student before such aspiration was placed on hold.

Sometime during the administration of President Ferdinand Marcos, he would get involved in political activism. He would also dabble in New Age beliefs and practices, explore other religions, and "open his third eye". He planned to become a lawyer but leaned back to his faith, Roman Catholicism, after he says he experienced demonic attacks. Syquia said that the demonic attacks and nightmares would stop after eight months and that a year later he entered the seminary. He would obtain a master's degree in psychology at a Catholic university prior to his ordination.

== Ministry ==
Syquia was ordained a priest in 2000. He would be granted faculty by Bishop Teodoro Buhain to practice exorcism in 2003 when he was still a newly assigned priest at the Quiapo Church in Manila. He was hesitant at first due to his past experiences and wanted to quit within the first two years. He was then the only exorcist in the Philippines. He would read a publication by Vatican chief exorcist Gabriele Amorth which led him to start attending courses on exorcism in Rome beginning in 2008.

He would also become the chief exorcist of the Archdiocese of Manila Office of Exorcism (AMOE). AMOE is part of the Lay Formation Center of the San Carlos Pastoral Formation Complex in Makati which was founded in 2006.

Syquia and his team would diagnose exorcisms in Latin. He believes that people who are experiencing spiritual, emotional, or familial relational crises are vulnerable to demonic possessions. Syquia had advised caution regarding the use of social media and the internet. He alleged that electronic gadgets have been used by the devil in actual exorcism rites.

With encouragement from Cardinal Luis Antonio Tagle, the Archdiocese of Manila set up the Saint Michael Center for Spiritual Liberation and Exorcism. Syquia, along with Manila Archbishop Cardinal Jose Advincula, led the groundbreaking ceremony in May 2022.

Cardinal Jose Advincula has appointed Syquia as the parochial vicar of Nuestra Señora de Gracia Church in Makati. He was installed on August 1, 2024.
