= 1880 Southern Luzon earthquakes =

1880 earthquakes in Southern Luzon, Philippines

- Location within Luzon Location within Philippines
- Local date: July 18, 1880; July 20, 1880
- Local time: 12:40; 15:40; 22:50
- Duration: 70 seconds 45 seconds 35 seconds
- Magnitude: 7.0 M_{w}; 7.6 M_{w}; 7.2 M_{w}
- Depth: 2 km (1 mi)
- Epicenter: 14°0′40″N 120°59′50″E
- Fault: Philippine Fault
- Type: Strike-slip
- Areas affected: Manila, Tayabas (now Quezon Province)
- Total damage: Building collapsed, casualties
- Max. intensity: RFS X (Extremely high intensity tremor); MMI XI (Extreme)
- Tsunami: None
- Landslides: Yes
- Foreshocks: 5.0 M_{ww}, 4.9 M_{ww}
- Aftershocks: 1,900 (833 felt) including 6.2 M_{ww} Aftershock
- Casualties: Unknown

The 1880 Southern Luzon earthquakes, were one of the most destructive tremors on record in the history of the country. The shocks continued, with greater or less interruption, from July 14–25, 1880; highlighted by three violent quakes measuring M_{w} 7.0, M_{w} 7.6, and M_{w} 7.2 respectively. The sequence destroyed churches and other buildings, producing loss of life. Coinciding with the tectonic activity was an increase in volcanic activity in the Taal Volcano of southwestern Luzon.

Manila, together with the provinces of Cavite, Bulacan, Laguna, Pampanga, and Nueva Ecija were the chief victims from the convulsions, with Manila and Laguna receiving the full brunt of the quakes. In many places, buildings were converted into shapeless heaps of ruins, and the materials of their prosperity buried beneath the rubbish.

== Chronology of events ==
=== Initial vibrations ===
The vibrations began during the months of April and May, in the northern provinces of Luzon. The center of oscillation, as indicated by the directions registered at Manila, appears to coincide with a volcano, which has been long extinct, situated between Lepanto (now part of Kalinga) and Abra provinces, in the Central Cordillera of Luzon, in latitude 16° 22' N and longitude 127° E, according to the Spanish Observatory of San Fernando. At first the movements were weak and little frequent, but in the month of June they became quite intense, and extended from north to south over a large zone. This direction never changed; and the few discordances recorded appear to have been a result of haste or want of care in the method of taking the observations, exactness being hardly attainable without special instruments for the purpose.

Taal Volcano was observed to start showing increase in activity from June 8 and sometimes at night the crater was covered with glare.

Early in July some vibrations were felt, but from the 5th to the 14th none were recorded at Manila or any point on the island. On July 14 at 12:53 p.m., as a storm from the northeast of Luzon was threatening as indicated by an extraordinary fall of the barometer, the first shock occurred. After this first tremor, there were two more shocks at the end of an hour and a half. On the 15th and 16th no perceptible shocks occurred; and on the 17th, only two small shocks.

=== July 18, Sunday ===
On the 18th at 12:40 p.m., occurred the first great shock described as one of oscillation, also of "trepidation," and spoken of commonly at the time as one of rotation. Its duration was 70 seconds. The people immediately ran for places of security, and those in the streets were filled with confusion, Some ran without a fixed direction; others fell on their knees, giving forth fearful cries. The sight presented by the city was frightful in the extreme; for seventy mortal seconds the city was in oscillation, and the inclinations threatened to raze to the ground the creaking edifices; the noise of the falling buildings increased the general panic.

The first shocks were slight, which gave time for people to run out of the houses to places of security accounting for lesser loss of life. The quake also happened on a Sunday, the public and private establishments being closed, permitted the families to be collected. Had the earthquake happened at night with the majority using lamp with kerosene oil, nothing could have stopped a fallen lamp from spreading fire to a fallen building.

In Manila, among the buildings which sustained damage on the 18th, was the Mint House, which suffered considerably in the first story. Orders were given to pull down the buildings which threatened any danger to the pedestrians, and engineers were going around surveying the buildings, examining the interior of the dwellings, ordering out the inhabitants where danger existed. The pillars supporting some of the wooden houses were found forced into the earth by one-fourth of their length.

From then on, small tremors continued throughout the day. The frightened, terrified look of the people going through the streets, the slightest noise being sufficient to startle and set every soul running out of the houses to the middle of the streets, and to the squares, every slight shock of the earth strikes terror into the soul of every one, each and every one expecting unheard-of calamity. Whole families were emigrating from the city to the country on a large scale.

The view during the earthquake from the vessels in the Pasig River, was, as described by an eyewitness, something to be seen to be appreciated. The rocking to and fro of the buildings was something terrific, the vessels moving about and bumping each other as though in a heavy seaway; the water of the river, bubbling up and mixed with the black mud of the river, was all the colour of ink; hundreds of people rushed off to the ships and remained all night. In Manila Bay, the same bubbling appearance was observable on the water, and the shock was distinctly felt on board the ships; the water's depth close in shore had been shallowed by some four feet in some places.

In Lingayen, Pangasinan, some 200 kilometers (120 mi) north of Manila, the earthquake occurred at 12:42 p.m., reported as violent, oscillating NE to SE, with a duration of 1 minute 50 seconds accompanied by deep subterranean noise. In Santa Cruz, Laguna province, 60 kilometers (37 mi) SE of Manila, the shock was also felt at 12:42 p.m. and continued for more than a minute. The Government House, the Convent, the Telegraphic Office and the rest of the province formed a single mass of ruins. In Tayabas, Tayabas province, the oscillation continued for 2 minutes and 30 seconds.

==== Strange phenomenon in Cavite ====
On the occasion of the earthquake, the people in Cavite across the bay saw Manila enveloped in a dense cloud of dust, and thought that Manila was completely destroyed. A very interesting phenomenon was also observed in Cavite. During the intensity of the earthquake, in the anchorage of Cavite, columns of black mud were seen to burst up, with a strong smell of sulphur. The very interesting phenomenon was also observed in Manila a few days previous to the destructive earthquake of 1863, in front of the Colgante suspension bridge on Pasig River. A column of blackish water was seen to burst up, which attracted the attention of the people. In 1869, the same phenomenon occurred in Manila, then also previous to an earthquake.

In Cañacao, Cavite and a few other places crevices were opened, and from them fine sand and dirty water were ejected. In one of these crevices that opened in Nueva Ecija, the crack was so wide and deep it was reported that an old man and a boy disappeared in it.

The day after, July 19 in the afternoon, Taal Volcano started issuing large mass of smoke, according to a telegraphic news from Taal, Batangas.

=== July 20, Tuesday ===
From that first shock on July 18, there was an uninterrupted series of small shocks which continued until July 20 at 3:40 p.m., when then occurred a repetition of extraordinary violence, with movements of oscillation and trembling ("trepidation") lasting 45 seconds. The earth shook again reducing to complete ruins the buildings partially destroyed and damaged buildings being secured, startling many workmen who were engaged in the reconstructing the city. Clouds of dust covered the whole town in a few seconds afterwards and obscuring the view of everything.

As soon as the earthquake ceased, the authorities turned out into the streets, amongst whom the first were the Governor-General, the Archbishop and General Director of the Civil Administration, the Civil Governor, and the Colonial Secretary, giving to every one who saluted them a consoling word.

Crevices were opened in several places, and among them the Plaza de Palacio. Numerous buildings have sustained damage, some of them completely razed to the ground. The highest buildings suffered most, such as churches, palaces, and towers. The belfry of the Manila Cathedral that survived the great 1863 earthquake fell in.

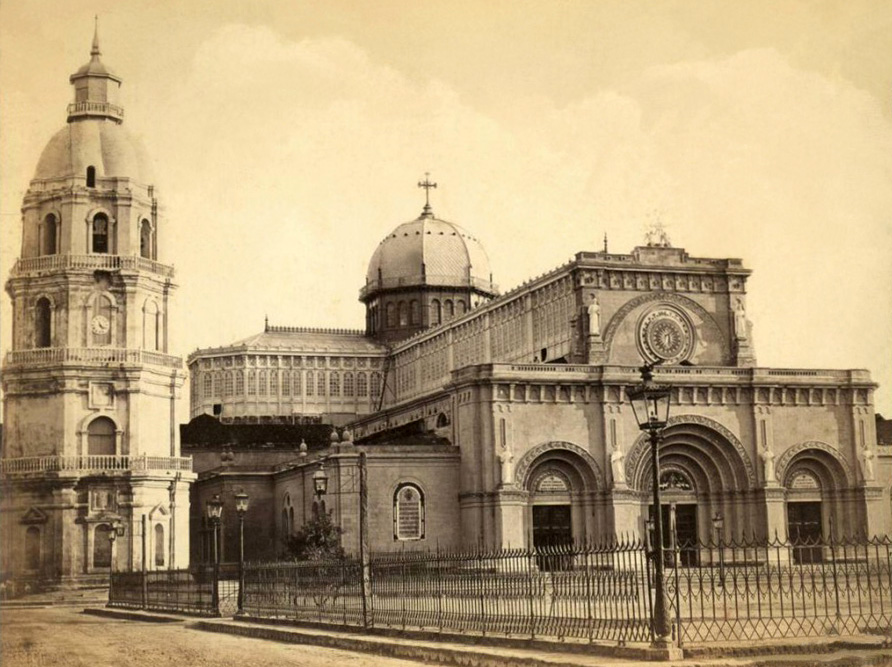
The newly reconstructed Manila Cathedral, destroyed by the 1863 earthquake, with the surviving belfry from the previous cathedral.

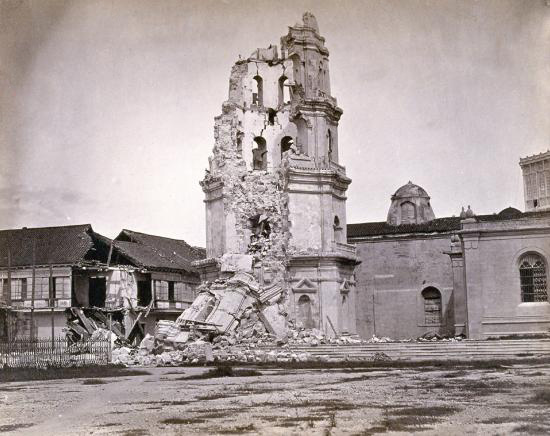
The belfry destroyed in the afternoon of July 20, 1880.

Telegraphic news from the provinces was received, giving the time and strength of the shock felt at each place. In Biñan, Laguna province, the church, court house, and all the brick houses were destroyed.

One circumstance as a precursor of tranquility was the eruption of the Taal Volcano, which was ignited the day before, sending forth a large quantity of smoke, a fact which may be regarded as a favorable change in the geological state.

=== July 20 evening quake ===
With those ever-present movements of trepidation at short intervals, the pendulum continued oscillating during all the evening in a NE and SW direction. At 10:40 p.m. occurred the third violent repetition, which lasted 55 seconds; the violence of earthquake was even greater than that afternoon of the 20th. It was also greater than that of the 18th.

The state of the city and the whole provinces of Luzon, where all the brick buildings, together with some of the wooden houses with metallic roofs, sustained damage of more or less consideration, and with especially those of Manila which were in a complete ruin.

The Governor-General sent by telegraph the details of the earthquake of the 18th on the afternoon of the 20th to Spain, but as soon as that was forwarded, the terrific earthquake of the 20th was felt at 3:40 p.m., owing to which he began to telegraph anew, after going through the streets to infuse peace into the minds of the inhabitants with his presence.

With the shocks of the night of the 20th, the part of the bell tower of the old Cathedral that was still standing, came almost completely to the ground, the debris falling upon two adjoining houses which had been rendered uninhabitable for the last two days.

In Santa Ana, Manila, all the brick houses came to the ground, some of them built at great expense, and with iron roofs. The church was rendered useless, and a mass was said the day before in the middle of the field by all the residents.

From the port city of Cavite, large numbers of inhabitants abandoned their houses to go to the neighboring village of San Roque in view of the security offered by houses of light construction. The panic is great, and terror is painted in all faces. Those who could not leave contented themselves by living in lower houses, fearing a repetition of the earthquake. In Cañacao, the public buildings sustained more or less damage, and in some places boiling water was poured forth from crevices in the earth opened by the shocks. In a place called Sapa, in the village of Pandacan in Manila, several crevices were opened, some of two palms wide, from which a kind of clay was thrown out; the day before these crevices were somewhat reduced in width.

According to the opinion of persons from the Manila Observatory run by the Jesuits, the center of the great geological commotion of the last few days was described as covering Manila and Laguna especially. In the rest of the provinces the effect was believed to be of smaller consideration.

The greatest portion of the private establishments, both inside and outside the walls of Manila were closed and the sight was a mournful one to contemplate; very few pedestrians were to be seen, and the carriage traffic was considerably reduced. Many local families passed the night of the 20th in the fields and public grounds, some of them being exposed to the rain which fell at daylight.

A pastoral letter was published by the Archbishop of Manila of that time, Fray Pedro Payo, infusing consolation and devotion into the people asking them to practice penitence in order to decrease the anger of God. According to this pastoral, a mass was to be celebrated in the camp of Bagumbayan on the 22nd, to which the army and navy, public officers, would have to be present by order of the Governor General.

=== July 22, Thursday ===
Vibrations continued, but there was a marked diminution in frequency and intensity. A reassuring wire from the Jesuit Fathers regarding the earthquake reported that the commotions continue, but it is observed in them a sensible decrease in the shortness of the intervals as well as in the intensity of the shocks. The pendulum of the seismometer, which had not been quiet since the 18th up to 3 p.m. of the 21st, that morning and evening had been several times in complete quietness. From the 21st in the morning, the state of Taal volcano has improved and presumed returning to its normal condition, as reported from Lipa.

The mass in Bagumbayan camp took place this day. The ceremony was imposing in the extreme, after which the Pastoral Benediction and a sermon followed. The congregation dispersed in processional form.

A petition was sent to the Secretary of State for the Colonies by wire, requesting an increase in the public works staff to give a greater impulse to the works of reconstruction.

An immense number of residents sought refuge afloat on board the steamers in the bay and in the port, and also in every insignificant vessel in the harbor during the shakings. In the Cadiz alone there are no less than twenty families, with some forty or more children; some forty people were in the Churruca, and as many in the Elcano; eighty in the Salvadora. Even in the dredging vessel five or six families found refuge shortly after the violent trepidation of the 20th and several more in the lorcha and boats.

=== July 23 thereafter ===
The seismometer pendulum at the Manila Observatory, which had not been quiet since the 18th until 3 p.m. of the 21st, was motionless for long intervals in the three following days. On the 25th, at 4:02 a.m., another shock was felt. It was of feeble intensity, yet of interest since the record bears evidence as to the gradual change in the center of seismic radiation which had been in progress.

== Taal Volcano ==
Beginning June 8, Taal Volcano was observed to be more active than normal, and sometimes at night the crater was covered with a glare. From July 17 to 21, subterranean noises were heard, and many witnesses in Talisay, a town located along the shores of Taal Lake some 6 miles (9.7 km) distant from Volcano Island, reported small balls of fire (apparently about 2.5 feet (0.76 m) in diameter) appeared periodically above the crater. These balls after reaching a considerable height burst into small fragments, some of which fell back into the crater and the remainder upon the exterior slope. This increased in activity and eruption of July 20 though is not accounted as an eruption of Taal Volcano based on the eruption history of Taal.

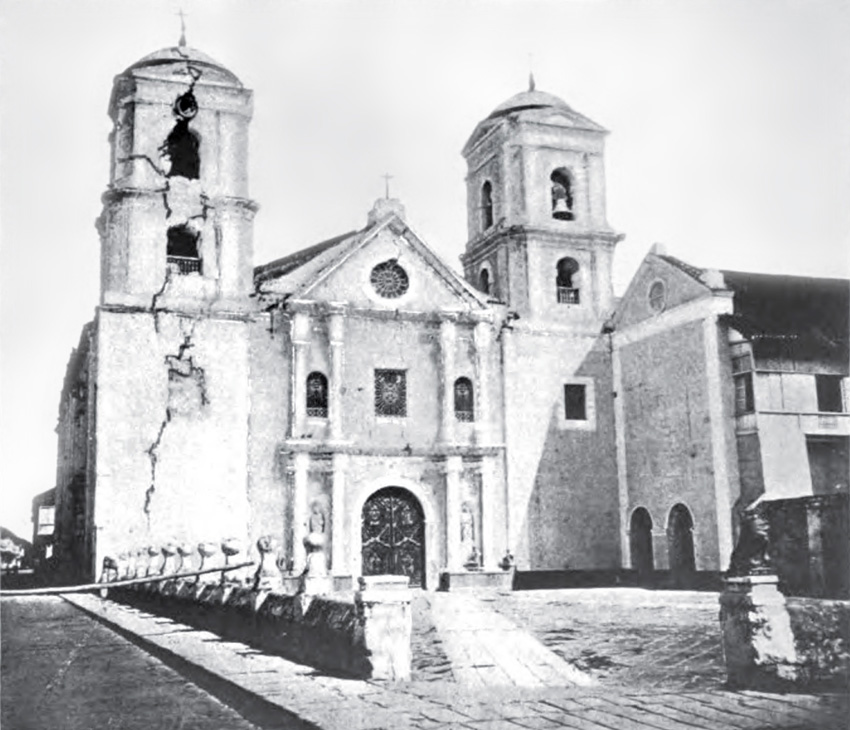
San Agustin Church in Manila, which survived the great earthquakes of 1645 and 1863, was severely damaged by the tremors of 1880.

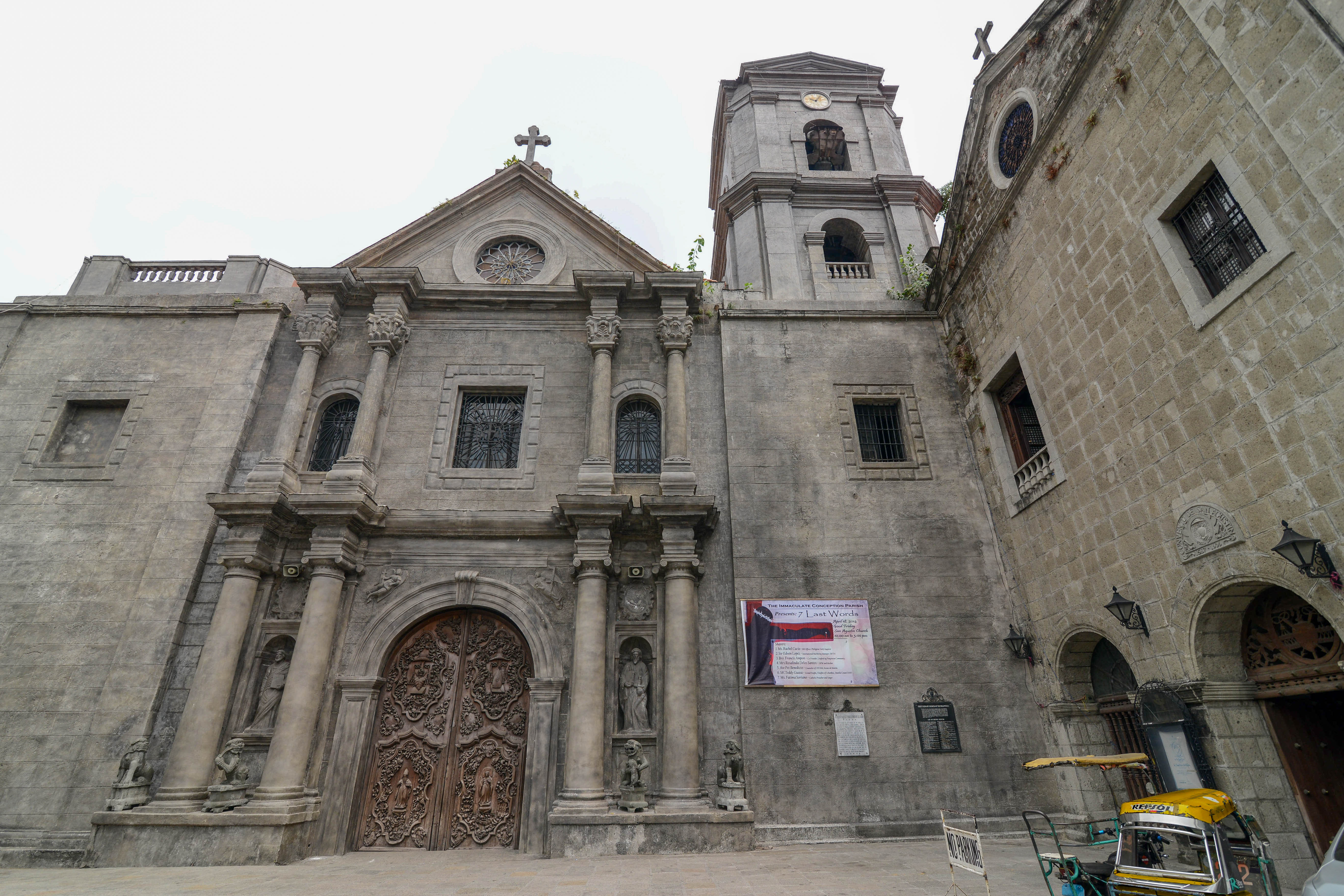
The earthquake changed San Agustin into a single-belfry church.

== Other observations ==
The severest shocks seem to have been felt over the whole island of Luzon about 400 miles (640 km) North to South, and 200 miles (320 km) East to West. From observations taken it seems that the difference in the time between the extreme points was not more than ten minutes.

It appears that at the time of the great shock on the 18th, it was ebb tide; and the water in the Pasig River suddenly rose 3.5 feet (1.1 m), and almost as suddenly fell again. Thousands of fish were found lying on the surface of the water in the bay.

It was calculated that the top of a building thirty feet from the ground was thrown 5 feet (1.5 m) out of its perpendicular; and one of the towers of the cathedral oscillated over 20 feet (6.1 m).

In one of the provinces, the local houses, which are built of bamboo and thatch, were sent flying; that canoes were thrown out of the water; and the growing rice torn out of the ground. The earth sunk in many places, the bed of one river had sunk 6 feet (1.8 m). Great chasms, 10 to 12 feet (3.0 to 3.7 m) wide and of immense depth, were ripped in the earth.

The Catholic churches of Guadalupe, Paco, Pandacan, Santa Ana, San Sebastian and San Miguel were in ruins. Within the walls of Manila the San Augustin Church, San Francisco Church and Santo Domingo Church were very seriously damaged. The Landnay barracks were down and the soldiers took refuge in one of the cigar factories. The barracks near the Luneta went down and the men built nipa huts there.

== Aftermath ==
After the earthquakes of 1880 a commission composed of engineers of public works was appointed to study the ruins caused by these earthquakes, to point out the defects in the structure of the buildings that had been damaged, and to formulate rules which would be more practical than the ones previously drawn up for the rebuilding and repairing of the city. Jose Centeno, engineer of mines, was entrusted with this task. His memoir, Temblores de tierra occuridos en Julio de 1880 en la Isla de Luzon, is one of the best that has been published from a descriptive point of view. He personally covered the whole territory in which these earthquakes had been most violent, and hence was able to determine, with the precision possible in such cases, the meizoseismic areas of the three destructive earthquakes that took place from July 14 to 21.

Reconstruction of the city was undertaken by civil engineers who adopted the traditional combination formula, while adapting this to the adverse seismic conditions. It was recommended that the ground floor of buildings should be constructed using a timber framework with multiple ties and that the external walls should be brick-built. Heavy roofing made from tiles was discouraged in favor of the new lighter galvanized iron.

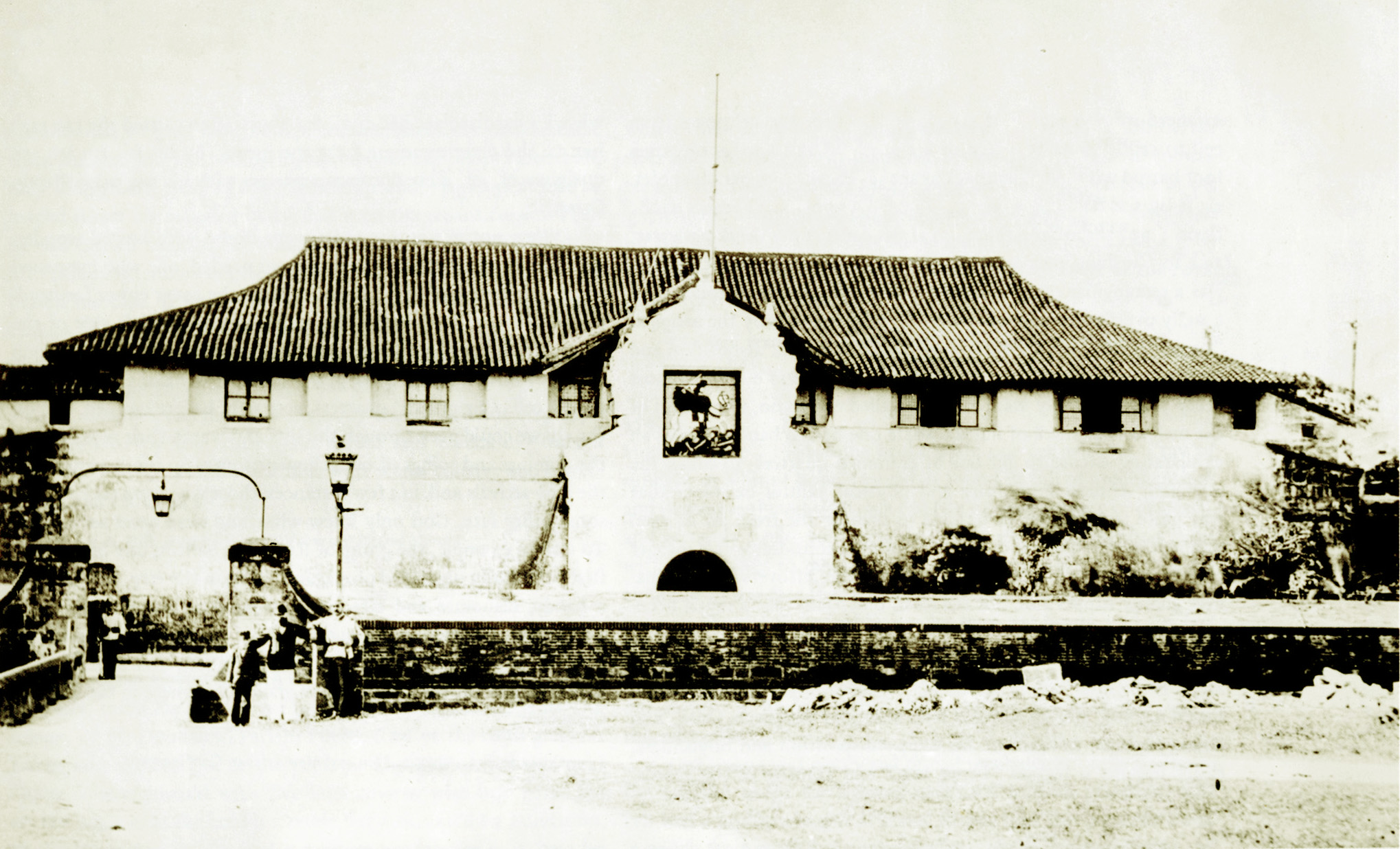
The front structure of Fort Santiago in Manila with tiled roof before it was destroyed by the earthquake of 1880.

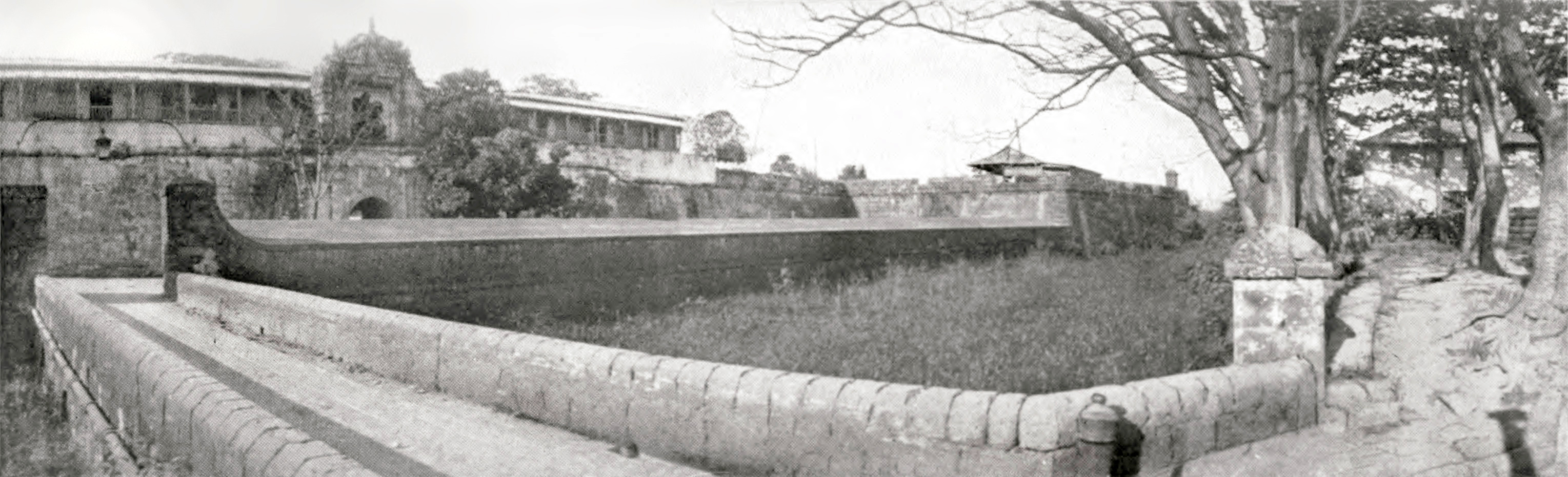
The reconstructed structure with galvanized iron roof in 1903.

== See also ==
- List of earthquakes in the Philippines
- List of historical earthquakes
