= San Pedro Macati Church =

Roman Catholic church in Makati, Philippines

- Saints Peter and Paul Parish Church
- Makati Church; Sampiro Church
- Ecclesia Parœcialis de S. Petri Apostoli in urbs v.d. Makati (Latin)
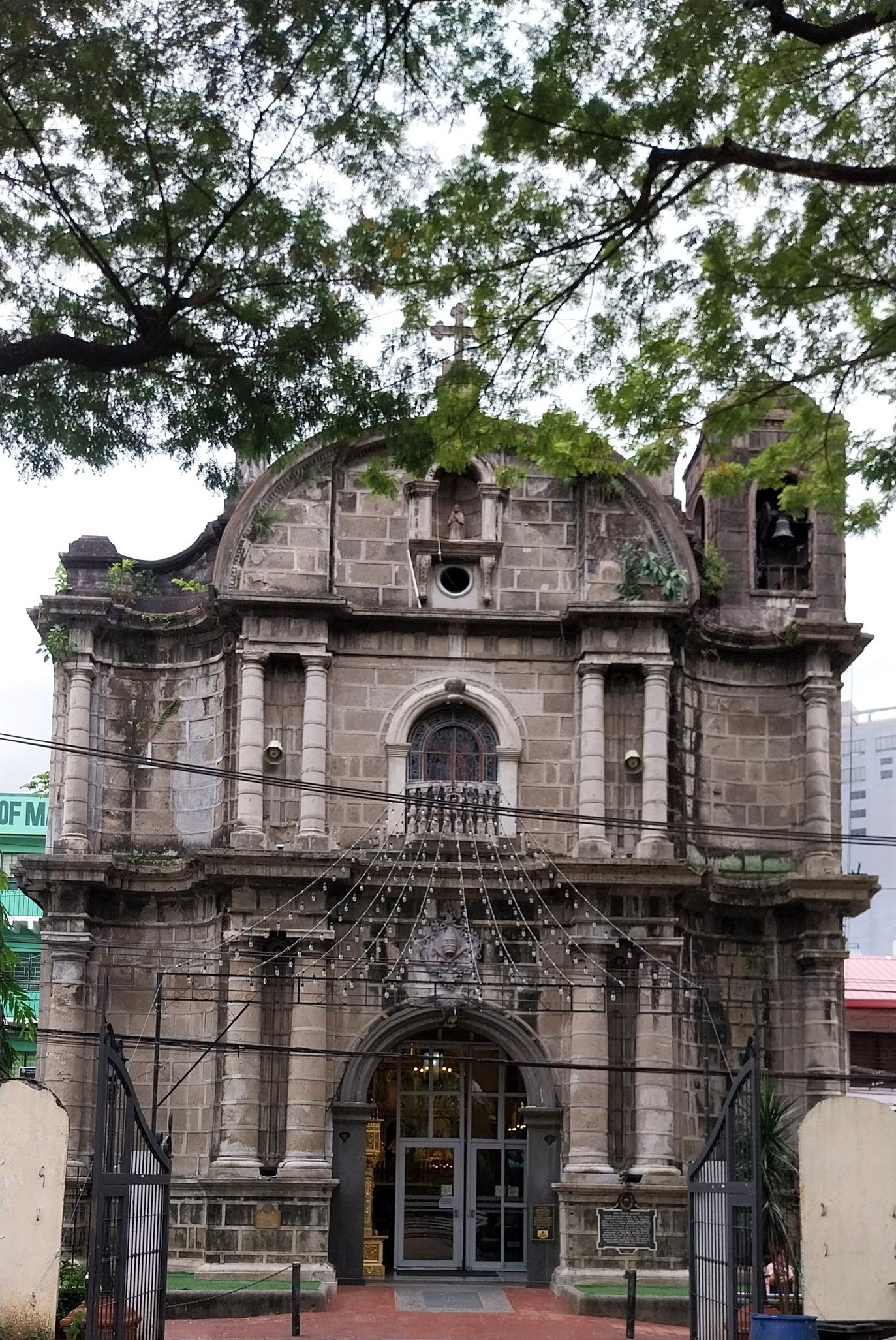
- Church facade in 2025
- San Pedro Macati Church
- 14°33′58″N 121°01′53″E
- Location: 5539 D.M. Rivera Street; Poblacion, Makati, Metro Manila
- Country: Philippines
- Denomination: Roman Catholic

History
- Status: Parish church
- Founded: 1620
- Founder: Pedro de los Montes
- Dedication: Saints Peter and Paul
- Dedicated: January 30, 2015

Architecture
- Functional status: Active
- Heritage designation: Important Cultural Property
- Designated: June 29, 2023
- Architectural type: Church building
- Style: Baroque

Administration
- Archdiocese: Manila
- Deanery: Saints Peter and Paul
- Parish: Saints Peter and Paul

Clergy
- Priest: Kristoffer Habal

Saints Peter and Paul Parish Church, also known as San Pedro Macati Church, Sampiro Church, Makati Church, is a Roman Catholic church located in Makati Poblacion, the cultural and heritage barangay of Makati, Philippines. It is under the jurisdiction of the Archdiocese of Manila. It is considered as the mother church of Makati. In front of the church façade is Plaza Cristo Rey, which was formerly the San Pedro de Macati Cemetery. The National Museum of the Philippines designated the church an Important Cultural Property in 2023.

== History ==
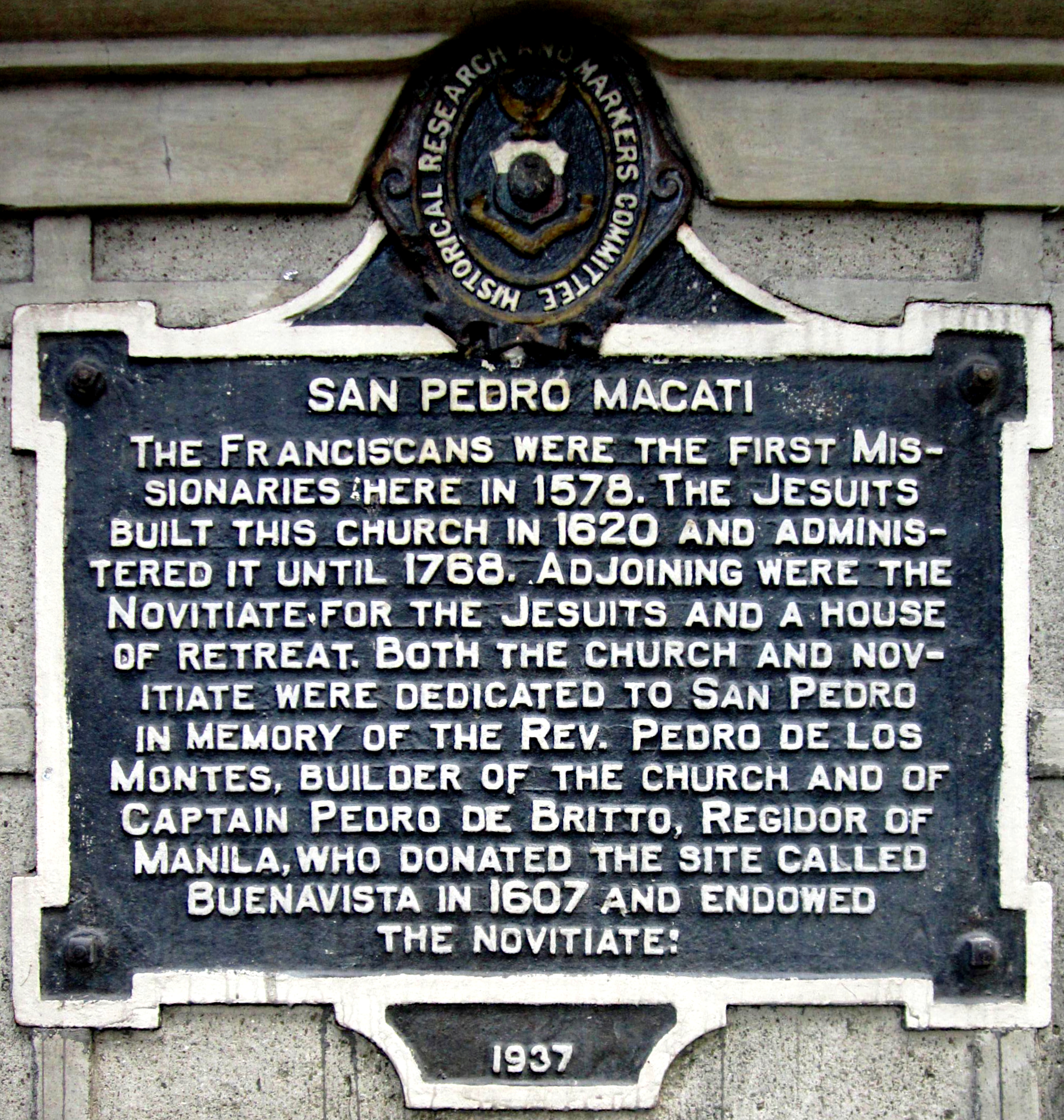
HRMC historical marker installed in 1937

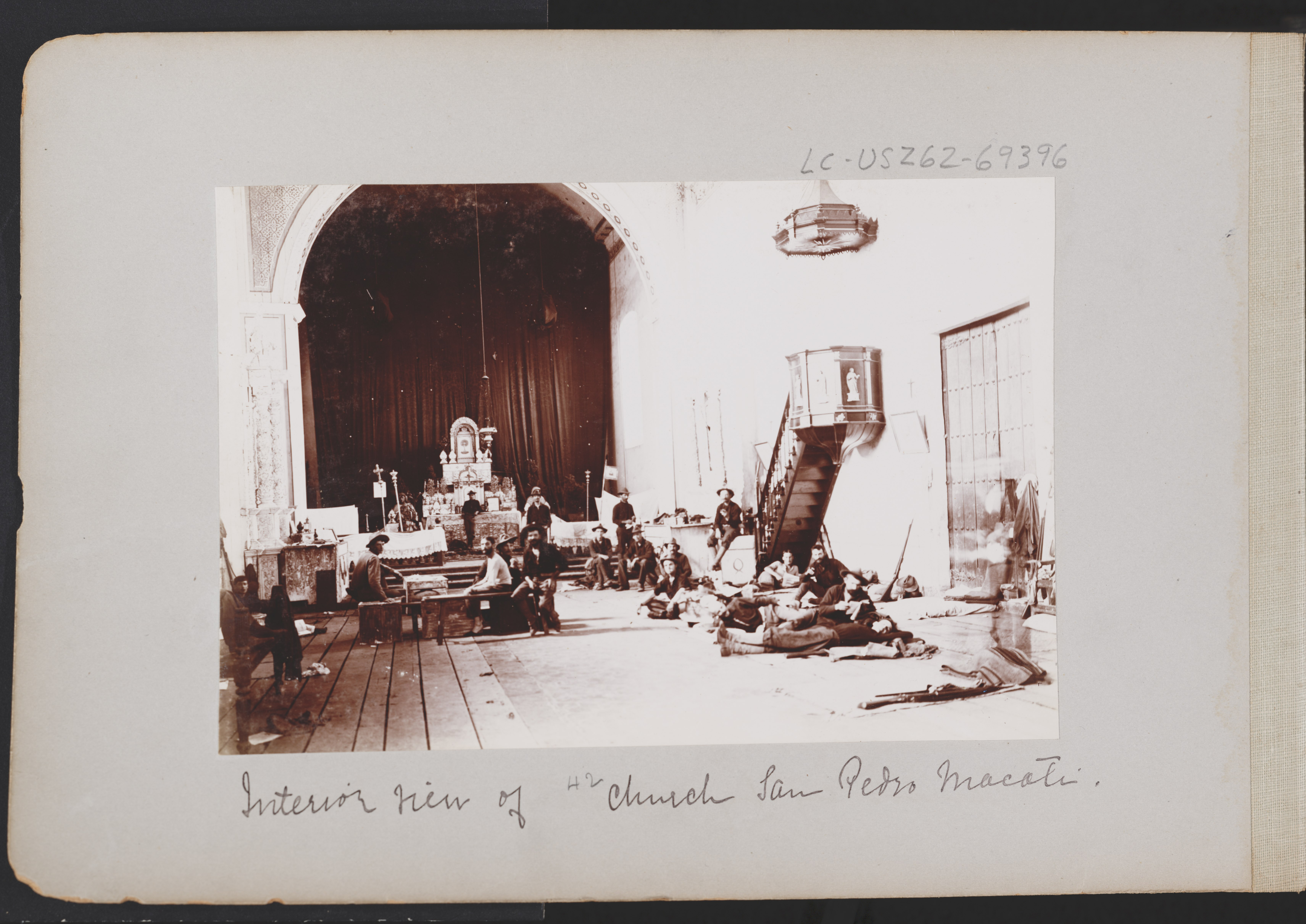
Church interior, taken in 1899 or 1900

Before the land seizure of the Spanish, the area of today's San Pedro de Macati was part of the Kingdom of Sapa or Namayan, ruled by the Rajah Kalamayin whose residence was in Namayan, now part of Santa Ana, Manila. The Franciscan missionaries were the first to convert the indigenous Tagalog of Sapa to Christianity by 1578, after they had turned the original barangay into a visita called Santa Ana de Sapa in 1570.

In 1589, Capitan Pedro de Brito, then an aide to the Spanish army chief of staff, purchased today's church premises as part of a large property with a public bid of 1,400 pesos, and installed his encomienda called "Hacienda Pedro". On July 1, 1608, de Brito, now the newly elected alferez general, and his wife Ana de Herrera donated part of their land to the Jesuits. Gregorio Lopez accepted the deed of donation and an endowment of 14,000 pesos for a house of probation. This house and the church were to be built in the highest hill in the area called Buenavista and were to be placed under the patronage of Saint Peter, the donor's name patron.

Construction of the first church was finished in 1620 under the direction of Pedro de los Montes. As the Jesuit encomienda began to earn at least 30,000 pesos annually from the production of earthenware, their vision of building an imposing structure could begin to be realized. The church known as San Pedro y Pablo Viejo was made from hewn stone, pebbles, and gravel mixed with mortar. Its facade is dominated with a three tiered papal tiara with the cross keys of Saint Peter. In 1718, an ivory image of the Blessed Virgin Mary depicted as Virgen de la Rosa (Virgin of the Rose) was brought from Mexico to the Philippines through the Manila–Acapulco Galleon trade by Jesuit Juan Delgado. This image of the Virgin Mary was enshrined in this church and was frequently venerated due to a relic of the Virgin's hair supposedly encapsuled in the image's breast.

According to a narrative by Nick Joaquin, this concept was backed by Pedro Murillo's description in his Historia de la Provincia de Filipinas de la Compania de Jesus (1749):

"Your most holy image of the Nuestra Señora de la Rosa has on her breast a most precious treasure, greater than those which Tharsis had in is opulence, or Ophir with his most valuable metals can offer. This is the strand of hair of her most holy head, whose authenticity I read with great admiration. In the vast extent of the Indies that I know of, there exists no similar reliquary."

Unfortunately, the reliquary got lost together with the ivory hands and head of the statue in the Revolution of 1899. There remains an oval cavity in the upper body, the missing pards have been restored using wood as a material instead of ivory.

In Lourdes Policarpio's view, the Virgin's title stems from "Our Lady as the Mystical Rose" or "Rosa Mystica". In Lucca, Italy, the feast of "Our Lady of the Rose" is celebrated on January 30. It is believed that three roses were found in the arms of Our Lady on January. when a deaf mute shepherd see the appearance of the Lady. He has able to speak after the apparition of Our Lady of Roses.

In the church parish, there are two famous festivals or fiestas held on June 29, the feast of Apostles Peter and Paul, and June 30, the feast of Nuestra Señora dela Rosa. The "Panatang Sayaw", as the Bailes de los Arcos (Dance of the Arches) are called, are an old tradition going back at least to the beginnings of the 19th century. It is a ritual of praise and thanksgiving to the saints Peter and Paul and the Virgen de la Rosa.

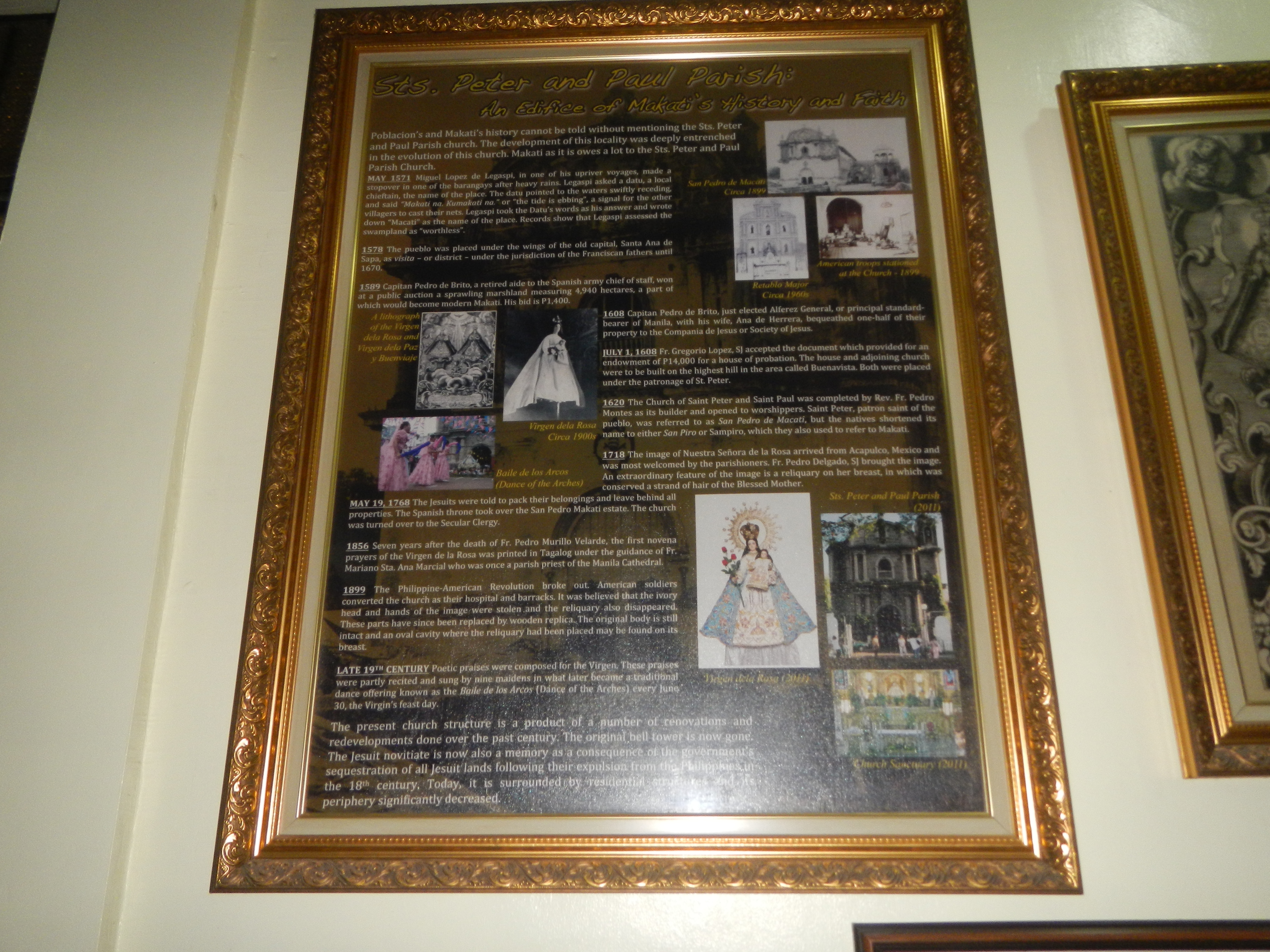
Church history

The church was destroyed during the British occupation of Manila in 1762. It was reconstructed much later in 1849 using stones from nearby Guadalupe in Makati and Meycauayan in Bulacan province. Other materials used include yakal and molave as wood materials, and kapre shells for windows and baticulin, guijo timbers and conchas or seashells for its windows.

After the Jesuits' expulsion, the ownership changed. The Makati hacienda was reclaimed by the government and was sold in public auction in 1795 to Don Pedro de Garuga, Marquis of Villa Medina. Through the next half-century, the property changed hands three times, until, in 1851, it was bought by Don Jose Bonifacio Roxas, the founding father of the Roxas–Ayala–Zobel clan, who built a family manor on the riverbank, what is today's Poblacion's river park, "Casa Hacienda Park".

During the Philippine–American War from 1899 to 1902, the church was used as a hospital to tend wounded American soldiers. American volunteers also camped on church grounds. This stay, however, resulted in the loss of the ivory head and hands of the Virgen de la Rosa.

Over the years, the Makati Church underwent several renovations and changes in the design but most of its features like the reredos and the church bells are still original.

Following the conclusion of the Second Vatican Council in 1965, Saint Paul was added as the second titular of the church, hence renaming the parish as the "Saints Peter and Paul Parish Church".

The church was re-dedicated on January 30, 2015, by Cardinal Luis Antonio Tagle, Archbishop of Manila.

On June 9, 2023, the Solemnity of Saints Peter and Paul, the church was declared an Important Cultural Property by the National Museum of the Philippines.

== Architecture ==
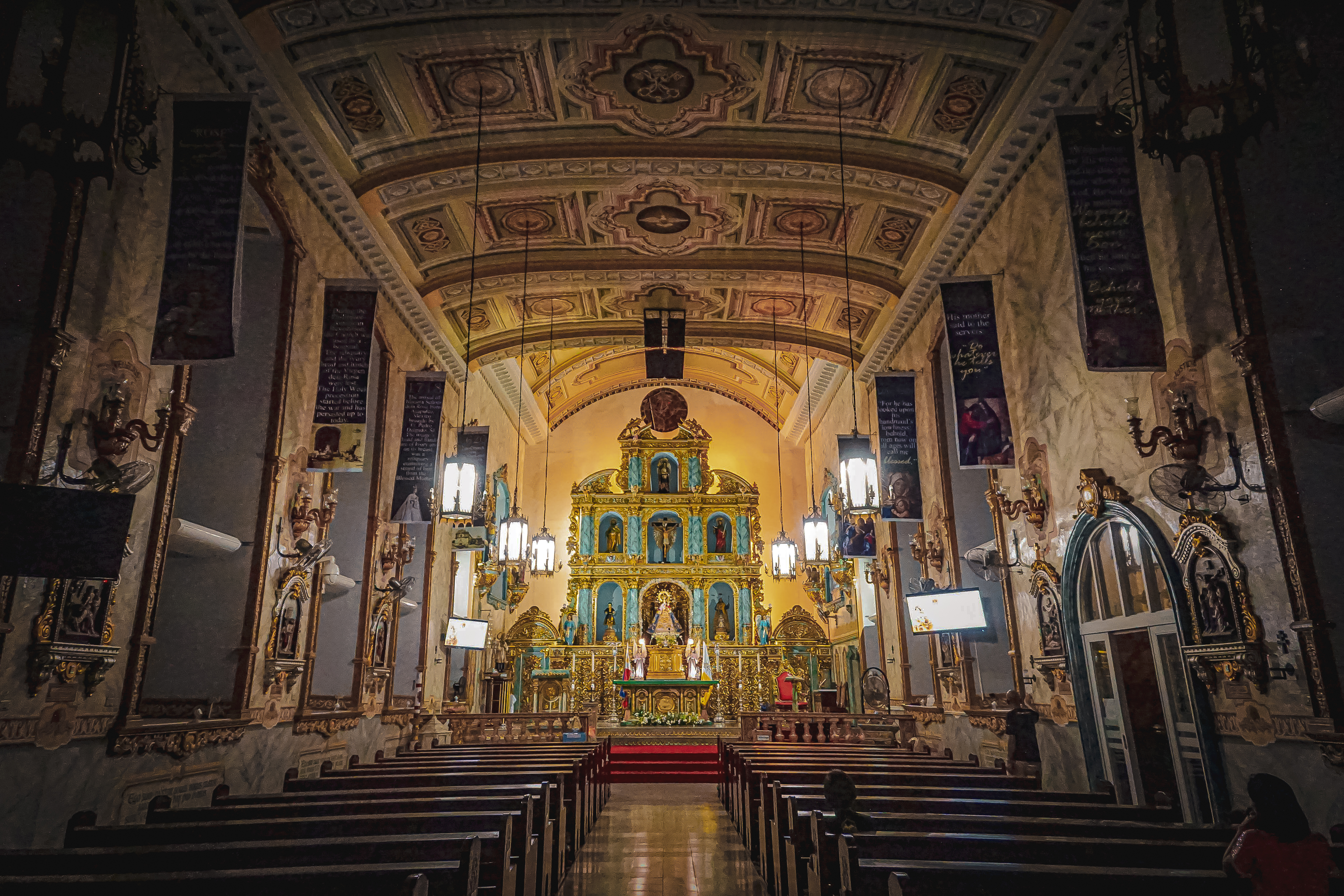
The church houses an altar with its carved reredos.

The church structure follows the Baroque style of architecture. Its architectural feature of a single rectangular nave consisting of an apse and sacristy is typical of churches during the Spanish colonial period. The altar with its original carved reredos with motifs of various flowers and fruits following the Baroque Rococo tradition can still be found in the church.

== La Virgen de la Rosa ==
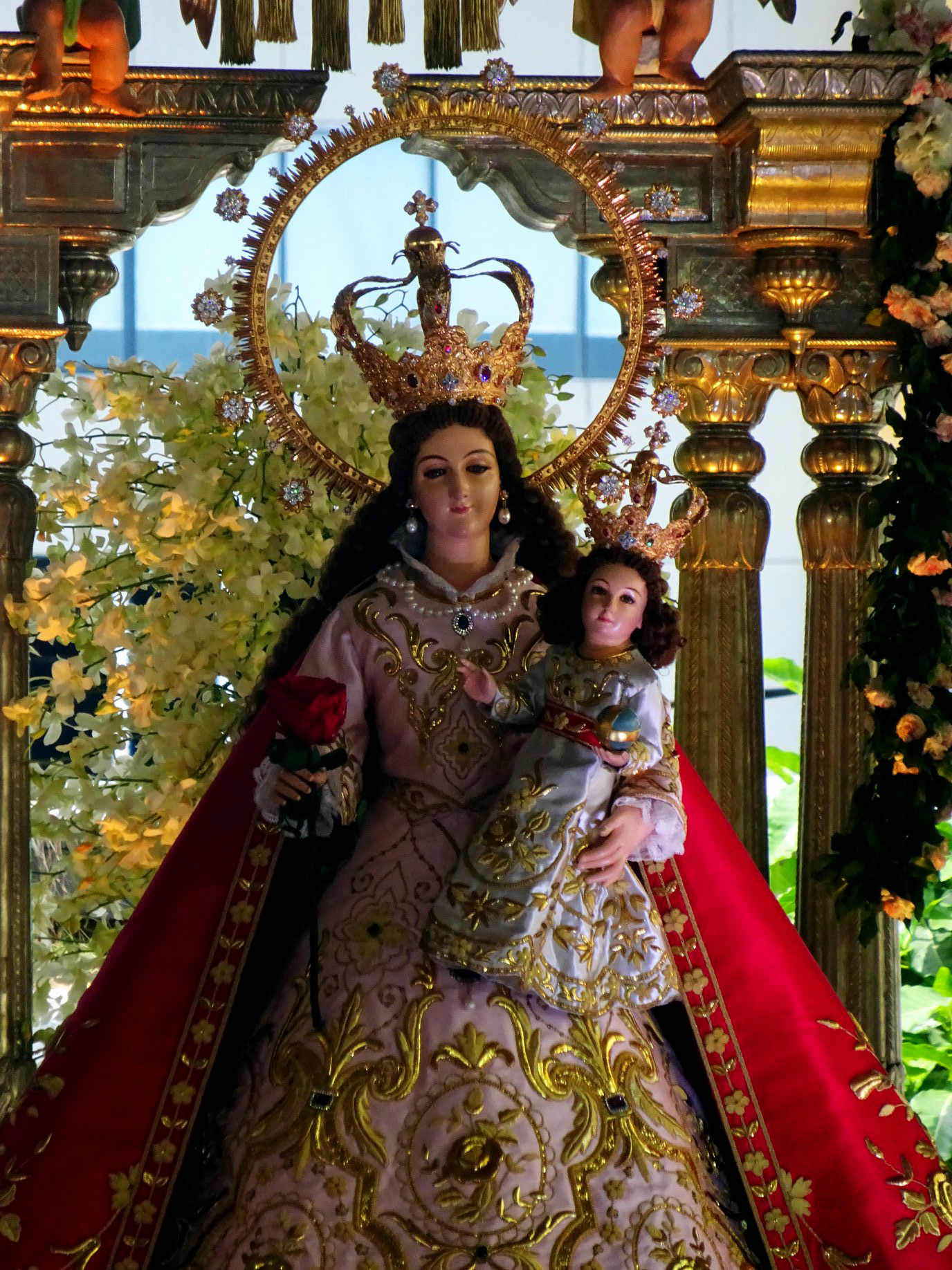
The statue of the La Virgen de la Rosa de Macati during her Canonical coronation on March 16, 2019

The statue of the La Virgen de la Rosa was brought to the Philippines from Mexico by Fr. Juan Delgado on August 10, 1718, via the Manila–Acapulco Galleon trade through the galleon Sacra Familia. One of the unique features of the statue was that it once had a reliquary in the chest of the statue which encases a very special relic – the actual piece of the hair of the Virgin Mary. Unfortunately, during the Philippine Revolution, the hair and the ivory hands and head of the Virgin were stolen and the whereabouts are still unknown until present. After the arrival of the icon, the devotion to the La Virgen de la Rosa de Macati became well known throughout San Pedro Macati. Due to the miracles attributed through the intercession of the La Virgen de la Rosa de Macati, Pope Francis granted a pontifical decree of pontifical coronation towards the statue on October 29, 2018. The canonical coronation rites were held on March 16, 2019.

On March 15, 2024, La Virgen de la Rosa was declared as a Cultural Heritage Treasure and Patroness of the City of Makati.

== Ecclesiastical jurisdiction ==
The ecclesiastical jurisdiction of the parish church encompasses barangays Poblacion, Valenzuela (except for Santiago and Rizal Villages, which are under Saint Andrew the Apostle Parish), and Olympia in Makati.

The following chapels fall within under its jurisdiction:

- San Padre Pio Da Pietrelcina Chapel (Century City Mall)
- Our Lady of Lourdes Chapel (Olympia)
- San Fabian Chapel (Olympia Village)
- Holy Cross Chapel (Olympia)
- Inmaculada Concepcion Chapel (Infanta Subdivision, Olympia)

The church also had jurisdiction over the former Makati Catholic Cemetery, which is now the Makati Columbarium Park, in Barangay Valenzuela.

=== Vicariate of Saints Peter and Paul ===
The parish church is under the jurisdiction of the Archdiocese of Manila under the vicariate forane of Saints Peter and Paul. Aside from this parish church of the same name, the vicariate covers the following parish churches and mission stations in central Makati:

- Holy Cross Parish
- National Shrine of the Sacred Heart
- Nuestra Señora de Gracia Parish
- Our Lady of La Paz Parish
- Saint Andrew the Apostle Parish
- Saint John Bosco Parish
- Sto. Niño de Paz Mission Station (Greenbelt Chapel)
- Mary Mother of Hope Mission Station and Our Lady of the Most Holy Rosary Chapel (Landmark and SM Makati Chapels)

== Pastoral team ==
=== Parish priests ===
Name	Years of pastorship	Present assignment
Jose Dimbla	1899 to 1904	Deceased
Tirso Tomacruz	1918	Deceased
Adriano Cuerpo	1920 to 1929	Deceased
Getulio Ingal	1930	Deceased
Osmundo Aguilar	1931 to 1939	Deceased
Lazaro Ochuga	1939 to 1951	Deceased
Francisco Teodoro	1955 to 1974	Deceased
Pablo Dimagiba	1974	
Feliciano Santos	1974 to 1980	Deceased
Antonio B. Unson	1980 to 2006	Deceased
Estelito Villegas	2006 to 2014	Rector and parish priest of Ermita Church, Manila
Pedro Gerardo O. Santos	2014 to 2022	Parish priest of St. Andrew the Apostle Parish, Makati
Genaro O. Diwa	2022 to 2024	Chaplain of Sacred Heart of Jesus Chaplaincy, Power Plant Mall, Makati
Kristoffer H. Habal	2024 to Present	

=== Former priests ===
Name	Years of pastorship	Previous assignment
Virgilio Soriano	1937	
Pio Palad	1951	
Dalmacio Eusebio	1960	Parochial vicar
Amado Ligon Jr.	1967	Parochial vicar
Augusto Pedrosa	1968	Parochial vicar
Celso Sta. Maria	1970	Parochial vicar
Rogelio Positar	1996	Attached priest
Jaime Bautista	1996	Parochial vicar
Wilmer Rosario	2006	Parochial vicar
Estanislao Amper		Parochial vicar
Roy Bellen	2006–2011	
John Patrick D. Calimlim	2008–2015	Parochial vicar
Ryan Diño	2016	Attached priest
Reyann Orlandes	2017–2018	Attached priest
Boy Aurelio Buhay		Resident priest
Alwin Bobis		Resident priest
William Parde Jr.		Resident priest

=== Present priests ===
As of April 2026:

Name	Assignment
Ramon Merino	Parochial Vicar
John Fredrick Ducut	Parochial Vicar
Vermundo Miranda	Guest Priest

== Gallery ==
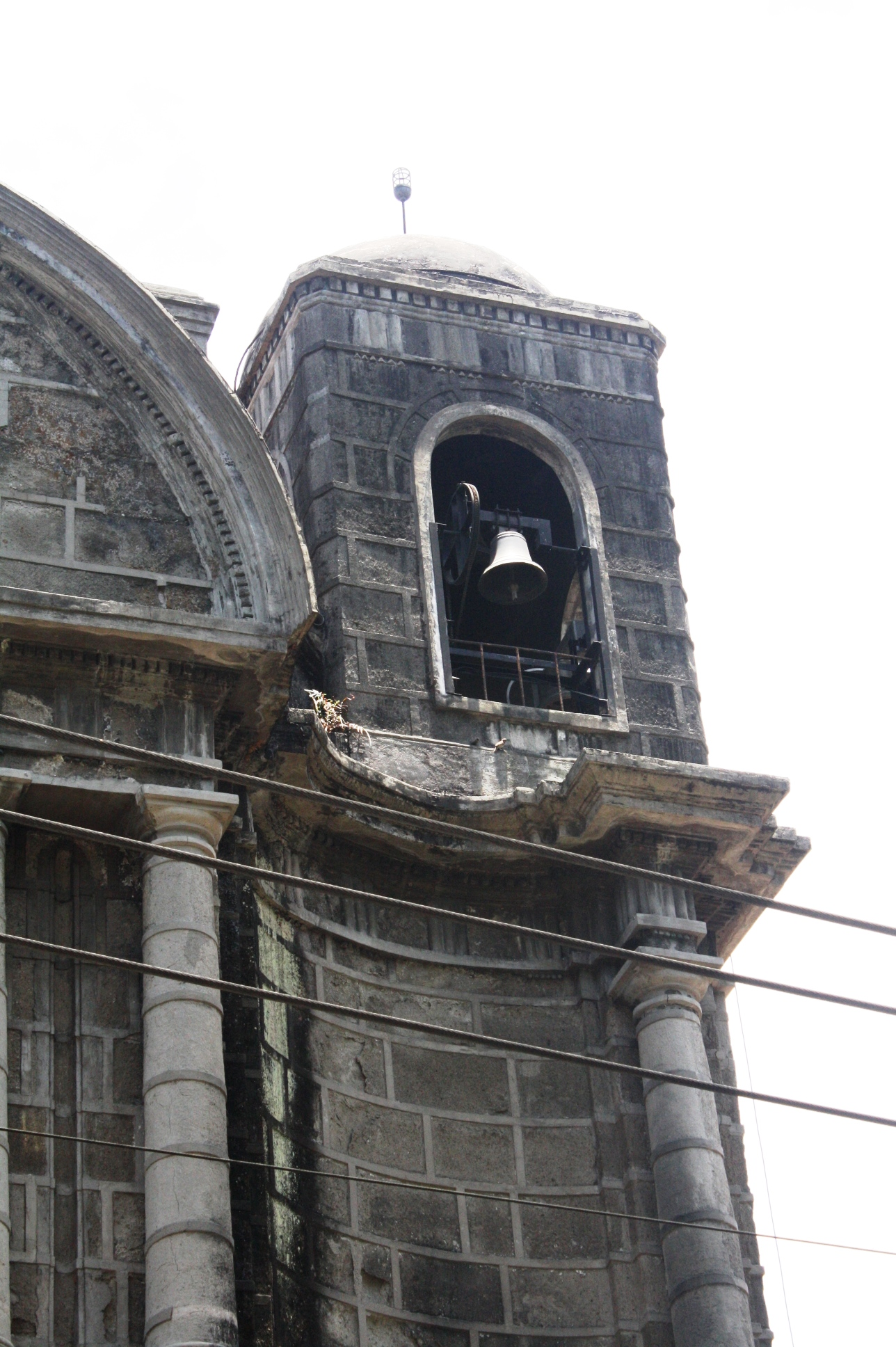
Church belfry

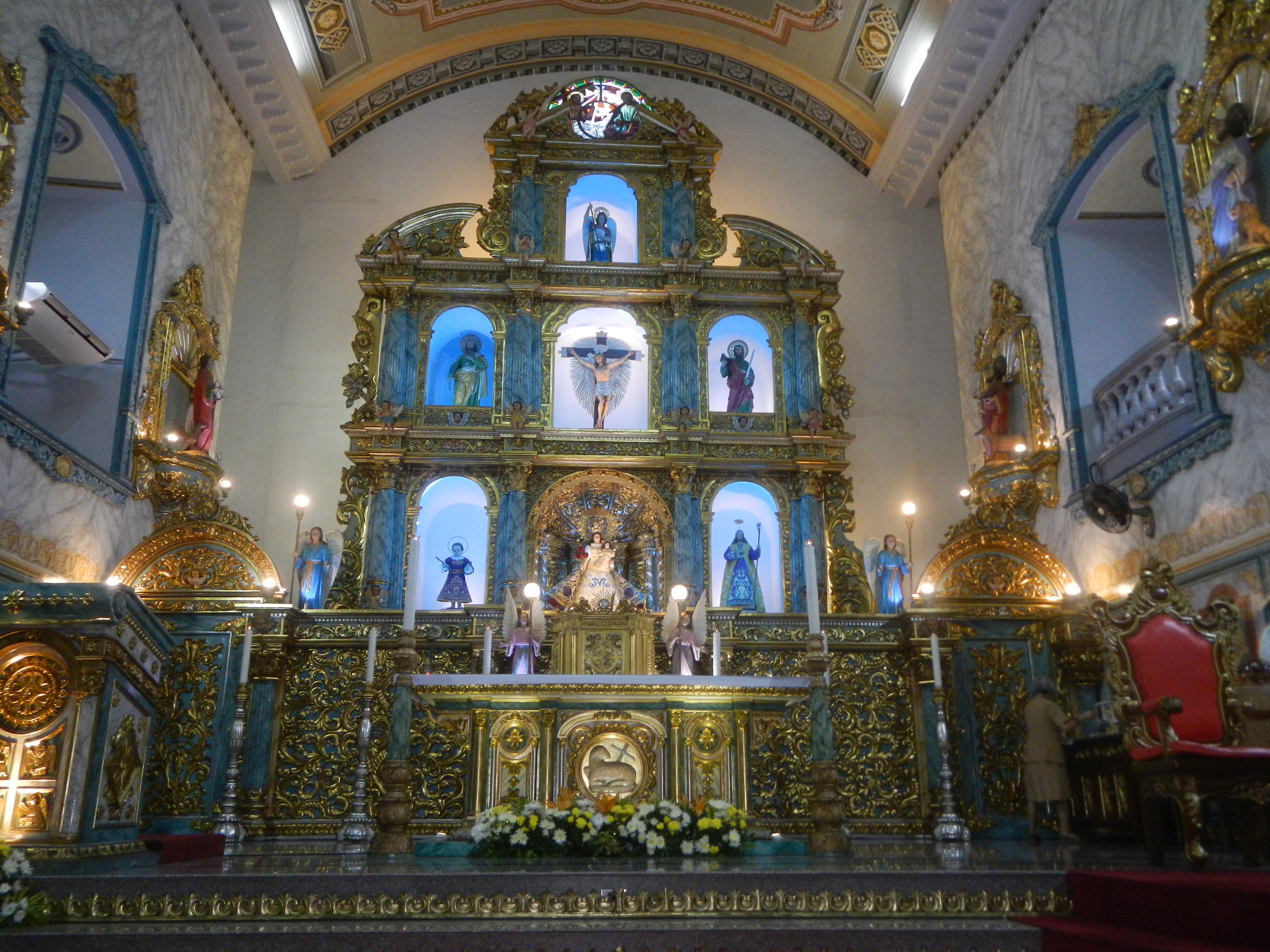
Church sanctuary

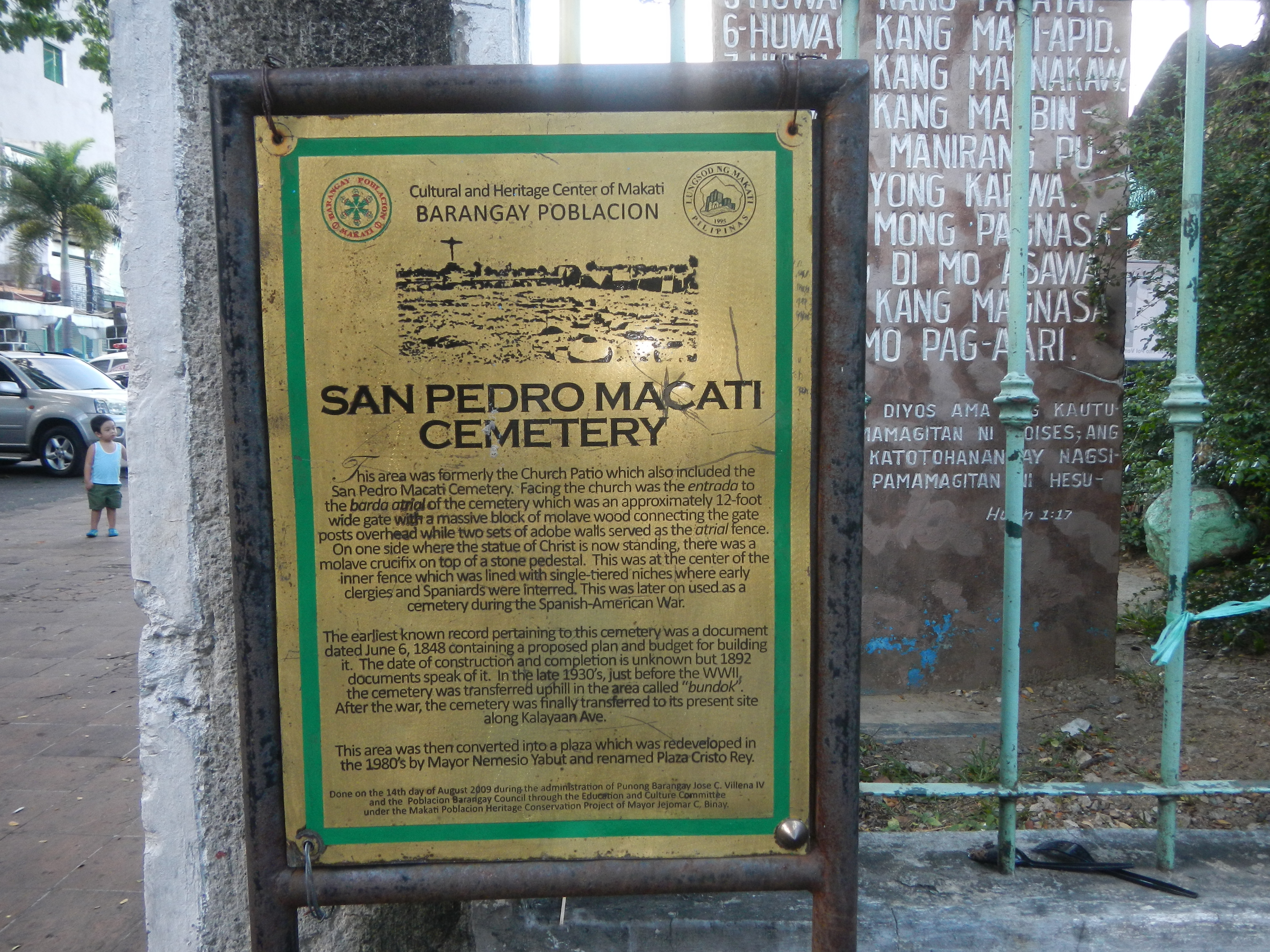
San Pedro Macati Cemetery historical marker

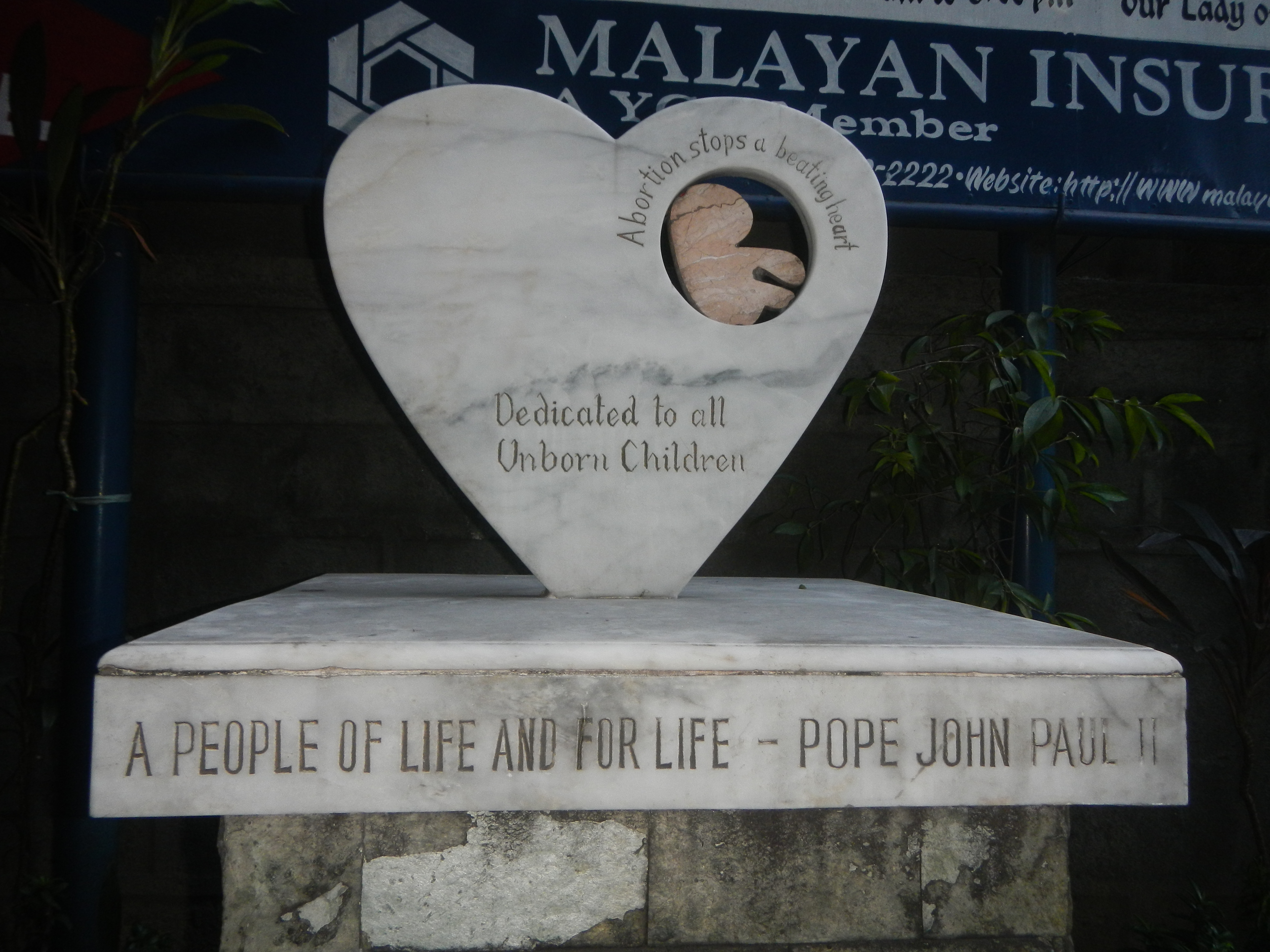
Memorial dedicated to all unborn children

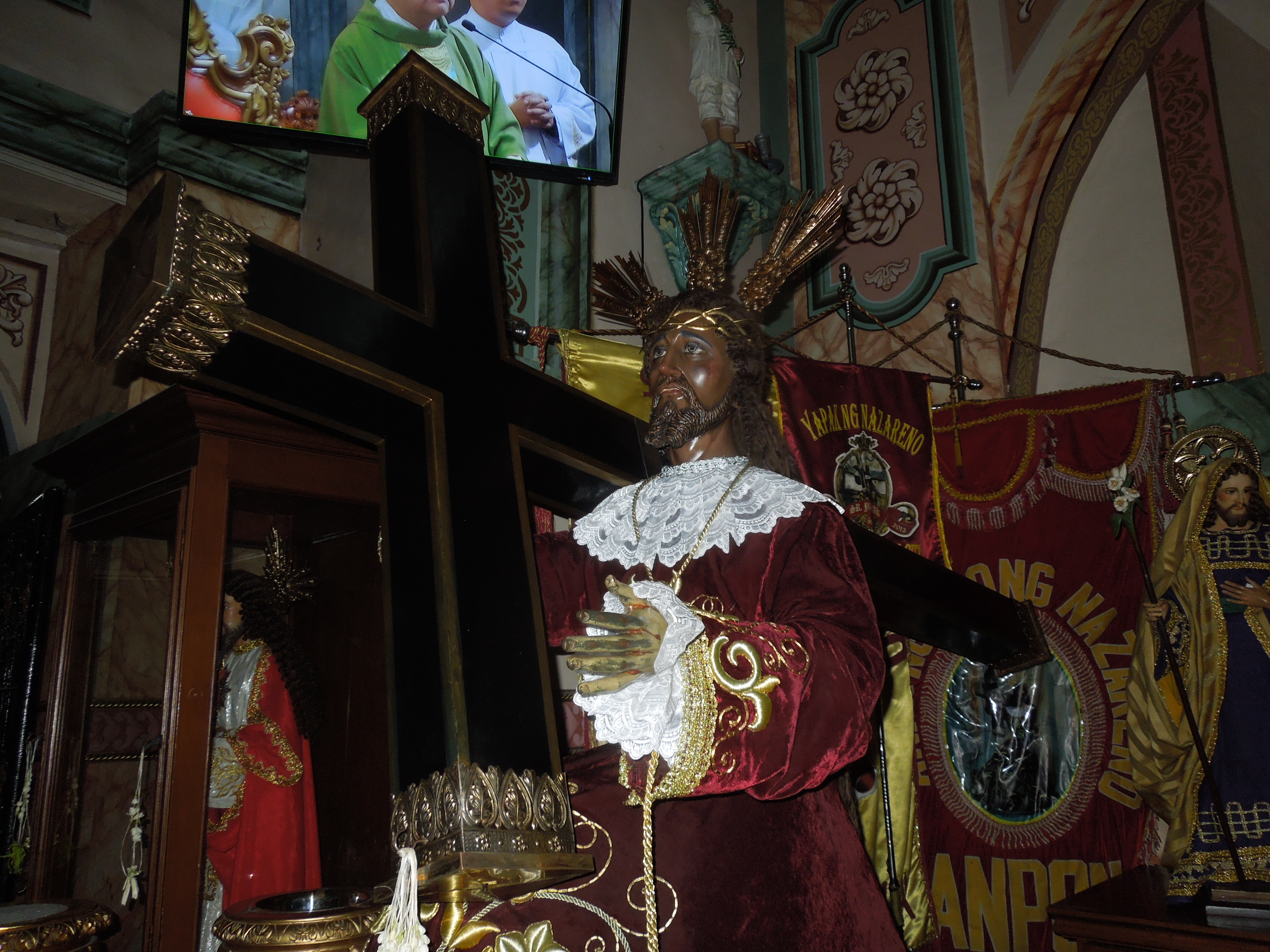
Black Nazarene statue

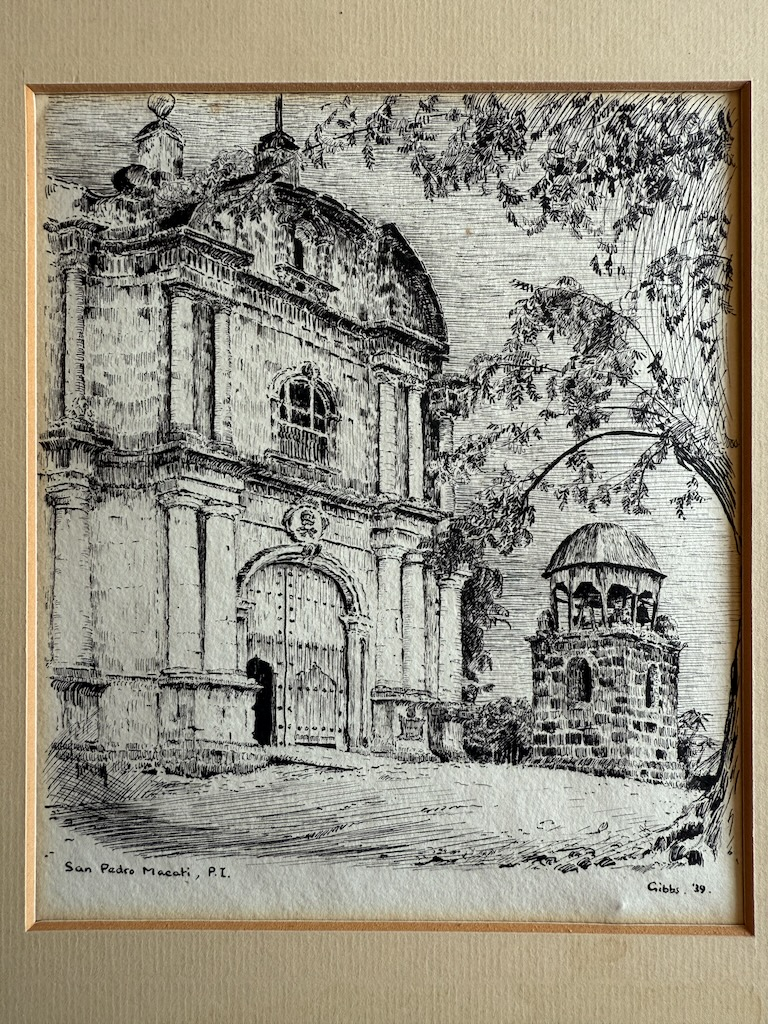
Pen and ink study of San Pedro Macati PI by Prof R Darnley Gibbs in 1939
