= Nuestra Señora de Gracia Church =

Roman Catholic church in Makati, Philippines

Guadalupe Church
- Nuestra Señora de Gracia Parish Church
- Iglesia Nuestra Señora de Gracia (Spanish); Iglesia de Guadalupe (Spanish); Parroquia de Guadalupe (Spanish)
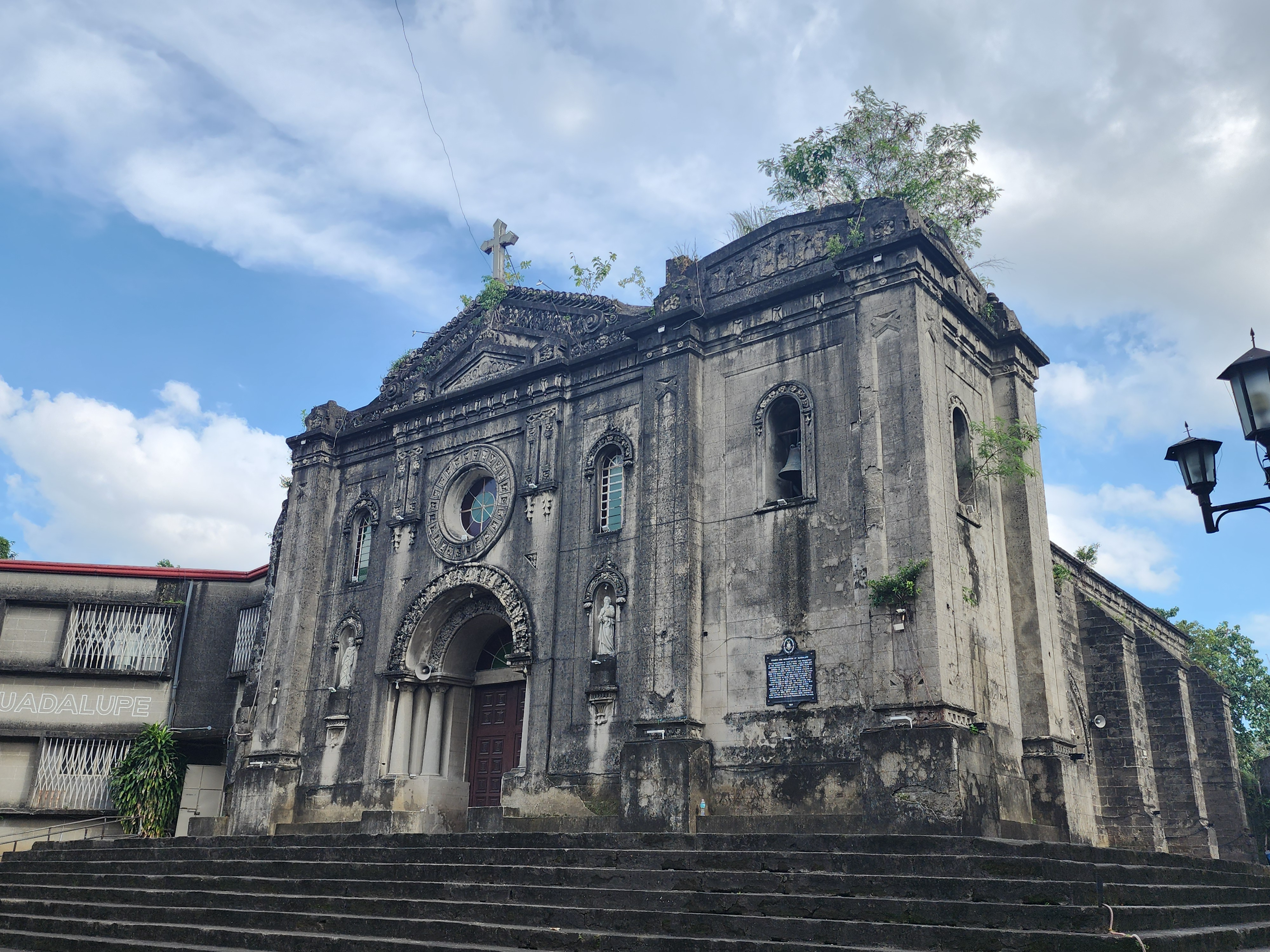
- Church façade in November 2024

- Location in Metro Manila Location in Luzon Location in the Philippines
- 14°33′59″N 121°02′36″E
- Location: 7440 Bernardino Street, Guadalupe Viejo, Makati, Metro Manila
- Country: Philippines
- Denomination: Roman Catholic
- Website: nsdg.ph

History
- Status: Parish church
- Dedication: Our Lady of Grace
- Other dedication: Virgin of Candelaria

Architecture
- Functional status: Active
- Architectural type: Church building
- Style: Baroque
- Groundbreaking: 1601
- Completed: 1630

Administration
- Archdiocese: Manila
- Deanery: Saints Peter and Paul
- Parish: Nuestra Señora de Gracia

Clergy
- Priest(s): Rev. Fr. Joselito R. Martin; Rev. Fr. Jose Francisco Syquia; Rev. Fr. Richard Enrique Garrido

The Nuestra Señora de Gracia Church, commonly known as Guadalupe Church (abbreviated as NSDG), is a Baroque Roman Catholic church in Makati City, Philippines. The parish church and its adjacent monastery are currently administered by the Archdiocese of Manila. The territory of the parish covers San Carlos Seminary, the major seminary of the Archdiocese of Manila and Our Lady of Guadalupe Minor Seminary. The church also has an adjacent seminary, the Monasterio de Guadalupe, which admits young professionals for priestly and religious vocation. The current parish priest is Rev. Fr. Joselito R. Martin.

== History ==
=== Foundation ===
Church HRMC historical marker installed in 1937

The first sanctuary and monastery in Guadalupe was built by Simón Dantes. This foundation was declared a domus formata or a community under the advocacy of Our Lady of Grace through a Provincial Chapter on March 7, 1601. One year after, the community in Guadalupe was given the right to vote in the provincial chapters.

In the Chapter held on November 30, 1603, the patroness, Our Lady of Grace was changed to Our Lady of Guadalupe following the request of several devout and religious people to honor the memory of the Virgin Mary venerated in Extremadura, Spain. A wooden replica of the statue was later brought from Spain.

By 1632, the devotion had spread due to the Manila-Acapulco galleon trade. Devotees from Spain and Mexico thronged into the sanctuary of Guadalupe to pay their respects to the Virgin. It became such a habitual courtesy that the authorities were forced to put up a landing dock at the foot of the hill by the river. A wooden house and a stairs of stone of around one hundred steps were built in order to accommodate the pilgrims who in turn never failed to donate money.

Due to its altitude, the monastery offered good sanitary conditions. It was designed as the "sole recreation house for the religious living in Manila." A clause of the Chapter held in 1716 prohibited the religious from going to any other house for their vacations except to Guadalupe. It was resting place not only for the religious but also for persons of the highest authority in the islands. Its high location differs with the low land of Manila.

In 1853, the Monastery became a domus studiorum or House of Studies for Grammar to accommodate the excess students of the Monastery of Manila. In 1882, the monastery was converted for three years into an asilo to house the orphans of the victims of the 1882 cholera epidemic in Manila, and in 1885 it served as Escuela de Artes y Oficios, among whose professors were the San Pedro brothers, Melchor and Gaspar. Among other facilities, it had a printing press, which was later transferred to the asilo of Malabon. This printing press was later destroyed together with the Escuela de Artes of Malabon during the Philippine Revolution.

=== Construction ===
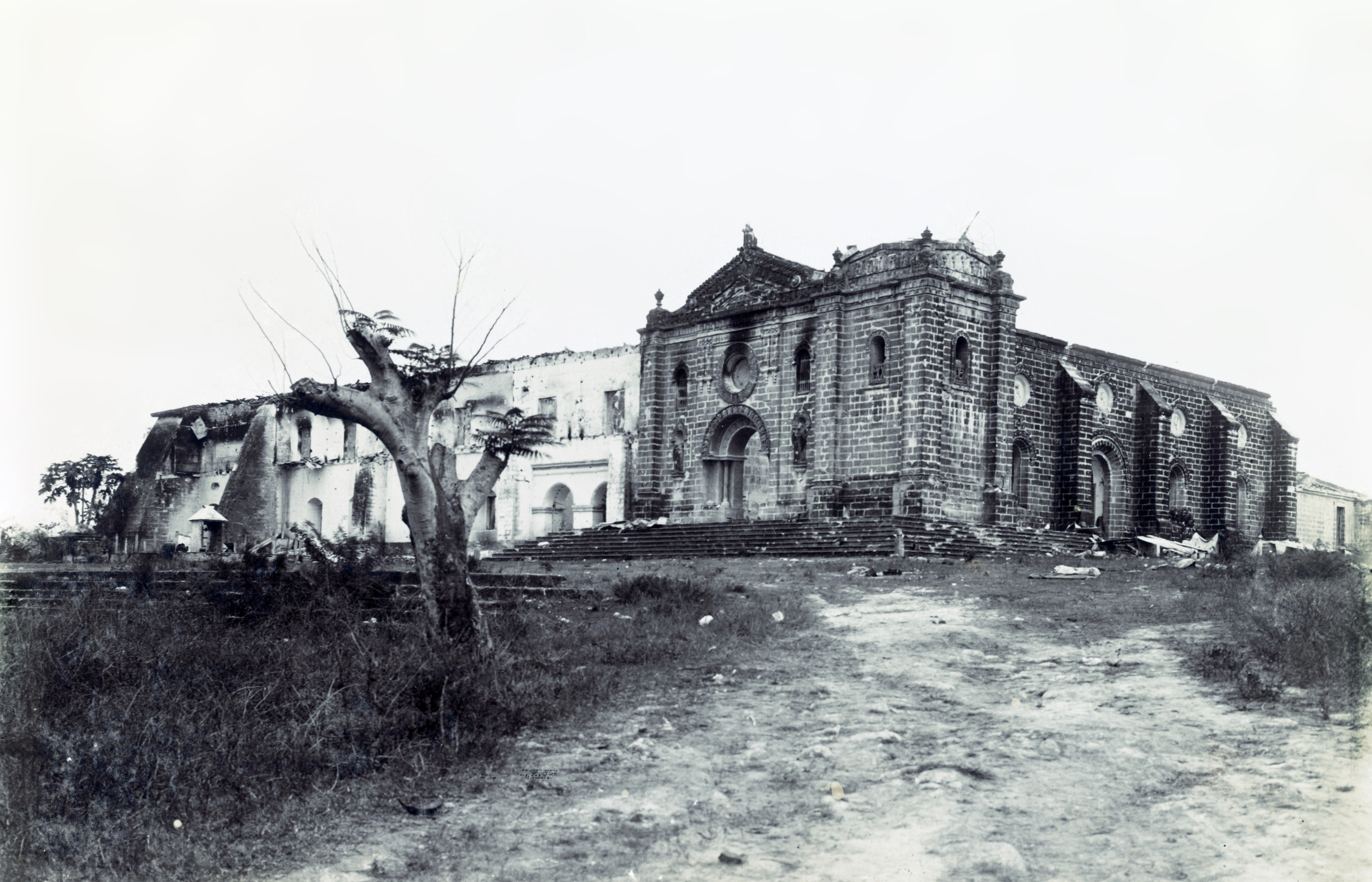
The church and convent in ruins after the Philippine–American War in 1899

Makeshift buildings were constructed from March 7, 1601, to 1605, as the monastery was declared a community house (dormus formata). Juan de Montes de Oca, who was elected as Prior Administrator of Guadalupe, started the construction of a stone sanctuary. Juan Montes de Oca, and family had arrived to the Philippines, according to Rafael Bernal from their homelands at Mexico, Juan de Montes de Oca is a relative of the leader of the Filipino-Mexican Revolution against Spain Isidoro Montes de Oca, the battle standard of which was also Our Lady of Guadalupe of Mexico, the same titular patron as the current church in Makati. However, work was derailed due to his transfer to another assignment. Succeeding prior administrators did little on the project as they were easily transferred too to other mission outposts. In 1623, Hernando Guerrero continued the work of his predecessors and was notable in constructing many portions of the monastery and the belfry. The sanctuary and monastery, however, were finished by Estacio Ortíz in 1630.

The breaking of the rocky ground for the church foundations cost the Augustinians time and money. The stone was quarried from the Guadalupe mountains, and lime was mixed in the many ovens and factories in operation nearby to make tiles, bricks, and large earthenware.

=== Later history ===
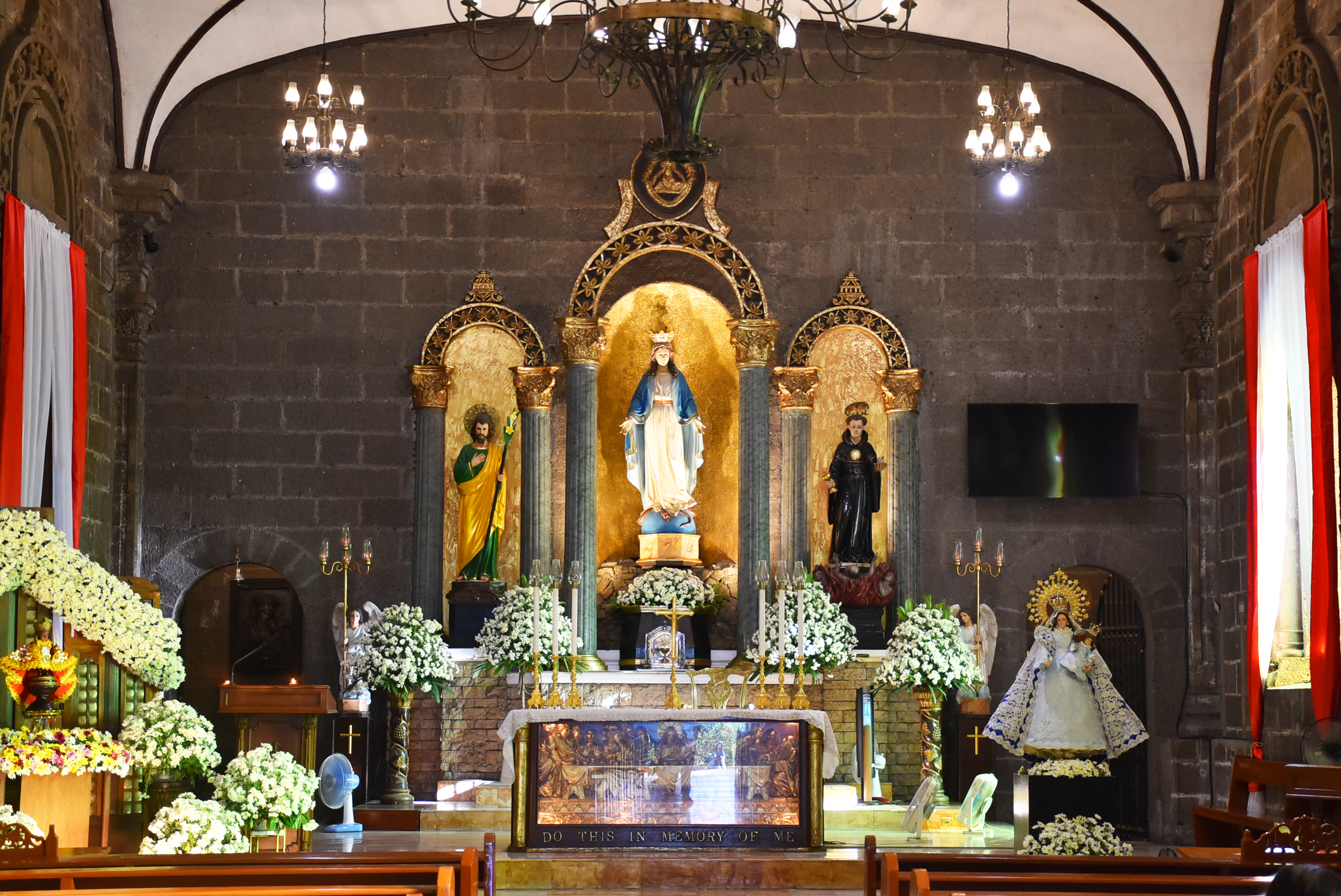
Image of the church's titular, enshrined in the main altar

For the first 30 years, the monastery depended on the alms contributed, as decreed by the chapters, from the houses of Bacolor, Parañaque, Malate, Taguig, Pasig, Bay (Laguna), Guagua and Lubao. From this time, since the church was finished and since the naos started coming in 1632, "the house will be self-sufficient to support a few religious". This meant that all the buildings had been completed and the collections had now to be given to the San Agustin Monastery in Manila, the motherhouse of the province.

The church was damaged during the earthquake of 1658. Alonso Quijano repaired the damage from 1659 to 1662. He also started on embellishing the shrine but this cannot be continued due to shortage of funds. New repairs were discussed during the Chapter held on June 10, 1691, which authorized the Provincial, Francisco Zamora to donate more funds to Buenaventura Bejar to fortify the church and build the buttresses to support the vault. In 1706, Father Provincial Juan Olarte informed the fathers that the church needed urgent repair of the floor, the tiles, wooden platforms to restore the soleras of the living room, to replace partition walls with bricks, to make new corridors with windows, and to repair the belfry. The father provincial suggested to the definitory that "due to the shortness of funds and the low income of Guadalupe, the Province must help, especially now that the monastery has become a stopping place for governors and bishops coming to these Islands."

He assigned 1,000 pesos from this own pocket on condition that he be reimbursed 100 pesos annually until his death. With all the help, the monastery became one of the best edifice outside Manila to be found in the Philippines.

The 1754 eruption of Taal Volcano severely damaged Batangas province but spared the Guadalupe complex. In 1762, the occupying British soldiers converted it into their military headquarters. They desecrated the church and sacked the tombs; images of saints were defiled and robbed of their decorations and jewelries. The image of Our Lady of Guadalupe was spared due to the timely intervention of an Irish official who brought it to Pasig for safekeeping until 1764.

The 1880 earthquake caused considerable damage to the church. The masonry vault collapsed, which slackened the church buttresses and reduced the shrine in shambles. This earthquake also destroyed the original image of Our Lady of Guadalupe. A replica was made after six years by Melchor and Gaspar San Pedro to replace the original, and this image was venerated until 1899 when it was lost in the Philippine–American War.

During the Chapter held on December 5, 1881, the father provincial authorized the prior, José Corugedo, to rebuild the church. He replaced the stone vault with a wooden ceiling and gave 7,000 pesos. In 1889, the father provincial condoned the 10,549 pesos that Guadalupe owed his funds. Celestino Fernández, prior of Guadalupe in 1889, was authorized to repair the church flooring, a mosaic-set-on-molave wood already rotten and the roof of the pantheon. The convent was also plastered and whitewashed.

The church and monastery were both occupied by the Filipino revolutionaries in 1898–1899, and later by the American forces. As a result, the edifices were gutted by fire. The ruins were, for a while became a haunted place to the barrio folk. During the Japanese occupation, the buildings were turned into garrison and headquarters. The structures suffered from the senselessness of both the Philippine–American War and World War II.

Reconstruction of the entire Philippines, particularly its infrastructures, started at the end of World War II in 1945. During those time, authorities of the Archdiocese of Manila then started to find resources to reconstruct old edifices, particularly the Manila Cathedral.

Since the Augustinians sold (or lend) one of its holdings in Metro Manila, particularly the Nuestra Señora de Guadalupe Shrine (formerly known), the Archdiocese of Manila took initiative to use the old stones of the old monastery to be taken to Intramuros for the rehabilitation of the Manila Cathedral.

Soon after the reconstruction period, the Augustinians were then recalled, 75 years after they left, to their own house on June 29, 1970, after an agreement was concluded between the Archbishop of Manila, Cardinal Rufino Santos, and the vicar of the Augustinians in the Philippines, Casimiro García. They inherited a concrete-made convent and the ruins of the church. With assistance from the province and donations from parishioners, the Augustinians have since rebuilt the sanctuary of Guadalupe. Fr. Arsenio Pioquinto revived the church amid the nightly stoning of Casa del Clero, with the aid of Makati Mayor Nemesio Yabut. The reconstruction and rehabilitation of the entire complex was completed in 1972. In 1974, Fr. William Araña, the new parish priest began the church restoration. In 1983, Fr. Rodolfo Arreza, as prior in 1983 transformed the old Casa del Clero, as the San "Agustin Seminary" for minor college seminarians. In 1984, the church and monastery were under the New Augustinian's Province of Santo Niño de Cebu. In 1988, Fr. Marcelino Malanabut was appointed parish priest until he was succeeded by Fr. Nicolas Echeveria.

After it was declared as a parish in the 1970s, the name of the church reverted its name under the title of Nuestra Señora de Gracia and became the titular patroness of the parish. It is also one of the Marian titular devotions of the Augustinian Order. However, this ended as the Augustinians transferred administration of the church and the Monasterio de Guadalupe to diocesan clergy on June 16, 2024. The transition period continued until the first diocesan parish priest, Rev. Fr. Joselito Robles Martin, and the first diocesan parochial vicar, Rev. Fr. Jose Francisco Syquia, were installed on August 1, 2024.

== Architecture ==
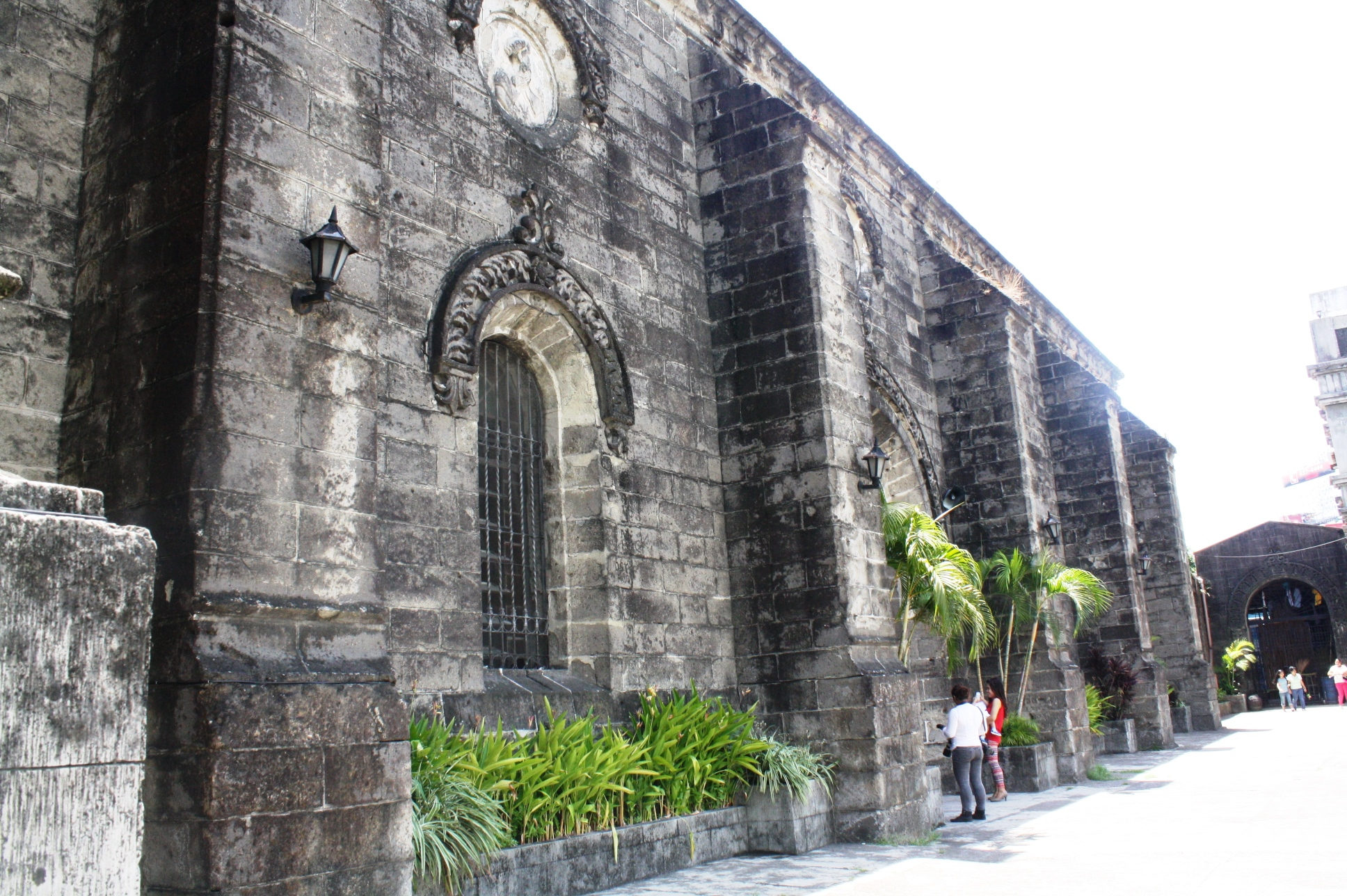
Buttresses in the church side walls

=== Exterior ===
The church is a mixture of different architecture styles. An example of this is the façade which shows Neo-Romanesque-Gothic style. The massive buttresses create a vertical movement, stopped only by the roundness of windows, statues, niches and the semicircular arch of the main entrance. The missing old monastery to which it was attached on the left sets the façade somehow off balance. Two sets of Doric columns support the cornice and the triangular pediment. Leaf carvings above the main recessed entrance, niches, windows and around the Tympanum lightens the massive character of the structure which have touches of the Baroque. A string course of arabesque designs runs along the architrave.

=== Interior ===
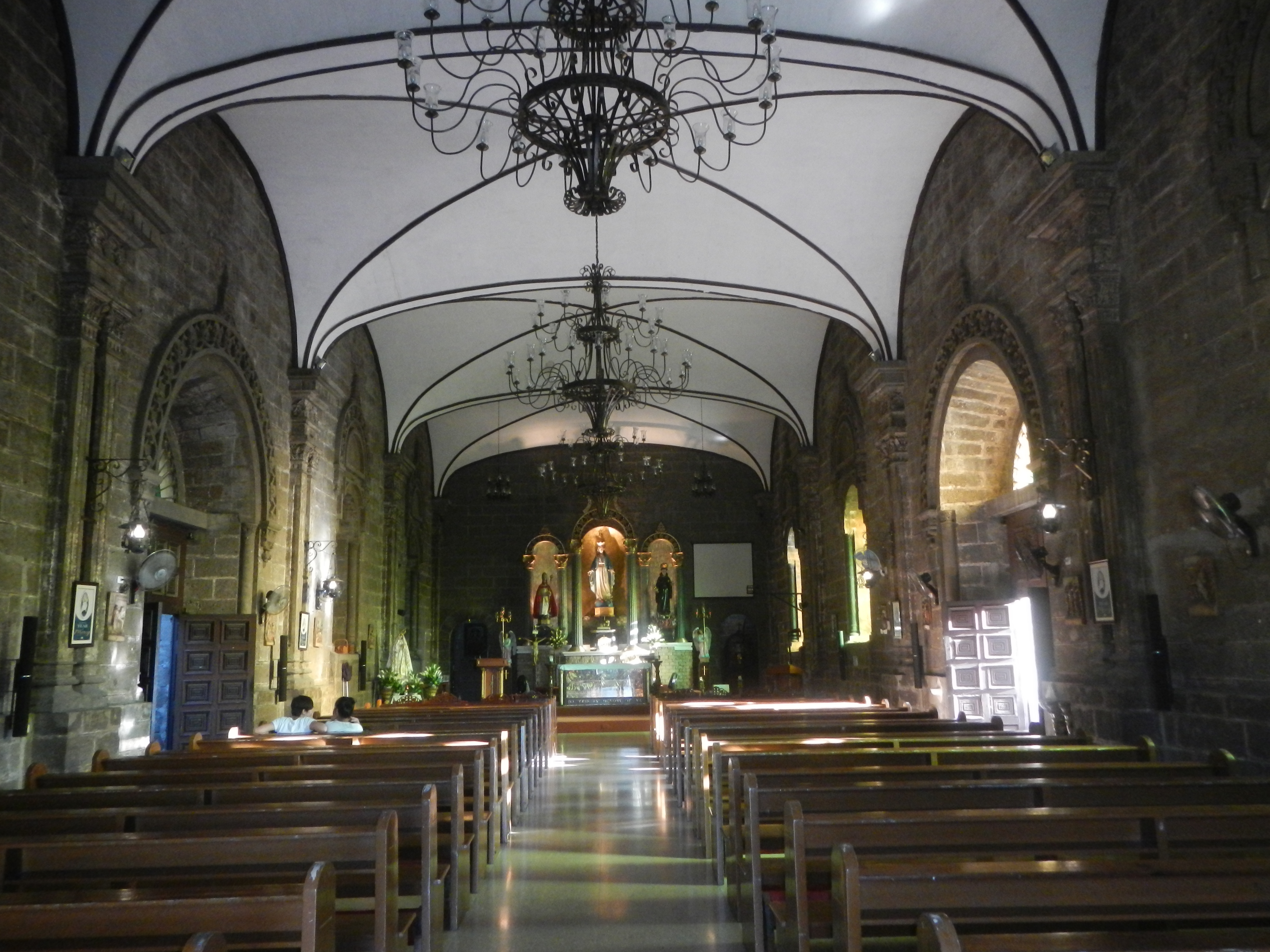
Church interior in 2016

The stone vault of the interior has been replaced lately by one of plywood plastered with stucco cement which ages the structure, original Ermita-type structure. The interiors and the window details have influences of the Baroque architecture.

The church is one of the most popular wedding venues in Metro Manila.

== Parish priests ==
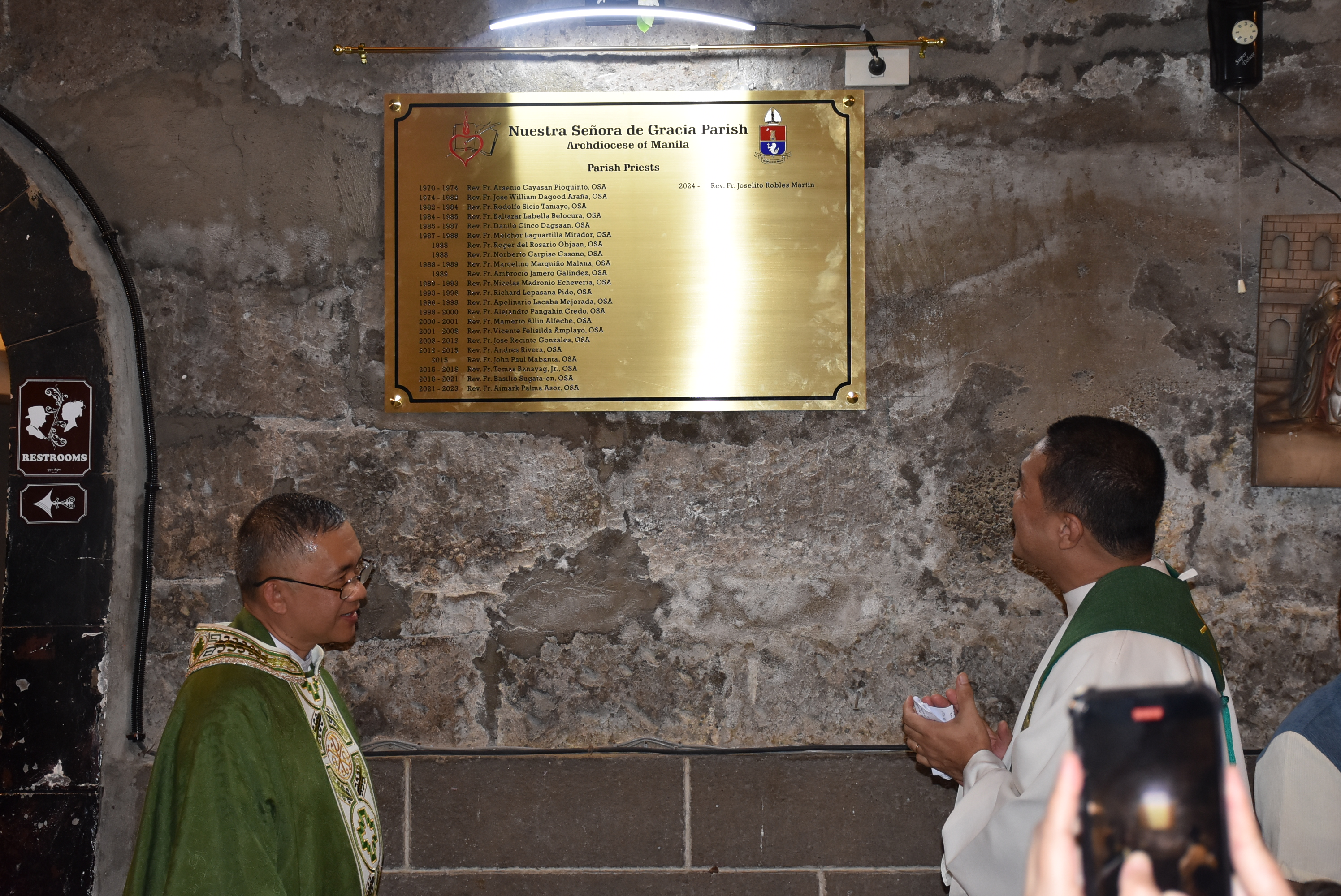
Rev. Fr. Andrew Bayatola OSA (left), the Prior Provincial of the Augustinian Province of Santo Niño de Cebu, presents the marker during the 2024 Transition/Turnover Mass, alongside Rev. Fr. Joselito Martin, the first incoming Diocesan Parish Priest.

In 2024, a marker was placed inside the church building to commemorate the Augustinian parish priests of Nuestra Señora de Gracia Parish as well as its first diocesan parish priest. This marker was officially introduced during the parish administration transition mass on June 16, 2024.

| Year | Parish Priest |
|---|---|
| 1970 - 1974 | Rev. Fr. Arsenio Cayasan Pioquinto, OSA |
| 1974 - 1982 | Rev. Fr. Jose William Dagood Araña, OSA |
| 1982 - 1984 | Rev. Fr. Rodolfo Sicio Tamayo, OSA |
| 1984 - 1985 | Rev. Fr. Baltazar Labella Belocura, OSA |
| 1985 - 1987 | Rev. Fr. Danilo Cinco Dagsaan, OSA |
| 1987 - 1988 | Rev. Fr. Melchor Laguartilla Mirador, OSA |
| 1988 | Rev. Fr. Roger del Rosario Objaan, OSA |
| 1988 | Rev. Fr. Norberto Carpiso Casono, OSA |
| 1988 - 1989 | Rev. Fr. Marcelino Marquiño Malana, OSA |
| 1989 | Rev. Fr. Ambrosio Jamero Galindez, OSA |
| 1989 - 1993 | Rev. Fr. Nicolas Madronio Echeveria, OSA |
| 1993 - 1996 | Rev. Fr. Richard Lepasana Pido, OSA |
| 1996 - 1998 | Rev. Fr. Apolinario Lacaba Mejorada, OSA |
| 1998 - 2000 | Rev. Fr. Alejandro Pangahin Credo, OSA |
| 2000 - 2001 | Rev. Fr. Mamerto Allin Alfeche, OSA |
| 2001 - 2008 | Rev. Fr. Vicente Felisilda Amplayo, OSA |
| 2008 - 2012 | Rev. Fr. Jose Recinto Gonzales, OSA |
| 2012 - 2015 | Rev. Fr. Andres Rivera, OSA |
| 2015 | Rev. Fr. John Paul Mabanta, OSA |
| 2015 - 2018 | Rev. Fr. Tomas Banayag Jr., OSA |
| 2018 - 2021 | Rev. Fr. Basilio Sugata-on, OSA |
| 2021 - 2024 | Rev. Fr. Aimark Palma Asor, OSA |
| 2024 - present | Rev. Fr. Joselito Robles Martin |
