= V. Mapa station =

LRT Line 2 station in Manila

V. Mapa
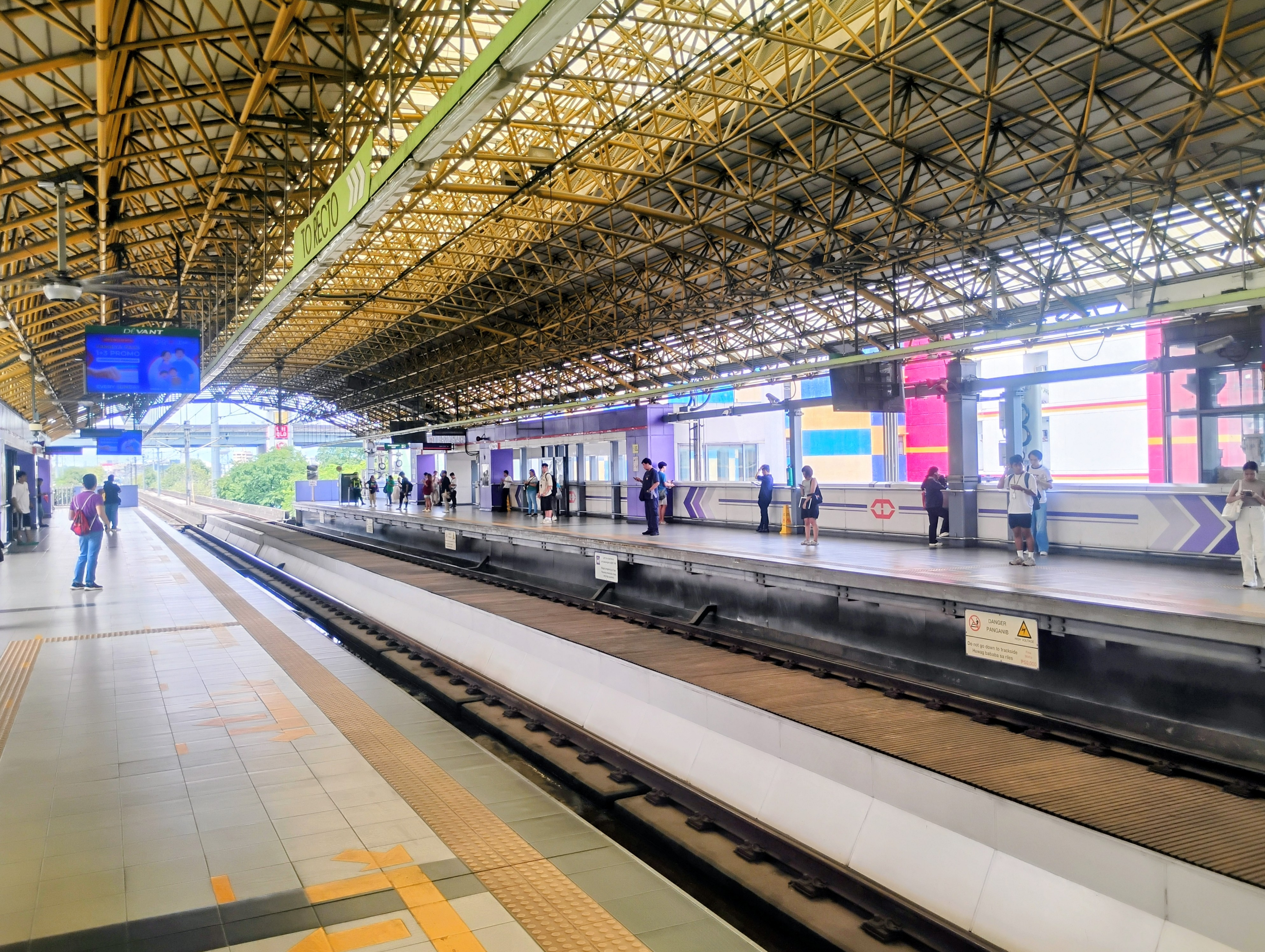

General information
- Location: Magsaysay Boulevard, Sampaloc; Manila, Metro Manila; Philippines
- Coordinates: 14°36′14″N 121°1′1″E
- Owner: Department of Transportation
- Operator: Light Rail Transit Authority
- Line: LRT Line 2
- Platforms: 2 (2 side)
- Tracks: 2
- Connections: 2 3 V. Mapa

Construction
- Structure type: Elevated
- Parking: Yes (SM City Santa Mesa, Hotel Sogo)
- Accessible: Concourse: South Entrance only Platforms: All platforms

Other information
- Station code: PL04

History
- Opened: April 5, 2004; 22 years ago
- Former names: G. Araneta

Services
Preceding station	Manila LRT	Following station
J. Ruiz towards Antipolo	LRT Line 2	Pureza towards Recto
Track layout
Location
- Location within Manila Location within Metro Manila Location within Luzon Location within Philippines

V. Mapa station is an elevated Light Rail Transit (LRT) station located on the LRT Line 2 (LRT-2) system in Sampaloc, Manila. It is one of the four stations in the line with a reserve track nearby (in front of the UERMMC) together with Santolan, Anonas and Araneta Center–Cubao. The station during its inception was formerly called as G. Araneta station, after the nearby Gregorio Araneta Avenue, but was renamed into the current name due to the minor realignment of some stations (the other being Betty Go-Belmonte) that has caused the change of proximity to the Victorino Mapa Street. The station serves the areas of Santa Mesa, Manila, Quezon City, and San Juan. The station is situated at Ramon Magsaysay Boulevard, near its intersection with Victorino Mapa Street in Santa Mesa, Manila.

The station is the tenth station for trains headed to Recto and the fourth station for trains headed to Antipolo. The station has a standard layout, with a concourse level and a platform level. The concourse is below the platform, with stairs, escalators, and elevators leading up to the platform level. The levels are separated by fare gates. The station is also sometimes referred to as Santa Mesa Station.

It is named after its location near the junction with V. Mapa Street, which was in turn named after Victorino Mapa, the second Chief Justice of the Supreme Court of the Philippines.

== Nearby landmarks ==
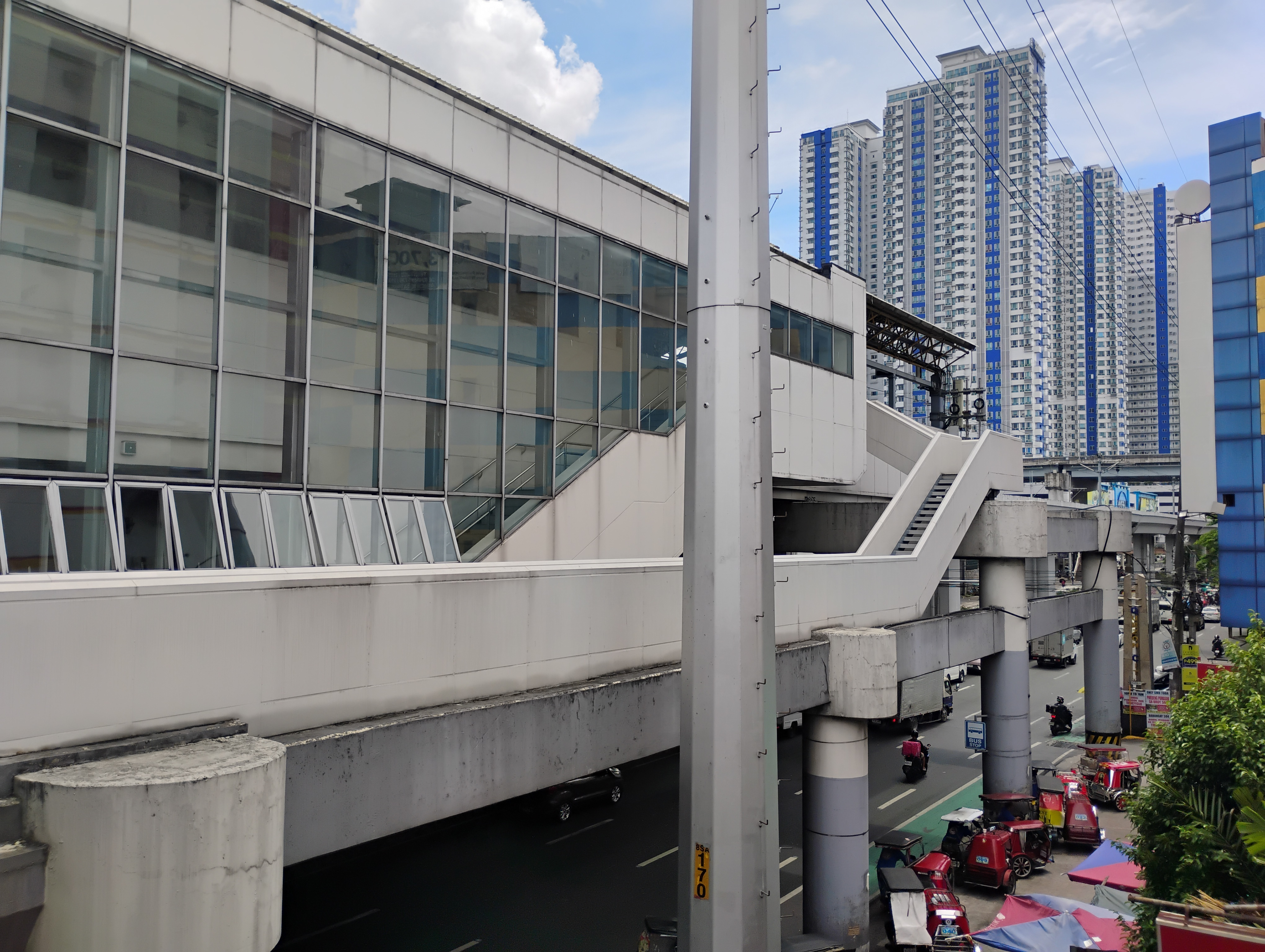
Façade of the station

The station is located near SM City Sta. Mesa, Mezza Residences, Hotel Sogo Santa Mesa, DormTel Santa Mesa, and several prominent universities, the Central Colleges of the Philippines, Immaculate Heart of Mary College, and the University of the East Ramon Magsaysay Memorial Medical Center.

=== Shops and services ===
Inside the concourse of the station are several stalls where people can buy food and drinks. The station is connected to Hotel Sogo Santa Mesa, making it more accessible. Safety notices are found within sight inside the station both in English and Filipino languages.

== Transportation links ==
There are numerous transportation links that are served by various public transport vehicle modes which can be used to navigate in and around the area. The station is situated near SM City Sta. Mesa, one of the premier malls in the country, which increases the number of passengers using the station. The station is also the most accessible for commuters heading to Greenhills and the Ortigas business districts, due to buses bound to Cainta and Taytay traversing the Ramon Magsaysay Boulevard–Gregorio Araneta Avenue–N. Domingo route on the way to Ortigas Avenue a few miles away.
