= Magsaysay Boulevard =

Major road in Manila, Philippines

Coordinates: 14°36′7″N 121°0′31″E

Ramon Magsaysay Boulevard
R-6
- Magsaysay Boulevard
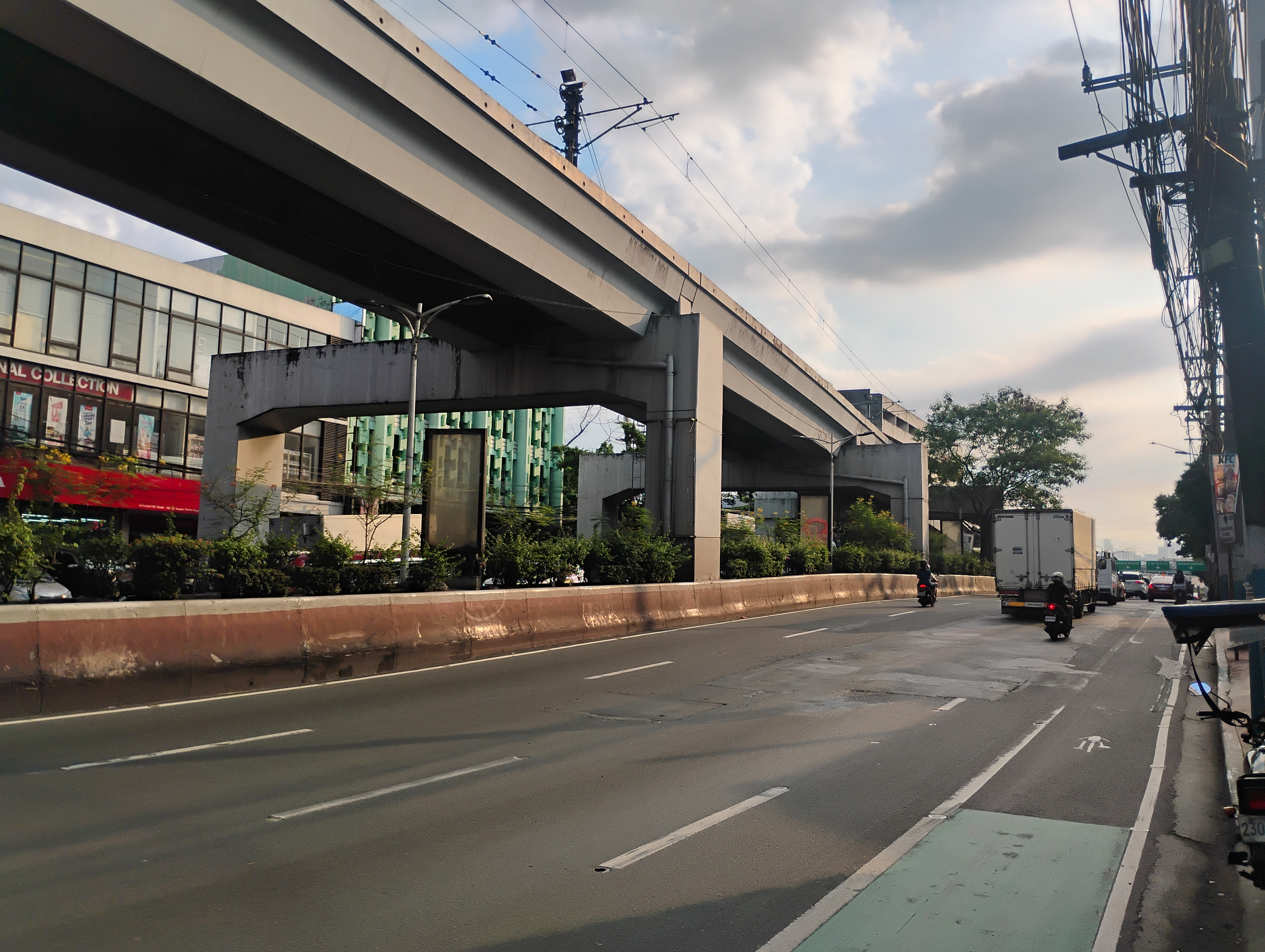
- Magsaysay Boulevard in 2026

- The route of Magsaysay Boulevard in Metro Manila. Magsaysay Boulevard is highlighted in red.
- Former names: Calle Santa Mesa; Santa Mesa Boulevard
- Namesake: Ramon Magsaysay
- Length: 2.2 km (1.4 mi)
- Component highways: R-6 R-6; N180
- Location: Manila and Quezon City
- West end: N140 (A.H. Lacson Avenue / Nagtahan Street) / N180 (Legarda Street) / J.P. Laurel Street in Manila
- Major junctions: N183 (Victorino Mapa Street); E2 (NLEX Connector)
- East end: N130 (Gregorio Araneta Avenue) / N180 (Aurora Boulevard) in Quezon City

Ramon Magsaysay Boulevard, also known simply as Magsaysay Boulevard and formerly as Santa Mesa Boulevard, is the principal artery of Santa Mesa in Manila, Philippines. It is a six-lane divided roadway that travels east–west from Gregorio Araneta Avenue near the city's border with Quezon City and San Juan to Lacson Avenue and the Nagtahan Interchange, close to the district of San Miguel. The entire length of the boulevard serves as the district boundary between Sampaloc in the north and Santa Mesa in the south, with the LRTA's Line 2 running along its median. East of Gregorio Araneta, the road continues as Aurora Boulevard, while west of Lacson, it extends as Legarda Street via Legarda Flyover into San Miguel and Quiapo.

The LRTA Line 2 system has two stations along Magsaysay, namely Pureza and V. Mapa. It is also served by the Santa Mesa railway station near the Polytechnic University of the Philippines campus on Hipodromo and Anonas Streets.

The boulevard was named after the seventh president of the Philippines, Ramon Magsaysay. Until 1963, it was called Santa Mesa Boulevard, which in turn was formerly called Calle Santa Mesa.

== Route description ==
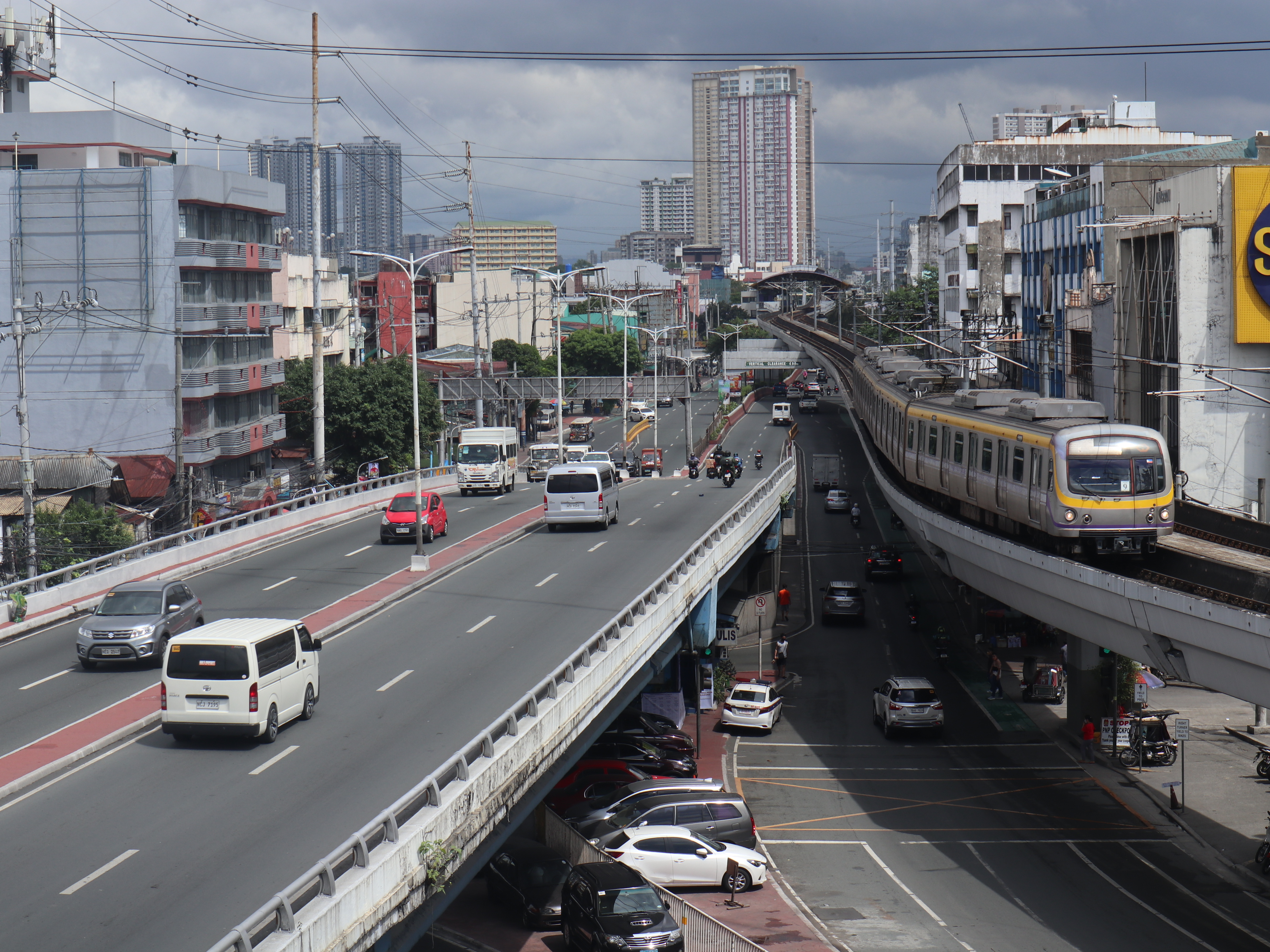
View of Magsaysay Boulevard from Nagtahan Interchange

Magsaysay Boulevard is an all-divided road that starts as a continuation of Legarda Street past Lacson Avenue and Nagtahan Street, both components of Circumferential Road 2 (C-2), at Nagtahan Interchange. LRT Line 2 follows wholly the length of the road, with two stations built above. The road has numerous traffic light intersections and side streets throughout its length. Major establishments, like the Polytechnic University of the Philippines, Sogo Grand Hotel, and SM City Sta. Mesa (formerly SM Centerpoint), lie around or near the road.

== History ==
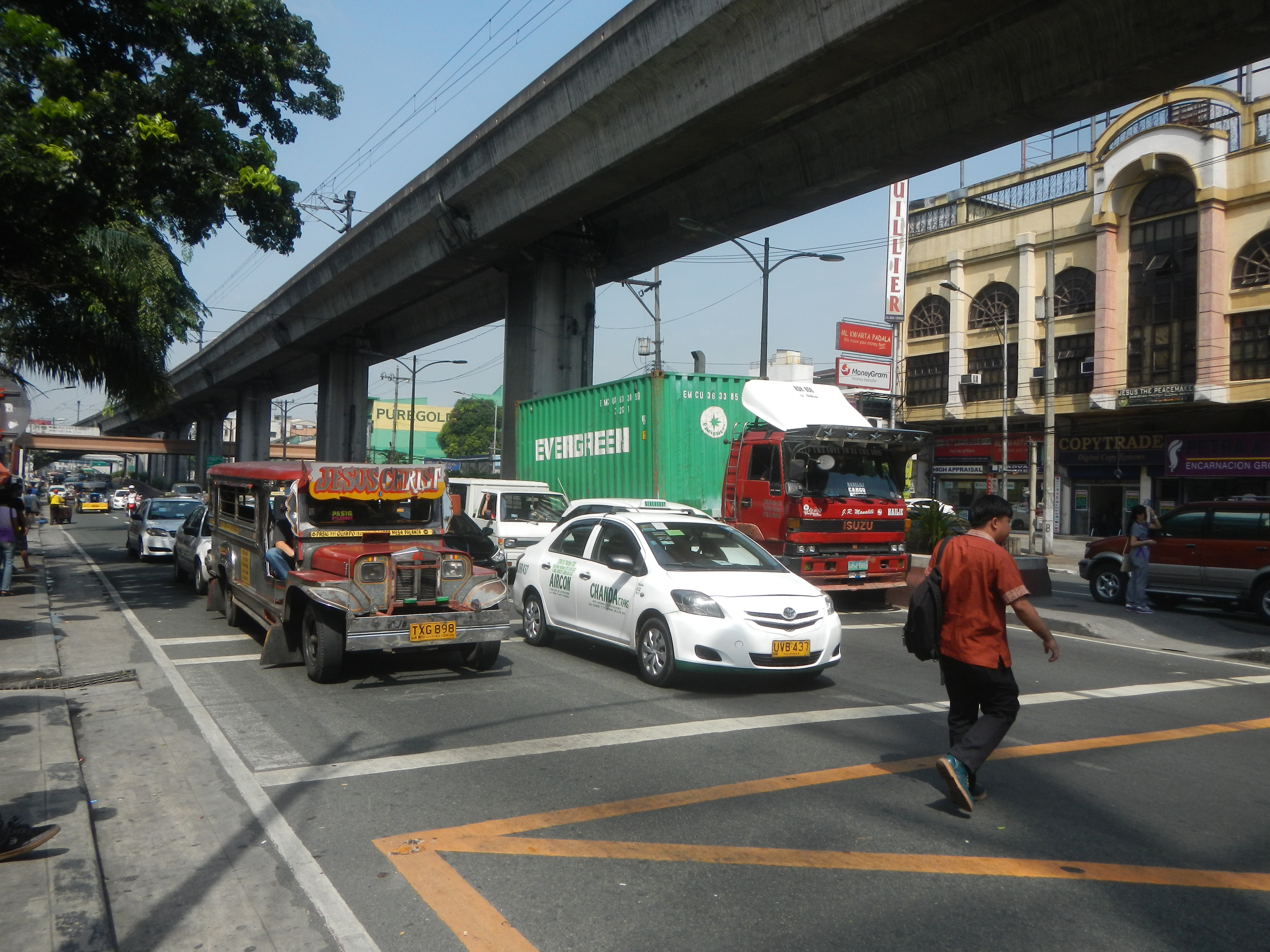
Magsaysay Boulevard at the Pureza Street intersection

The boulevard traces its origin to an old road named Calle Santa Mesa, which would later be known as Santa Mesa Boulevard, and a short segment leading to Calle Santol (now Santol Street). It also formed part of Highway 53. The road, now known as Old Santa Mesa Street, was part of the original Calle Santa Mesa, up to the San Juan Bridge, wherein what is now the current alignment of Ramon Magsaysay Boulevard was later extended from Santol Street to Quezon City. Its present-day section between Nagtahan and Old Santa Mesa Road was also the former right-of-way of tranvia until 1945. Manila's first flyover, later known as R. Magsaysay Bridge II, was built along the boulevard in the 1950s to facilitate the passage of vehicles crossing over the Philippine National Railways tracks.

On August 31, 1960, coinciding with the 53rd birth anniversary of the late President Ramon Magsaysay, the Manila Municipal Board (now the Manila City Council) enacted Ordinance No. 4745, renaming Santa Mesa Boulevard to Ramon Magsaysay Boulevard in his honor. Re-enacted on March 26, 1963, the renaming was subsequently approved by Manila Mayor Antonio Villegas on May 8, 1963.

The construction of the second line of the LRTA system began in 1997, with the boulevard being one of its routes. The segment was later opened to train operations in 2004. R. Magsaysay Bridge II was decommissioned in 2022 to make way for the NLEX Connector, which would cross between the boulevard's ground level and the elevated LRTA tracks. The Connector's interchange with the boulevard opened on October 28, 2023.

== Intersections ==
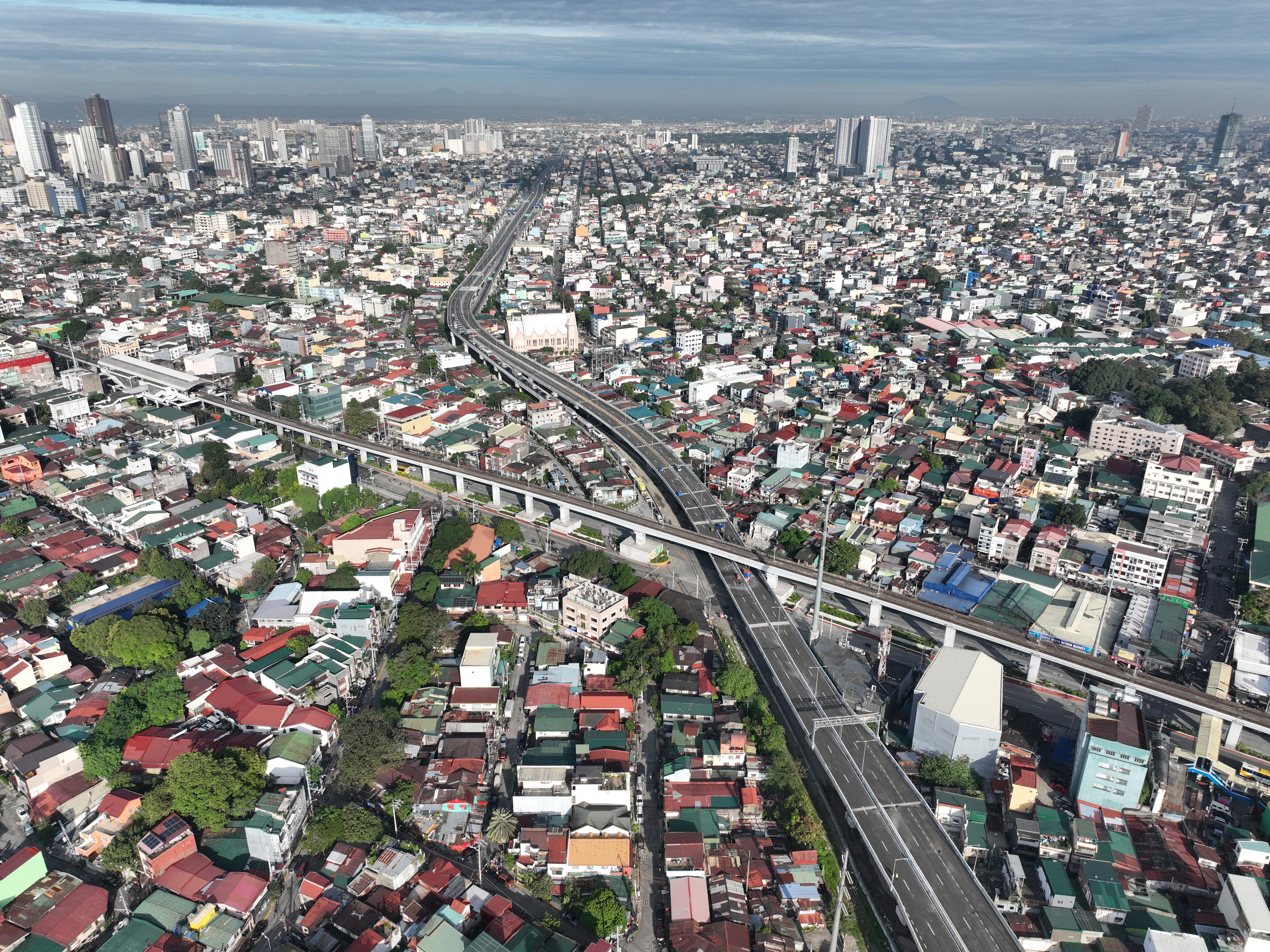
Intersection with NLEX Connector's Magsaysay Interchange and the former PNR Metro South Commuter Line (2026)

Province	City/Municipality	km	mi	Destinations	Notes
Manila		4.205	2.613	N140 (A.H. Lacson Avenue / Nagtahan Street) / J.P. Laurel Street	Nagtahan Interchange; traffic light intersection; continues westward as N180 (Legarda Street)
Manila				East end of Nagtahan Interchange	
Manila				M. Francisco Street	Westbound only
Manila				Valencia Street	Eastbound only
Manila				M. Dela Rosa Street	Westbound only
Manila				Marzan Street	Westbound only
Manila				Vicente Cruz Street	Westbound only
Manila		4.111	2.554	R. Magsaysay Bridge I over Estero de Valencia	
Manila				De Dios Street	Eastbound only
Manila				D. Ampil Street	Eastbound only
Manila				Pureza Street	Traffic light intersection; access to Polytechnic University of the Philippines. No left turn from both directions.
Manila				Maganda Street	Westbound only
Manila				Algeria Street	Westbound only
Manila				Fortuna Street	Eastbound only
Manila				Hipodromo Street	Eastbound only
Manila				Paltok Street	Westbound only
Manila		4.935– 5.135	3.066– 3.191	R. Magsaysay Bridge II over the PNR Metro South Commuter Line (1972–2022; demolished)	
Manila				E2 (NLEX Connector) – Tarlac, C-3, Port of Manila	R. Magsaysay Exit of NLEX Connector. Traffic light intersection.
Manila				D. Santiago Street	Westbound only
Manila				Altura Street	Unsignaled intersection; access to PNR Santa Mesa Station
Manila				Old Santa Mesa Street	Traffic light intersection. Former alignment of Santa Mesa Boulevard. No left turn from Westbound. Right turns from eastbound accessible via Santol Extension.
Manila				Santol Street	Traffic light intersection. Former eastern terminus. No left turn from both directions.
Manila				Guadalcanal Street	Eastbound only
Manila		5.818	3.615	N183 (Victorino Mapa Street)	Traffic light intersection
Manila				Hotel Sogo Santa Mesa Access Road	Eastbound only; access to Hotel Sogo Santa Mesa
Manila				Sociego Street	Westbound only
Manila				Baldovino Street	Eastbound only
Manila – Quezon City boundary				North Manila–Quezon City 2nd boundary	
Quezon City				SM City Santa Mesa Access Road	Eastbound only; access to SM City Santa Mesa
Quezon City		6.306	3.918	N130 (Gregorio Araneta Avenue)	Traffic light intersection; continues eastward as N180 (Aurora Boulevard)
1.000 mi = 1.609 km; 1.000 km = 0.621 mi: Closed/former; Incomplete access

== Landmarks ==
SM City Sta. Mesa

This is from Nagtahan interchange (west) to Gregorio Araneta Avenue (east).

- Savemore Market Nagtahan
- Polytechnic University of the Philippines
- Pureza station
- NLEX Connector Magsaysay exit
- V. Mapa station
- SM City Sta. Mesa

== See also ==
- Major roads in Manila
- Media related to Magsaysay Boulevard (Manila) at Wikimedia Commons
