= SM City Sta. Mesa =

Shopping mall in Quezon City, Philippines

SM City Santa Mesa

- The facade of SM City Sta. Mesa in 2023
- Location: Quezon City, Metro Manila, Philippines
- Coordinates: 14°36′16″N 121°01′08″E
- Address: R. Magsaysay Blvd./Aurora Boulevard cor. G. Araneta Ave., Barangay Doña Imelda
- Opened: September 28, 1990; 36 years ago
- Previous names: SM Centerpoint (1990–2005)
- Developer: SM Prime Holdings
- Manager: SM Prime Holdings
- Num. of stores: 200 shops and restaurants
- Num. of anchor tenants: 12
- Floor area: 133,327 m^{2} (1,435,120 sq ft)
- Floors: Main Building: 4 + basement level
- Public transit: V. Mapa; 2 3 V. Mapa
- Website: SM City Sta Mesa

SM City Sta. Mesa, formerly known as SM Centerpoint, is a shopping mall located at Magsaysay Boulevard corner Gregorio Araneta Avenue, Barangay Doña Imelda, Quezon City, Metro Manila, Philippines. It is the second SM Supermall, second in Quezon City, and the seventh SM branch developed and operated by SM Prime Holdings owned by Henry Sy, Sr. It has a land area of 3 hectares (7.4 acres) and has a gross floor area of an approximate 133,327 m^{2} (1,435,120 sq ft).

== History ==
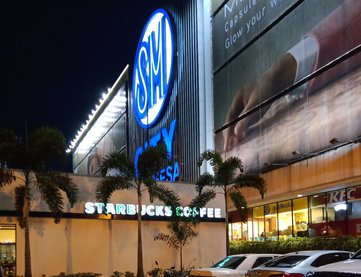
Earlier facade design of mall in 2019

The mall was opened to the public on September 28, 1990, and was the second SM Supermall to open after the then-largest SM Supermall in the country, SM North EDSA. It was initially named SM Centerpoint as it is located very near the tripoint of the City of Manila, Quezon City and what was then the municipality of San Juan. The mall featured several amusement venues, namely Quantum, Worlds of Fun and a two-storey annex building. To celebrate its 15th anniversary, the mall was rebranded SM City Sta. Mesa since it borders the Santa Mesa district of Manila despite being under the territorial jurisdiction of Barangay Doña Imelda, Quezon City.

On September 26, 2009, the basement level was flooded when Typhoon Ondoy (Ketsana) battered the capital. The appliance center, supermarket, food court, and other retail stores located at the basement level were heavily damaged. The basement level was temporarily closed for several days.

The mall is currently under renovation (formerly had 10 cinemas), which started with the demolition of the mall's cinemas, (8 out of 10 cinemas, Cinemas 1 to 4 and 7 to 10), for conversion to stadium seating (with the exception of the two remaining cinemas, Cinemas 5 and 6 which was on regular operations until March 14, 2020 (the start of the COVID-19 pandemic in the Philippines), construction of Director's Club cinema, and replacement of the mall's facade. A portion of the mall's former cinema wing now houses the new SM Food Hall, replacing the former SM Foodcourt at the lower ground level, along with leisure tenants. The SM Food Hall opened on May 15, 2021, while the cinema will reopen by phases, with the regular cinema opening on November 30, 2021 (November 29, 2021, for the early release screening of Marvel's Eternals). The Director's Club Cinema opened on May 15, 2022, located at the 4th floor.

== Amenities ==
Daytime image of SM City Sta. Mesa

V. Mapa LRT Station, which provides access to SM City Sta. Mesa

The Mall is the main structure of SM City Sta. Mesa, the second of SM Supermall constructed. It features and houses most anchors, the department store, all the amusement venues, the main atrium, all the theater houses, most of the restaurants, all the retail stores and most of the entertainment venues and other services. All the major anchors are located within the vicinity of the structure. The mall has undergone several renovations for better guest accommodations and serves the daily foot traffic of about 200,000 people.

The Carpark Building is a four-story structure which serves thousands of vehicles daily and is adjacent to the mall.

The two-storey Annex Building of the mall was one of the first annex buildings built and constructed by SM Prime Holdings. Its operations began at the opening of the mall. The Annex Building houses several junior anchors and is located east of the main mall.

Preceded by SM North EDSA	2nd SM Supermall; 1990	Succeeded by SM Megamall
