= MRT Line 4 (Metro Manila) =

Rapid transit line in Metro Manila

Overview
- Status: Approved
- Owner: Government of the Philippines; Department of Transportation
- Line number: 4
- Locale: Metro Manila and Rizal
- Termini: EDSA; Taytay (near NCBA and Muzon and SM City Taytay)
- Stations: 10

Service
- Type: Rapid transit
- System: Manila MRT
- Services: 1
- Depot(s): Excelsior Villas site, Taytay
- Rolling stock: 5-car electric multiple units
- Daily ridership: 400,000 (est.)

History
- Planned opening: c. 2033; 7 years' time

Technical
- Line length: 12.7 km (7.9 mi)
- Num of tracks: Double-track
- Character: Elevated railway
- Track gauge: 1,435 mm (4 ft 8 1/2 in)
- Electrification: 1,500 V DC overhead lines
- Operating speed: 80 km/h (50 mph)
- Signalling: CBTC, ATO (GoA 4)

The Manila Metro Rail Transit Line 4 (MRT-4) is a proposed rapid transit line that would serve the Greater Manila Area of the Philippines. The 12.7 km (7.9 mi), 10-station elevated railway would connect Ortigas Center in Metro Manila and the Greater Manila Area municipality of Taytay, Rizal. It would traverse along Ortigas Avenue and Manila East Road, starting at the former's junction with EDSA in Quezon City to the west until it terminates near the New Taytay Public Market to the east.

Originally proposed as a "heavy monorail" based on the likes of Chongqing Rail Transit's Line 3, the project was revised into a conventional rail system in 2022 upon the recommendation of the project consultants commissioned by the Department of Transportation. Initially expected to cost an estimated ₱59.3 billion (US$1.1 billion), it was raised to ₱87 billion due to design changes. An initial US$1 billion loan from the Asian Development Bank was signed in November 2024, while additional funding is being sought from the Asian Infrastructure Investment Bank.

== History ==
=== Background ===
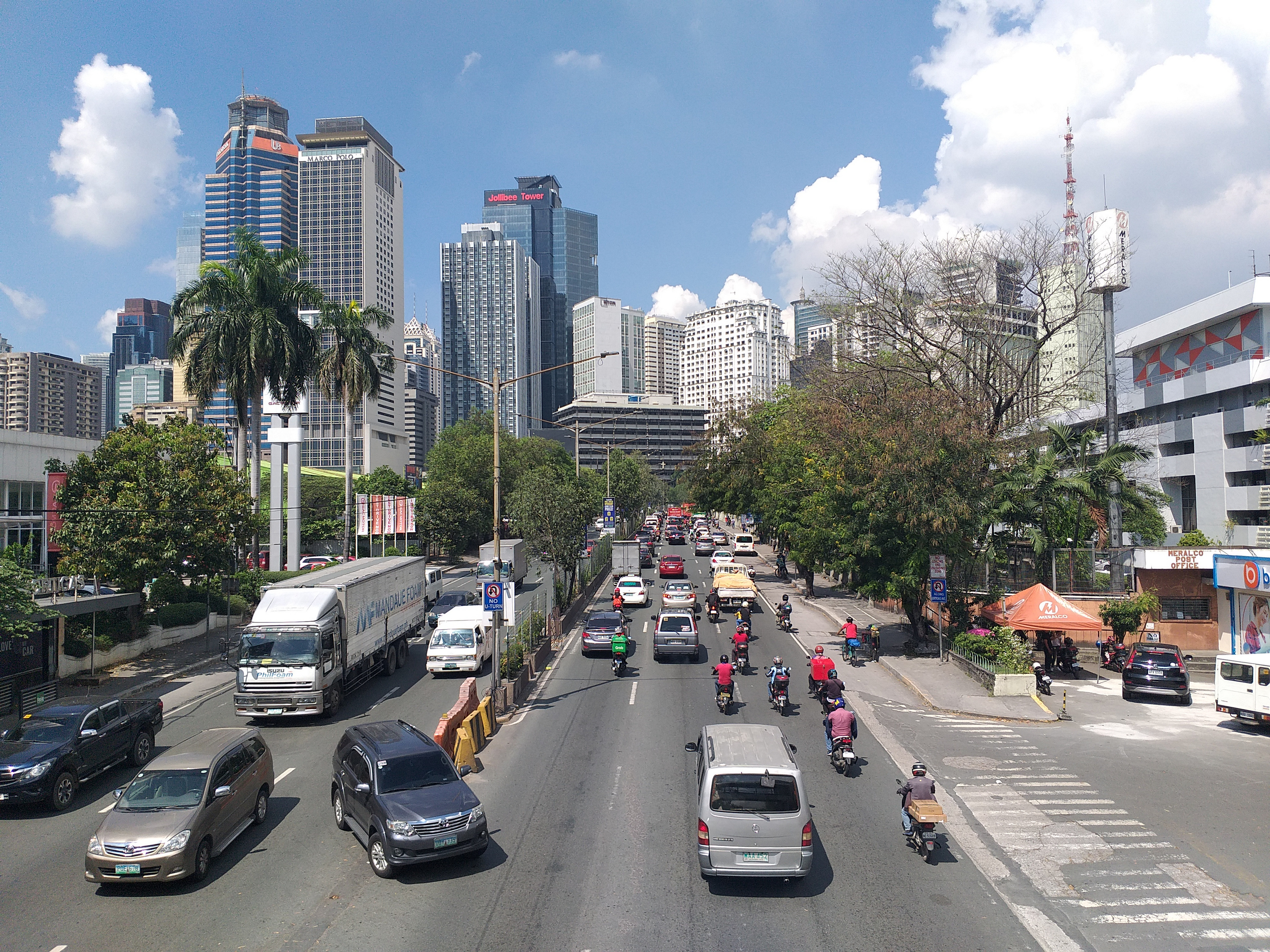
Ortigas Avenue in 2021.

In 1994, the proposal's origins came when the original Line 4 was conceptualized by the Ramos administration with a study by SOFRETU, a French firm. Meanwhile, Spanish firms and Halcrow also participated in the study. The plan would have been an 18.35 km (11.40 mi) partly elevated light rail line that would run from Welcome Rotonda to Quirino Highway, entirely in Quezon City. A year later, a French consortium led by Javlon International and Bouygues, as well as local firm Ayala Land, submitted the proposal to the government for the proposed elevated railway that would run from the Old Bilibid Prison in Santa Cruz, Manila to Batasan in Quezon City, totaling 15.1 km (9.4 mi), while the depot was to be located in the vicinity of the University of the Philippines Diliman campus in Quezon City, as well as the planned extension to Novaliches. The project was approved numerous times in 1995 and first passed in 1998 with a cost of ₱16 billion in budget. It was scheduled to be done in 1999; however, the project would later be shelved when the original proposal status was eventually lost. According to the Metro Manila Urban Transportation Integration Study, the rolling stock was supposed to have 5-car light rail vehicles.

As part of the MMUTIS published by the Japan International Cooperation Agency, the proposal was also included. Meanwhile, the right of way for the present Line 4 can be traced to the southeast extension of the LRT Line 2, which would either be an automated guideway transit (AGT) or heavy rail line in the same fashion as the Line 2, as well as a bus rapid transit collector line towards the town of Binangonan in Rizal. However, this would utilize the Shaw Boulevard alignment due to developmental conditions at the time. In the late 2010s, the Quezon Memorial Circle–Batasan Hills segment became the MRT Line 7.

As of 2021, the Ortigas Avenue corridor has an annual average daily traffic of 185,699 vehicles. However, only 9.07 percent of daily traffic comes from public utility vehicles including taxis. An average commute from Tikling in Taytay, Rizal to Ortigas Center can take up to 3 hours during rush hour. This is the primary motivation to build a rail line in the vicinity to improve journey times between the two areas.

=== Development ===
A new LRT Line 4 project, was approved by the Investment Coordination Committee (ICC) of the National Economic and Development Authority in June 2015 as a public–private partnership project, with construction slated to begin in 2017 and a targeted opening date in 2021. In 2017, businessman Salvador Zamora II offered a proposal with a Swiss challenge, and he said in a 2017 interview that he had initial talks with the Department of Transportation. Also in that same year, the proposal was to tap Chinese firms to build. However, the initial project was not pushed through until it was approved for a second time on December 20, 2019.

The contract for the architectural and engineering design of the project was signed by the DOTr and IDOM Consulting Engineering, Architecture, SA on October 1, 2021. Meanwhile, on March 30, 2023, the contract for the consultancy services for the operations and maintenance of the line was signed by DOTr and Australia-based Ricardo Rail.

On October 12, 2022, the Department of Transportation confirmed that the Asian Development Bank (ADB) will extend a loan of US$1 billion for the project. The loan agreement, which was initially expected to be signed in 2023, was delayed to 2024 due to undisclosed reasons and again to 2025. The loan was finalized and secured in November 2024. The government is aiming to begin groundbreaking for the project within the 1st quarter of 2025, as the DOTr is set to finalize the engineering design of the project. In January 2025, it was announced that the construction of the line will begin next year. The DOTr will coordinate closely with other agencies like the Metropolitan Manila Development Authority (MMDA) and the Philippine National Police (PNP) to address the expected heavy traffic that the construction will bring.

In August 2025, the DOTr officially announced that 80 local and international companies took part in a consultation.

However, the project got delayed several times; the DOTr announced Ortigas Avenue will have its own exclusive lanes for buses, and this road became one of 3 routes to have a busway.

=== Construction ===
Pre-construction activities such as soil testing have already begun in some areas along Ortigas Avenue. Actual construction is expected to begin in 2028 and full operations shall begin by 2033.

In May 2024, the House of Representatives briefing presentation on Metro Manila development has been addressing right of way issues for the project, including public utilities.

There are five main components in the project. This includes one each for the mainline, station buildings, depot, electromechanical systems and rolling stock. The presentation indicates that these contract packages are:

- Contract Package 401: Construction of 5.5 km of the main line viaduct and half of the stations,
- Contract Package 402: Construction of 7.2 km of the main line viaduct and half of the stations; and
- Contract Package 403: Construction of the civil works for the depot and the receiving substation.

According to the presentation, there are planned options for contract packages for E&M, trackworks, and rolling stock.

- Option 1: Contract Package 404 involves E&M works and trackworks, while Contract Package 405 involves the procurement of rolling stock.
- Option 2: Contract Package 404b involves E&M works, trackworks, and rolling stock.

=== Alignment between Ortigas Center and LRT-2 ===
The line is a component of the Manila East Rail Transit Project proposed by the Japanese government in February 2015 which aims to provide a light rapid transit line connecting central and eastern Metro Manila with the province of Rizal. Its proposed alignment is along Ortigas Avenue with an option to extend the line to as far east as the Rizal municipality of Angono on the Manila East Road, and west to either of the following terminals:

- Option 1: interchange with Santa Mesa station (PNR Metro South Commuter Line) via ADB Avenue, Sheridan Street, Pioneer Street, Boni Avenue, Aglipay Street and Lubiran Street.
- Option 2: interchange with V. Mapa station (LRT Line 2) via ADB Avenue, Shaw Boulevard, P. Sanchez Street and V. Mapa Street.
- Option 3: interchange with Gilmore station (LRT Line 2) via a straight path following Ortigas Avenue and Gilmore Avenue in San Juan and its western extension Granada Street in Quezon City.

Option 2 was the chosen alignment of the study owing to its capability to serve the most demand that can alleviate traffic the most on the Taytay-Cainta-Pasig-Mandaluyong-Manila corridor. Construction did not push through despite receiving approval by President Benigno Aquino III last September 2015.

=== Antipolo Cable Car Project ===
The Department of Transportation (DOTr) announced that the Philippines' first cable car system may be operational by 2028. Dubbed the Antipolo Cable Car Project, the DOTr plans to have the cable car ferry passengers from the planned Taytay station in the MRT Line 4 to Antipolo. During a Build Better More forum, DOTr Undersecretary Timothy Batan said a feasibility study will be conducted in mid-2025 to determine the project cost, passenger capacity, and other details. The bidding for the project is expected to take place in 2026, with a potential construction period of two years. If the project is awarded in 2026, the cable car system could be operational by 2028. The ADB financed the pre-feasibility study, including the detailed feasibility of the project.

The Antipolo Cable Car Project is intended to complement the MRT-4, providing additional connectivity for residents and economic activities in the densely populated area of Antipolo.

== Design ==
The line will be a generally elevated mass rapid transit (MRT) railway with two tracks.

Originally approved as a heavy monorail line in its MRT Line 4 iteration, the Project Description for scoping (PDS) published in September 2022 presented the possible options of constructing the line as a monorail, a "light rail transit" (LRT) system, or as a "mass rapid transit" (MRT) system. Of the three options, the MRT option was strongly recommended by IDOM due to ease of maintenance and abundance of technical suppliers. In addition to this, studies conducted by IDOM also determined that the ridership demand along the San Juan-Rizal corridor was higher than expected. Because of this, the recommendation to use a MRT system was accepted by the Department of Transportation later that month.

The guideway will use three different girder designs for the elevated sections: segmental box, precast concrete U-type and dapped-end girders. However, the design of the box girders will be different to that of the North–South Commuter Railway, having a more rounded U shape than that of the boxier design of the NSCR girders.

The line is expected to have a headway of 4 minutes, and can be further lessened to 2 minutes with the introduction of CBTC signaling.

=== Stations ===
The stations are divided into two types: the narrow-width and the standard-width stations. For both types, the platform length is consistently 120 meters (390 ft) long. These will also have three levels with one each for ground access, concourse and platforms to be built on top of center islands. The narrow width stations are 17 meters (56 ft) wide and instead of having its own ground level entries, it will utilize neighboring commercial structures to access the concourse. The standard-width types are 28 meters (92 ft) wide and will have its own dedicated ground-level entrance.

EDSA station will have its own design, being 150 meters (492 ft 2 in) long and will have 2 different concourses.

=== Rolling stock ===
The line will initially use 5-car electric multiple unit trains. The stations are also designed for an expansion to 6 cars. The car length for each train is 20 meters (65 ft 7 in) including couplers, which would mean a total length of 100 meters (328 ft 1 in) for the initial 5-car trains and 120 meters (393 ft 8 in) for the 6-car trains. A 5-car train is capable of carrying 1,000 passengers. To achieve the 4-minute headway target, up to 35 trainsets shall be ordered which corresponds to the number of rolling stock operators in the operations stage. The trains will also be 2.8 meters (9 ft 2 in) wide.

The electrification system will be at 1,500 volts DC using overhead lines as with the LRT Line 2 and the North–South Commuter Railway.

=== Depot ===
The Project Description for Scoping (PDS) report recommends the construction of the depot at the former Excelsior Villas site in Taytay, Rizal. It is located at the Rizal end of the line near the municipal hall. Other options include a vacant lot beside SM Taytay and at the Comeco compound in Pasig. The other two sites were put as secondary alternative locations to the Excelsior site as these require additional land acquisition. The Comeco location would also need a significant realignment in the right of way.

The depot is expected to have a 24-hour operation and will have stabling facilities, stabling track, traverser system, train storage, workshops and substation facilities.

== Route ==
The project will start at the intersection of EDSA and Ortigas Avenue in Quezon City. It will traverse the Ortigas Avenue corridor until Tikling area in Taytay, Rizal. It will then follow the Taytay Diversion Road alignment until the line ends at the Manila East Road in Taytay. The route is approximately 12.7 km (7.9 mi) long. Its depot will be located in Taytay, at the site of the cancelled Excelsior Villas development beside Club Manila East and Taytay Municipal Hall.

The line was originally planned to be 15.56 km (9.67 mi) long with 12 stations. This would have includes the proposed stations of Greenhills, Santolan, and N. Domingo, where the last station would have had an interchange with the LRT Line 2 in Quezon City. According to the project proponent, the N. Domingo to EDSA segment was dropped due to low demand. A 2015 plan conceptualized the western terminus near V. Mapa while a 2019 plan conceptualized it at Gilmore station.

According to the project's EIS report, the original alignment of the line to terminate near Gilmore was strongly opposed by barangay officials of New Manila and residents of affluent residential subdivisions in Greenhills and Wack-Wack on privacy, security, and environmental grounds. The residents urged that the line should not be built towards their areas or should be built underground or replaced with alternatives such as bus rapid transit.

Legend
†	Future terminus

List of stations
Station Code	Station Name	Distance (km)		Connections	Location
Station Code	Station Name	Between stations	Total	Connections	Location
OL01	EDSA †	—	—	Out-of-station interchange with Manila MRT: Ortigas	Quezon City
OL02	Meralco	—	—	Out-of-station interchange with Manila MRT: MMS Ortigas; Bus routes: 2 The Medical City Ortigas	Pasig City
OL03	Tiendesitas	—	—	Bus routes: 2 65 Frontera Drive	Pasig City
OL04	Rosario	—	—	Bus routes: 2 65 Rosario	Pasig City
OL05	St. Joseph (Note: The St. Joseph station of MRT-4 refers to Saint Joseph Subdivision, which is officially recognized as part of Barangay Santo Domingo, Cainta. This is due to a boundary dispute between Pasig and Cainta in which the Regional Trial Court (RTC) ruled in favor of Cainta on October 6, 2021. However, other places in the vicinity of Santo Domingo such as SM East Ortigas, the DABBA Subdivision, and Riverside 2 (which is located in front of Ciudad Grande Executive Village at the most end-point of Cainta) are still not yet considered officially part of Pasig by the court.)	—	—	Bus routes: 2 65 SM East Ortigas	Cainta, Rizal
OL06	Cainta Junction	—	—	Bus routes: 2 65 Robinsons Cainta	Cainta, Rizal
OL07	San Juan (Note: Not to be mistaken for San Juan City in Metro Manila. The station is proposed to be located in Barangay San Juan, Cainta near the Valley Golf Country Club and Sierra Valley Gardens.)	—	—	Bus routes: 2 65 RRCG P2P Greenbelt - Sierra Valley	Cainta, Rizal
OL08	Tikling	—	—	Bus routes: 2 65 Tikling, Taytay	Taytay, Rizal
OL09	Manila East Road	—	—	—	Taytay, Rizal
OL10	Taytay †	—	—	—	Taytay, Rizal
