= Victorino Mapa =

Chief Justice of the Philippines from 1920 to 1921

The Honorable Victorino M. Mapa
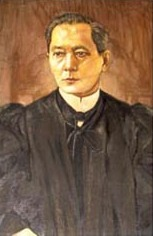

2nd Chief Justice of the Philippines
- In office July 1, 1920 – October 31, 1921
- Appointed by: Woodrow Wilson
- Preceded by: Cayetano Arellano
- Succeeded by: Manuel Araullo

Secretary of Finance and Justice
- In office November 1, 1913 – June 30, 1920
- Appointed by: Francis Burton Harrison
- Preceded by: Gregorio S. Araneta
- Succeeded by: Quintín Paredes

Member of the Second Philippine Commission
- In office October 27, 1913 – October 16, 1916

3rd Associate Justice of the Supreme Court of the Philippines
- In office June 15, 1901 – October 31, 1913
- Appointed by: William McKinley
- Preceded by: Position created
- Succeeded by: Manuel Araullo

Personal details
- Born: 25 February 1855 Kalibo, Capiz, Captaincy General of the Philippines
- Died: 12 April 1927 (aged 72) Manila, Philippine Islands
- Resting place: La Loma Cemetery
- Education: Colegio de San Juan de Letran; University of Santo Tomas

Victorino Montaño Mapa (February 25, 1855 – April 12, 1927) was an Associate Justice of the Supreme Court of the Philippines and later, as the second Chief Justice of the Supreme Court of the Philippines under the American colonial Insular Government.

== Career ==
He was homeschooled during his childhood. Later, he earned his Bachelor of Arts from Colegio de San Juan de Letran and his degree of Bachelor of Laws and Jurisprudence from the University of Santo Tomas at the age of 25.

He was appointed an associate justice of the newly created Supreme Court of the Philippines in 1901, together with Cayetano Arellano and Florentino Torres. He left the Supreme Court to be Secretary of Finance and Justice in 1913 during which he also served on the Philippine Commission, the upper house of the Philippine Legislature.

Upon Arellano's retirement in 1920, he was appointed the second Chief Justice. His tenure was brief, as his frail health forced him to retire early on October 31, 1921. He died on April 12, 1927. On April 29, or 17 days later, his fellow retired justice, Florentino Torres, also died.

== Legacy ==
Victorino Mapa High School, Victorino Mapa Street, and the nearby V. Mapa LRT Station, all in Manila, are named after him.

Legal offices
New seat	Associate Justice of the Supreme Court of the Philippines; 1903–1913	Succeeded by Manuel Araullo
Preceded by Cayetano Arellano	Chief Justice of the Supreme Court of the Philippines; 1920–1921	Succeeded by Manuel Araullo
Government offices
Preceded by Gregorio S. Araneta	Secretary of Finance and Justice; 1913–1920	Succeeded by Alberto Barreto as Secretary of Finance
Preceded by Gregorio S. Araneta	Secretary of Finance and Justice; 1913–1920	Succeeded by Quintín Paredes as Secretary of Justice
