= Victorino Mapa Street =

Road in Manila, Philippines

Coordinates: 14°35′57″N 121°1′1″E

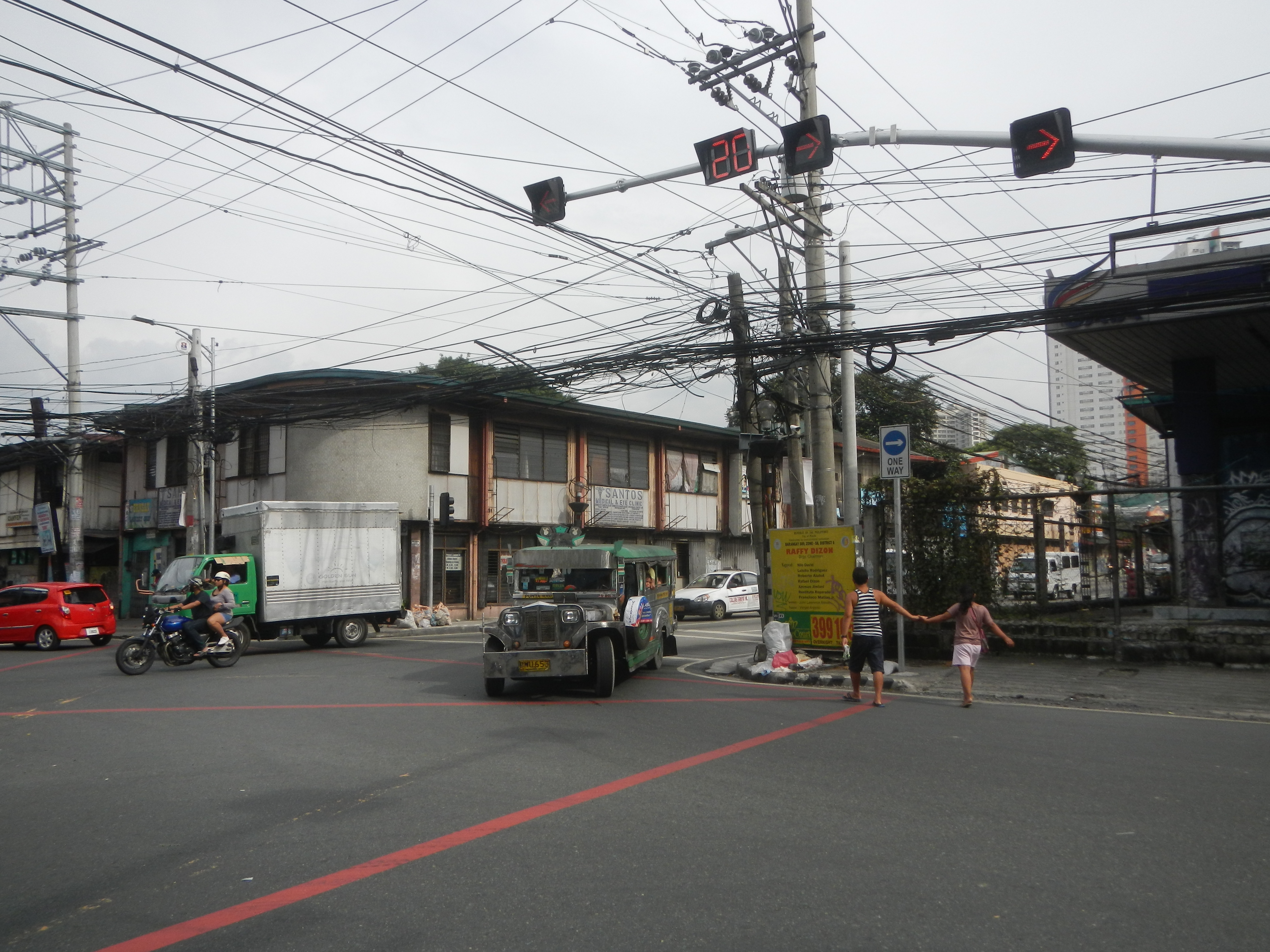
- Intersection of V. Mapa Street and Old Sta. Mesa Street in Santa Mesa
- Interactive map of Victorino Mapa Street
- Former names: Calle Buenavista; Pasig Boulevard
- Namesake: Victorino Mapa
- Maintained by: Department of Public Works and Highways - North Manila District Engineering Office (Note: DPWH maintenance covers the major road sections, from Magsaysay Boulevard to P. Sanchez Street only.)
- Length: 1.6 km (0.99 mi)
- Component highways: N141 from Valenzuela Street to P. Sanchez Street; N183 from Magsaysay Boulevard to Valenzuela Street
- Location: Santa Mesa, Manila
- West end: N180 (Magsaysay Boulevard)
- Major junctions: Old Santa Mesa Road; N141 (Valenzuela Street); N141 (P. Sanchez Street)
- East end: Pat Antonio Street

Victorino Mapa Street, also known by its short form V. Mapa Street, is the main west–east road in the district of Santa Mesa in Manila, Philippines. The street, including its eastern extension, runs for 1.6 kilometers (0.99 mi) from the junction with Magsaysay Boulevard in the north to Pat Antonio Street in the southeast by the San Juan River. It is home to Don Bosco School, Manila, Unciano Colleges and General Hospital, several new condominiums, and a few motels.

A portion of the street forms part of Radial Road 5 (R-5) of Manila's arterial road network, where it links with Padre Sanchez Street (named after Jesuit priest Francisco de Paula Sanchez from the Ateneo Municipal de Manila) and eventually connects to Shaw Boulevard in Mandaluyong. It is served by V. Mapa LRT Station along Magsaysay Boulevard. Its section from its northern terminus at Magsaysay Boulevard to Valenzuela Street is designated part of National Route 183 (N183), while its section from Valenzuela Street to P. Sanchez Street is designated as part of National Route 141 (N141); both numbered routes are part of the Philippine highway system. The rest of the route up to Pat Antonio Street is unnumbered.

== History ==
Victorino Mapa Street, formerly known as Calle Buenavista, was one of the earliest streets laid out by the Spanish government in the former pueblo of Santa Mesa. It was the home of the old Sociedad de Tiro al Blanco (Manila Gun Club), located near the junction with Calle Valenzuela.

The street was extended north from Calle Santa Mesa (now Old Santa Mesa Road) to the new boulevard built during the U.S. colonial period called Santa Mesa Boulevard (now Magsaysay Boulevard). It was renamed in 1929 through Act No. 3581 after the second chief justice of the Supreme Court of the Philippines.

During World War II, its section between Valenzuela and P. Sanchez Streets was also known as, or part of, Pasig Boulevard (including Shaw Boulevard), which used to refer to the road or network of roads connecting Manila and Pasig, which was then the provincial capital of Rizal.
