= Cayetano Arellano =

Chief Justice of the Philippines from 1901 to 1920

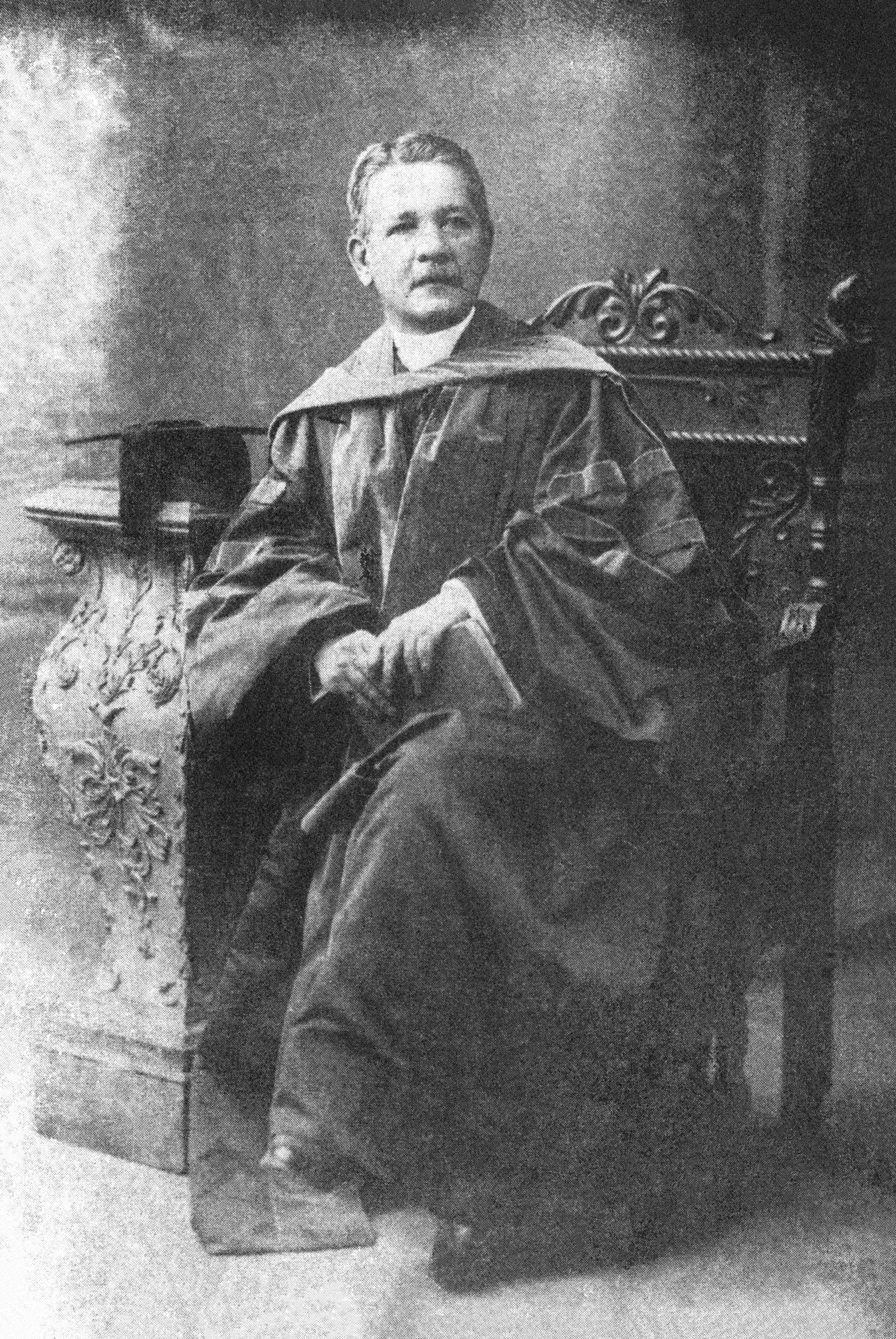
- Arellano in 1908

1st Chief Justice of the Philippines
- In office January 29, 1899 – April 12, 1920
- Appointed by: William McKinley
- Preceded by: Office established
- Succeeded by: Victorino Mapa

Personal details
- Born: Cayetano Simplicio Arellano y Lonzón; March 2, 1847 Udyong (now Orion), Bataan, Captaincy General of the Philippines
- Died: December 23, 1920 (aged 73) Manila, Insular Government of the Philippine Islands
- Resting place: La Loma Cemetery
- Spouse: Rosa Bernas
- Children: Asunción Arellano y Bernas
- Education: Colegio de San Juan de Letran; University of Santo Tomas (PhB, BTheol, LLB)

Cayetano Simplicio Arellano y Lonzón (March 2, 1847 – December 23, 1920) was a Filipino jurist who served as the first Chief Justice of the Philippines from 1899 to 1920.

== Early life ==
Cayetano Arellano was born to Servando Arellano and Cristy Lonzon. His father was a Spanish peninsular who came to the Philippines. He was educated at the Colegio de San Juan de Letran and the University of Santo Tomas, where he studied to become a priest. His studies for priesthood included philology, philosophy, theology, and civil and canon law.

At the age of 15, Arellano graduated with a Bachelor of Philosophy in 1862 and then with a Bachelor of Theology in 1867. However, he did not become a priest and instead entered the field of law. He graduated with a Bachelor of Laws in 1876.

== Career ==
Arellano worked as a lawyer and taught law at the University of Santo Tomas until 1898. From 1887 to 1889, he was a member of the Manila City Council. He was offered the position of Civil Governor of Manila, but declined the offer.

After the outbreak of the Philippine Revolution, Arellano was appointed as secretary of foreign affairs. However, he joined the United States government after the rebellion was defeated.

Governor-General William Howard Taft and Arellano worked to create a judicial system for the Philippines. The Real Audiencia was reorganised into the Supreme Court of the Philippines. On January 29, 1899, Arellano was appointed as chief justice of the court. The court had seven members, four Americans and three Filipinos, who were all paid $7,000 per year, with Arellano receiving $7,500. He served as chief justice until 1920.

Arellano was one of the founding members of the Federalista Party.

In G.R. No. 3621 (July 26, 1907 - United States v. Macario Sakay, et al.), the Supreme Court headed by Arellano affirmed the death sentence of Macario Sakay and his co-accused. Sakay was a hero of the Philippine Revolution, formally honored by a state-produced historical marker.

Arellano University was founded by Arellano. The University of the Philippines bestowed its first honorary degree to Arellano.

== Images ==
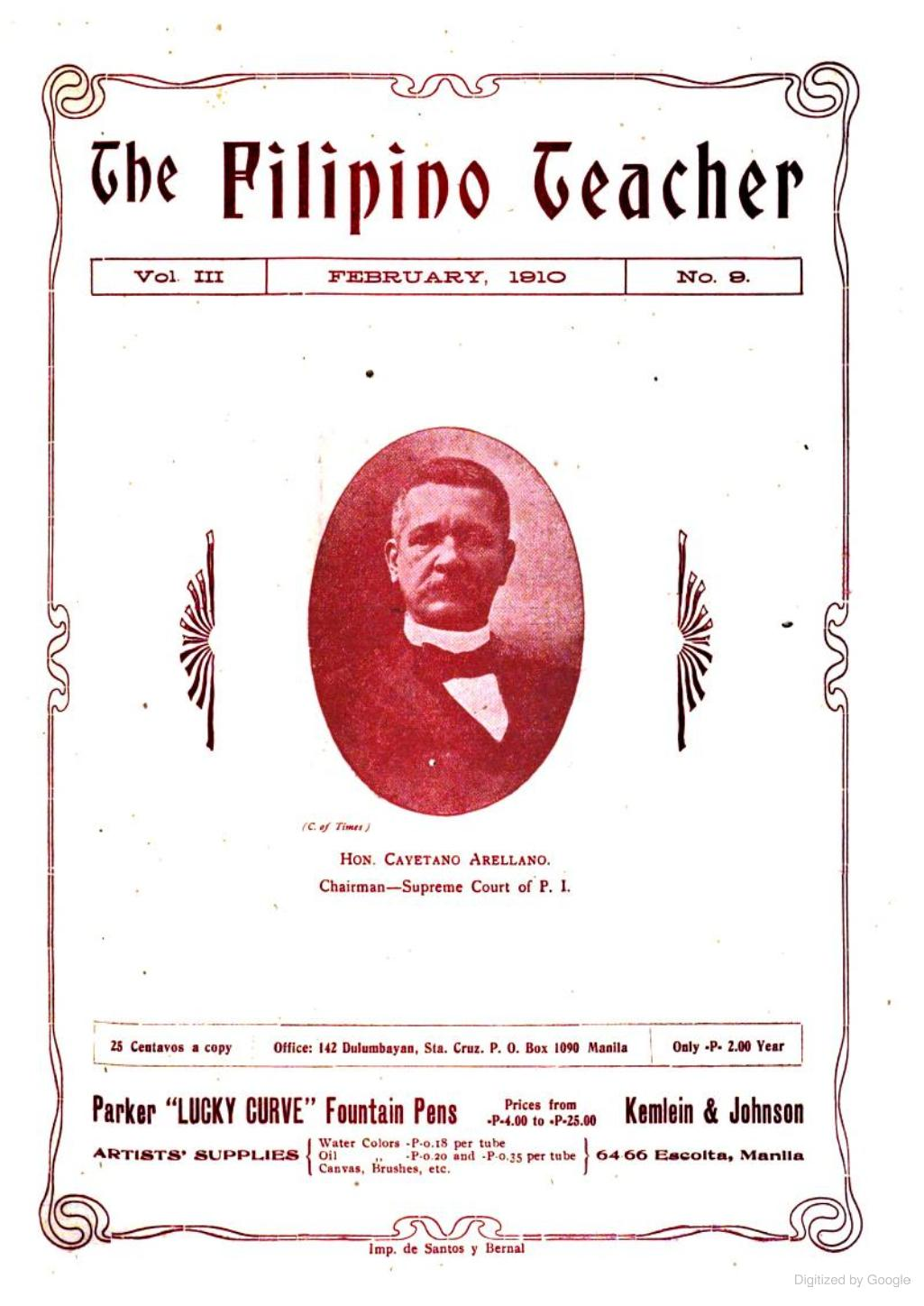
Arellano depicted in a 1910 publication of The Filipino Teacher

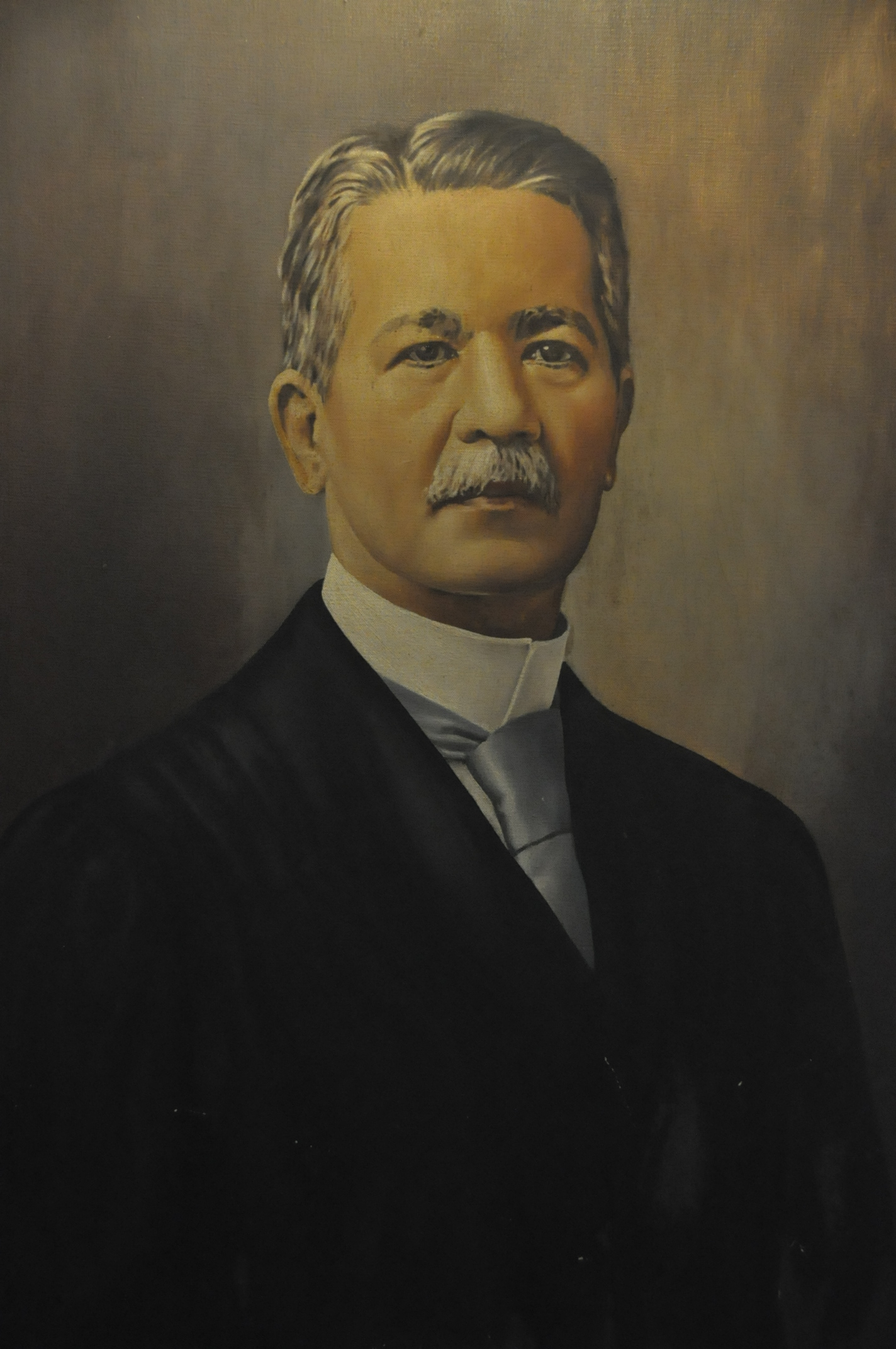
Portrait as Chief Justice

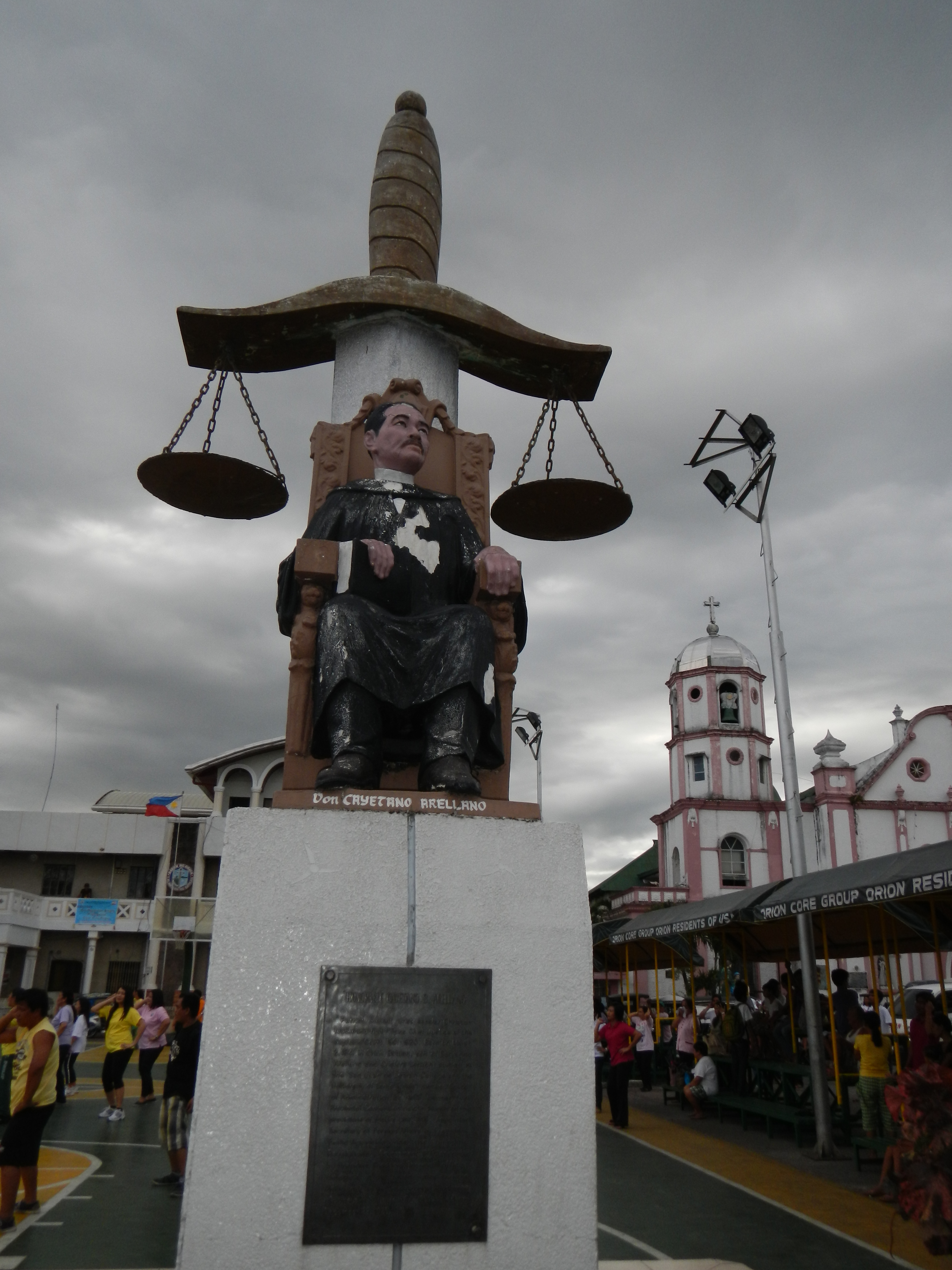
Monument of Cayetano Arellano in his hometown (Orion, Bataan)

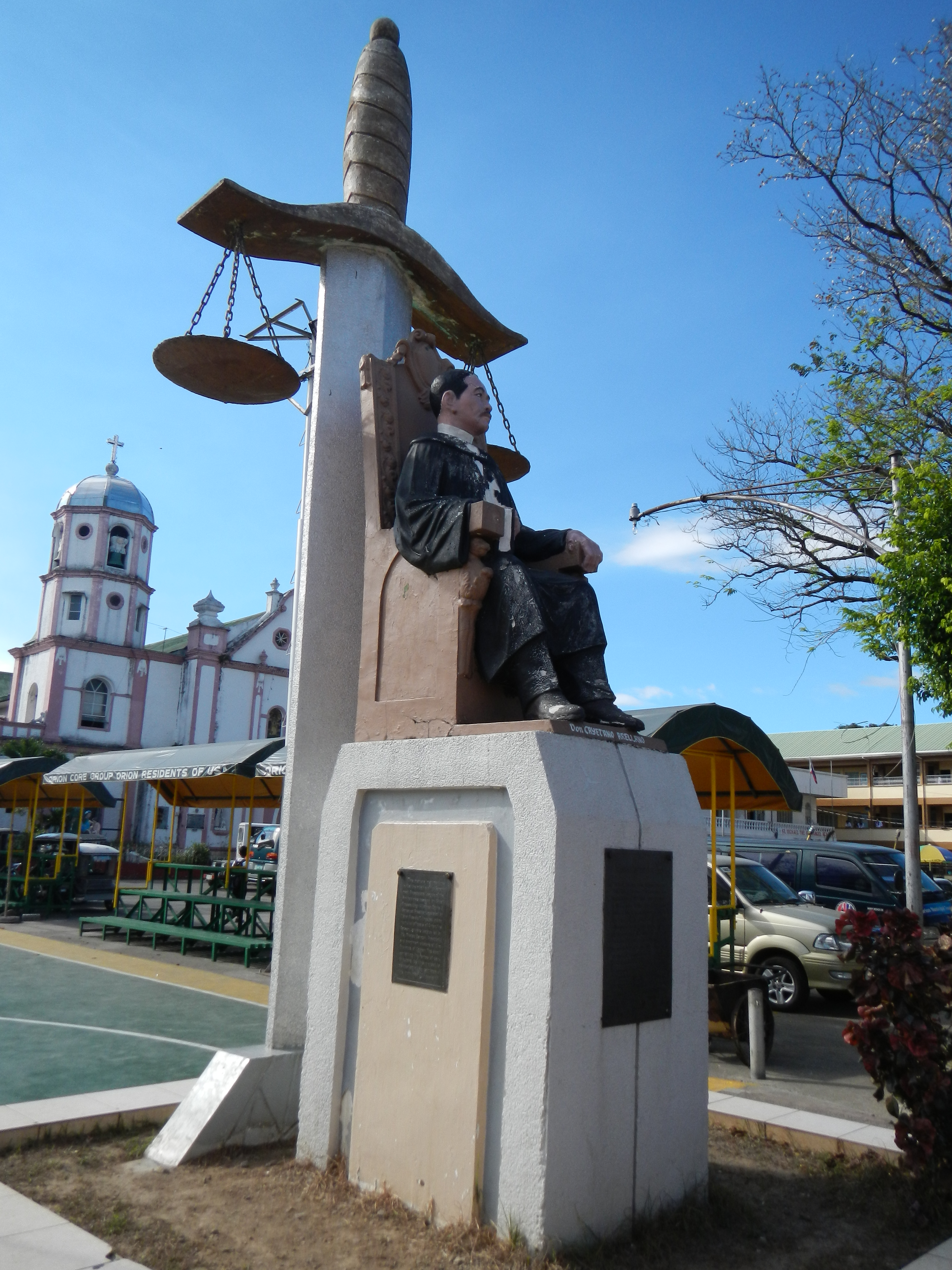
Side view

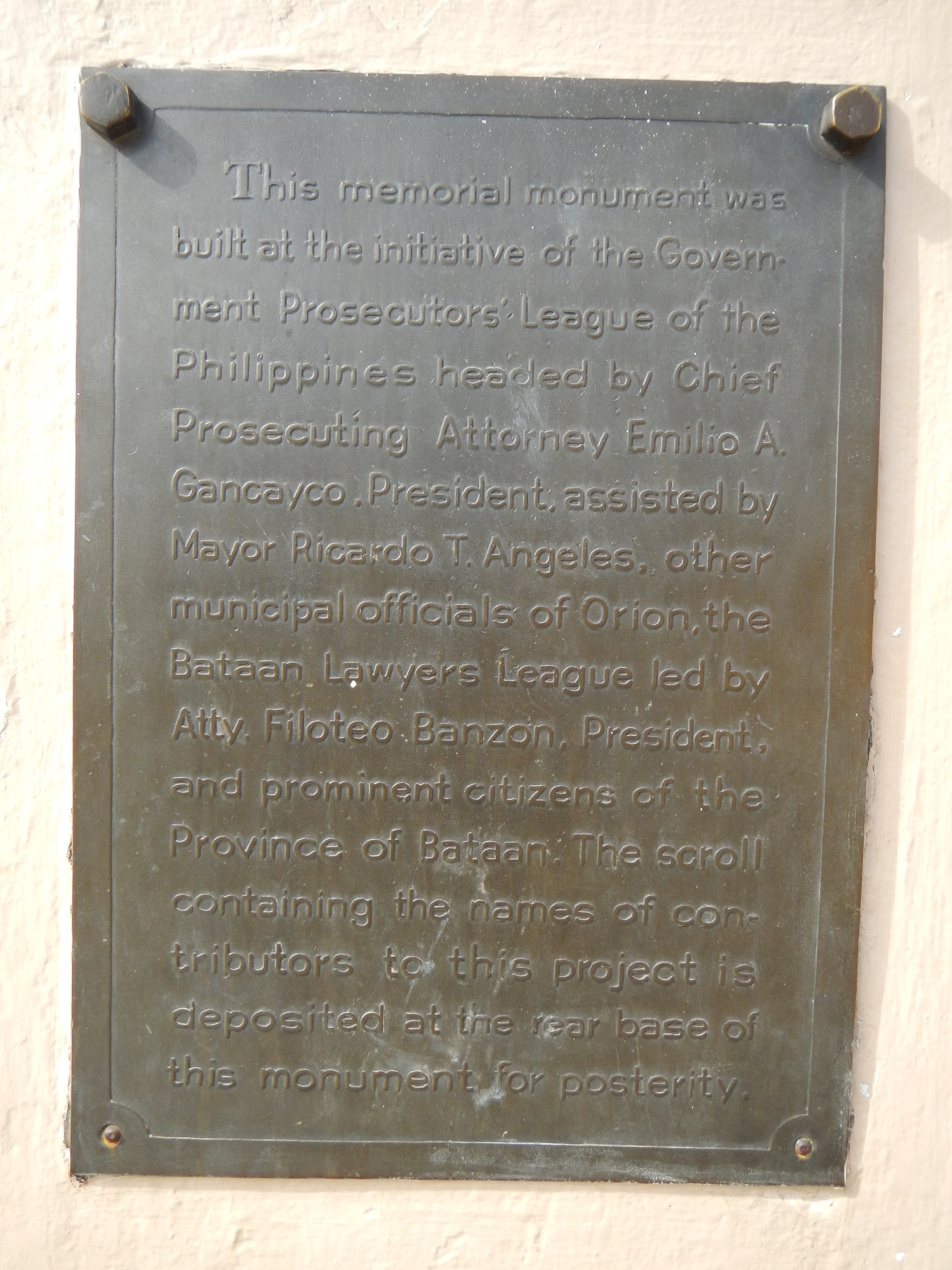
Marker

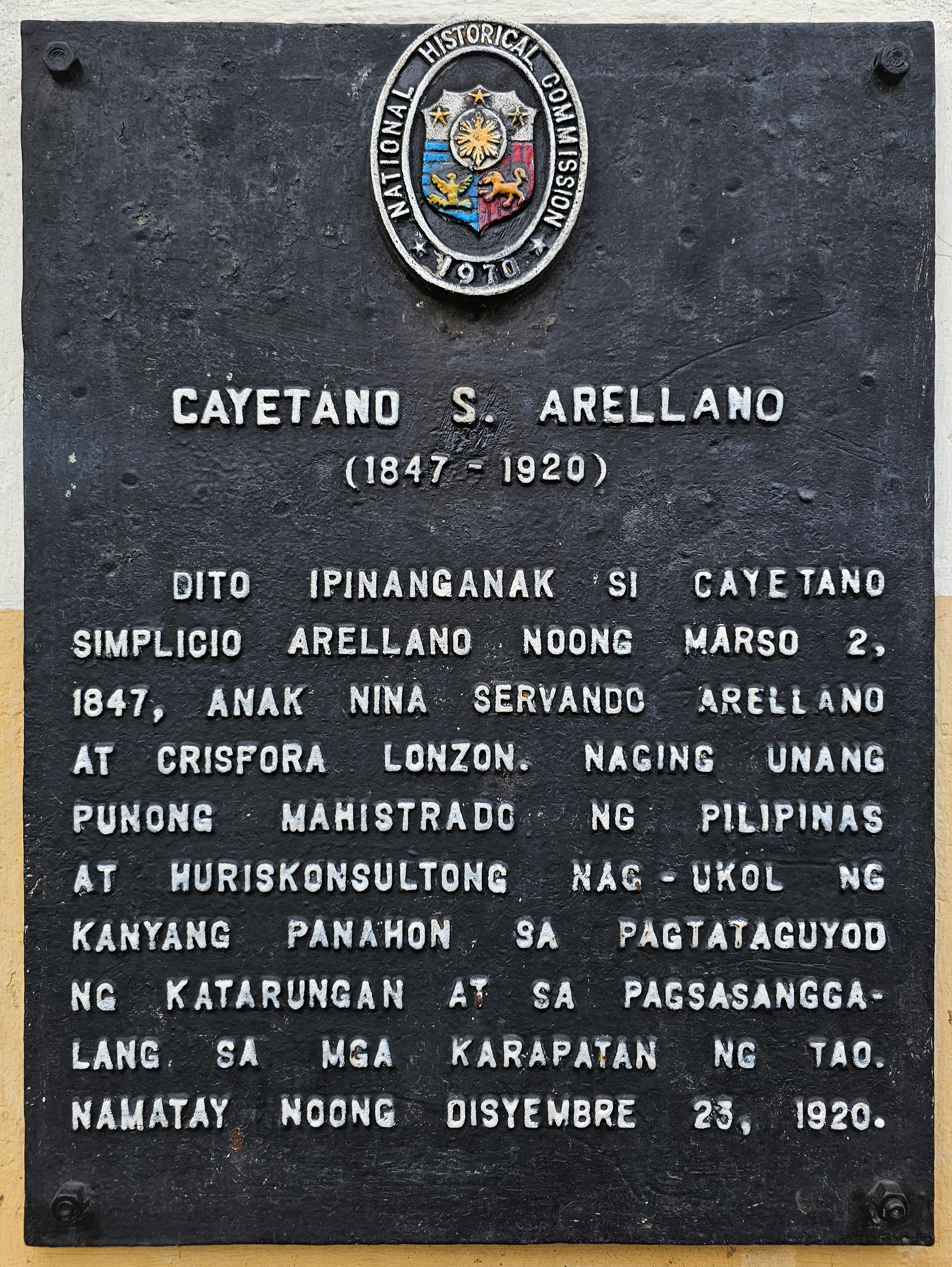
Historical marker installed in 1970 at the site of his birthplace.

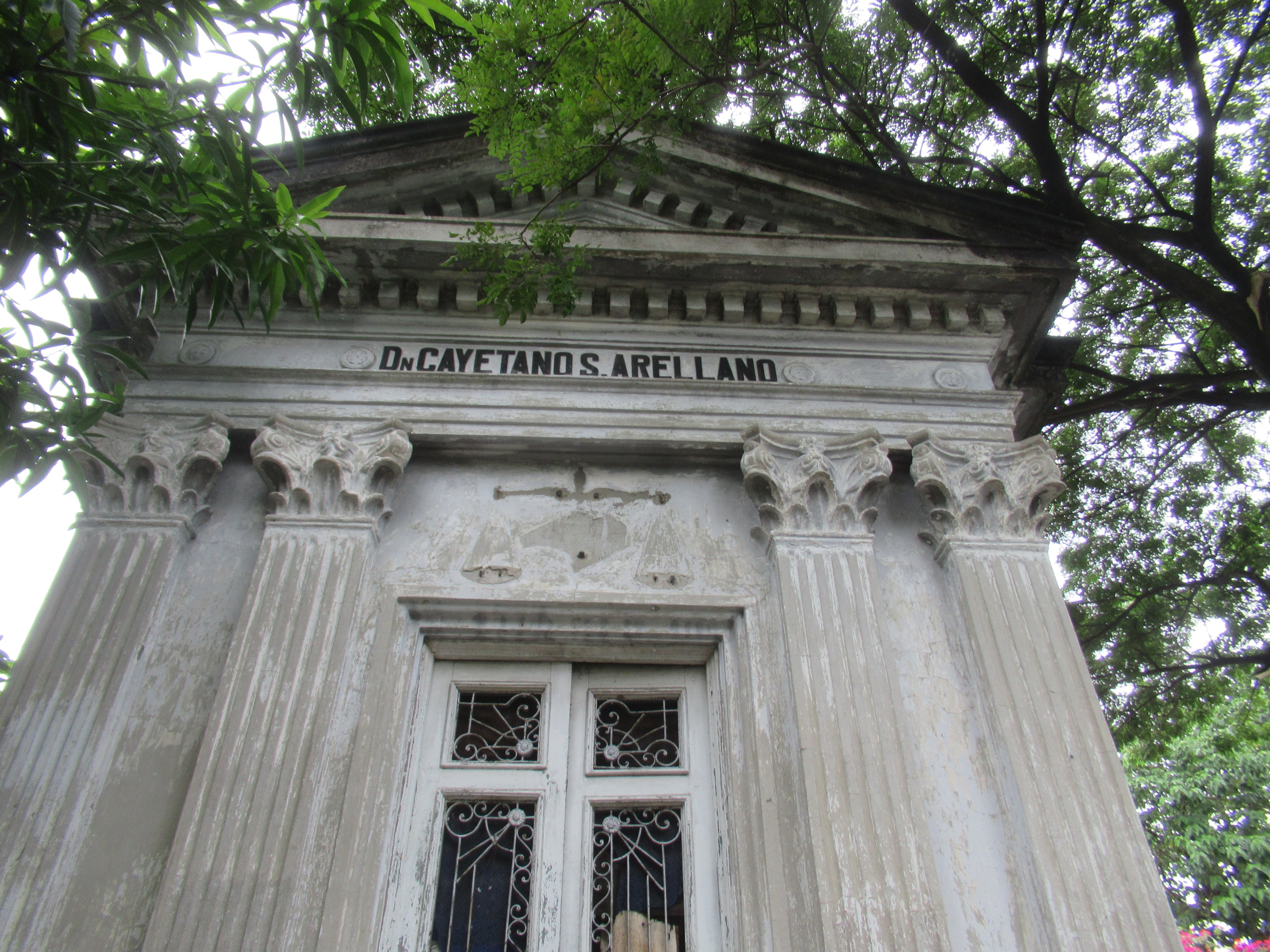
Mausoleum (La Loma Cemetery)

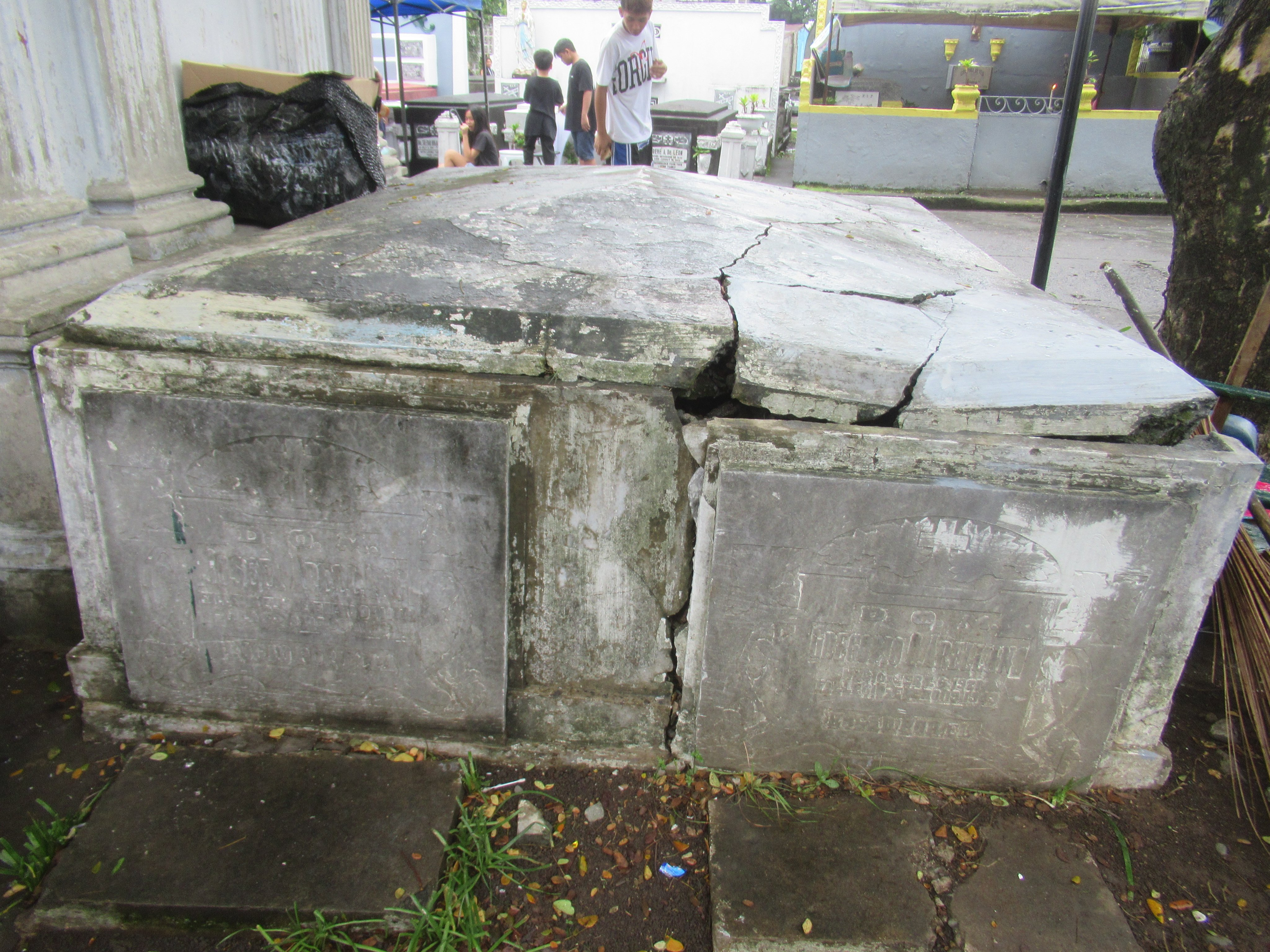
Tombs of Arellano's siblings

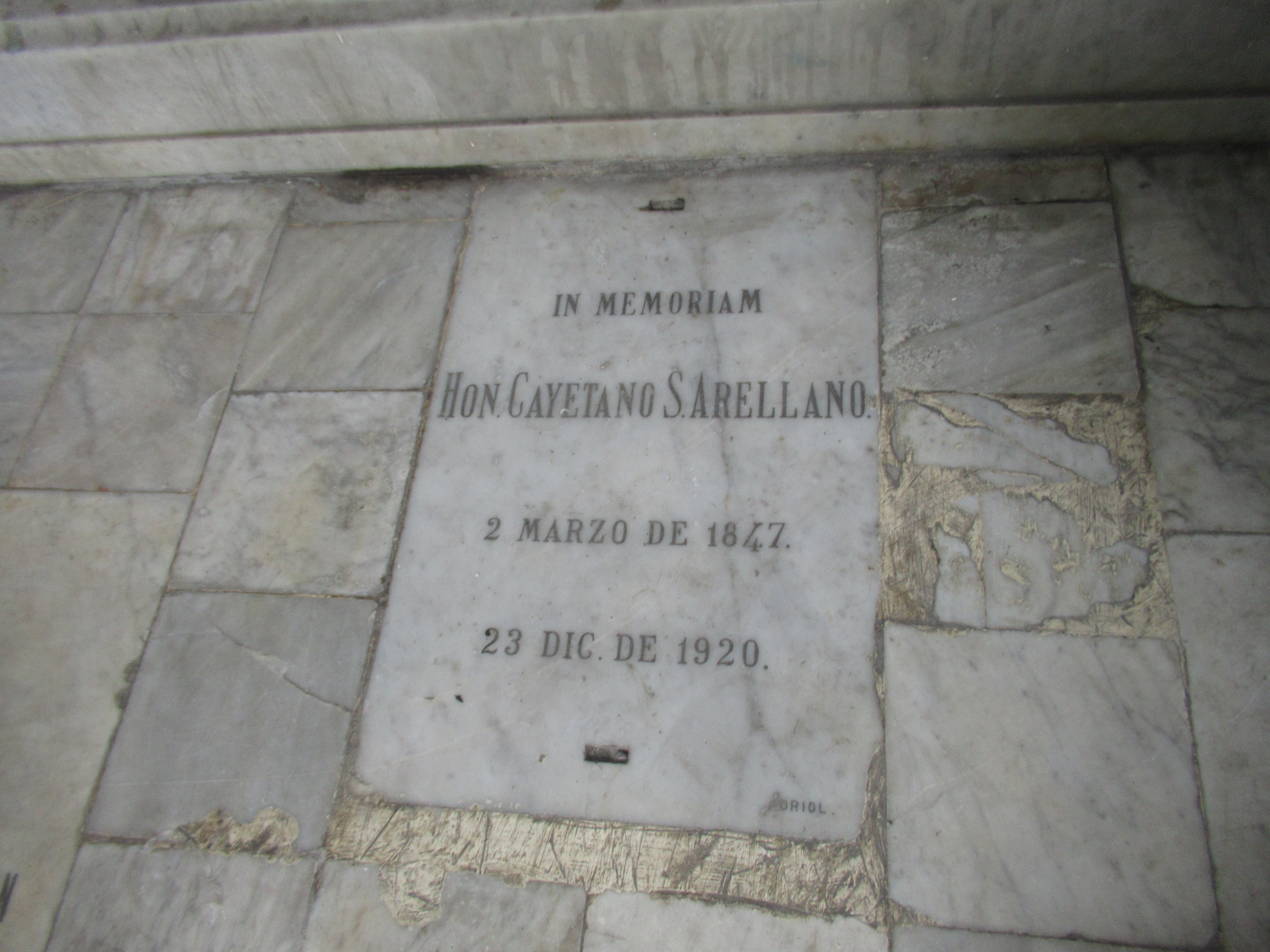
Tomb of Arellano

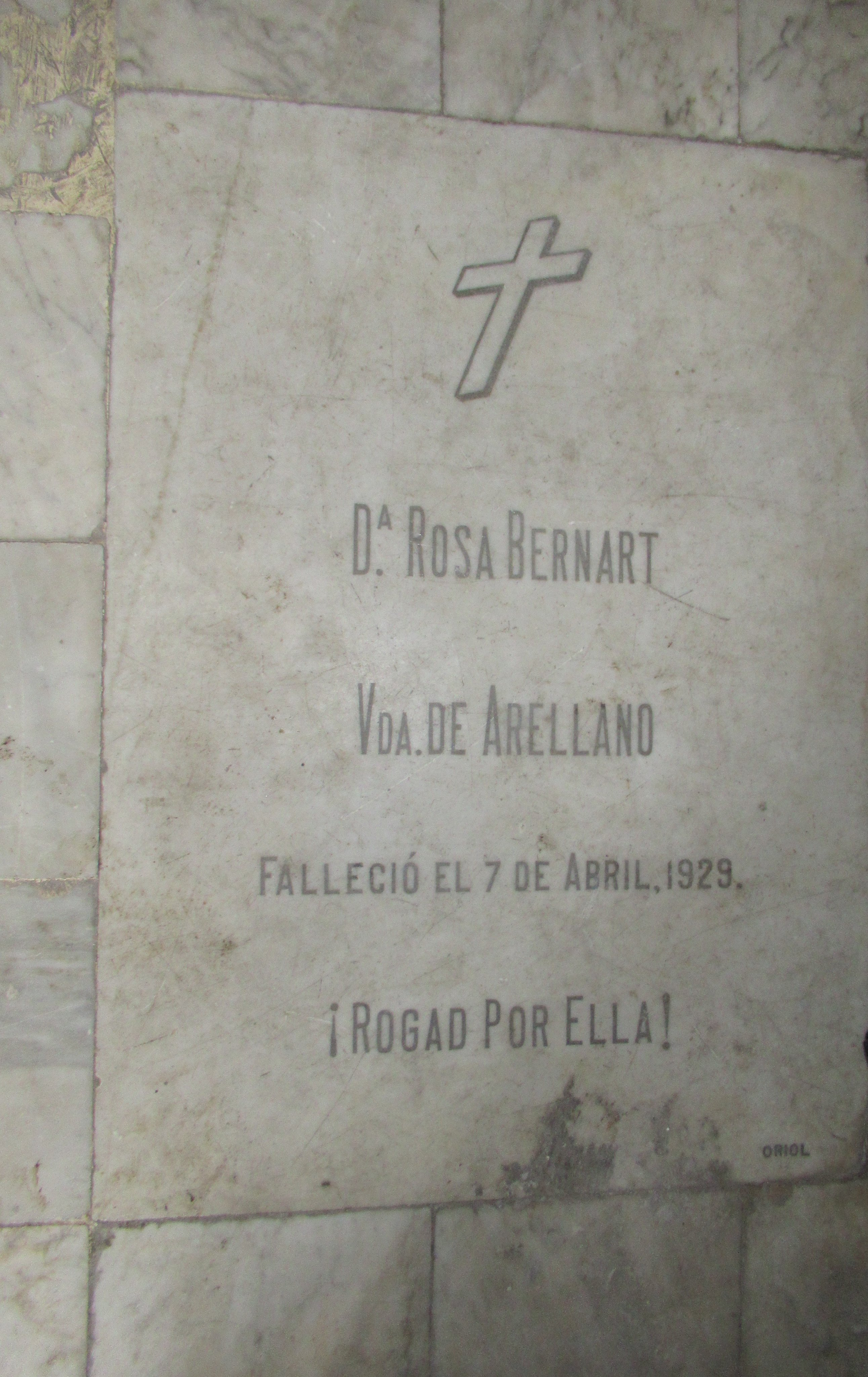
Tomb of wife Rosa Bernart

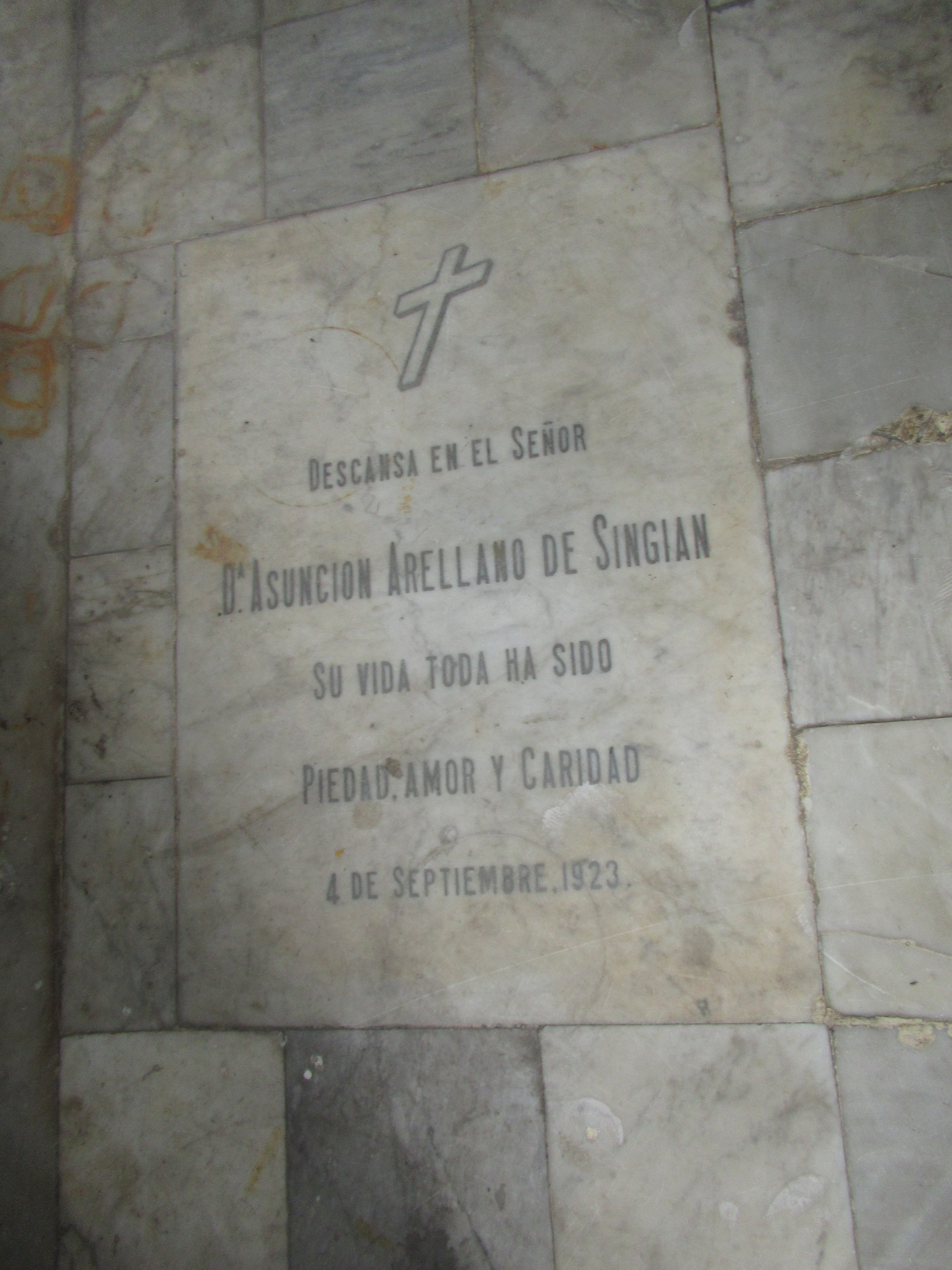
Tomb of Asuncion

== See also ==
- Arellano (Manila North) High School
- Arellano University

== Works cited ==
=== Books ===
- Hurd, Elizabeth; Sullivan, Winnifred, eds. (2021). At Home and Abroad: The Politics of American Religion. Columbia University Press. ISBN 9780231198981.
- May, Glenn (1991). Battle for Batangas: A Philippine Province at War. Yale University Press. ISBN 9780300242102.
- Winkelmann, Tessa (2022). Dangerous Intercourse: Gender and Interracial Relations in the American Colonial Philippines, 1898–1946. Cornell University Press. ISBN 9781501767074.

=== Journals ===
- Arcilla, Jose (1999). "Spanish Hostility to Friendship". Philippine Studies. 47 (4). Ateneo de Manila University: 532–549. doi:10.2307/42634341. JSTOR 42634341.
- Schumacher, John (1965). "258-286". Philippine Studies. 13 (2). Ateneo de Manila University: 258–286. doi:10.2307/42720595. JSTOR 42720595.
- Wilfley, Lebbeus (1904). "The New Philippine Judiciary". North American Review. 178 (570). University of Northern Iowa: 730–741. doi:10.2307/25119567. JSTOR 25119567.

=== Web ===
- "Cayetano Arellano". Arellano University. Archived from the original on 11 July 2025.

Legal offices
New office	Chief Justice of the Supreme Court of the Philippines; 1901–1920	Succeeded by Victorino Mapa
