= San Juan River (Metro Manila) =

Major tributary of the Pasig River

San Juan River San Francisco del Monte River
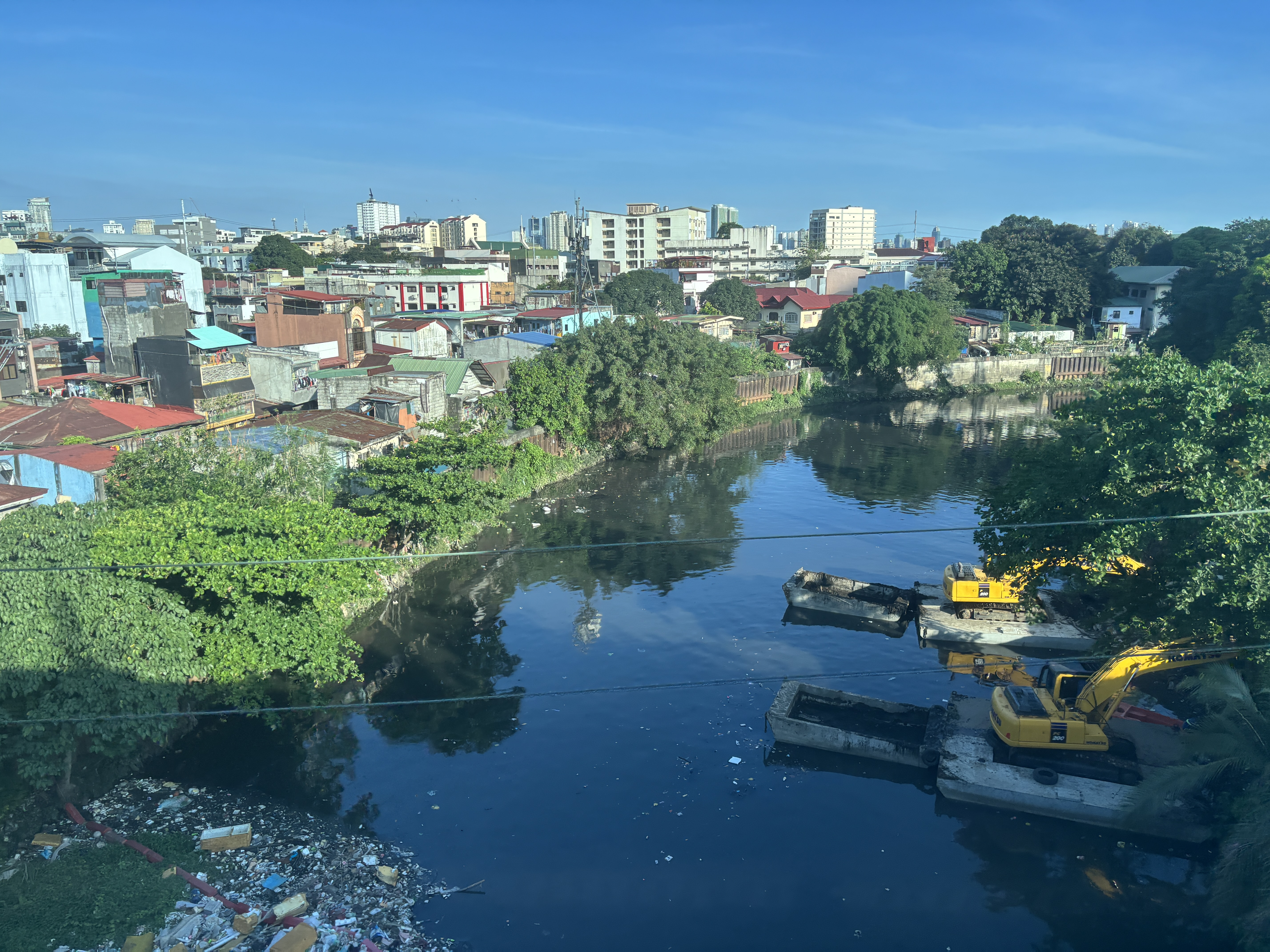
- The river in the Quezon City-San Juan border, 2025

- Location within Luzon Location within Philippines

Location
- Country: Philippines
- Region: National Capital Region
- Cities: Quezon City; San Juan; Manila; Mandaluyong

Physical characteristics
- Mouth: Pasig River
  - location: Brgy. 619, Manila
  - coordinates: 14°35′22″N 121°00′53″E
- Length: 22.2 km (13.8 mi)

Basin features
- Progression: San Juan–Pasig

The San Juan River (Filipino: Ilog San Juan) is one of the main river systems in Metro Manila, Philippines, and is a major tributary of the Pasig River. It begins near La Mesa Dam as the San Francisco del Monte River (Filipino: Ilog San Francisco del Monte), which officially takes the name San Juan River when it meets with Mariblo Creek in Quezon City. As the San Juan River, it passes through Quezon City, San Juan, the Manila district of Santa Mesa and Santa Ana, and Mandaluyong.

Right-of-way issues caused the realignment of the Santa Mesa portion of the Skyway Stage 3. Instead of passing through Old Santa Mesa Street, the expressway now follows the course of the San Juan River from Araneta Avenue to Pasig River.

== Tributaries ==
Aside from the San Francisco del Monte River, the San Juan River has five creeks as its main tributaries (starting from its mouth going upstream):

- Buhangin Creek in Mandaluyong is the tributary nearest to the river's confluence with the Pasig. Its mouth is in Barangay Población, Mandaluyong, near the end of Bonifacio Avenue where it meets New Panaderos Street. Its traceable headwaters are somewhere in Barangay Zañiga.
- Maytunas Creek in San Juan has its mouth near Sevilla Bridge at the end of Shaw Boulevard, Barangay Daáng Bakal. Its traceable headwaters are somewhere near the National Center for Mental Health in Mandaluyong.
- Salapán Creek (also Ermitaño Creek) in San Juan is the third main tributary of the San Juan River. Its mouth is located in Barangay Salapán, San Juan near Aurora Boulevard, and crosses Wilson Street near Barasoain Street in Barangay Greenhills, San Juan. Its known sources are near Club Filipino and inside the Wack Wack Golf and Country Club, both in San Juan; and in Barangay Bagong Lipunan Crame, Quezon City.
- Dilimán Creek in Quezon City is the fourth main tributary. It joins the San Juan River in Barangay Kalusugan near E. Rodríguez, Sr. Avenue behind St Luke's Medical Center. Its traceable headwaters are in Quezon City. The southernmost branch can be traced to Barangay Santolan near Blue Ridge Subdivision, with the northernmost in Barangay Pansól near the UP Integrated School. An intermediate branch springs from within the Ateneo de Manila University campus, while a fourth branch, known as Victoria Creek, passes by Anonas Avenue and is notable for defining the boundary of Project 2 and 3, before finally ending in Barangay Duyan Duyan in Project 3.
- Mariblo Creek (also spelt Mariablo; sometimes called Talayan Creek and Tanque Creek) in Quezon City is the fifth main tributary. Mariblo Creek joins the San Francisco River to form the San Juan River in Barangay Mariblo, near Quezon Avenue. Its traceable headwaters are in Barangay Bungad near the corner of West Avenue and EDSA; at the opposite end of West Avenue, near the Welcome Rotonda roundabout where West Avenue meets Quezon and Timog avenues; and in the Ninoy Aquino Parks & Wildlife Center.

=== As the San Francisco del Monte River ===
Upstream from the confluence with the Mariblo, the river is known as the San Francisco del Monte River. This river in turn divides upstream into Dario Creek and the Pasong Tamó River.

Culiát Creek, whose headwaters are within the UP Diliman campus, empties into the Pasong Tamó River.

== Bridges ==
The official portion of the river has 9 bridges which are nearly and exactly located at the borders of Quezon City, San Juan, Mandaluyong and Manila. The LRT Line 2 is the only rail bridge that crosses the river.

Quezon City

- Quezon Avenue Bridge (Barangays Talayan, Tatalon and Roxas District)
- Kaliraya Bridge - carrying Kaliraya Road (Barangays Roxas District and Tatalon)
- Marilao Bridge - carrying E. Rodriguez Sr. Avenue (Barangays Tatalon, Kalusugan and Doña Imelda)

Quezon City-San Juan

- Lambingan Bridge - carrying Aurora Boulevard (Barangays Doña Imelda and Balong Bato)
- LRT Line 2 (Barangays Doña Imelda and Balong Bato)
- San Juan-Santa Mesa Bridge - carrying Araneta Avenue (Barangays Doña Imelda and Progreso)

San Juan-Manila

- San Juan River Bridge - connecting N. Domingo Street and Old Sta. Mesa Street (Barangay Progreso and District of Santa Mesa)

Manila-Mandaluyong

- Sevilla Bridge - connecting P. Sanchez Street and Shaw Boulevard (District of Sta. Mesa and Barangay Daang Bakal)

Manila

- Lubiran Bridge - connecting Lubiran Street and Rev. Aglipay Street (District of Sta. Mesa)

The 2 future rail bridges of Metro Rail Transit (MRT) crossing the San Juan River are MRT-4 parallel with Sevilla Bridge located at Manila-Mandaluyong Boundary and MRT-8 located along Quezon Avenue in Quezon City. A simple suspension pedestrian bridge was the last crossing of the river before it met the Pasig River, but was demolished because of the construction of the Skyway Stage 3.

== See also ==
- List of rivers and estuaries in Metro Manila
- Pasig river rehabilitation
