= N180 highway =

Highway in the Philippines

Route 180

Route information
- Maintained by the Department of Public Works and Highways
- Length: 9 km (5.6 mi)
- Existed: 2014–present

Major junctions
- East end: AH 26 (N1) / N59 (EDSA) in Cubao, Quezon City
- N184 (Gilmore Avenue) in Quezon City; N130 (G. Araneta Avenue) in Quezon City; N183 (V. Mapa Street) in Santa Mesa, Manila; E2 (NLEX Connector) in Santa Mesa, Manila; N140 (Lacson Avenue / Nagtahan Street) at Nagtahan Interchange, Manila; N145 (Recto Avenue) in Quiapo & Sampaloc, Manila; N182 (Romualdez Street) in Ermita, Manila; N181 (San Marcelino Street) in Ermita, Manila; N170 (Taft Avenue) in Ermita, Manila
- West end: N150 (Padre Burgos Avenue) in Ermita, Manila

Location
- Country: Philippines
- Major cities: Manila, Quezon City

Highway system
- Roads in the Philippines; Highways; Expressways; List
← N175	→ N181

National Route 180 (N180) is a secondary national route that forms part of the Philippine highway network. It runs from Cubao, Quezon City to Ermita, Manila.

== Route description ==
N180 follows a route that starts at Cubao in Quezon City, which then passes through the district of New Manila in Quezon City, the city of San Juan, Quezon City once again, and the districts of Santa Mesa, Sampaloc, Quiapo, San Miguel, and Ermita in Manila. The highway connects key locations on its route and runs through the heart of Manila. The highway continues westward as Padre Burgos Avenue (N180) and eastward as a continuation of Aurora Boulevard (N59). The highway's section from EDSA in Quezon City to Recto Avenue/Mendiola Street in Manila forms part of Radial Road 6 (R-6), while the rest of the route up to Taft Avenue forms part of Circumferential Road 1 (C-1).

The LRT Line 2 runs on top of the route, utilizing the center island on most segments.

=== Aurora Boulevard ===
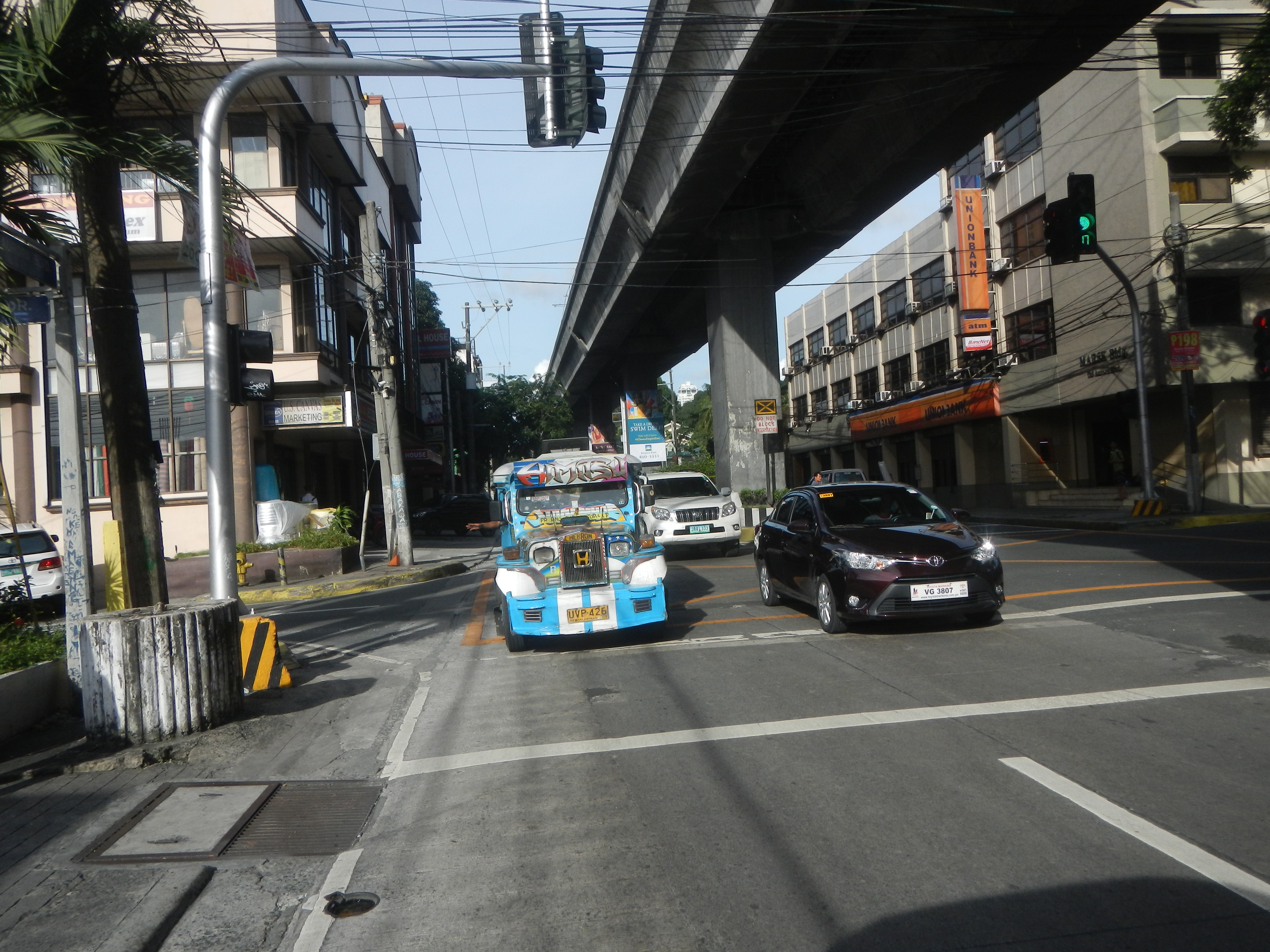
N180 as Aurora Boulevard

Starting in Cubao, N180 follows Aurora Boulevard, which runs on a four-lane highway primarily in New Manila, passing through intersections such as Betty Go-Belmonte Street and Gilmore Avenue (N184). It then briefly crosses to San Juan, crossing through major crossings such as J. Ruiz Street before terminating at its intersection with G. Araneta Avenue (N130), wherein it continues westward after the intersection as Magsaysay Boulevard (N180). LRT Line 2 runs on the center island throughout this segment.

=== Magsaysay Boulevard ===
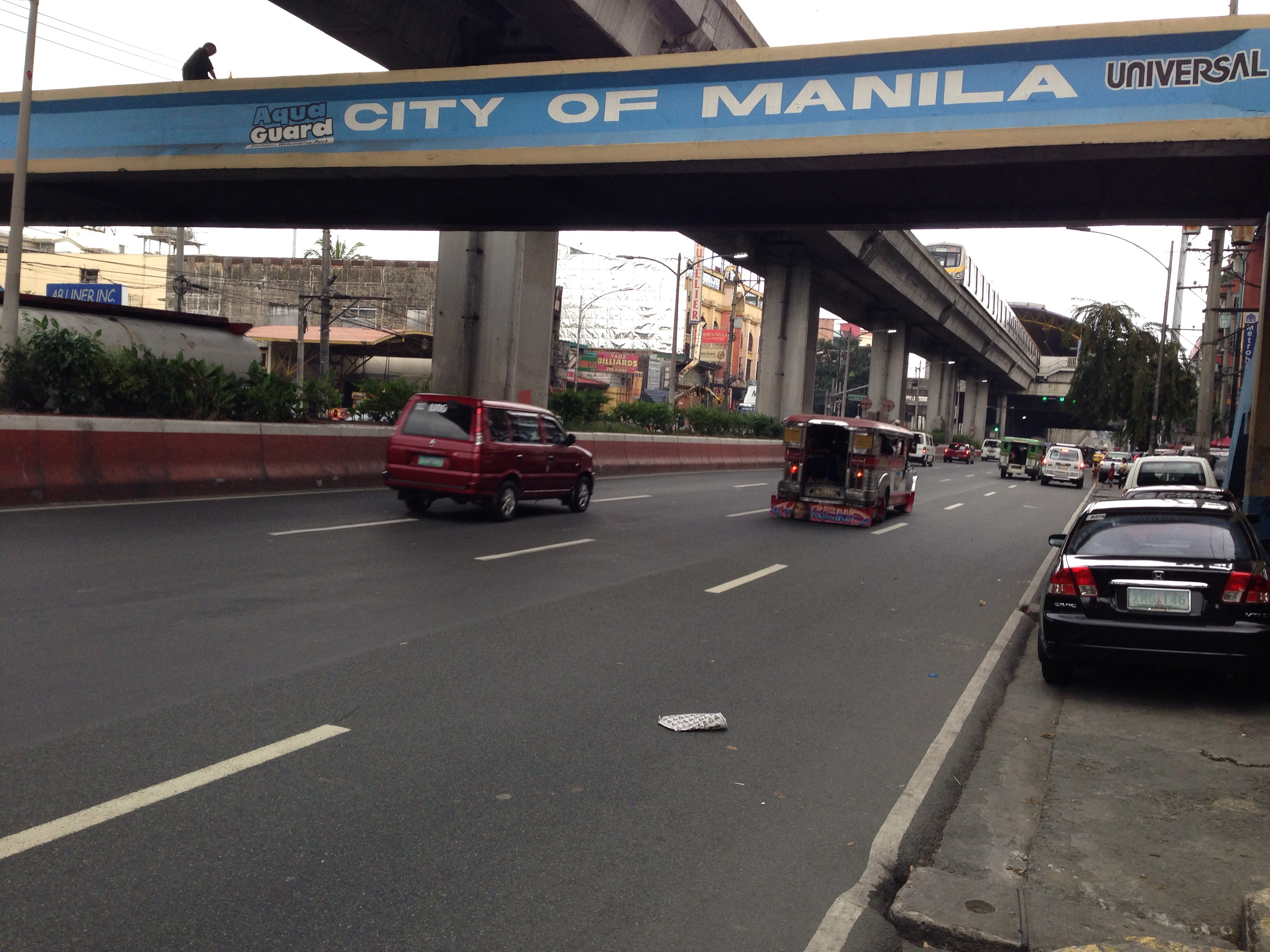
N180 as Magsaysay Boulevard

As it enters Santa Mesa and Sampaloc, Manila, N180 becomes Magsaysay Boulevard, which runs on an eight-lane highway passing through intersections such as Victorino Mapa Street (N141) and Pureza Street before it terminates at Lacson Avenue and Nagtahan Street (N140) at the Nagtahan Interchange. It then terminates at the Magsaysay Boulevard-Legarda Street Flyover at the interchange, continuing westward as Legarda Street (N180). LRT Line 2 runs on the center island almost through the entire segment.

=== Legarda Street ===
As it crosses the Nagtahan Interchange, Legarda Street takes over the N180 designation, which runs as a four-lane road passing through intersections such as Earnshaw Street and Recto Avenue (N145) before it terminates at Nepomuceno Street (N180), which briefly takes over the route. LRT Line 2 runs on the center island from Lacson Avenue to Earnshaw Street, after which it deviates by turning towards Recto Avenue westward.

=== Nepomuceno Street ===
N180 briefly becomes Nepomuceno Street until its junction with P. Casal Street, which takes over the route.

=== P. Casal Street ===
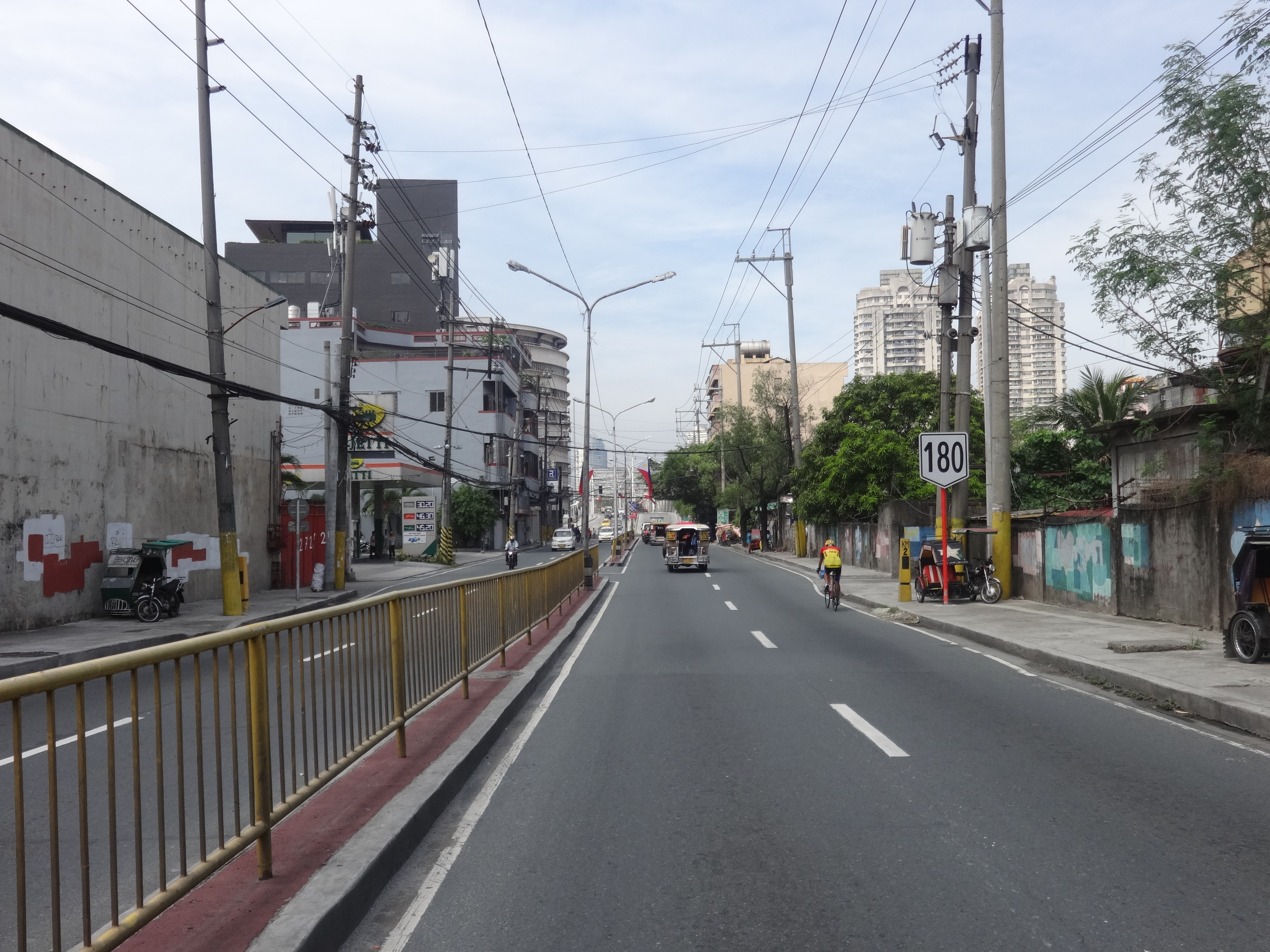
N180 as P. Casal Street

From its intersection at Nepomuceno Street, P. Casal Street takes over the N180 designation until it crosses the Pasig River as the Ayala Bridge.

=== Ayala Boulevard ===
Ayala Boulevard takes over N180 from Ayala Bridge to Taft Avenue (N170).

=== Finance Road ===
Finance Road is the last short segment of N180, starting from the Taft Avenue (N170) intersection until its western end at Padre Burgos Avenue (N150), where it merges towards Manila Bay.
