= Gregorio Araneta Avenue =

Suburban arterial road in Quezon City, Metro Manila, Philippines

Coordinates: 14°36′54″N 121°1′0″E

C-3

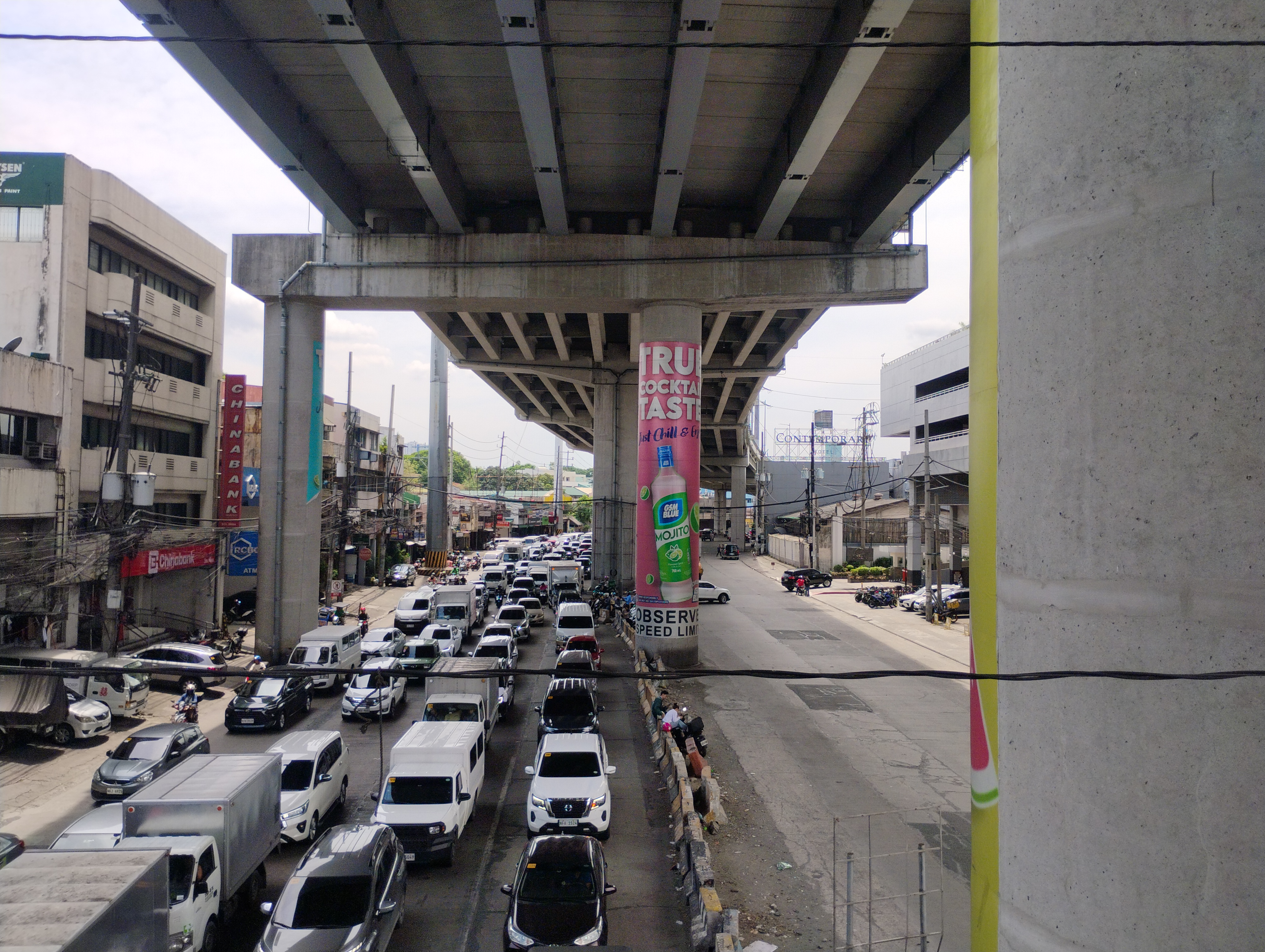
- Gregorio Araneta Avenue beneath the Skyway in July 2026
- Interactive map of Gregorio Araneta Avenue
- Namesake: Gregorio S. Araneta
- Maintained by: Department of Public Works and Highways
- Length: 5.3 km (3.3 mi)
- Component highways: C-3 C-3; N130 north of Magsaysay/Aurora Boulevard
- Location: Quezon City and San Juan
- North end: Santo Domingo Avenue in Quezon City
- Major junctions: N170 (Quezon Avenue) in Quezon City; N180 (Magsaysay Boulevard / Aurora Boulevard) in Quezon City
- South end: N. Domingo Street in San Juan

Construction
- Completion: 1985

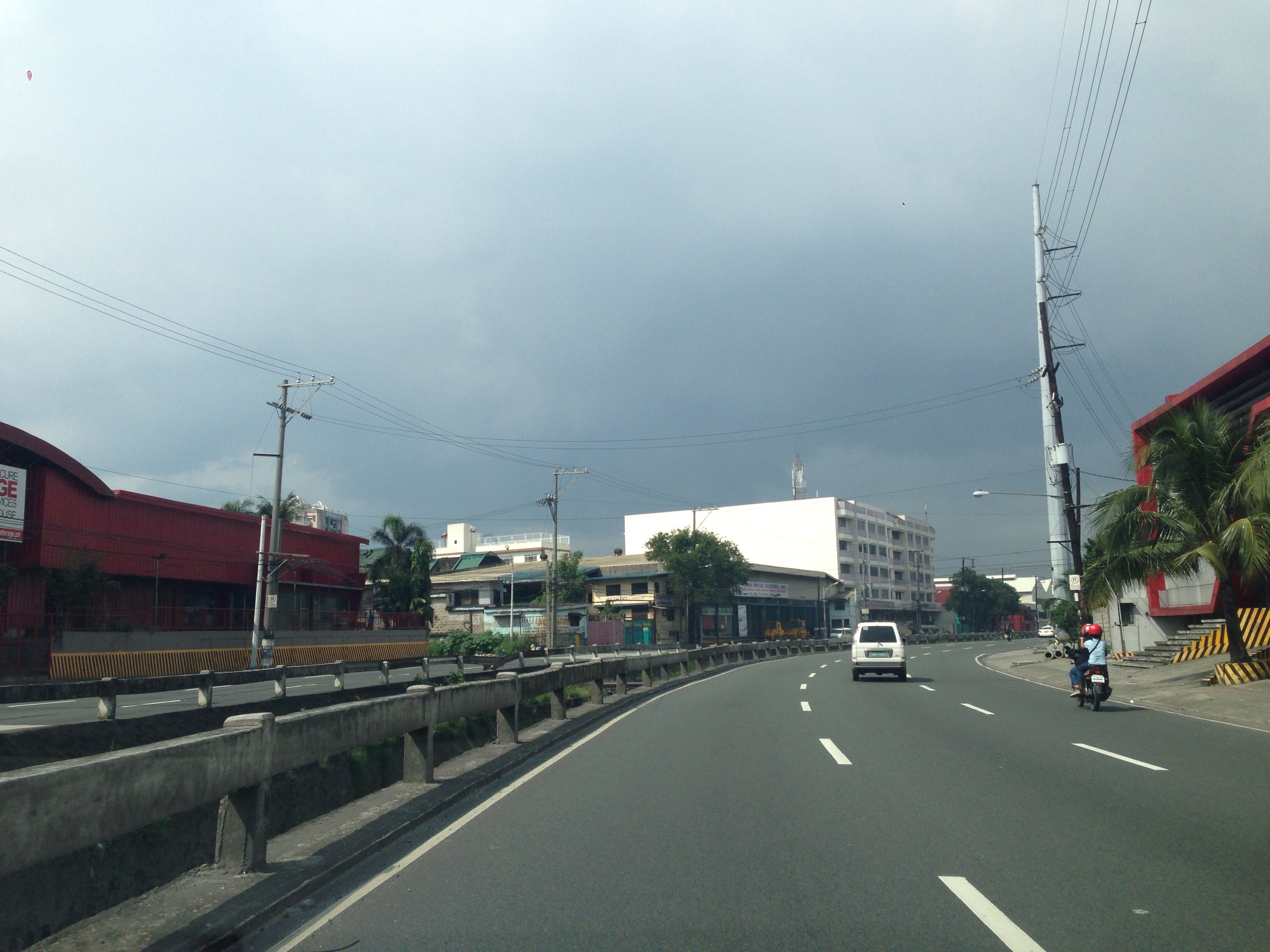
Gregorio Araneta Avenue near the Calamba Street intersection, before the construction of Skyway Stage 3

Gregorio Araneta Avenue is a suburban arterial road in the Santa Mesa Heights area of Quezon City, northeastern Metro Manila, Philippines. Constructed in 1985, it is a six-to-eight-lane divided avenue designated as part of Circumferential Road 3 (C-3) and a physical continuation of Sergeant Rivera Street, which travels from Santo Domingo Avenue at its north end near Balintawak in Quezon City and meets N. Domingo Street in the south in San Juan near the border with Santa Mesa, Manila. En route, it intersects with Del Monte Avenue, Quezon Avenue, Eulogio Rodriguez Sr. Avenue and Magsaysay-Aurora Boulevard, passing through barangays Balingasa, Manresa, Masambong, Sienna, Santo Domingo, Talayan, Tatalon, Santol, and Doña Imelda in Quezon City and Progreso in San Juan.

The avenue lies in a flood-prone zone near San Francisco del Monte and the San Juan River. It was named after lawyer and landowner Gregorio S. Araneta, who owned the Santa Mesa Heights Subdivision on which it was built.

Between Del Monte Avenue and Quezon Avenue, Gregorio Araneta Avenue runs alongside Talayan Creek, serving as the waterway median of the avenue. As a result of the Skyway Stage 3 project, parts of the waterway median were converted into a closed culvert for access to and from the Skyway.

The Metro Manila Skyway Stage 3 covers almost the entire road, starting from Sergeant Rivera Avenue and ending at the San Juan River.

== Funeral row ==
Gregorio Araneta Avenue is best known as the location of some of the biggest funeral parlors in the metropolis. These are the Arlington Memorial Chapels, La Funeraria Paz, Ascension Columbary, Cosmopolitan, Nacional Memorial Homes, and the Sanctuarium (formerly Capitol Memorial). The oldest is Funeraria Nacional, which moved to Gregorio Araneta from its old address in downtown Avenida Rizal in 1968 and is now affiliated with Heritage Park after an extensive renovation. It was followed by La Funeraria Paz in the 1970s and Arlington, which converted the old Thomas Jefferson Library on the avenue into a funeral facility in 1985.

== Automated Trash Rake ==
In 2014, the Department of Science and Technology built an automated garbage rake at the intersection of Araneta Avenue and Mauban Street, functioning as a river cleaning facility, in response to the perennial flooding and garbage problems in the area. Garbage trucks regularly collected garbage captured from the river and those dumped nearby. It is currently under repairs and refurbishment.

== Intersections ==
Province	City/Municipality	km	mi	Destinations	Notes
Quezon City		9	5.6	Sto. Domingo Avenue	Northern terminus. Continues west as N130 (Sergeant Rivera Avenue)
Balingasa Creek					
Quezon City				Valentin Ventura Street	Northbound only
Quezon City				Mauban Street	
Quezon City				Wayan Street	Northbound access for pedestrians only. Fenced off entry.
Quezon City				G. Roxas Street	Southbound only
Quezon City				Northern terminus of Talayan Creek median section	
Quezon City		8.5	5.3	Del Monte Avenue	Traffic light intersection. Access to Siena College, San Francisco del Monte district, and A. Bonifacio Avenue.
Quezon City		8	5.0	Norberto S. Amoranto Sr. (Retiro) Avenue	Traffic light intersection. Access to La Loma district and the districts of Sampaloc and Santa Cruz in Manila.
Quezon City				Calamba Street	Opposite segments accessible through nearby roads.
Quezon City				Skyway	Skyway-Maria Clara off-ramp. Northbound entrance.
Quezon City				Skyway	Skyway-Quezon Avenue Exit. Southbound entrance.
Quezon City				Maria Clara Street	Traffic light intersection. Access to La Loma district and the districts of Sampaloc and Santa Cruz in Manila.
Quezon City				Southern terminus of Talayan Creek median section	
Quezon City				Skyway	Skyway-Quezon Avenue Exit. Northbound exit.
Quezon City				P. Florentino Street	Opposite segments accessible through nearby roads.
Quezon City		7	4.3	N170 (Quezon Avenue)	Traffic light intersection. Quezon Avenue-Araneta Avenue Underpass.
Quezon City				Agno Street Extension	Opposite segments accessible through nearby roads.
Quezon City				ROTC Hunters Street	Northbound only
Quezon City				Skyway	Skyway-Quezon Avenue Exit. Southbound exit and northbound entrance.
Quezon City				Kaliraya Road	Unsignaled intersection
Quezon City				Victory Avenue	Unsignaled intersection
Quezon City				Kitanlad Street	Southbound only
Quezon City		7	4.3	E. Rodriguez Sr. Avenue	Traffic light intersection, No left turns and no U-turns; U-Turn slot located ahead.
Quezon City				Kapiligan Street	Northbound only
Quezon City				Skyway	Skyway-G. Araneta (formerly E. Rodriguez) off-ramp. Southbound entrance.
Quezon City				Tomas Arguelles Street	Southbound only
Quezon City				Bayani Street	Traffic light intersection
Quezon City				Baloy Street	Unsignaled intersection
Quezon City		9	5.6	Landargun Street	Unsignaled intersection
Quezon City				Tamar Street	Southbound only. Fenced-off entry.
Quezon City				Skyway	Skyway-G. Araneta on-ramp. Northbound exit.
Quezon City				Palanza Street	Traffic light intersection
Quezon City		6	3.7	N180 (Magsaysay Boulevard/Aurora Boulevard)	Southern terminus of N130; change to unnumbered route.
Quezon City–San Juan boundary				San Juan-Santa Mesa Bridge over San Juan River	
San Juan		6	3.7	Skyway	Skyway-Aurora Boulevard on-ramp. Future northbound exit
San Juan				N. Domingo Street	Southern terminus. Access to Santa Mesa in Manila, New Manila and Cubao in Quezon City, and Kalentong in Mandaluyong.
1.000 mi = 1.609 km; 1.000 km = 0.621 mi: Closed/former; Incomplete access; Route transition; Unopened
