= Hotel Sogo =

Hotel chain in the Philippines

- Product type: Hotel chain
- Current owner: Global Comfort Group Corporation
- Country: Philippines
- Introduced: 1992
- Markets: Philippines
- Tagline: So clean... So good!
- Website: www.hotelsogo.com

Hotel Sogo (ホテル ソウゴ, Hoteru Sougo) is a hotel chain in the Philippines managed and owned by the Global Comfort Group Corporation, which also owns the Icon Hotel and Eurotel hotel chains. Currently, the hotel group has 34 hotels over Metro Manila and 14 in 11 other provinces. The hotel generally display a lodging with a Japanese theme.

== History ==
Hotel Sogo was established by two individuals in 1992. One was a hotel professional who was involved in the hotel industry for 20 years and the other was a commercial developer and a contractor with an "AAA" license. The word "Sogo" was included as part of the hotel's chain name which mean "harmony" and adopted a Japanese theme. In the Philippines, the hotel brand brought many innovation to the hospitality industry by introducing free wifi, giving skateboards to the floor personnel, and launching a 24/7 call center.

In 2016, Hotel Sogo launched the hoverboard-based service. The waiters of the hotel chain are using the self-balancing two-wheel electrical motorized boards, locally known as hoverboard for F&B drive-in services. In February 2019, Hotel Sogo launched a new, simpler design throughout its branded locations.

== Branches ==
As of May 2026, the Global Comfort Group Corporation (GCGC) manages 52 Hotel Sogo branches in the country, with 35 in Metro Manila and 17 provincial branches.
