= Traffic in Metro Manila =

Traffic congestion in Metro Manila is a major urban challenge in the Philippines, affecting economic productivity, public health, and quality of life. Metro Manila, officially known as the National Capital Region (NCR), is home to over 24 million people and ranks among the most congested metropolitan areas globally.

== Overview ==
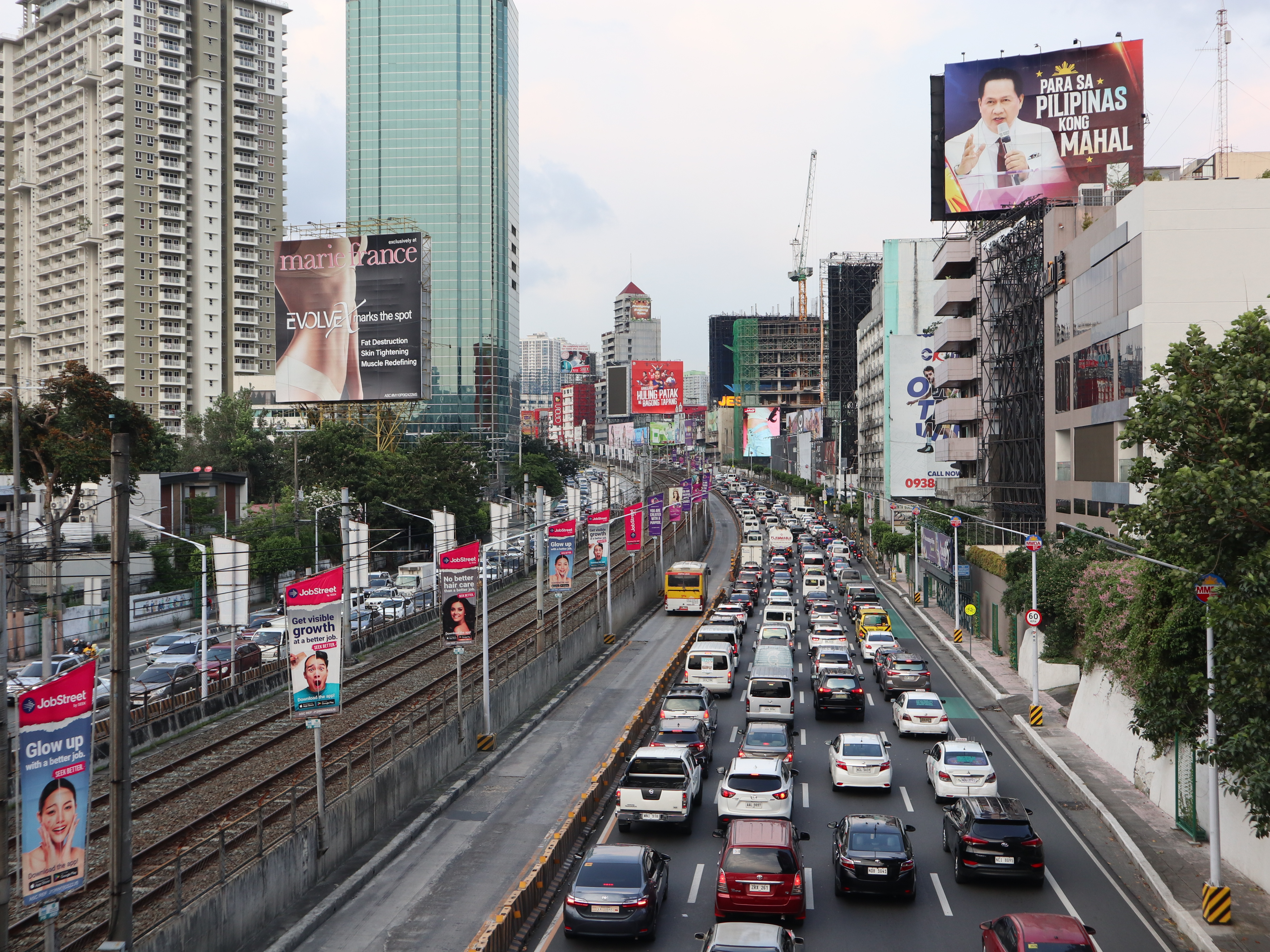
Traffic jam on EDSA

According to a "Global Driver Satisfaction" survey conducted by the navigation app Waze in 2015, Metro Manila had the "worst traffic on Southeast Asia". Emerson Carlos, MMDA assistant general manager for operation has mentioned that in 2015, motor vehicle registrations in Metro Manila peaked at around 2.5 million. TomTom ranked Manila as the 40th worst in the world in 2025, topped by Mexico City and Bogota, Colombia in bad traffic quality for cities. Meanwhile, for urban regions, the only Philippine urban region to surpass Metro Manila was Davao City, with both landing just outside the top 10.

== Causes ==
=== Infrastructure problems ===
One of the primary causes of traffic density within Metro Manila is the current transportation infrastructure. Overall, there is a lack of quality infrastructure thus insufficient modes of mobility.

The Duterte administration has promised that the coming years will be the "golden age of infrastructure", with a record $168 billion to be spent on 5,000 projects across the nation”.

==== Road network ====
The road network of Metro Manila consists of radial (R-1 to R-10) and circumferential (C-1 to C-5) roads. These are the principal arteries within the city, however given the density of vehicles within the metropolis the roads have become inadequate. "Metro Manila only has 1 km of road per 424 vehicles."

Furthermore, the roads are of poor quality and do not receive maintenance. For example, in the scope of the entire country, "Of the 31,400 km of national roads in the system, only about 45% (14,200 km) were assessed as being in good or fair condition in November 2011.”

==== The railway system ====
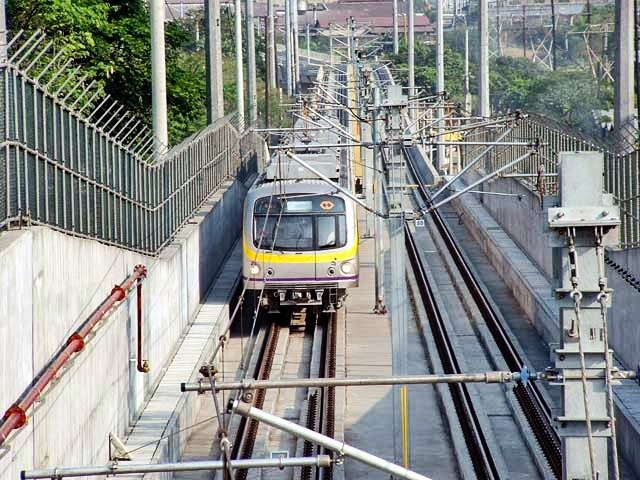
LRT Line 2

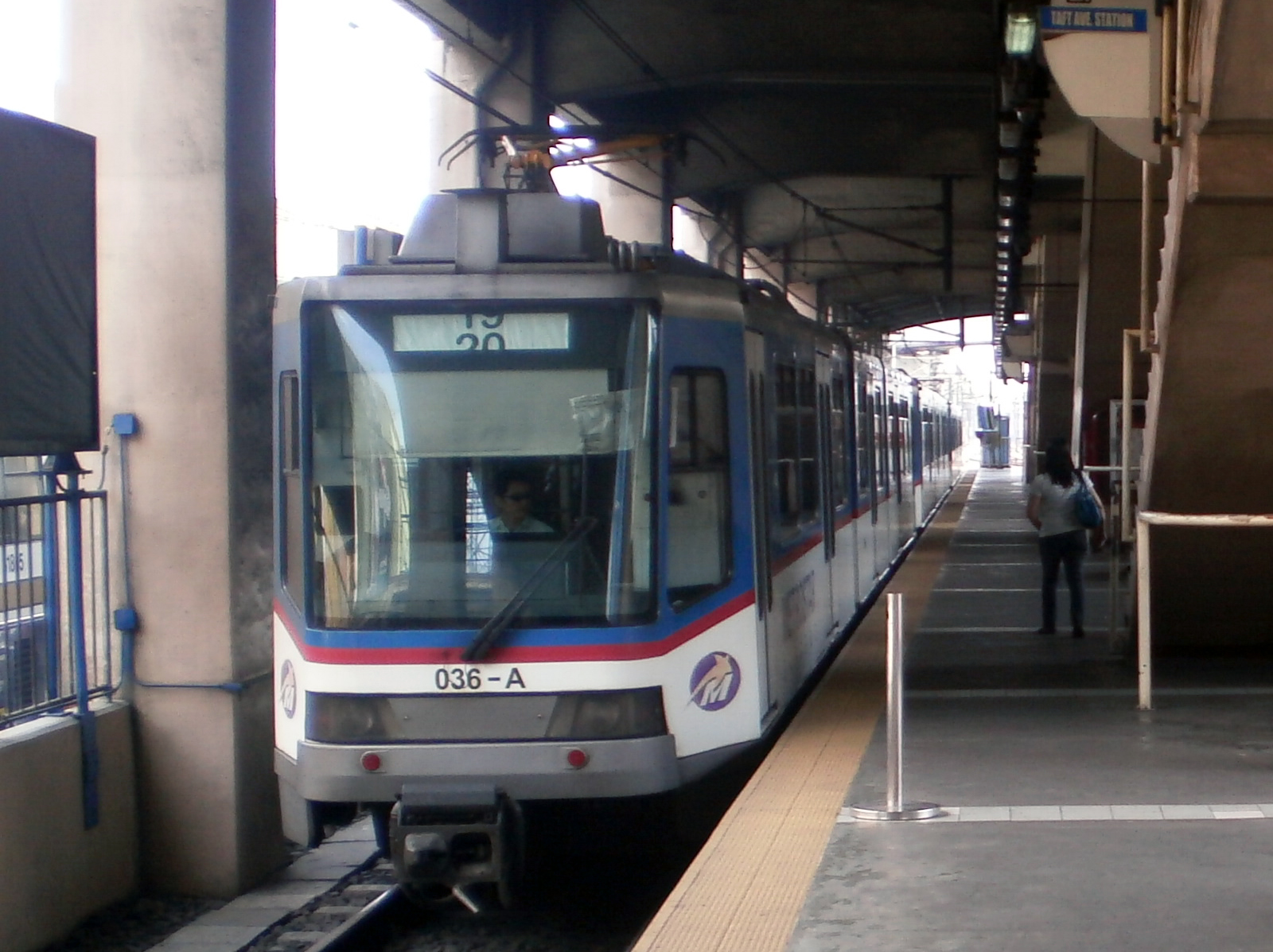
MRT Line 3

The current railways carry around 1.3 million passengers per day and spans 79 km (49 mi) in 4 different lines. In 1998, plans for a railway expansion were implemented however only 5 km (3.1 mi) of the planned 73 km (45 mi) was actually built. As such, there exists a lack of an adequate non-road-based public transportation system. This is made evident with the problem of overcrowding during peak hours, which is at 4:00pm to 5:00 pm.

==== Road-based Public Transport ====
In Metro Manila, a variety of road-based public transport, such as tricycles, taxis, buses, and jeepneys which are all privately owned "account for more than 50% of daily commuting trips, incur no subsidy, and with low productivity.” Meanwhile, "car travel accounts for 30% of person-km, but constitutes 72% of the road traffic in terms of PCU-km.” The high number of vehicles on the road, which could be attributed to the high population, is one of the contributors to traffic congestion.

=== Urban planning problems ===
According to renowned urban planner Felino Palafox Jr., Metro Manila used to be an example of good urban planning until the mid-1970s. Palafox cited gated communities within central business districts, and the decision of local government units within the metropolitan area to "throw away" the Metro Manila Zoning Ordinance in the 1990s, as contributors to Metro Manila's urban planning "mess".

==== Urban area expansion ====
The urban area of Metro Manila has experienced a high growth rate in population. In 2000–2001, the city experienced a rate of 1.8%, resulting from the spillover of people from nearby towns, cities, and provinces. The urban planning of the city is not adequate for the high population density. Statistics show that the city must "accommodate about an additional two million to six million by 2030.”

==== Traffic congestion ====
Today, traffic demand is at 12.8 million trips in Metro Manila. Most of these trips are made using the public transport owing to its 69% share of total trips. The lesser share of the trips is done by private mode and yet it is this mode that takes up 78% of road space. At the current state, the traffic already exceeds the capacity of existing roads.

=== Economic theories ===
The Roadmap for Transport Infrastructure for Metro Manila and its Surrounding Areas (Region III & Region IV-A) study by the Japan International Cooperation Agency (JICA) in response to the National Economic Development (NEDA) request for assistance in creating a guide for transport development in Metro Manila, the two regions of Central Luzon and CALABARZON. The guide was made to help NEDA deliberate on the contents of a short-term (2014 - 2016) and a medium term (2017 - 2022) transport investment program (TRIP).

For the short-term transport investment program (TRIP), it takes the goals of the Philippine Development Plan for 2011 to 2016 and makes it into projects in the transport sector. It has invested as much as 5% of the GDP in infrastructure as one of the five key strategies to achieving the TRIP. A huge difference from the previous investing rate, which was as low as 2% of the GDP.

Same study has also found that during their research period, the Metro Manila traffic was costing the city and the people Php 2.4 billion per day in the year 2012 which increased to Php3 billion in 2015. And, if no measures are undertaken, this transport cost can rise up to Php 6.0 billion per day in 2030. This is will be worst-case scenario in the increase of transport costs in Metro Manila and the areas of Bulacan, Rizal, Laguna, and Cavite if there will be no improvements done on the transport infrastructure of these areas and the Philippines overall.

=== High population ===
In Busina: Current State, Alternatives and Emerging Filipino Values on Metro Manila Traffic, Metro Manila is classified as a global power city. This is because of majority of the industries present in the Philippines have located their offices in the National Capital Region (NCR). The city is also where all the foreign consulates and embassies are situated. This makes NCR the home of finance and commerce, hence the allure of in-migration from Filipinos from the provinces. Although this is not the main cause of road traffic in the city, the influx of people adds to it.

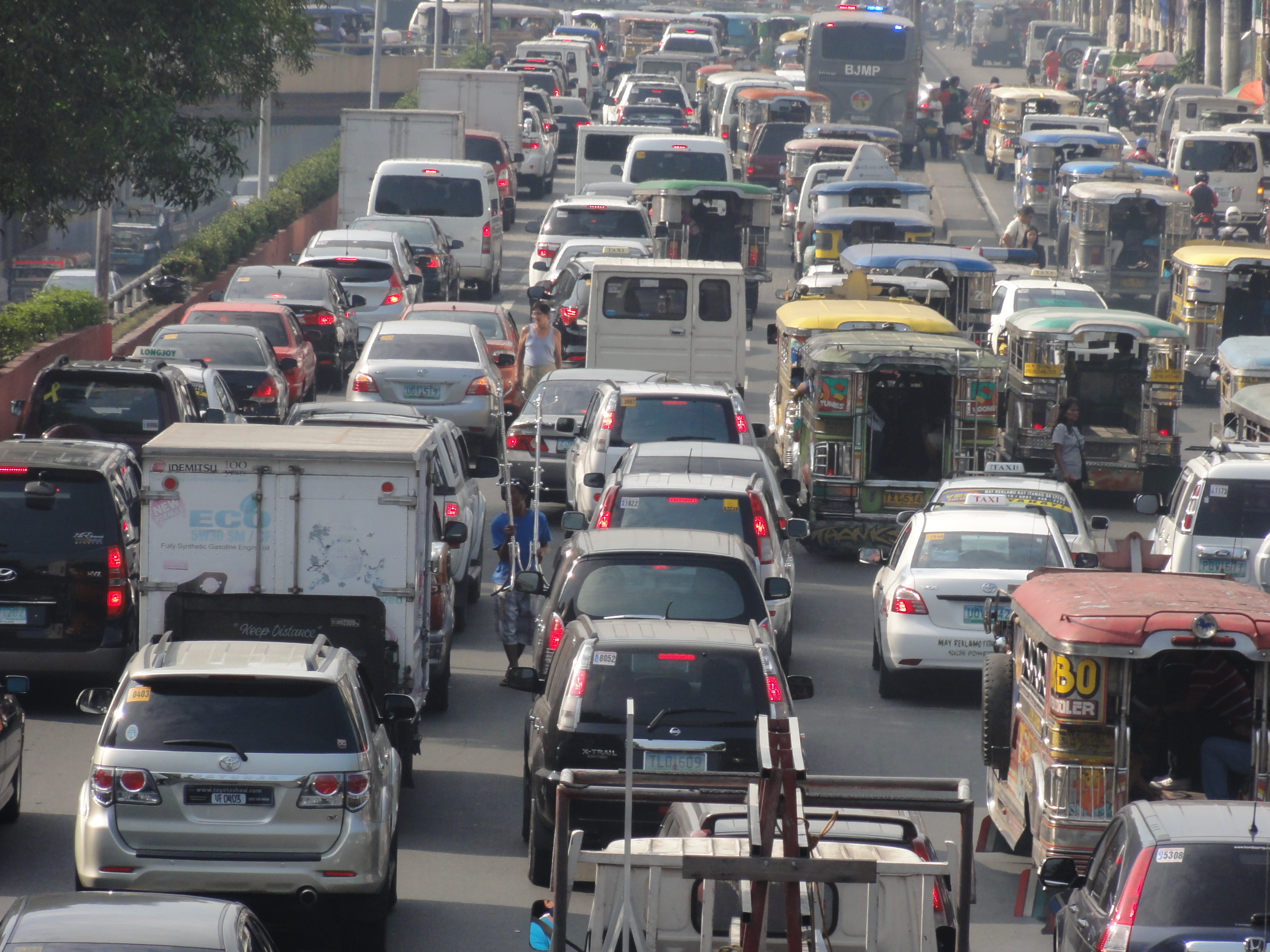
Heavy traffic congestion along A. Mendoza Street (formerly Calle Andalucía) in Manila

Yves Boquet, in his paper Battling Congestion in Manila: The EDSA Problem, quotes Robert Cervero in saying globalization, outsourcing and relocating much of the manufacturing activities are just some of the other causes that add to the high population in Metro Manila. These activities are mainly responsible for the influx that was previously mentioned. These activities are creating the job that appeal to people in the province to make the move.

=== Growing car ownership ===
Another cause of heavy traffic in the cities is the increase of the purchasing power of most people in Metro Manila. According to Euromonitor's Consumer Lifestyles in the Philippines (2015), young professionals in the Metro tend to buy small cars such as Toyota Wigo, Mitsubishi Mirage, and Honda Jazz that adds to road congestion. This is due to the affordability of the said cars, which gives them reason not to use public transport.

Referring back to the study that dubs EDSA as the main passageway of the Greater Manila area, the city accounts for 35.7% of the Philippines’ economic output, 18% of its population and 28% of its motor vehicles. All of which are accommodated on barely 0.2% of the country's land area.

According to the study of MMDA, in EDSA alone, there are 247,527 private 4-wheel vehicles that ply every day. It has the highest number compared to motorcycles, taxi, bus, and trucks.

=== Public transportation system ===
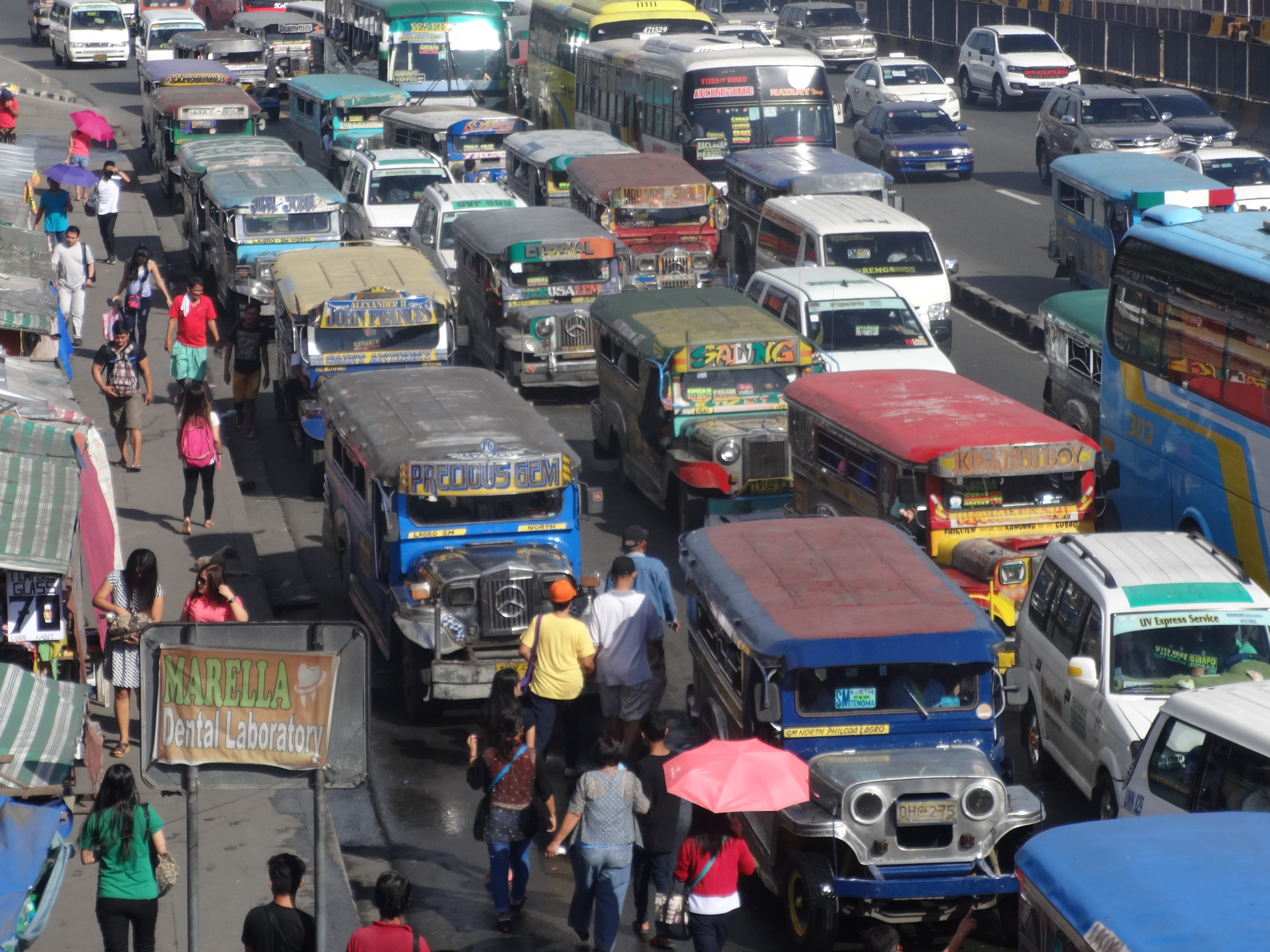
Traffic congestion created by jeepneys and buses along Commonwealth Avenue

The main modes of public transport in the Philippines are jeepneys, buses, taxis, trains and tricycles, all of which are readily available in Metro Manila. The introduction of transportation apps Grab and Uber came in 2013 and 2014, respectively, further widening the options of public transport. The Philippine traffic was considered the world's 9th worst in 2015 by Numbeo despite this range of public transport options. Although there is a wide array of choices, the public still spend an average of 45.5 minutes before reaching their workplace. This is why most Filipinos still find travelling via public transport inconvenient due to the high vehicle density and the unavoidable traffic congestion, according to Euromonitor's Consumer Lifestyles in the Philippines (2015).

=== Road accidents ===
According to Metro Manila Accident Reporting and Analysis System (MMARAS) data from 2008 to 2011 and a study of the severity of road crashes in Metro Manila, accidents that involved heavy and multiple vehicles, and an elderly pedestrian (60 years old and above), as well as those that occurred during the evening (7 pm to midnight) and late at night (1 am to 5 am) had significantly higher odds of resulting in a fatal outcome. But when the crash involves a female pedestrian and when the road surface is wet the odds of a fatal outcome are lower. The study found that most accidents involving pedestrians happen on high-speed, high-traffic-volume, multilane roadways, that are surrounded by land uses that generate a mix of heavy vehicular and pedestrian traffic. It was also found that fatal crashes involving pedestrian happen close to different types of transit stations.

== Effects ==
=== Societal ===
The congestion of vehicles on the road is not entirely unhealthy for the society. In a more specific viewpoint, the congestion between vehicles within a particular region, allows the circulation of other vehicles. Congestion occurs inevitably in highly urbanized sectors where the ratio between the population of people and the given area is not proportional and when the demand is high. In some cases, it is even desirable up to a certain point since getting rid of it imposes higher costs than allowing it to persist. The main social effects that occur due to the congestion of vehicles are namely: wasting of time (non-productivity; opportunity cost), delays, frustrated drivers/motorists/passengers, encouraging road rage.

=== Economic ===
Congestion on the road, from an Economic viewpoint suggests that higher levels of congestion are related to faster economic growth. However, above a certain limit, congestion starts to become a detriment to economic growth and the overall welfare of society, rather than an asset. This is due to the cost of the alleviation of congestion in some cities would be higher than the cost of congestion itself.

Loss of Revenue for Public Transport Public transport, trucks and other services are also affected by the traffic in Metro Manila. Instead of being able to do three or four round trips, they usually end up doing less; which means a significant loss in revenues, and ultimately leading to a failing business. Public transportation also suffers in that the available schedules become less frequent and the time spent waiting is longer.

=== Environmental effects ===
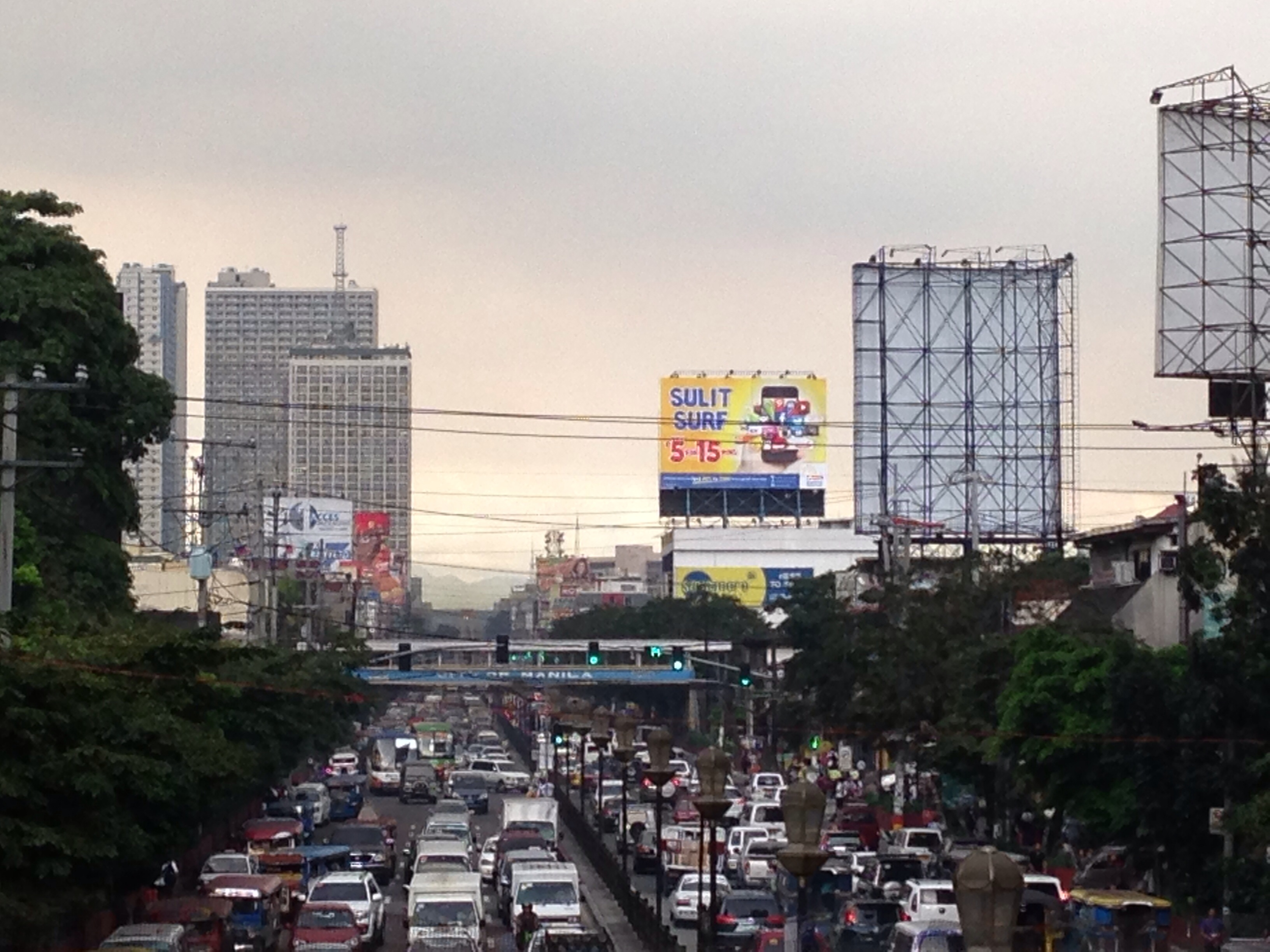
Afternoon rush hour traffic congestion at España Boulevard.

Traffic congestion has massive effects on the environment, specifically its contribution to air pollution. Air pollution has affected the lives of a number of Filipinos. The WHO said that air pollution is killing millions worldwide, including those in developing countries like the Philippines. The Metropolitan Manila Development Authority (MMDA) noted that dirty air threatens the lives of 12 million residents.

The effects of pollutants found in vehicle exhaust include the following:

- High levels of nitrogen oxide are toxic to humans
- Sulfur dioxide is the primary cause of acid rain
- Carbon dioxide contributes to climate change by insulating more heat from the sun
- Ozone can impair lung function

According to the National Emissions Inventory, last 2012, 71% of the air pollution in the Philippines comes from vehicles on the road. The situation is much worse in the National Capital Region (NCR), wherein 85% of the air pollution comes from vehicles. Also, based on data gathered from the Department of Environment and Natural Resources, Metro Manila's air quality situation has worsened in terms of total suspended particulates. There was a rise from 106 μg/Ncm in July to December 2014 to 130 μg/Ncm in January to April 2015, which are both above the maximum safe level of 90 μg/Ncm.

The more cars there are on the road, the more pollution is emitted into the air. This is because motor vehicles are one of the main sources of pollution in the world. On the other hand, there is an inverse relationship between the moving speed of traffic and air pollution. The slower the traffic moves, the more pollution is emitted into the air. This is due to the fact that cars burn the most fuel when accelerating to get up to speed. More gas is used up whenever there is an on and off pressing on the gas and break pedals during traffic jams.

There have been efforts to lessen the number of vehicles on the road and the production of fuel-efficient green cars with reduced emissions, but air pollution remains to be a problem. The Guardian said that “despite all the promises of green growth and reduced emissions, traditional car sales are accelerating, while efforts to shift towards ‘greener’ hybrid and electric vehicles are stuck in neutral, particularly in the place where it matters most.”

== Countermeasures ==
=== Department of Transportation ===
In August of 2016, The Department of Transportation (DOTr) has moved towards a more integrated approach to managing traffic on Metro Manila’s roads. The department divided the metropolis into 10 traffic sectors so as to be able to share assets among other government agencies involved in traffic management such as the Metropolitan Manila Development Authority (MMDA), the highway Patrol Group of the Philippine National Police (HPG-PNP), the Land Transportation Office (LTO) and the Land Transportation Franchising Regulatory Board (LTFRB). According to the DOTr, by combining forces and coming up with a single chain of command, the agencies will be able to collaborate for better traffic monitoring, uniform implementation of penalties and joint training for traffic personnel.

=== Metropolitan Manila Development Authority (MMDA) ===
The Metropolitan Manila Development Authority’s (MMDA) services include urban development planning, solid waste disposal, flood control and sewerage management, urban, renewal and zoning, health and sanitation, urban protection, pollution control, public safety during calamities and/or disasters and transport and traffic management; the latter acting as the MMDA’s most visible function.

==== The Unified Vehicular Volume Reduction Program (UVVRP) ====
The Unified Vehicular Volume Reduction Program (UVVRP) is what is more commonly referred to as the “color coding” or “number coding” system implemented by the MMDA. It is a travel demand management program meant to ration road space based on the license plates of vehicles; by regulating the number of vehicles using the roads, the program thereby reduces volume and eases traffic congestion.

The scheme was intended to be a temporary solution of the traffic congestion caused by infrastructure projects in the 1990s. It is still being used and remains to be one of the MMDA's most well-known traffic initiatives.

The first version of the UVVRP was implemented in 1995. During the 1990s, there were many road and railway infrastructure projects being built throughout Metro Manila; in order to address the resulting increase in congestion, the MMDA issued Regulation No. 95-001 or the “Odd-Even Scheme.” The scheme banned private vehicles with less than three passengers from passing restricted roads during AM and PM peak periods on particular days. Vehicles in use for public transportation, emergencies, police and military, school buses, diplomatic matters and official media were exempted from this regulation.

On Tuesdays, Thursdays and Saturdays, vehicles with license plates that ended in odd numbers were restricted from use; while those that ended in even numbers were restricted from use on Mondays, Wednesday and Fridays. The peak periods during which the vehicles were banned were defined to be from 7:00-9:00 am and 5:00-7:00pm. Per violation, there was a P300 penalty charged to offenders.

Regulation 96—or the "Modified Odd-Even Scheme"—was then issued in 1996. This scheme applied to public utility vehicles such as taxis, buses, public utility jeepneys, etc., which are banned from all streets of Metro Manila on particular days of the week from 9:00 am to 5:00 pm based on the plate number ending of each vehicle, as follows: 1 and 2 on Mondays, 3 and 4 on Tuesdays, 5 and 6 on 7 Wednesdays, 7 and 8 on Thursdays, 9 and 0 on Fridays. This regulation took effect February 19, 1996 and covered all roads in Metropolitan Manila.

1996 was also the year the MMDA, adopted Regulation 96-005 entitled the “Unified Vehicular Volume Reduction Program” as a replacement of Regulations Nos. 95-001 and 96-004. This program aimed to regulate the operation of certain motor vehicles on all national, city and municipal roads in Metropolitan Manila. Under this scheme, private vehicles are banned for longer hours (i.e., between 7:00 am and 7:00 pm).

In 2003, the UVVRP was modified to allow for a window time between 10:00 am and 3:00 pm, which was considered to be the off-peak period within the day when restricted vehicles could travel along the specified roads. This scheme, however, was not uniformly adopted in all cities and municipalities throughout metropolis due to differing traffic conditions.

In 2010, the UVVRP included both public transportation and private vehicles under the scheme.

Today, the provision of the UVVRP are as follows: vehicles cannot drive around Metro Manila based on the last digit of the license plate. 1 and 2 are banned on Mondays, 3 and 4 on Tuesdays, 5 and 6 on Wednesdays 7 and 8 on Thursdays and 9 and 0 on Fridays. The period of the UVVRP is from 7 am to 8 pm without window hours and it applies to national, circumferential and radial roads in the metropolis.

The plate numbers restrained from driving within Metro Manila are summarized into this table:

Day	Last digit of plate number
Monday	1, 2
Tuesday	3, 4
Wednesday	5, 6
Thursday	7, 8
Friday	9, 0

==== Truck Ban Ordinance ====
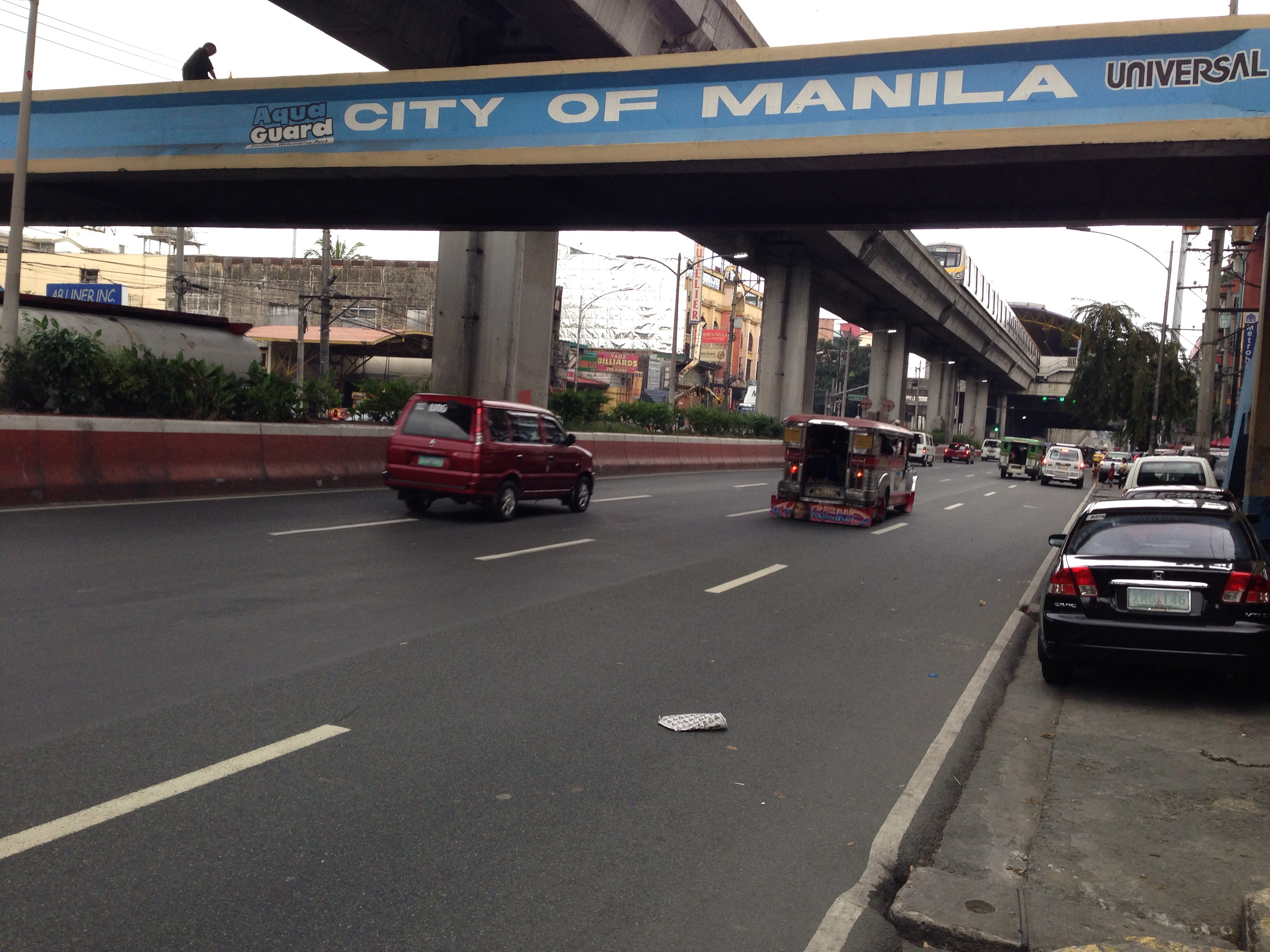
Magsaysay Boulevard is one of the roads where MMDA's truck ban ordinance is being implemented.

The truck ban is a scheme meant to address the perception that freight vehicles are the main culprits in congesting Metro Manila roads. Under this scheme, trucks are prohibited from traveling along major road networks for most of the day, depending on the type and weight of truck. It has been in place since 1978 and restrains large trucks to designated routes in order to give way to other road users. Infractions of the ban carry a fine of P2000.

For trucks weighing more than 4,500 kilograms (9,900 lb), the truck ban is implemented accordingly:

From 6:00 a.m. - 10:00 a.m. and from 5:00 p.m. - 10:00 p.m. every day except Sundays and Holidays, no cargo truck shall be allowed to travel or pass along:

- España Boulevard through Quezon Avenue from Echague Street to the intersection of West and Timog Avenues;
- Claro M. Recto Avenue from Legarda Street to Del Pan Street;
- Quirino Avenue from Osmeña Highway to Roxas Boulevard;
- Padre Burgos Street through Ayala Boulevard, Legarda Street, Magsaysay Boulevard, and Aurora Boulevard, from Roxas Boulevard to Boston Street;
- Eulogio Rodriguez Sr. Avenue through Bonifacio Avenue from Welcome Rotonda to Shoe Avenue;
- Osmeña Highway through Nagtahan Bridge and Alfonso Mendoza Street from EDSA to Dimasalang Street;
- Taft Avenue through Quirino Avenue from Redemptorist Street to Plaza Lawton, to include MacArthur, Quezon and Jones Bridges;
- Bonifacio Drive through Roxas Boulevard and NAIA Road to Aduana Street to Ninoy Aquino International Airport;
- Rizal Avenue through Rizal Avenue Extension from Carriedo Street to the Bonifacio Monument;
- Reina Regente Street through Abad Santos Avenue from Reina Regente Bridge to Rizal Avenue Extension;
- Makati Central Business District;
- Ortigas Center; and
- Bonifacio Global City, Taguig

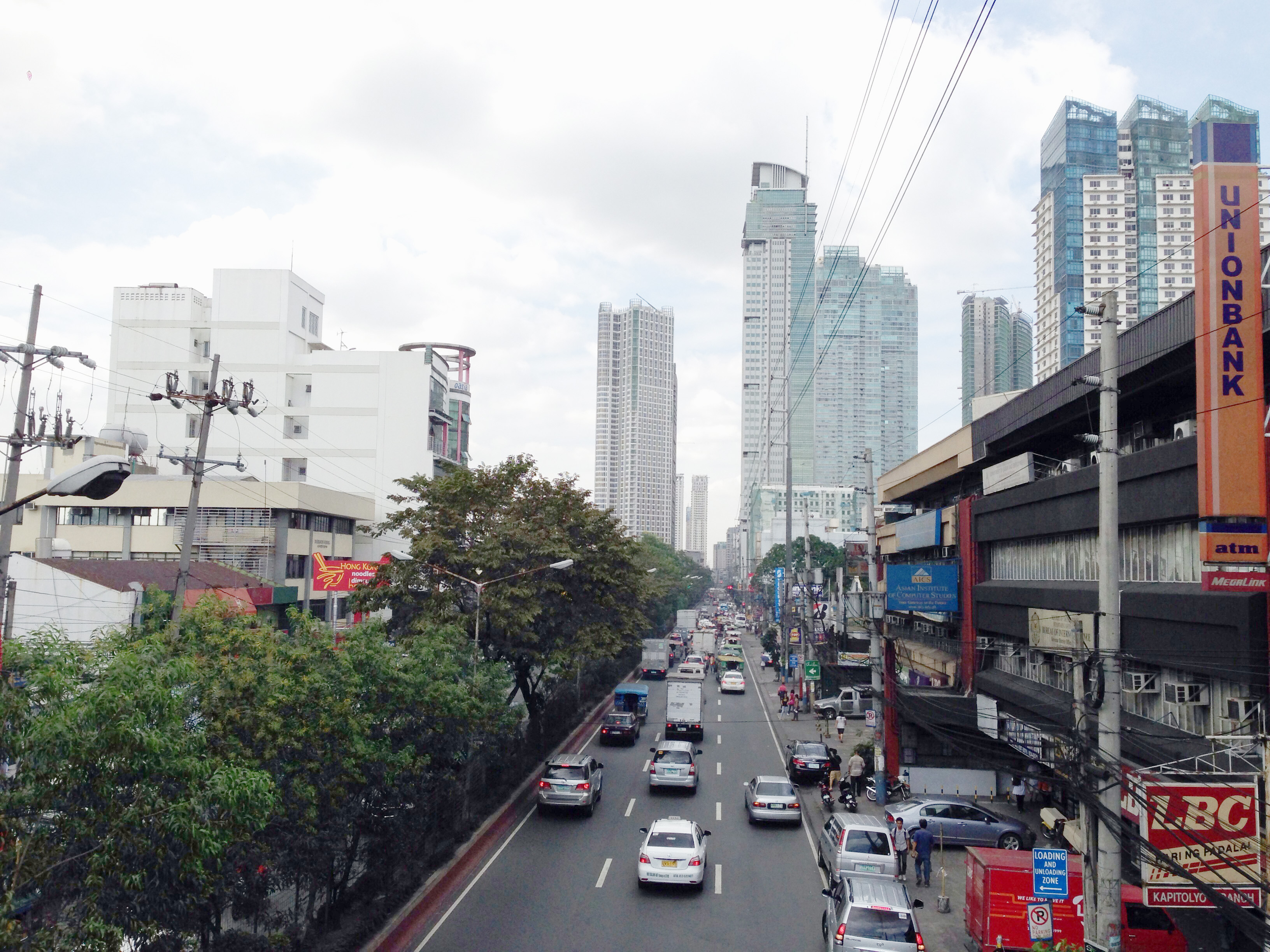
At Shaw Boulevard, truck ban is enforced from 6am to 10 am and 5pm to 10pm, Monday to Saturday.

For trucks weighing a total of 4,500 kilograms (9,900 lb) or lower, the ban applies as follows:

From 6 am to 10 am, Monday through Saturday, cargo trucks are prohibited from passing these certain roads

- EDSA southbound
- Shaw Boulevard (from Mandaluyong and Pasig)

From 5 pm to 10 pm, Monday through Saturday, cargo trucks are prohibited from passing these certain roads

- EDSA northbound
- Entire stretch of Shaw Boulevard

The ban was first applied in 1978 in recognition of the critical state of traffic congestion being experienced in Metro Manila through the Ordinance No.78-04. This act prohibited cargo trucks with a gross vehicular weight of over 4,000 kilograms (8,800 lb) from driving along eleven major roads in Metro Manila during peak traffic hours (6:00 am – 9:00 am, and 4:00 pm – 8:00 pm) daily except on weekends.

The Department of Transportation and Communication issued Memorandum Circulars No. 90–367 in 1990 which repealed the previous truck ban schedule and changed it to the following:

- 7:00 am – 10:00 am on weekdays
- 4:00 pm – 8:00 pm Monday-Thursday
- 4:00 pm – 9:00 pm on Fridays

In 1991, in response to the appeal for an alternate route and reduction of the truck ban, the MMDA issues Ordinance No. 19, amending the original Ordinance No. 78-04. This provided alternate routes to those included in the truck ban and allowed a 2-hour reduction of the truck ban period resulting in these effects:

- 7:00 am – 9:00 am on weekdays
- 5:00 pm – 8:00 pm Monday-Thursday
- 4:00 pm – 9:00 pm on Fridays

This was further amended when Ordinance No. 5 Series of 1994 was issued. As a result, trucks were banned from the major arterial road Epifanio Delos Santos Avenue. This was an “all-day” ban that lasted from 6:00 am – 9:00 pm and was implemented Monday through Friday. It also restricted trucks from passing along 10 major routes between these particular hours: • 6:00 am – 9:00 am (daily with the exception of Saturdays, Sundays and holidays) • 5:00 pm – 9:00 pm (daily with the exception of Saturdays, Sundays and holidays)

Since then, the MMDA has issued Regulation No. 96–008 in 1996 thus extending truck ban to Saturdays; leaving only Sundays and holidays as the exception. This was done in desire to further reduce traffic congestion experienced throughout the week. The gross capacity weight of trucks was also changed from 4,000 kilograms (8,800 lb) to 4,500 kilograms (9,900 lb) by the issuance of Regulation No. 99-002.

==== U-Turn scheme ====
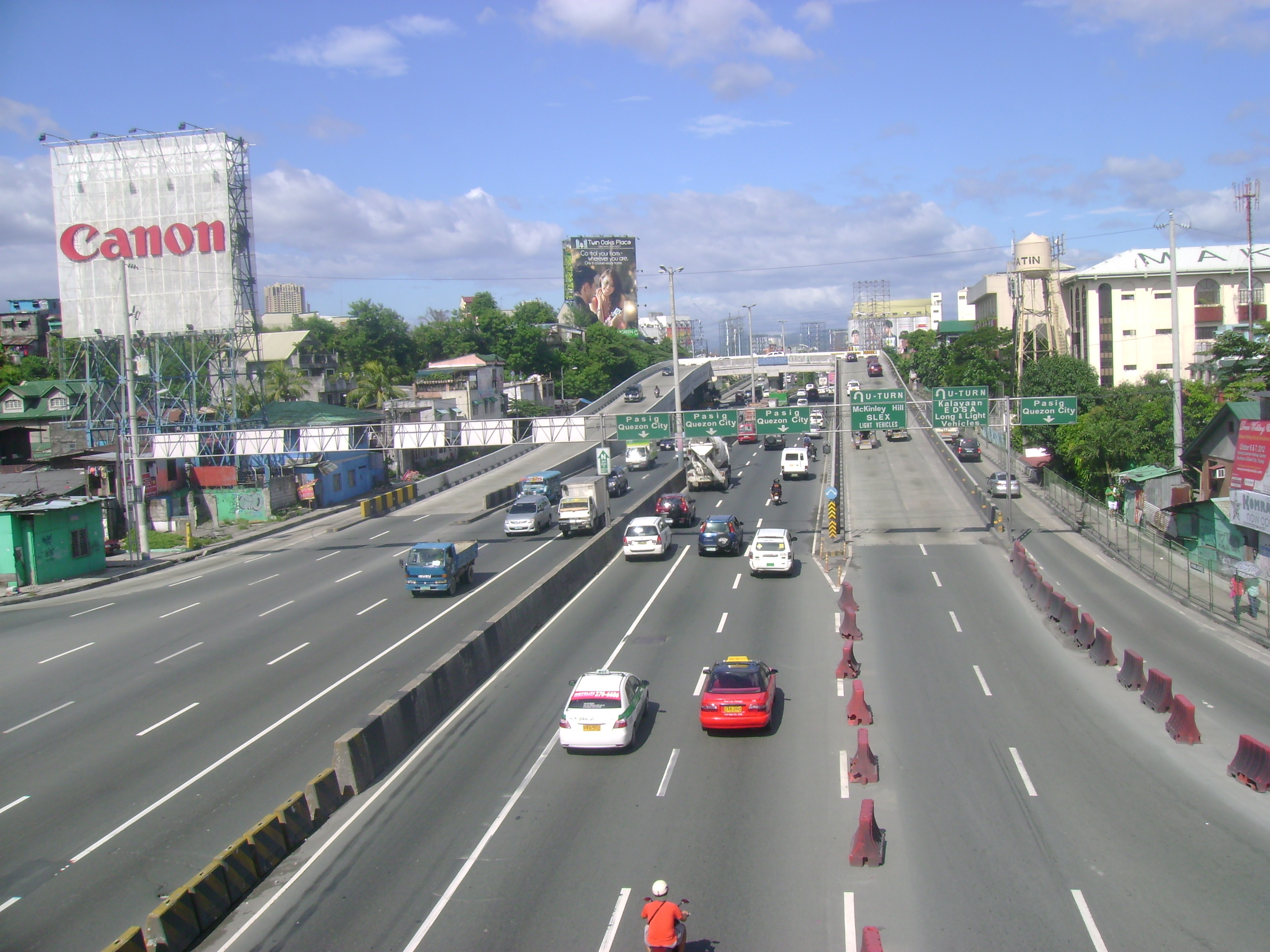
An elevated U-turn slot at Carlos P. Garcia Avenue or C-5 Road in Taguig

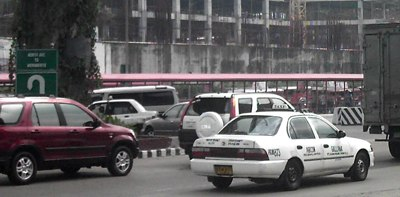
A U-turn slot along EDSA.

The U-turn Scheme was implemented by the MMDA in 2002 primarily to account for roundabout operations on the road. This entailed the creation of median opens along busy arterial roads and was composed of two originally separate schemes: the “Big Rotunda Scheme” and the “Clearway Scheme”.

Big Rotunda Scheme

- Construction of median opening pairs
- Closing intersection by use of temporary barriers

Clearway Scheme

- Promote uninterrupted flow along arterial roads
- Meant to speed up congestion along clogged roads

Essentially, the scheme resulted in the closing of many road intersections as well as the suspension of traffic signal operations in order to allow for the system of median openings. The set up of the U-turn scheme caused lanes of vehicles approaching an intersection to converge and thus be diverted into a single stream towards the U-turn.

The U-turn scheme was first applied along Commonwealth Avenue in Quezon City and Marikina–Infanta Highway in Pasig and Marikina. Later on, the scheme was also implemented in other areas on Metro Manila including various intersections along EDSA.

==== Social Media Platforms ====
Since 2010, the MMDA has tapped into the use of social media such as Twitter, in an effort to alleviate the traffic situation. Through such platforms, the MMDA is able to broadcast live updates to their followers, send out and respond to tweets 24 hours a day. The Twitter feed is mostly used to relay information regarding traffic, accidents and number coding (UVVRP) updates.

==== Mobile Application: MMDA Traffic Navigator ====
The MMDA Traffic Navigator was a mobile application launched in 2011 for android and iOS meant to give users quick access to traffic situations surrounding the Metro Manila's major routes. It delivers real-time traffic updates in specific roads and highways by relying on CCTVs to assess the congestion in particular areas. In areas where there are no available CCTVs, reports are instead collected from traffic enforces. The application may be accessed via system view or line view; and provides indicators as to whether the current traffic is considered light, moderate or heavy.

== See also ==
- Traffic congestion
- Transportation in Metro Manila
- Transportation in the Philippines
- Public Utility Vehicle Modernization Program
