= Radial Road 7 =

Road network in Metro Manila, Philippines

R-7 Radial Road 7
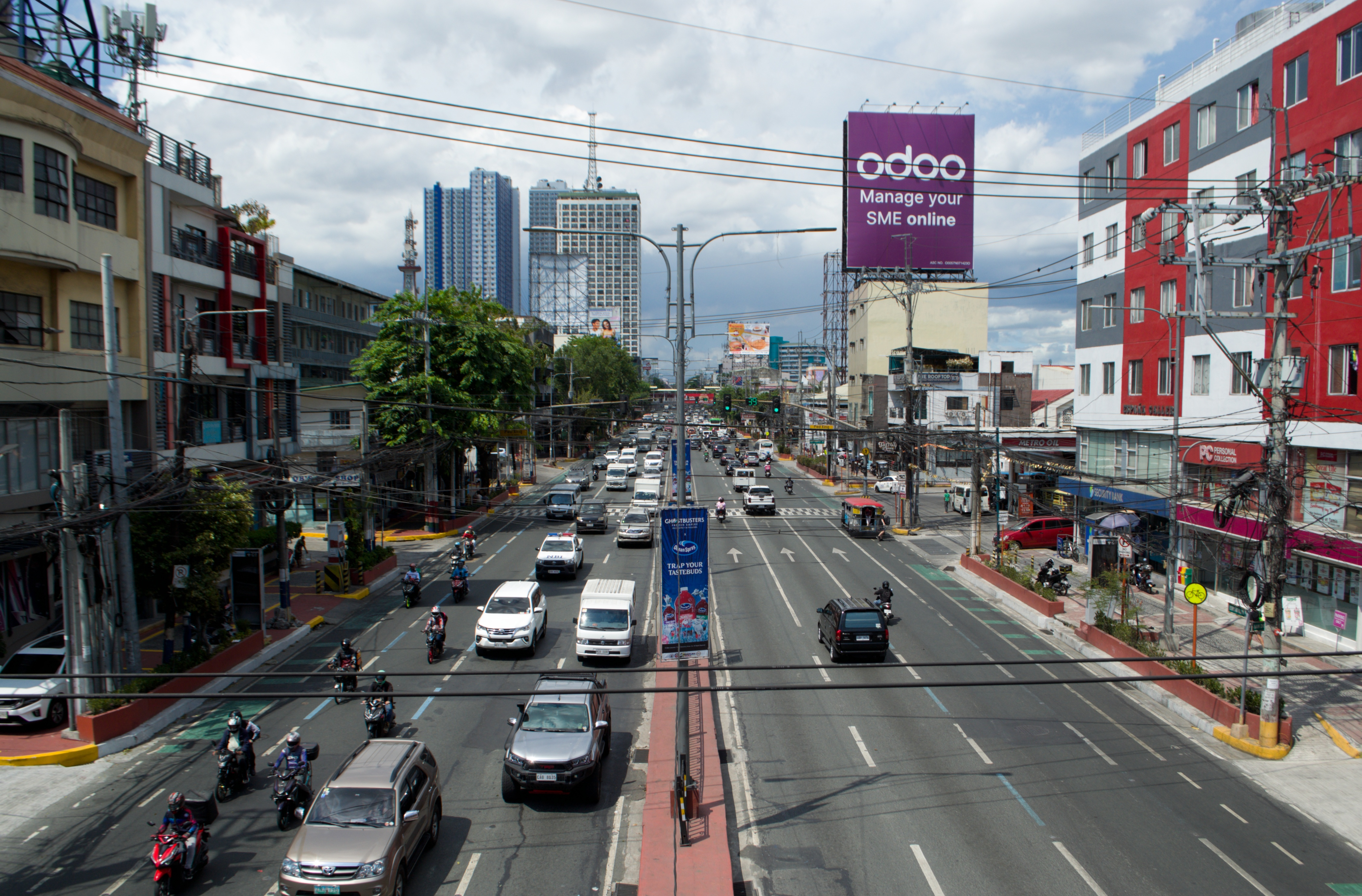
- España Boulevard, a component of R-7

Route information
- Maintained by Department of Public Works and Highways (entire route) and Metropolitan Manila Development Authority (within Metro Manila)
- Length: 48 km (30 mi)
- Component highways: N170

Major junctions
- South end: N170 (Quezon Boulevard) and Alfonso Mendoza Street in Manila
- North end: N127 (Quirino Highway) in Norzagaray

Location
- Country: Philippines
- Major cities: Manila and Quezon City

Highway system
- Roads in the Philippines; Highways; Expressways; List

Radial Road 7 (R-7), informally known as the R-7 Road, is a network of roads and bridges which comprise the seventh arterial road of Metro Manila in the Philippines. It connects the cities of Manila and Quezon City. It is one of ten radial roads in Metro Manila that connect Manila outwards to adjacent cities.

== Route description ==
=== Lerma Street ===
Lerma Street is an 8-lane road connecting Quezon Boulevard (R-8) and España Boulevard in Sampaloc, Manila.

=== España Boulevard ===
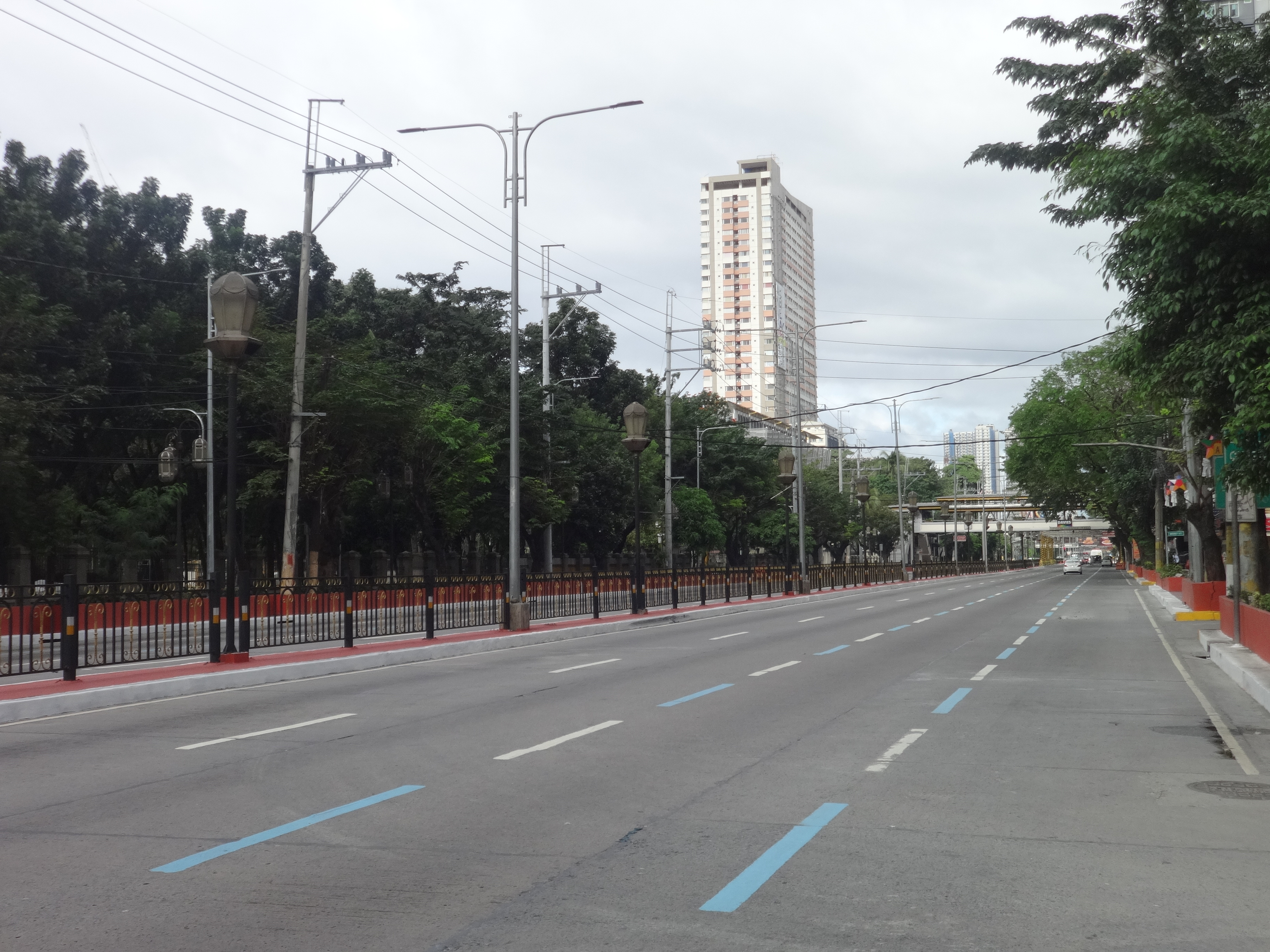
España Boulevard

España Boulevard is an 8-lane road starting from the junction of Lerma Avenue and Nicanor Reyes Street and ending in the Mabuhay Rotonda (otherwise known as Welcome Rotonda) in Quezon City. It passes through the northernmost areas of the University Belt, including the University of Santo Tomas and Ramon Magsaysay High School. Past RMHS, it passes through the mostly residential and commercial area of Sampaloc.

=== Quezon Avenue ===
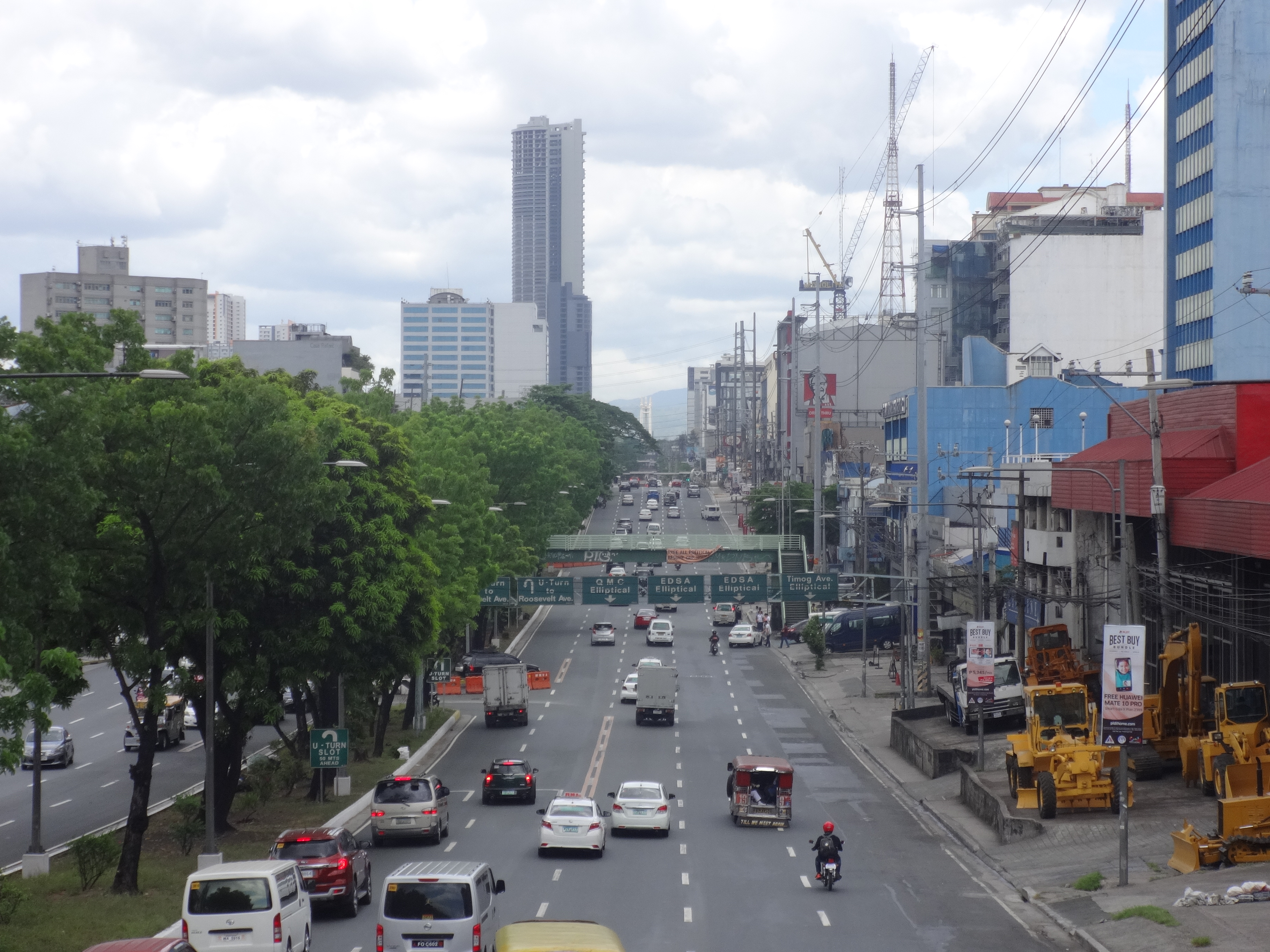
Quezon Avenue

Quezon Avenue starts from the Mabuhay Rotunda and ends on Elliptical Road. It is one of the most important thoroughfares of Quezon City. It runs through the city center, lined with palm trees, government buildings, and nightclubs. It uses an interchange system at most of its intersections. This road used to be one of the most comfortable roads in the area, but it has been extremely prone to heavy traffic since the construction of the G. Araneta Avenue Underpass.

=== Elliptical Road ===
Elliptical Road is an 8-lane roundabout that circumscribes Quezon City Memorial Circle. R-7 continues at Commonwealth Avenue.

=== Commonwealth Avenue ===
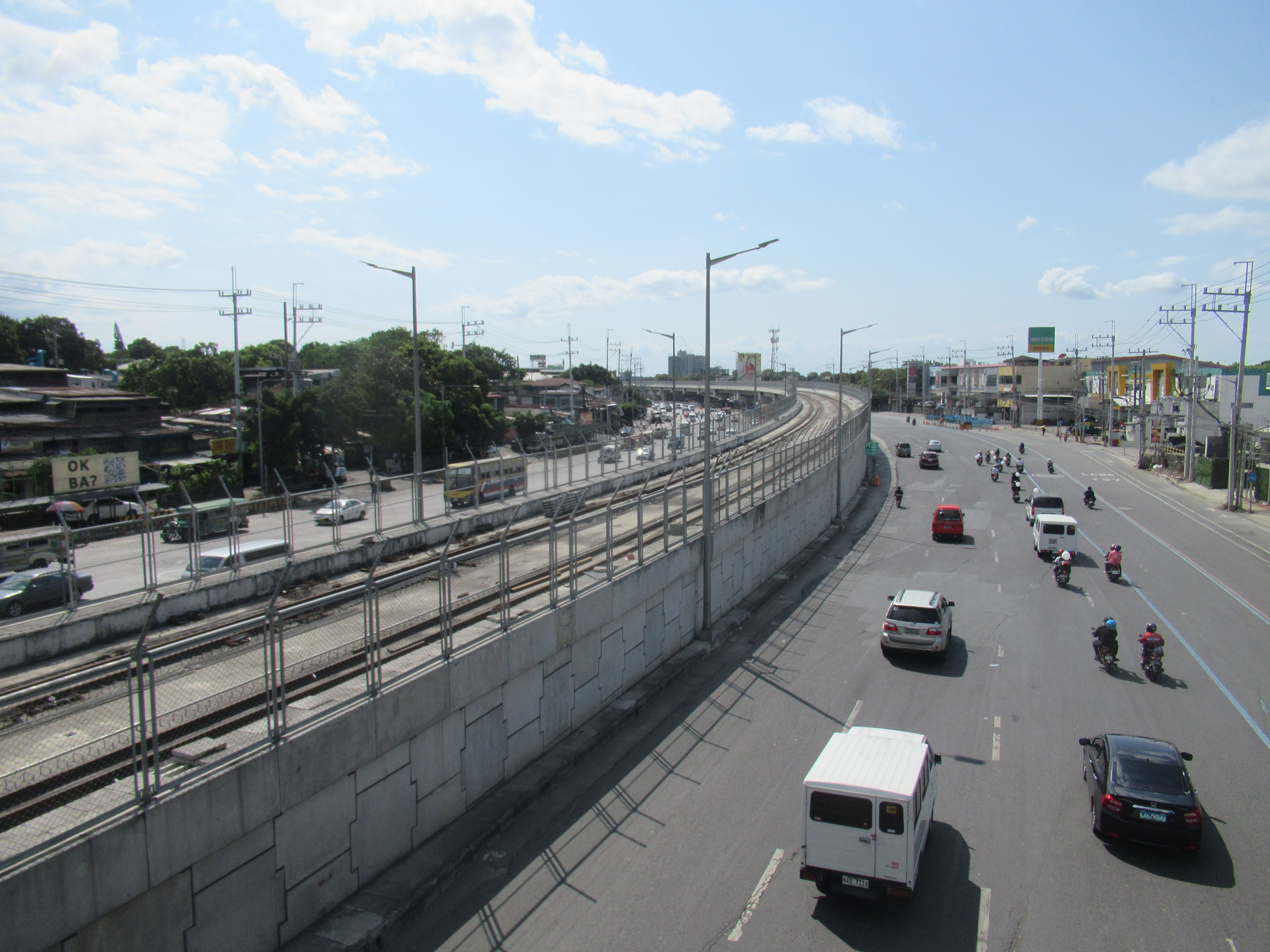
Commonwealth Avenue

Commonwealth Avenue starts from Elliptical Road and is an 18-lane highway, the widest road in the Philippines. The R-7 segment also includes the Batasan Tunnel, which accommodates vehicles entering the avenue's southbound lane from Batasan Road's southern end. The avenue ends with a junction with the Quirino Highway.

== See also ==
- List of roads in Metro Manila
