= Dimasalang Street =

Major road in Manila, Philippines

R-8 Dimasalang Street
- Dimasalang Road
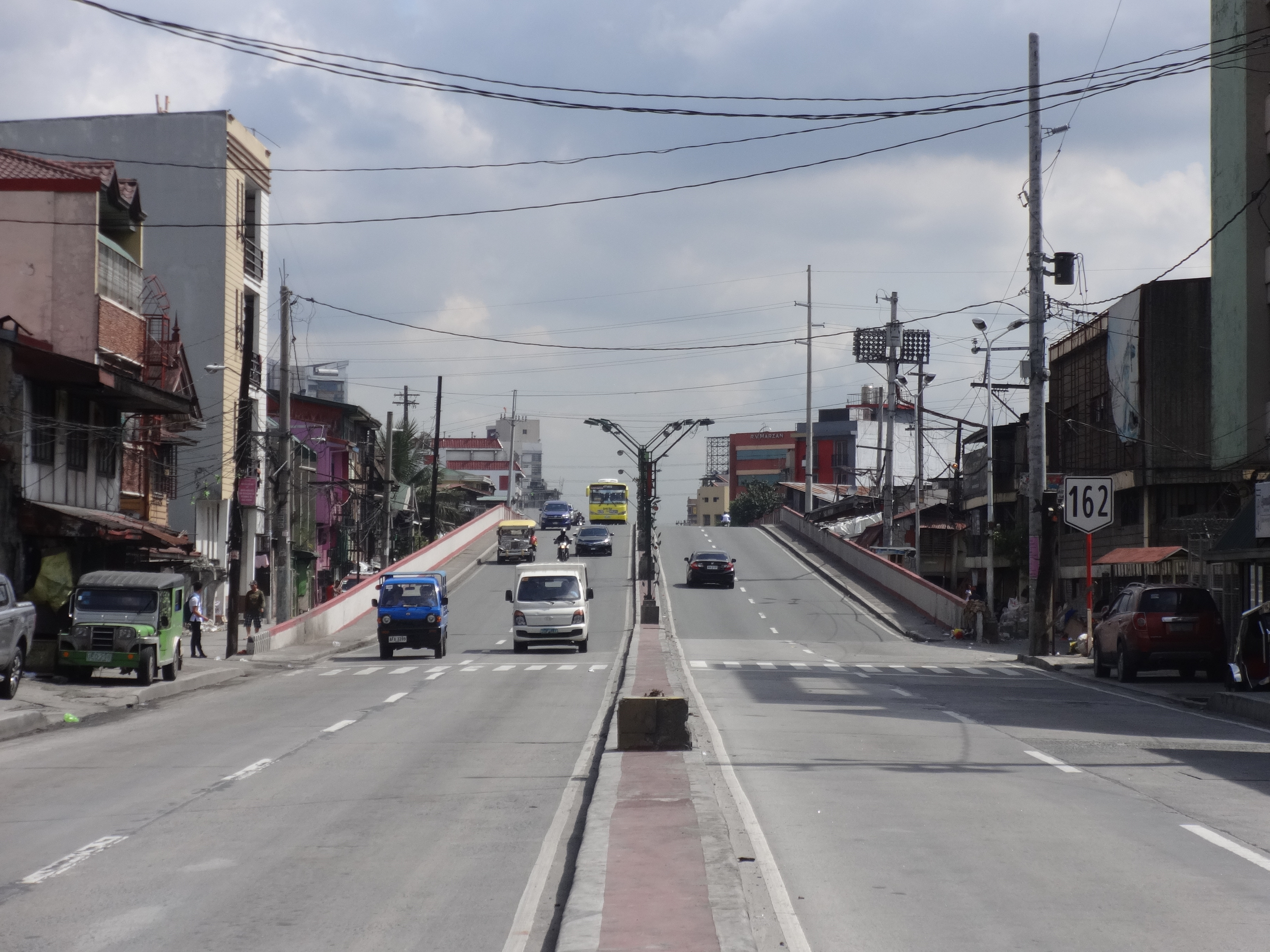
- Dimasalang Street looking north towards the Dimasalang Bridge in 2017, prior to the construction of the NLEX Connector

Route information
- Maintained by Department of Public Works and Highways – North Manila District Engineering Office
- Length: 1.9 km (1.2 mi)
- Component highways: R-8 R-8; N162

Major junctions
- North end: N160 (Blumentritt Road)
- South end: N140 (Lacson Avenue) and Laon Laan Street

Location
- Country: Philippines
- Major cities: Manila

Highway system
- Roads in the Philippines; Highways; Expressways; List
← N161	→ N170

Dimasalang Street, also known as Dimasalang Road, is a major road between the districts of Sampaloc and Santa Cruz in Manila, the capital city of the Philippines. Running 1.9 kilometres (1.2 mi) in a north–south direction, it connects Lacson Avenue and Laon Laan Street in the south to Blumentritt Road, near the city's border with Quezon City, in the north. It also crosses over the Philippine National Railway tracks and below the NLEX Connector at Dimasalang Bridge. It is named after Dimasalang, one of the pen names of the Philippine national hero José Rizal. It was originally developed in the early 20th century as part of the original Rizal Park development where the street names were named in honor of Rizal's life and literary works.

The entire route is designated as National Route 162 (N162) of the Philippine highway network and a component of Radial Road 8 of the Metro Manila arterial road system.

The bridge over the Philippine National Railways track was scheduled to be repaired between August and December 2025 by the Department of Public Works and Highways. However, Manila Mayor Isko Moreno opposed the repair, citing that it was not coordinated with the city government.

== Landmarks ==
This is from its north end at the junction with Blumentritt Road to its south end on its junction with Lacson Avenue:

- Manila North Cemetery
- Dangwa Bus Terminal
- Dimasalang Bridge (Philippine National Railways)
- Hospital of the Infant Jesus
- Dangwa Flower Market

== Intersections ==
The entire route is located in Manila.

km	mi	Destinations	Notes
		N160 (Blumentritt Road)	Northern terminus. No entry from Blumentritt Road.
		Aurora Boulevard, Retiro Street	Traffic light intersection with one-way traffic scheme.
		Maceda Street	Traffic light intersection with Retiro Street and Aurora Boulevard. Alternative access to N170 (España Boulevard).
		Tiago Street	Southbound only.
		Craig Street	Northbound only.
		Makiling Street	Northbound only.
		Kundiman Street	Northbound only.
		North end of Dimasalang Bridge	
		Quintos Sr. Street	Northbound service road only.
		San Diego Street	Northbound service road only.
		South end of Dimasalang Bridge	
		Balaguer Street	Southbound service road only.
		Cristobal Street	Northbound only.
		Becerra Street	Southbound only.
		Vicente G. Cruz Street, Simoun Street	Northbound only.
		J. Marzan Street	Northbound only.
		M. Dela Fuente Street, Aragon Street	Northbound one-way to and southbound one-way from Dimasalang Road, respectively.
		Don Quijote Street, Maria Clara Street	Traffic light intersection.
		Carola Street	Northbound only.
		Dos Castillas Street	Both segments accessible thru nearest crossings.
		N140 (Arsenio H. Lacson Avenue), Laon Laan Street	Southern terminus and traffic light intersection. Access to Quezon City, Welcome Rotonda and Quiapo via Laon Laan Street; N150 (Rizal Avenue) and N170 (España Boulevard) via A.H. Lacson Avenue.
1.000 mi = 1.609 km; 1.000 km = 0.621 mi: Incomplete access
