= Ramon Magsaysay High School, Manila =

Public high school in Manila, Philippines

Ramon Magsaysay High School
- Mataas na Paaralang Ramon Magsaysay (Filipino)

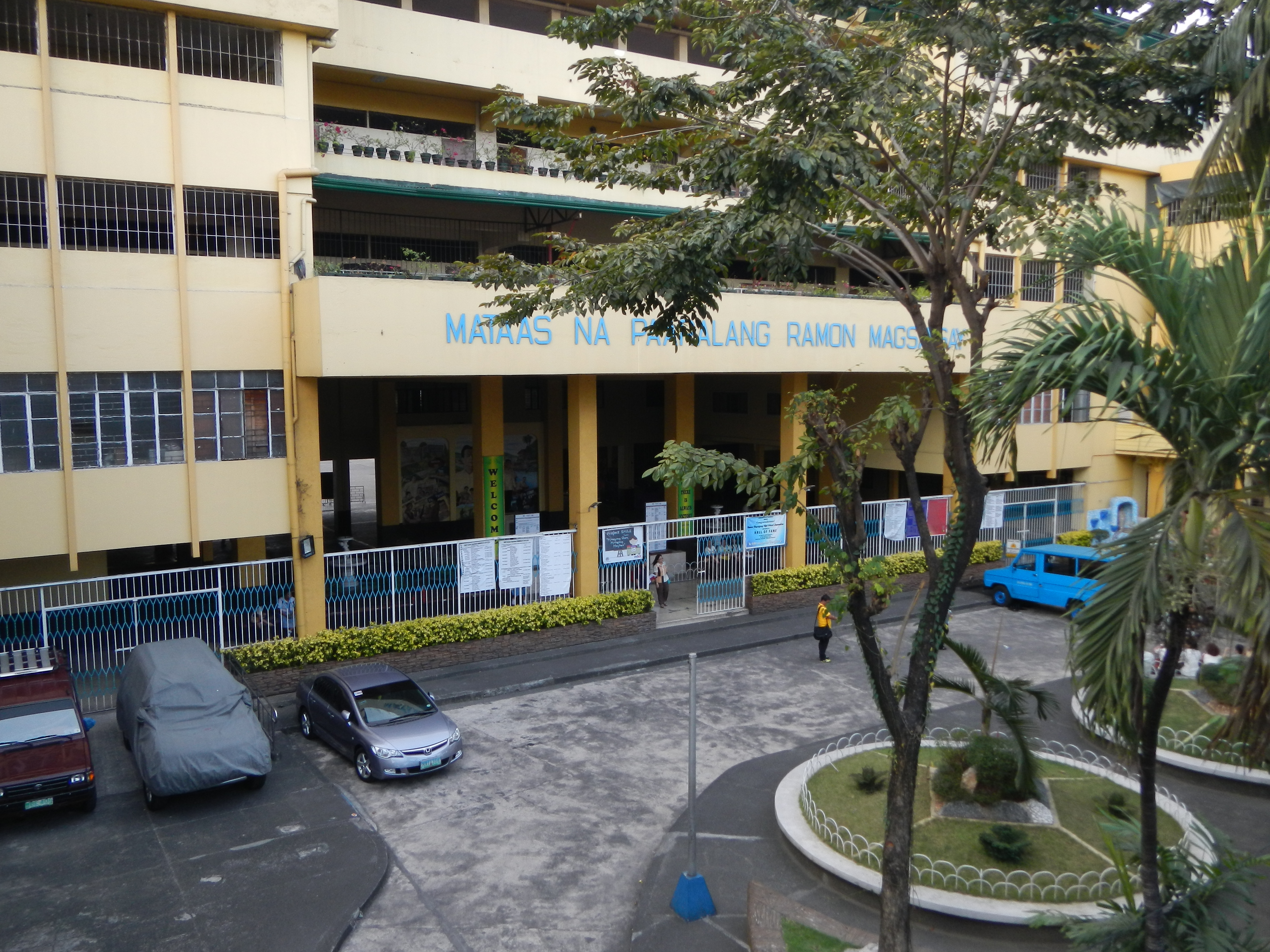

Location
- España Boulevard cor. Don Quixote St. Sampaloc; City of Manila, Metro Manila; Philippines
- 14°36′40″N 120°59′35″E

Information
- Type: Public, Special Science
- Motto: Uphold the Culture of Excellence
- Established: 1959
- Principal: Mr. Robert P. Velasquez
- Grades: 7 to 10
- Enrollment: approx. 7000
- Language: English, Filipino, Spanish (elective)
- Campus size: 1 hectare (2.5 acres)
- Color
- Nickname: RMHS, Monsay
- Publication: 'Blue and White' (English) 'Ang Silahis' (Filipino)
- Affiliations: Division of City Schools-Manila

Ramon Magsaysay High School (RMHS) is a high school in Manila, Philippines. It was founded as the Governor Forbes annex of V. Mapa High School in 1952. In 1958 it was renamed Gov. Forbes High School, in honor of former Philippine governor general William Cameron Forbes. Finally in 1959, it was renamed Ramon Magsaysay High School, in honor of former Philippine president Ramon Magsaysay.

== History ==
Ten principals in turn have led the school:

- Maria M. Ocampo (1959–1972)
- William L. Estrada (1972–1976)
- Mateo A. Angeles (1976–1987)
- Esperanza B. Bautista (1987–1995)
- Elena R. Ruiz (1996–1997)
- Leon R. San Miguel (1997–1999)
- Cristina C. Reyes (1999–2010)
- Alma C. Tadina (2010–2017)
- Gene T. Pangilinan (2017–2024)
- Robert P. Velasquez (January 2024–present)

== See also ==
- Sampaloc, Manila#Education
