= Radial Road 8 =

Road network in Luzon, Philippines

R-8 Radial Road 8
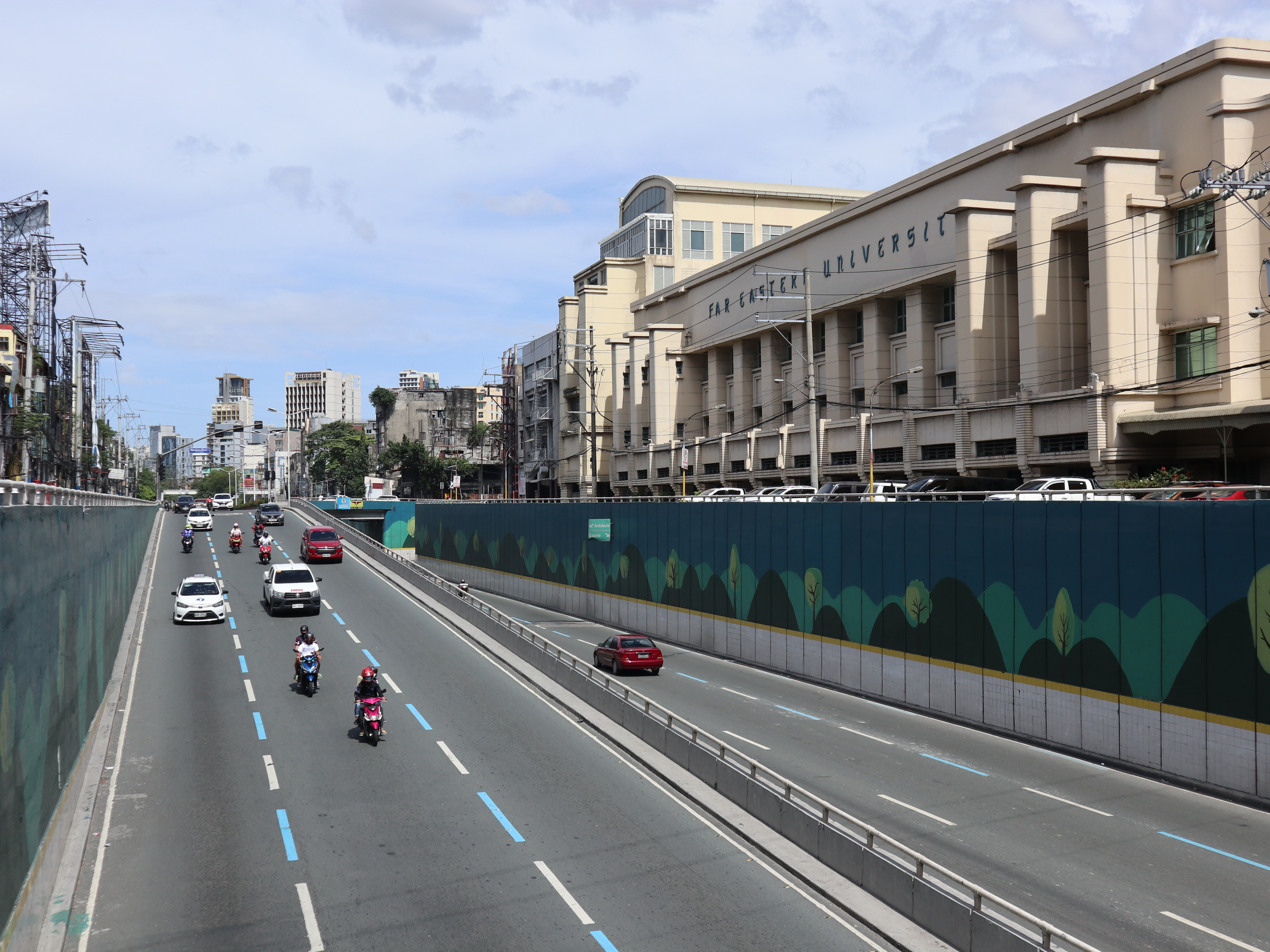
- Quezon Boulevard Underpass in Quiapo, part of the R-8 Road

Route information
- Length: 210.0 km (130.5 mi)
- Component highways: N170 in Manila; N150 in Manila; N160 in Quezon City; AH 26 (E1) from Quezon City to Guiguinto; Spur: N127 in Quezon City

R-8 Main Route
- South end: N170 (Quezon Bridge) in the City of Manila
- North end: N2 (Manila North Road) in Rosario, La Union

R-8 Spur (Quirino Highway)
- South end: AH 26 (E1) in Unang Sigaw, Quezon City
- North end: N170 (Commonwealth Avenue) in Kaligayahan, Quezon City

Location
- Country: Philippines

Highway system
- Roads in the Philippines; Highways; Expressways; List

Radial Road 8 (R-8), informally known as the R-8 Road, is a network of roads and bridges which comprise the eighth radial road of Metro Manila in the Philippines. It runs north-south through northern Metro Manila, linking the city of Manila with Quezon City, Caloocan, and Valenzuela into the northern provinces of Bulacan, Pampanga, Tarlac, Pangasinan, and La Union. The portion of R-8 between Guiguinto and Balintawak is also designated a component of the Pan-Philippine Highway network (AH26). It also has a spur segment in Quirino Highway from NLEX to its junction with R-7 at Commonwealth Avenue, both in Quezon City.

== Route description ==
=== Quezon Boulevard ===
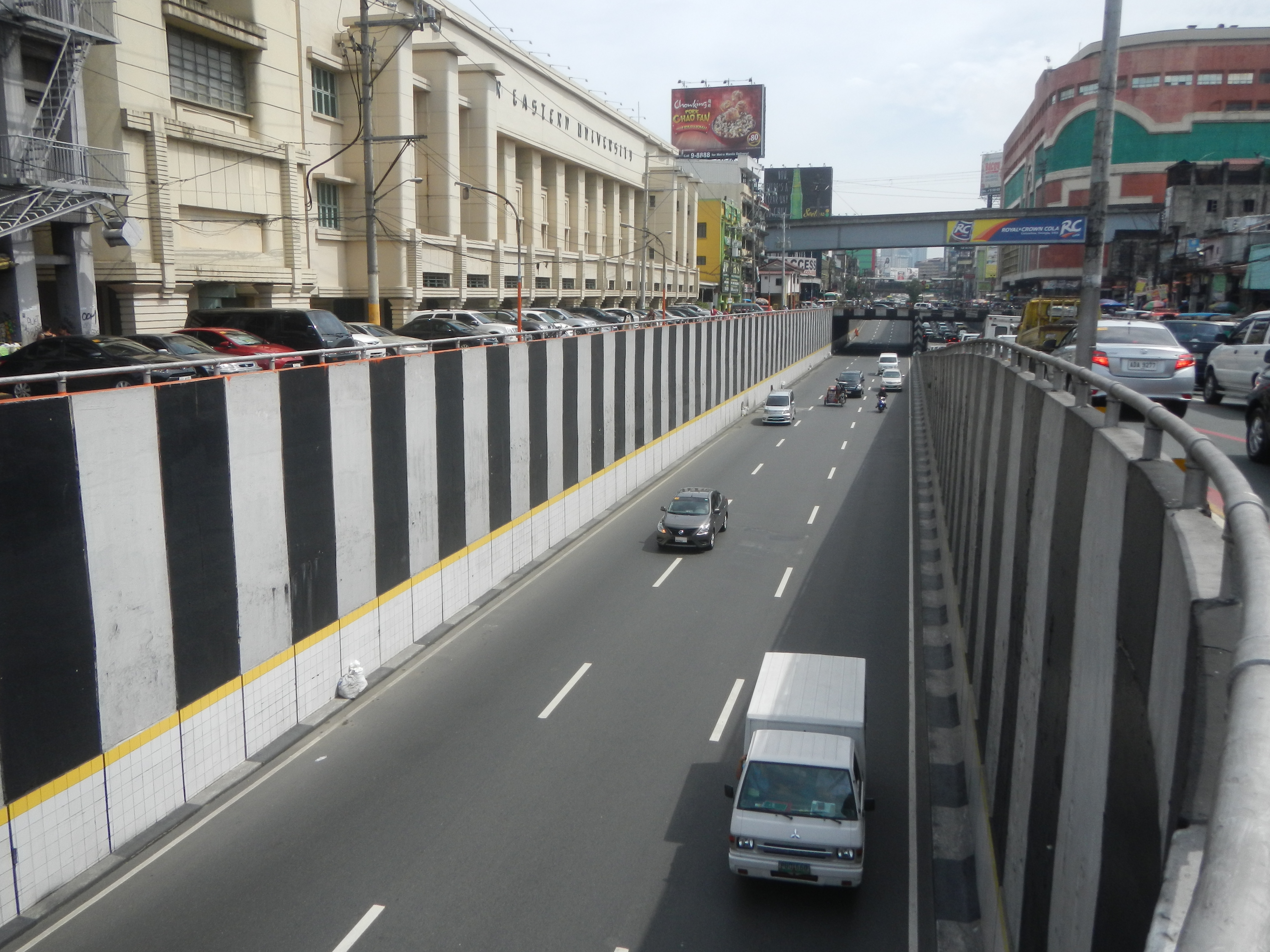
Quezon Boulevard south of Recto Avenue

Between Quezon Bridge over the Pasig River in the district of Quiapo and Lerma Street in Sampaloc, R-8 is known as Quezon Boulevard. It is the main north-south thoroughfare of Quiapo, which is also linked to Radial Road 7 (R-7) via a tunnel to Lerma Street.

=== Alfonso Mendoza Street ===
Between Lerma Street and Laong Laan Street, R-8 is carried by Alfonso Mendoza Street (formerly Calle Andalucía), which continues Quezon Boulevard along the Sampaloc–Santa Cruz border. Past Laong Laan, the street continues unassigned up to Lacson Avenue.

=== Dimasalang Street ===
Between Lacson Avenue and Blumentritt Road at Sampaloc's border with Quezon City, R-8 is known as Dimasalang Street. At its south end, it passes the Dangwa flower market and leads to the Manila North Green Park and the Manila North Cemetery main gate at its north end before merging with Bonifacio Avenue.

=== A. Bonifacio Avenue ===
A. Bonifacio Avenue carries R-8 between Blumentritt Road and Epifanio de los Santos Avenue (EDSA). It intersects with Del Monte Avenue and 5th Avenue, a part of Circumferential Road 3 (C-3), before intersecting with EDSA and North Luzon Expressway at the Balintawak Cloverleaf.

=== North Luzon Expressway ===
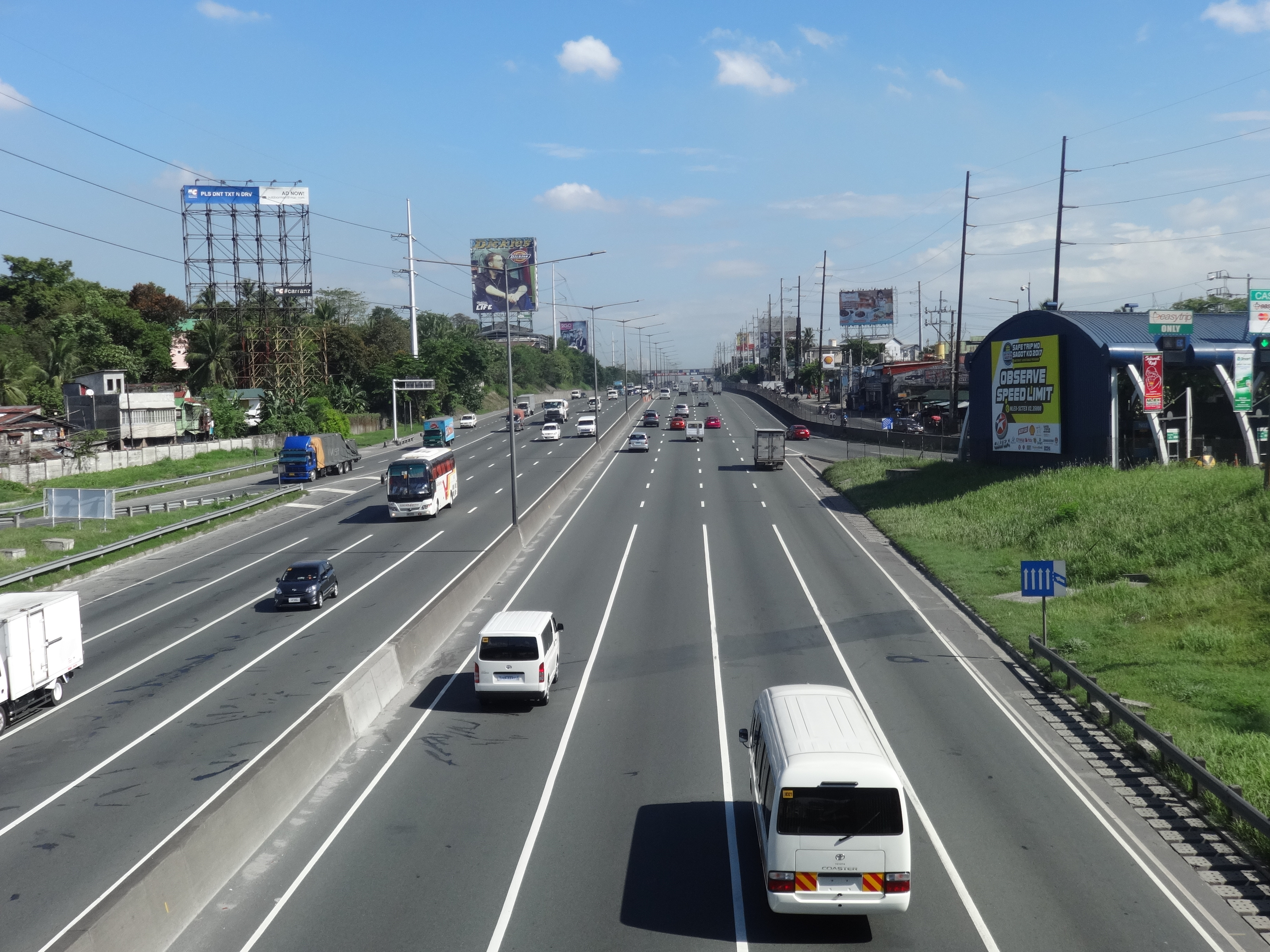
NLEX just north of Paso de Blas Interchange

The main segment of R-8 is the North Luzon Expressway (NLEX). It leads motorists out of Metro Manila into the Central Luzon provinces of Bulacan and Pampanga, passing through Quezon City and Valenzuela. The section of NLEX between the Santa Rita Interchange in Guiguinto and the Balintawak Interchange in Quezon City is also the route of the Pan-Philippine Highway (AH26) from the Cagayan Valley Road to EDSA. The road ends at an interchange with the Subic–Clark–Tarlac Expressway in Mabalacat, Pampanga.

=== Subic–Clark–Tarlac Expressway ===
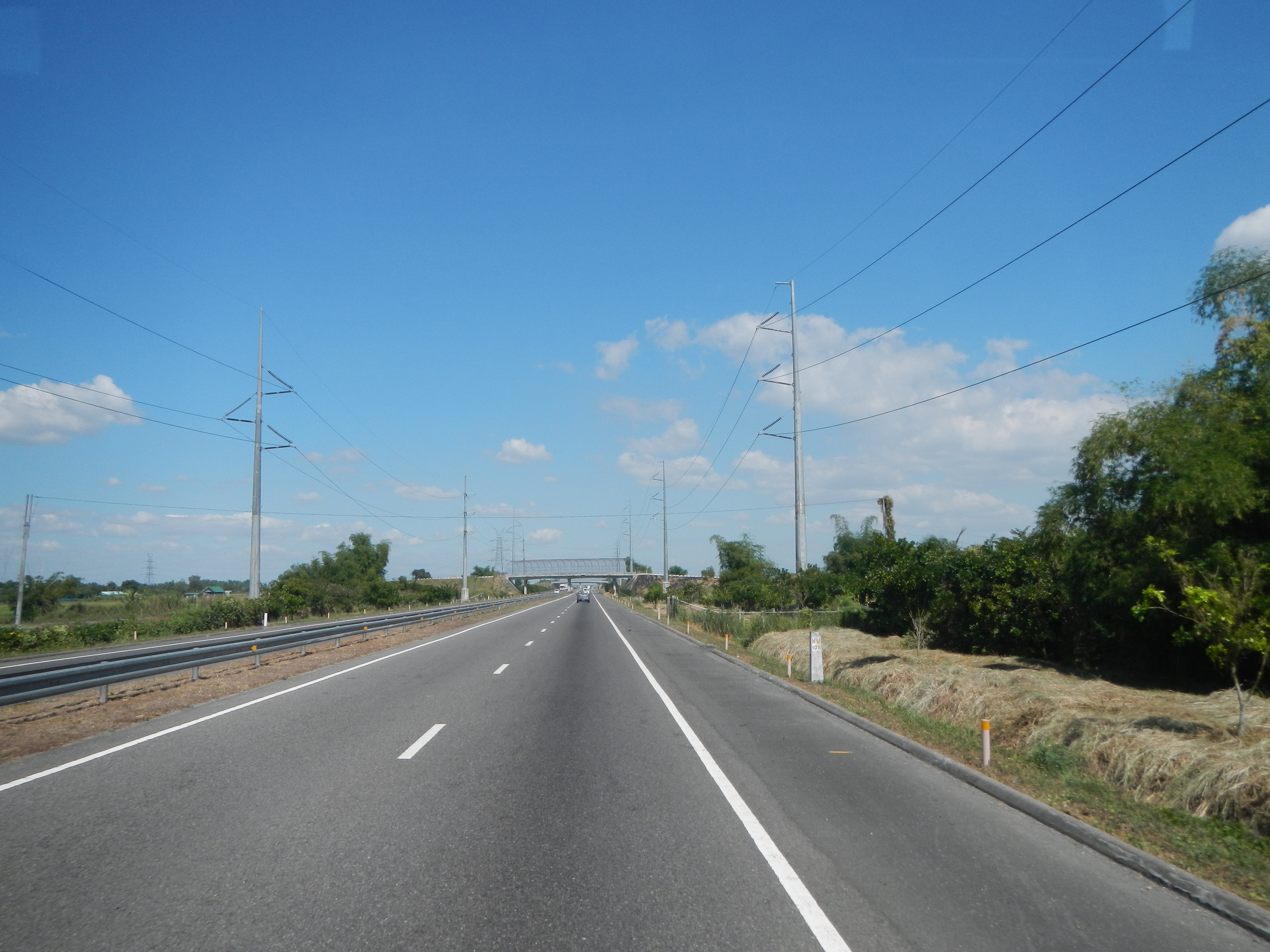
Subic–Clark–Tarlac Expressway in Tarlac

NLEX connects to the Subic–Clark–Tarlac Expressway (SCTEX) via Clark Spur Road towards the interchange of SCTEX Main in Mabalacat. SCTEX Main then carries R-8 north towards Tarlac City.

=== Tarlac–Pangasinan–La Union Expressway ===
Between Tarlac City and its northern terminus at Manila North Road and Pugo–Rosario Road in Rosario, R-8 is known as the Tarlac–Pangasinan–La Union Expressway (TPLEX). It links the provinces of Tarlac, Nueva Ecija, Pangasinan, and La Union.

=== R-8 Spur ===
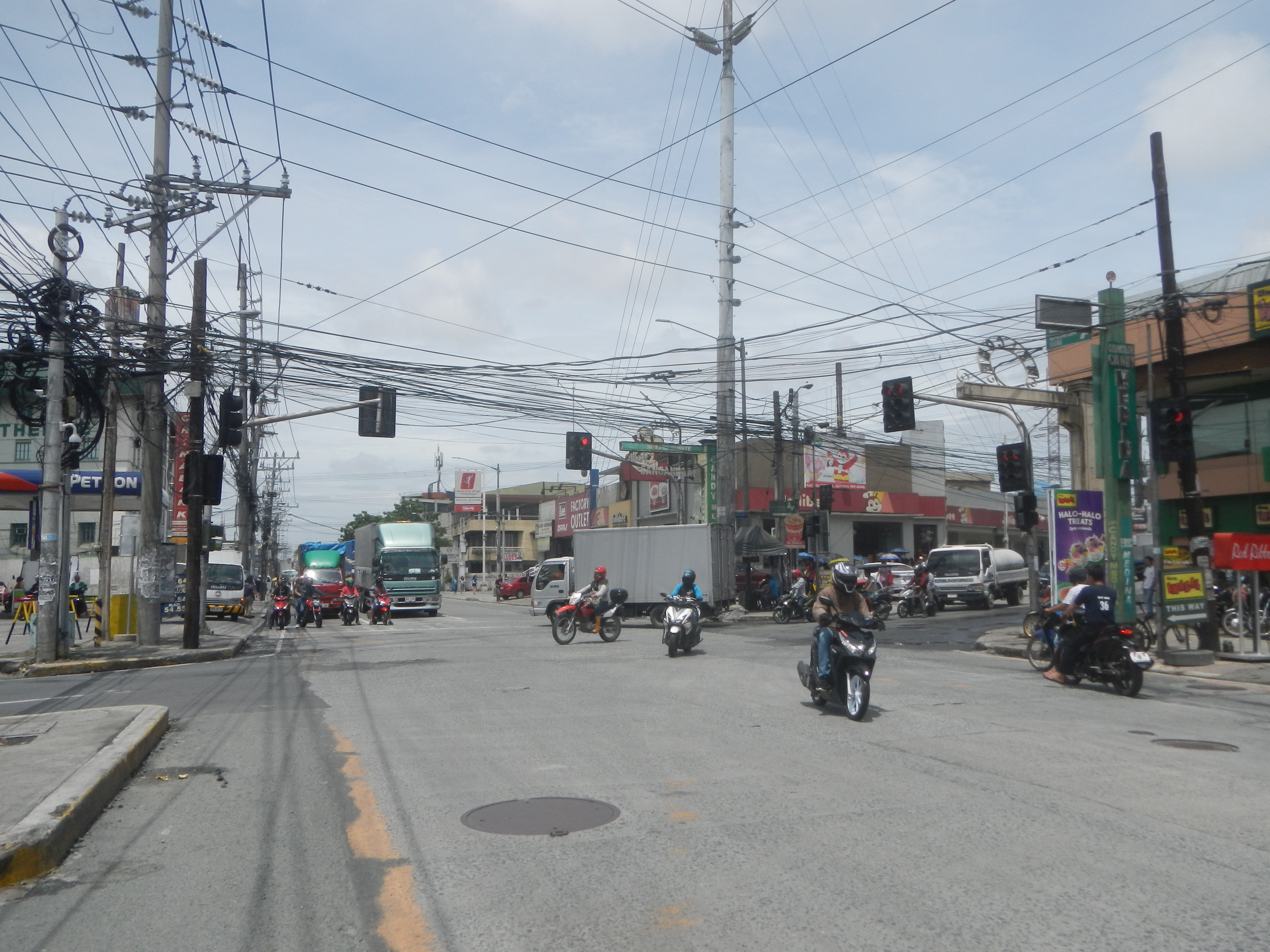
Quirino Highway in Baesa, Quezon City

The segment of Quirino Highway is considered a spur of R-8, branching from the Novaliches Interchange of NLEX (one of the main segments of R-8) to its junction with R-7 at Commonwealth Avenue. This segment is located entirely in Quezon City.

== See also ==
- List of roads in Metro Manila
