= Blumentritt Road =

Road in Manila, Philippines

Coordinates: 14°37′8″N 120°59′53″E

- Blumentritt Street
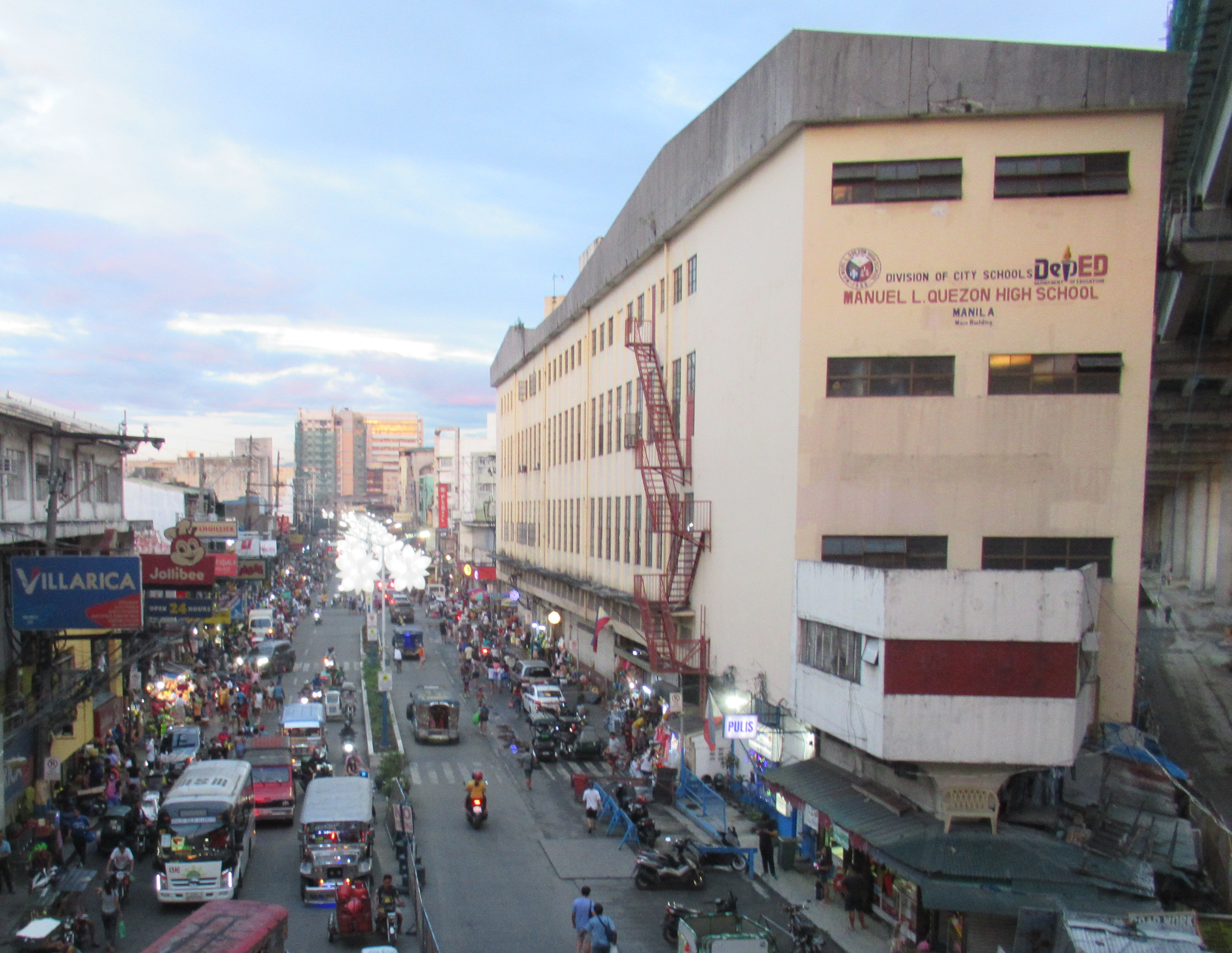
- Blumentritt Road looking northeast from the namesake LRT station in Santa Cruz, Manila
- Interactive map of Blumentritt Road
- Former names: Calle Sangleyes (between Rizal Avenue and Dimasalang Street)
- Part of: N160 from Rizal Avenue to A. Bonifacio Avenue; N161 from A. Bonifacio Avenue to España Boulevard
- Namesake: Ferdinand Blumentritt
- Maintained by: Department of Public Works and Highways - North Manila District Engineering Office (Note: DPWH maintenance excludes its extension)
- Length: 3.5 km (2.2 mi)
- Location: Manila
- West end: N150 (Rizal Avenue) in Santa Cruz
- Major junctions: N162 (Dimasalang Street); N160 (A. Bonifacio Avenue); N170 (España Boulevard)
- East end: G. Tuazon Street in Sampaloc

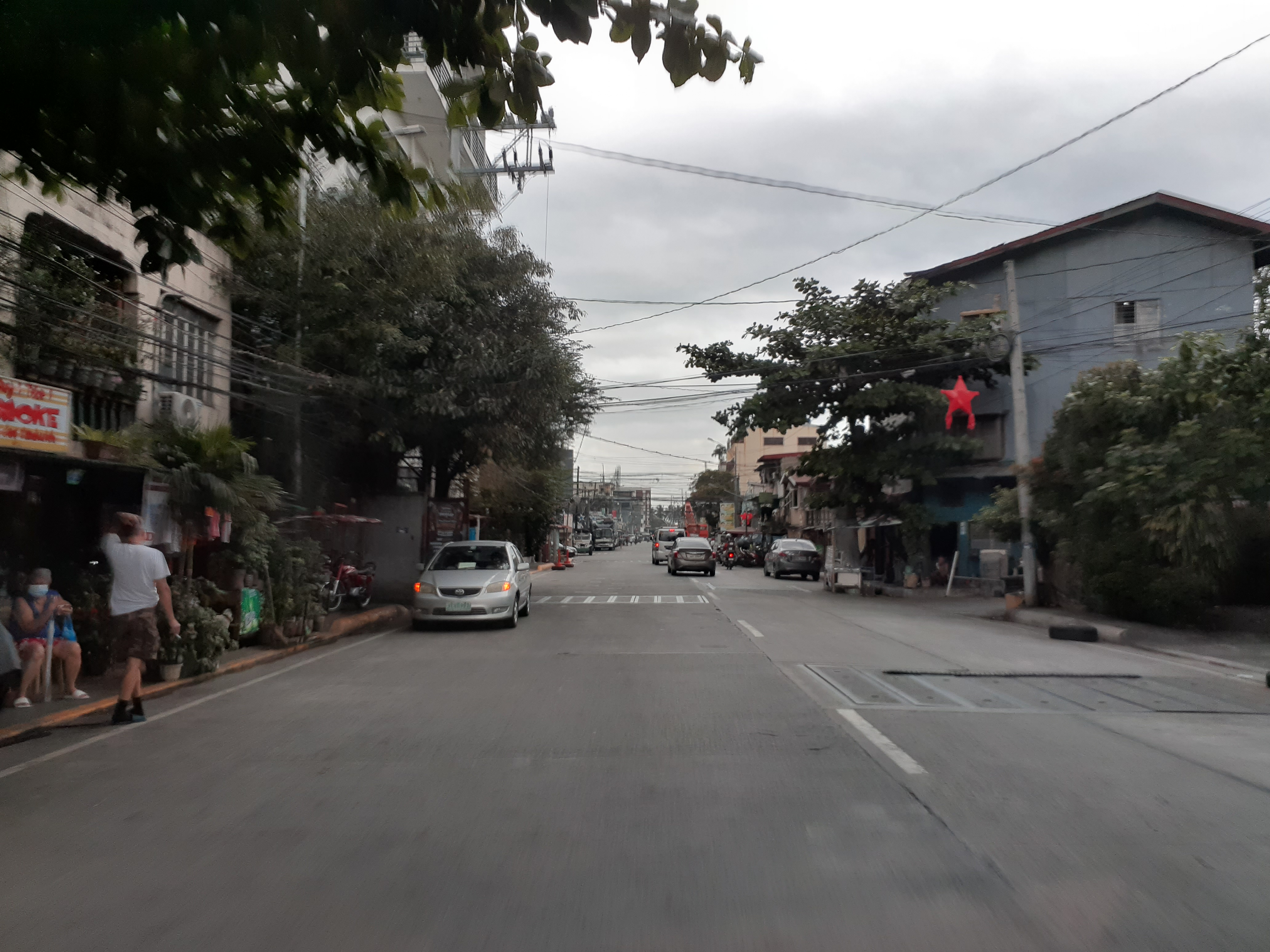
The road looking west towards Retiro Street or N.S. Amoranto Street

Blumentritt Road is a major road in Manila, Philippines. It runs through the border of the City of Manila with Quezon City from Rizal Avenue in Santa Cruz district to G. Tuazon Street in Sampaloc district. The road also forms the southern boundary of the Manila North Cemetery. It is named after Bohemian professor and filipinologist Ferdinand Blumentritt.

The road's original length from Rizal Avenue to Dimasalang Street in Santa Cruz was originally named Calle Sangleyes (Spanish for "Chinese merchants street"), referring to its original residents. It was later extended towards the present-day España Boulevard in the early 20th century as part of the original Rizal Park development in Sampaloc. The portion between Rizal Avenue and the Manila North Cemetery was the street's original section and also a right-of-way of the tranvía until 1945. The road passes through the Chinese General Hospital and Medical Center and the Manila North Green Park before turning southeast in Sampaloc. The road intersects with Dimasalang Street, A. Bonifacio Avenue, N.S. Amoranto Sr. Avenue, Laon Laan Road, and España Boulevard before terminating at G. Tuazon Street in Sampaloc, near its boundary with San Isidro (Galas), Quezon City. It is served by the Blumentritt LRT station and Blumentritt PNR station at Rizal Avenue.

The section of the road between Rizal Avenue and A. Bonifacio Avenue is a component of National Route 160 (N160), while the section between A. Bonifacio Avenue and España Boulevard is designated National Route 161 (N161); both routes are of the Philippine highway network. The remaining section, considered its extension up to G. Tuazon Street, is unnumbered.

In June 2016, a major flood control project on this road was completed.

== Landmarks ==
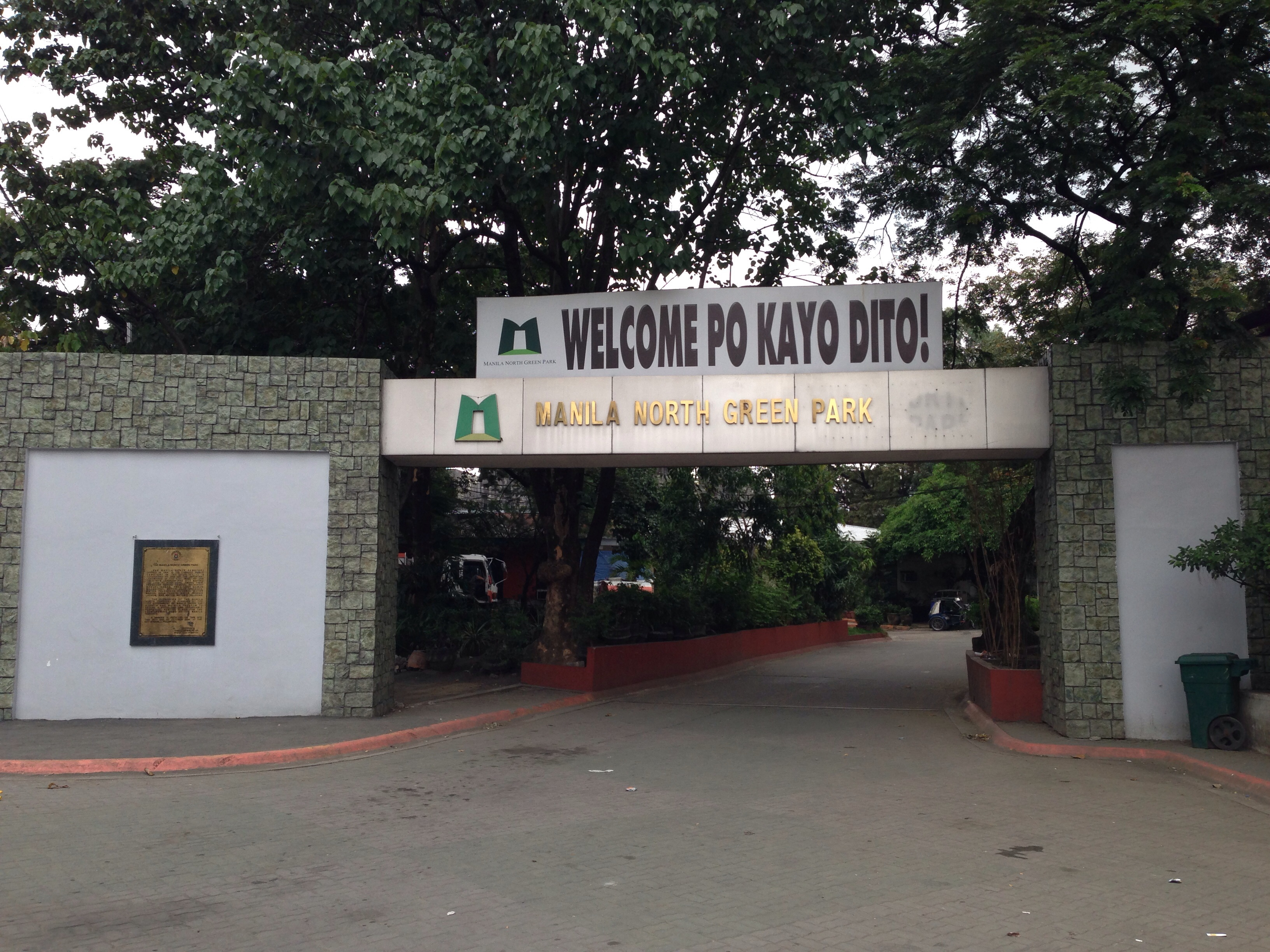
Manila North Green Park

- Blumentritt Market
- Chinese General Hospital and Medical Center
- Chinese General Hospital College of Nursing and Liberal Arts
- Manila North Green Park
- Manuel L. Quezon High School
- San Roque de Manila Church
- SM Savemore Laon Laan
- Talipapa Market
- Viron Transit

== Intersections ==
Province	City/Municipality	km	mi	Destinations	Notes
Manila				N150 (Rizal Avenue), Antipolo Street	Northern terminus. Access to Monumento.
Manila				Maria Natividad Street	Westbound only.
Manila				Oroquieta Street	Unsignaled intersection.
Manila				Manuel Hizon Street	Unsignaled intersection.
Manila				Felix Huertas Street	Unsignaled intersection.
Manila				Sulu Street	Eastbound only.
Manila				Pedro Guevarra Street, Cavite Street	Unsignaled intersection.
Manila				Kalimbas Street	Westbound only.
Manila				Leonor Rivera Street	Unsignaled intersection.
Manila				Andrade Street	Eastbound only.
Manila				Aurora Boulevard, Isagani Street	Traffic light intersection. Eastbound vehicles must turn right to Aurora Boulevard.
Manila				N162 (Dimasalang Street)	One-way road. Westbound vehicles not allowed to enter.
Manila–Quezon City boundary				N160 (Andres Bonifacio Avenue), Calavite Street	End of N160 designation, start of N161 designation. Northbound goes to Balintawak, E1 (NLEX), and Novaliches. No entry towards Calavite Street.
Manila–Quezon City boundary				Norberto S. Amoranto Sr. Avenue (Retiro Street)	Unsignaled intersection. Manila side of the road is one-way.
Manila–Quezon City boundary				Don Manuel Agregado Street (Makiling Street)	Unsignaled intersection.
Manila–Quezon City boundary				Sampaguita Street	Unsignaled intersection.
Manila–Quezon City boundary				Calamba Street	Unsignaled intersection.
Manila–Quezon City boundary				Simoun Street	Unsignaled intersection.
Manila–Quezon City boundary				Maria Clara Street	Unsignaled intersection.
Manila–Quezon City boundary				Nicanor Roxas Street (Laon Laan Street)	Unsignaled intersection. One-way from Manila.
Manila–Quezon City boundary				Dapitan Street	Unsignaled intersection. One-way towards Manila.
Manila				Piy Margal Street	Unsignaled intersection.
Manila				Musa Street	Unsignaled intersection.
Manila				Castanas Street	Unsignaled intersection.
Manila				P. Florentino Street	Unsignaled intersection. One-way road towards Manila. Access to NLEX Connector.
Manila				Ibarra Street	One-way road, no entry from Blumentritt Road.
Manila				N170 (España Boulevard)	Traffic light intersection. Access to Quiapo, University Belt, Welcome Rotonda and Quezon City.
Manila				Ibarra Street	Southbound only.
Manila				Tres Marias Street	Northbound only. Dead end road.
Manila				Remedios Street	Northbound only. Dead end road.
Manila				Mercedes Street	Opposite sides accessible through nearby crossings.
Manila				Marquitos Street	Opposite sides accessible through nearby crossings.
Manila				Susan Street	Opposite sides accessible through nearby crossings.
Manila				Santo Tomas Street	Traffic light intersection. Alternative access to E. Rodriguez Sr. Avenue and N170 (Quezon Avenue).
Manila				Alex Street	Opposite sides accessible through nearby crossings.
Manila				Benny Street	Opposite sides accessible through nearby crossings.
Manila				Jaime Street	Opposite sides accessible through nearby crossings.
Manila				Miguel Street	Opposite sides accessible through nearby crossings.
Manila				Matimyas Street	Unsignaled intersection.
Manila				Santa Clara Street	Northbound only.
Manila				Santa Cruz Street	Northbound only.
Manila				J. Fajardo Street	Unsignaled intersection.
Manila				Malamig Street	Northbound only.
Manila				P. Salita Street, Don Benito Street	Opposite sides accessible through nearby crossings.
Manila				Sobriedad Street	Unsignaled intersection. Alternative access to E. Rodriguez Sr. Avenue and N170 (Quezon Avenue).
Manila				Ilaw ng Nayon Street, San Agustin Street	Opposite sides accessible through nearby crossings.
Manila				San Jose Street	Northbound only.
Manila				Romblon Street	Northbound only.
Manila				Gerardo Tuazon Street, Panay Street	Southern terminus. Access to E. Rodriguez Sr. Avenue and N140 (A.H. Lacson Avenue).
1.000 mi = 1.609 km; 1.000 km = 0.621 mi: Incomplete access; Route transition
