= España Boulevard =

Major boulevard in Manila, Philippines

Coordinates: 14°37′3″N 121°0′4″E

R-7

- Aerial view of España Boulevard (2026)
- Interactive map of España Boulevard
- Former name: Quezon Boulevard
- Namesake: España (Spain in Spanish)
- Length: 2.048 km (1.273 mi)
- Component highways: R-7 R-7; N170
- Northeast end: Welcome Rotonda in Quezon City
- Major junctions: N161 (Blumentritt Road); E2 (NLEX Connector); N140 (Lacson Avenue)
- Southwest end: N170 (Lerma Street) / Nicanor Reyes Street in Sampaloc, Manila

Construction
- Construction start: 1913

España Boulevard (Spanish: Bulevar España) is an eight–lane major thoroughfare in Manila, the capital of the Philippines. It is named after Spain, the country that formerly held the Philippines as a colony for 333 years (1565 until 1898). True to its name, several Spanish names abound on the street. It starts in the east at the Welcome Rotonda near the boundary of Quezon City and Manila and ends in the west with a Y-intersection with Lerma and Nicanor Reyes Streets in Manila.

== History ==
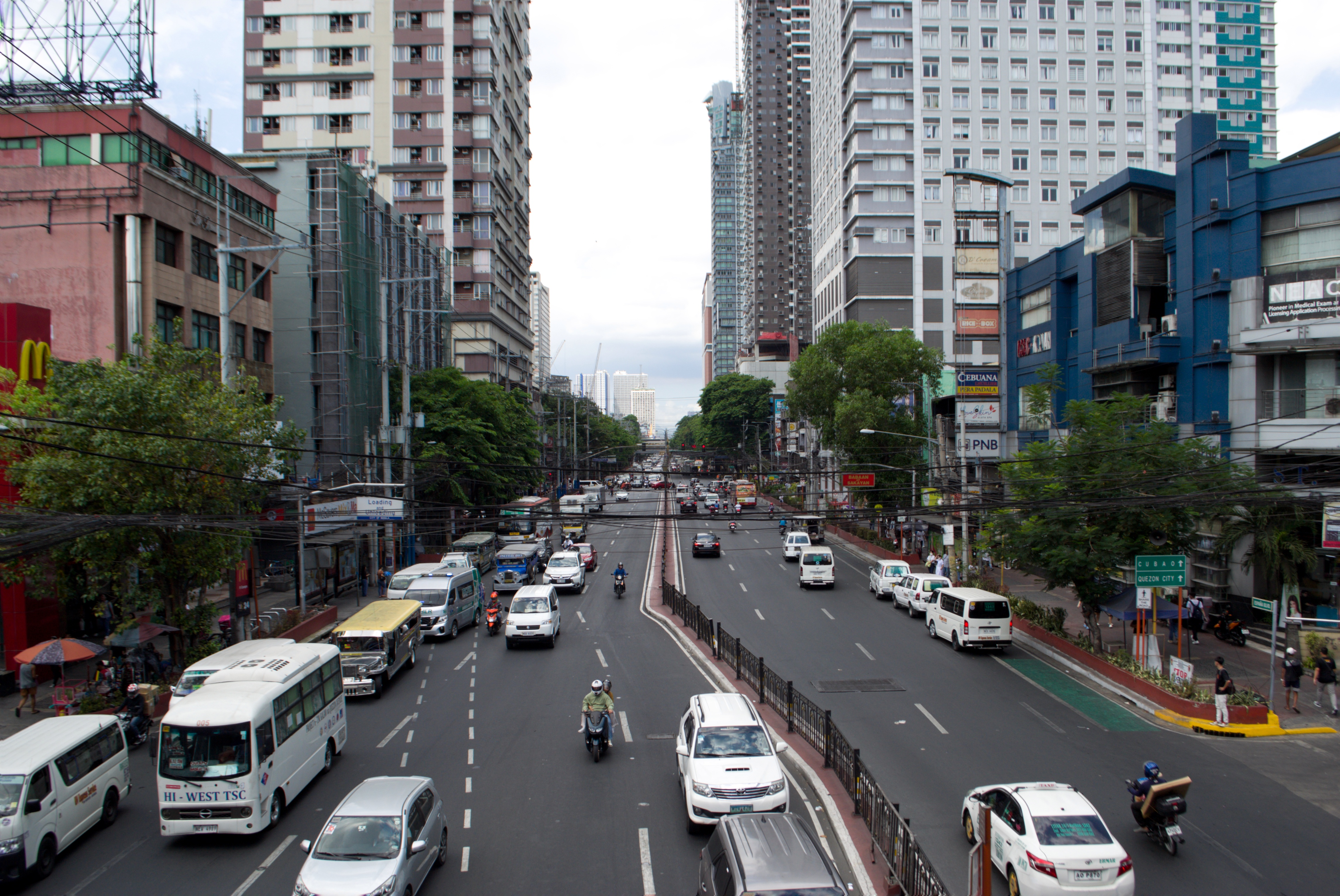
España Boulevard looking north from the Morayta footbridge

Before becoming what it is today, the boulevard was a part of the Hacienda de Sulucan, one of the ten barrios which formed Sampaloc. In 1694, the hacienda was donated to the sisters of the Monasterio de Santa Clara. In 1905, it was turned over to the Sulucan Development Corporation. The road was constructed in 1913 as an access road to Sulucan, under the condition of being named "España".

The boulevard was once part of Quezon Boulevard, and it is part of the national road plan to connect the government center of Manila in Rizal Park to the proposed new capital on the Diliman estate.

España Boulevard is infamous for its floods during the rainy season. This is because it serves as a catch basin for runoff water from higher-elevated Quezon City, as Sampaloc was a swamp marsh area. It is common to find people wading in waist-deep floods, especially when a typhoon passes through Manila, causing class suspensions.

=== Proposed renaming ===
On June 30, 2004, Senator Serge Osmeña filed Senate Bill No. 496, which sought to rename España Boulevard into Lorenzo M. Tañada Avenue, in honor of the former senator. However, the bill remained pending up to the end of the 13th Congress of the Philippines.

=== Proposed rail and bus transit ===
A new mass-transit line has been planned several times to cross España Boulevard, the first one being called LRT Line 4 (the original plan of the current proposal in the 2020s), proposed in 1995 by the French consortium. The said line would traverse the boulevard until it reaches Batasan, then to Novaliches in Quezon City, which has been shelved in favor of the MRT Line 7 line that diverted and cut short the terminus at North Avenue. After the MRT-7 proposal was awarded, the plans were revived to create a separate line for the remainder of the alignment from the original LRT-4 proposal that the MRT-7 left out, which was named MRT-9 that was envisioned to traverse from Lerma to North Avenue. Subsequently, this was again shelved in favor of a bus rapid transit line that traverses from Lerma to UP Diliman, but was again shelved. In 2017, an unsolicited proposal put up by the Philippine National Railways (PNR) and Alloy MTD using the same remaining LRT-4 and bus rapid transit (BRT) alignment with the working project name "PNR East-West Rail" and is believed to be officially numbered Line 8, should the proposal push through. Currently, there are no plans for the elevated railway system.

In 2025, under Bongbong Marcos' leadership, the Secretary of Transportation Vince Dizon announced that España would feature its own busway system, marking the revival of a plan for the BRT route.

== Notable landmarks ==
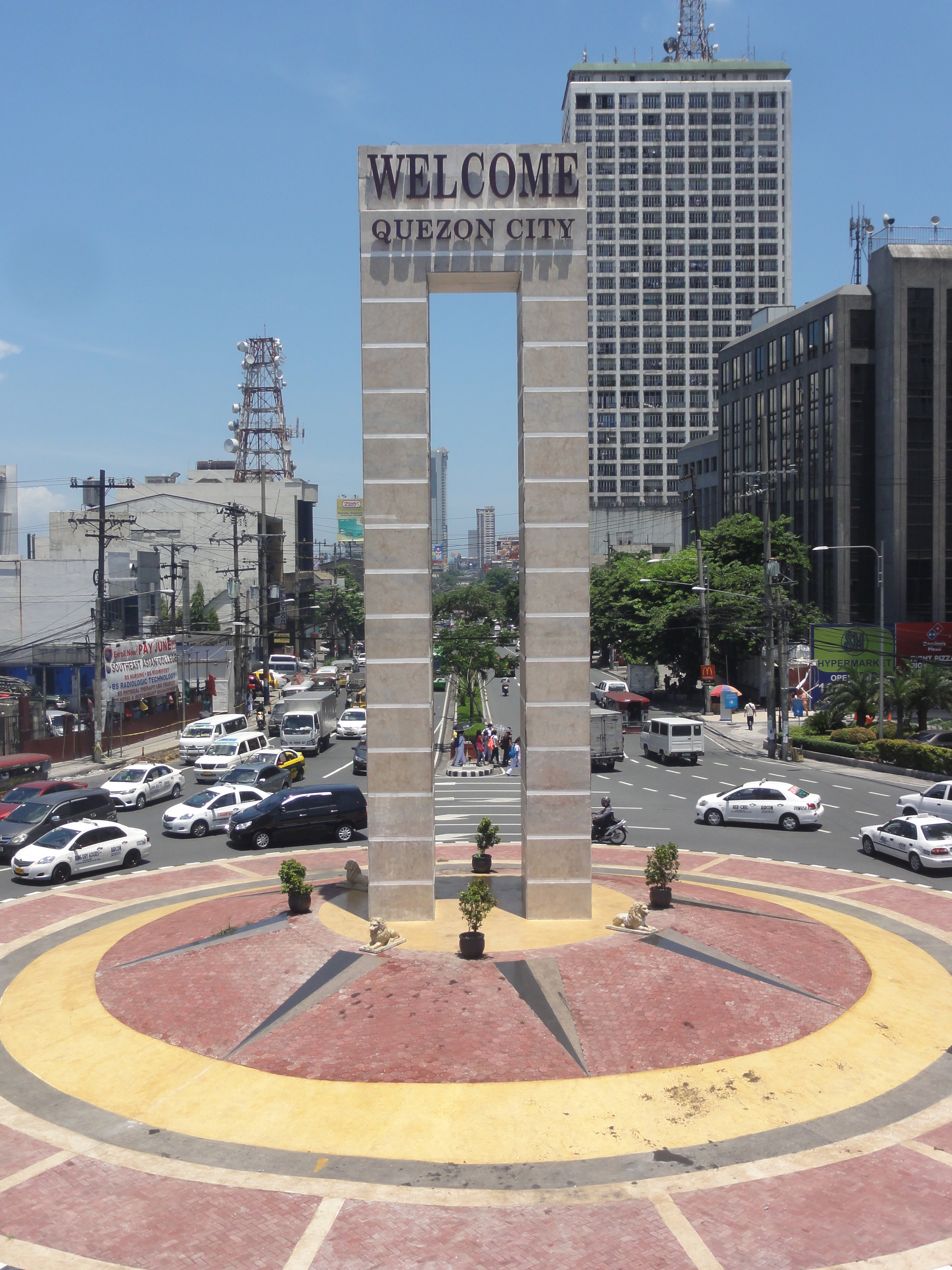
The Welcome Rotonda, also called the Mabuhay Rotonda

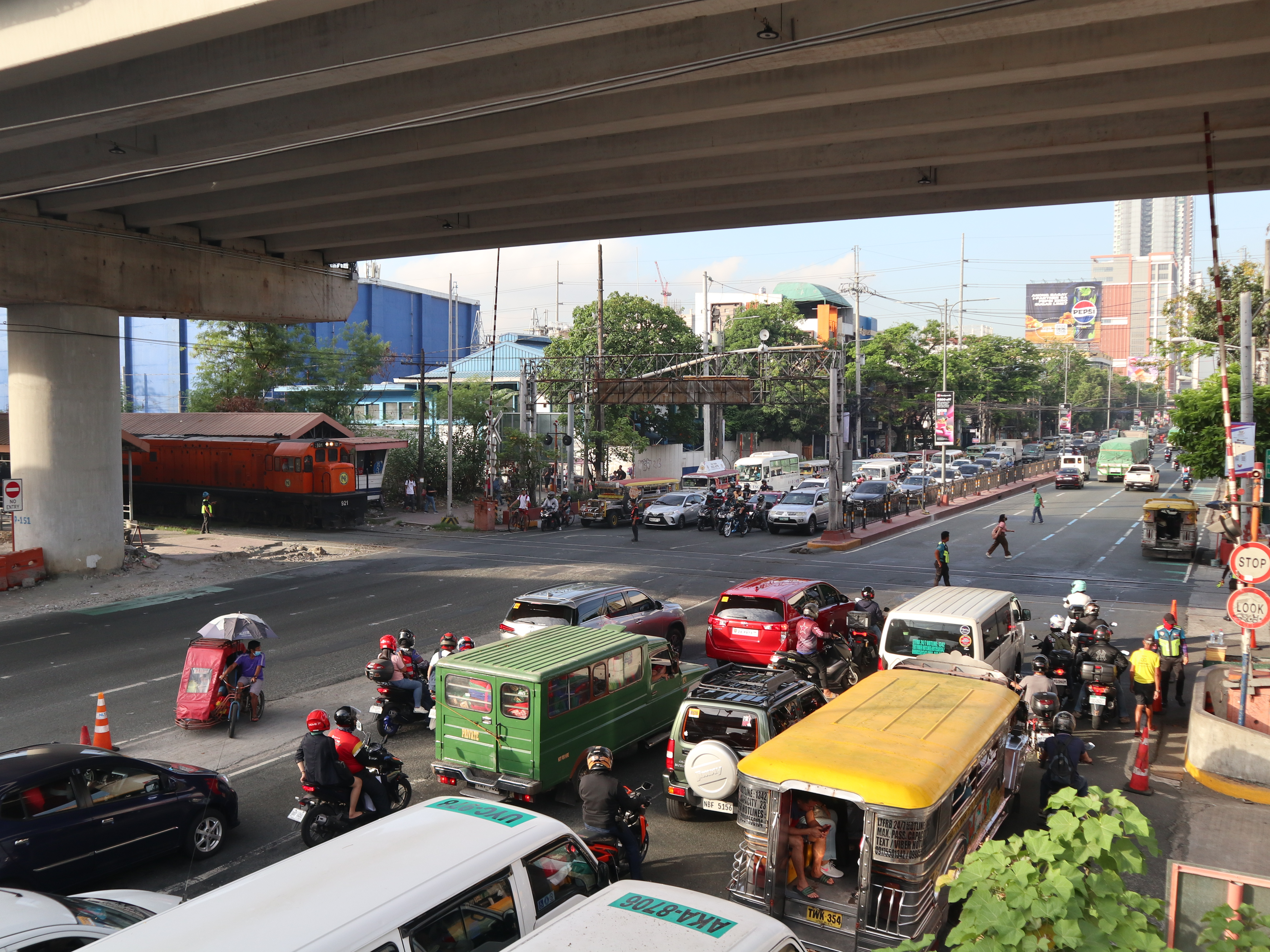
Railroad crossing at España Boulevard, beneath NLEX Connector

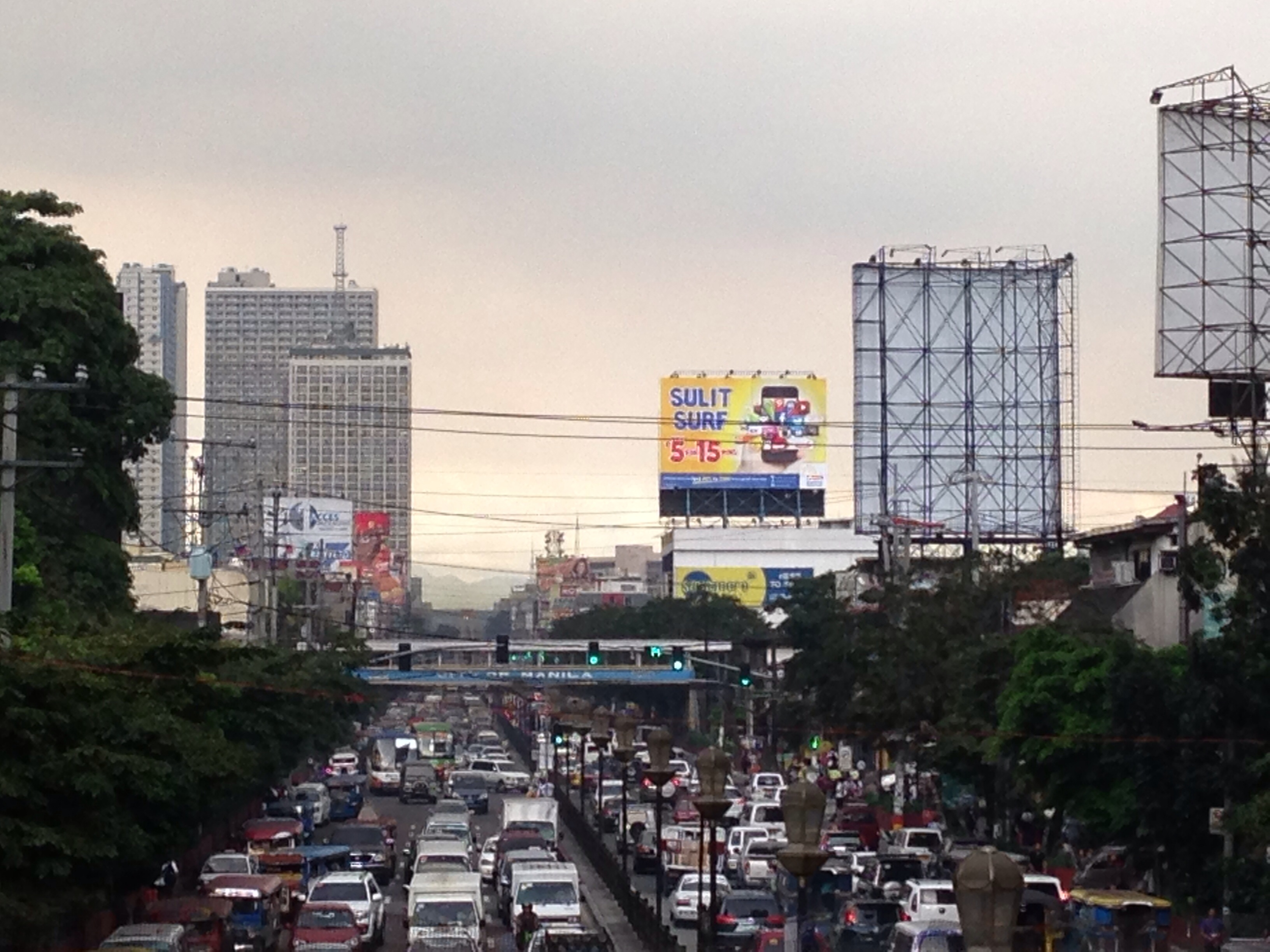
España Boulevard during its usual afternoon rush hour traffic

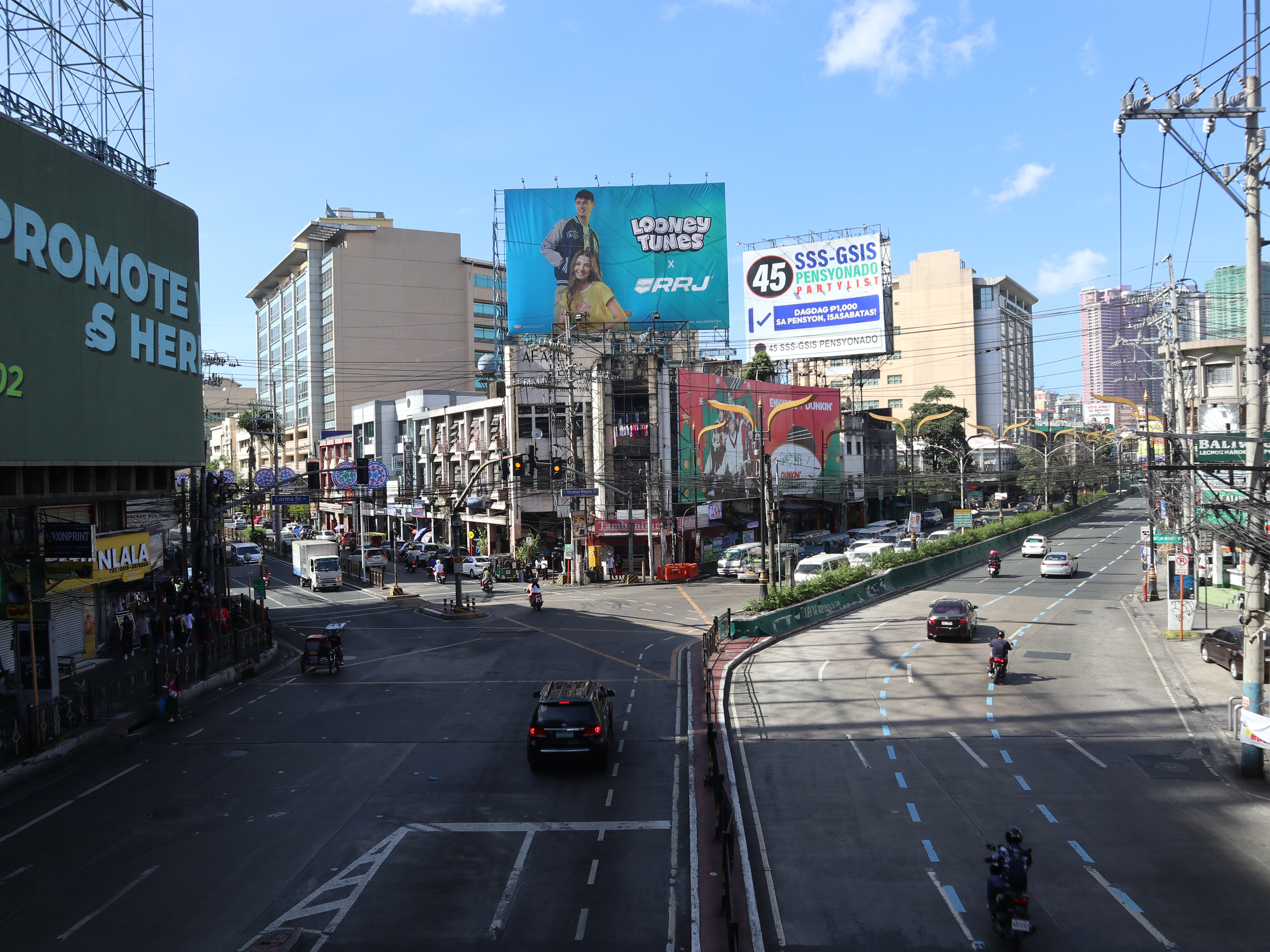
Southwestern terminus of the boulevard, showing Nicanor Reyes Street (left) and Lerma Street (right)

España Boulevard is an east–west artery in Manila. It connects Lerma and Nicanor Reyes (formerly Morayta) streets of Sampaloc district at the west end to the Mabuhay (or Welcome) Rotonda, Quezon City at the east end. The entire street is straddled by a center island, only broken at major intersections and the railroad crossing. Vehicles can make a left-turn only on two intersections: southward to Lacson Avenue and at the western terminus to Nicanor Reyes Street. España Boulevard is 2 kilometers (1.2 mi) long.

España Boulevard's north side is westbound (Manila-bound), while the south side is eastbound (Quezon City-bound). Buses, taxis, jeepneys, cabriolets, and UV Express vehicles serve commuters.

=== Quezon City ===
At the eastern terminus is the Welcome Rotonda, also called the Mabuhay Rotonda, which connects España Boulevard with Quezon Avenue, Eulogio Rodriguez, Sr. Avenue, and Mayon. Quezon Avenue leads to EDSA and ultimately to the Quezon Memorial Circle. E. Rodriguez, Sr. Avenue leads to the Cubao district of Quezon City, a popular shopping place. Mayon leads to A. Bonifacio Avenue and ultimately to the North Luzon Expressway.

=== Manila ===
The first major intersection is Blumentritt Road. The Philippine National Railways tracks cross the boulevard between Antipolo and Algeciras streets. The España railway station is also located here. Between Lacson Avenue and Padre Noval Street is the main campus of the University of Santo Tomas.

The house of the longest-serving Mayor of Manila, Ramon Bagatsing, is on Kundiman Street, on the boulevard's north side. Many people used to flock to his residence as it was open to all his constituents, becoming the de facto public service assistance center for Manila's poor and underprivileged. Today, the Bagatsing compound extends to the parallel Craig Street.

The boulevard also provides access to NLEX Connector (formerly NLEX–SLEX Connector Road) via Antipolo Street onto España Exit.

España Boulevard ends at the junction of Nicanor Reyes (formerly called Morayta) and Lerma Streets. Nicanor Reyes Street leads to Claro M. Recto Avenue, while Lerma Street, on the other hand, leads to Quezon Boulevard.

== Notable events ==
On August 31, 1983, Marcos opposition figure and former senator Benigno Aquino Jr.'s funeral procession passed through España on its way to Manila Memorial Park in Parañaque from Santo Domingo Church in Quezon City. It was joined by millions of Filipinos. Fernando Poe, Jr.'s funeral procession also passed through España on its way to Manila North Cemetery from the same church on December 22, 2004. As many as 3 million people took part in the funeral procession.

España is also frequently used by anti-government protesters as a gathering area due to its proximity to Mendiola, which ends at Malacañang Palace, the presidential residence.

== Intersections ==
Intersections are numbered by kilometer post, with Rizal Park in Manila designated as kilometer zero.

Province	City/Municipality	km	mi	Destinations	Notes
Quezon City				N170 (Quezon Avenue), Mayon Avenue, E. Rodriguez Sr. Avenue, Nicanor Ramirez Street	Welcome Rotonda. Northern terminus. Continues to Elliptical Road as Quezon Avenue.
Manila				Macaraig Street	Westbound only.
Manila				Josefina Street	
Manila				N161 (Blumentritt Road)	Traffic light intersection.
Manila				Sisa Street	
Manila				Instruccion Street	
Manila				Basilio Street	
Manila				Maceda (Washington) Street	Traffic light intersection.
Manila				Metrica Street	
Manila				Craig Street	
Manila				Kundiman Street	
Manila				Eduardo Quintos Sr. Street	
Manila				San Diego Street	
Manila				Antipolo Street	Railroad crossing – PNR España Station. Access to España entry and exit ramps of E2 (NLEX Connector).
Manila				Algeciras Street	Railroad crossing – PNR España Station.
Manila				Prudencio Street	
Manila				Ruperto Cristobal Sr. (Constancia) Street	
Manila				Miguelin Street	
Manila				Vicente G. Cruz (Economia) Street	Traffic light intersection. One-way road.
Manila				J. Marzan Street	
Manila				Manuel Dela Fuente (Trabajo) Street	Traffic light intersection. One-way road.
Manila				Maria Cristina Street	
Manila				Don Quijote Street	
Manila				Carola Street	Eastbound only.
Manila				Dos Castillas Street	
Manila				Earnshaw (Bustillos) Street	Eastbound only.
Manila				N140 (Arsenio H. Lacson Avenue)	Traffic light intersection.
Manila				Valencia Street	Eastbound only.
Manila				Extremadura Street	Eastbound only.
Manila				Cayco Street	Eastbound only.
Manila		4	2.5	Quezon Drive	Westbound only. University of Santo Tomas internal road.
Manila				Mariano Fortunato Jhocson Street	Eastbound only.
Manila				Osmeña Drive	Westbound only. University of Santo Tomas internal road.
Manila				Centro Street	Eastbound only.
Manila				Moret Street	Eastbound only.
Manila				Galicia Street	Eastbound only.
Manila				Padre Noval Street	Traffic light intersection.
Manila				Eloisa Street	Westbound only.
Manila				Tolentino Street	
Manila				Adelina Street	Westbound only.
Manila				Padre Campa Street	
Manila				Paquita Street	Westbound only.
Manila				N170 (Lerma Street), Nicanor Reyes (Morayta) Street	Southern terminus.
1.000 mi = 1.609 km; 1.000 km = 0.621 mi: Incomplete access; Unopened
