= NLEX Connector =

Elevated highway in the Philippines

NLEX Connector
- NLEX Connector Road; NLEX–SLEX Connector Road
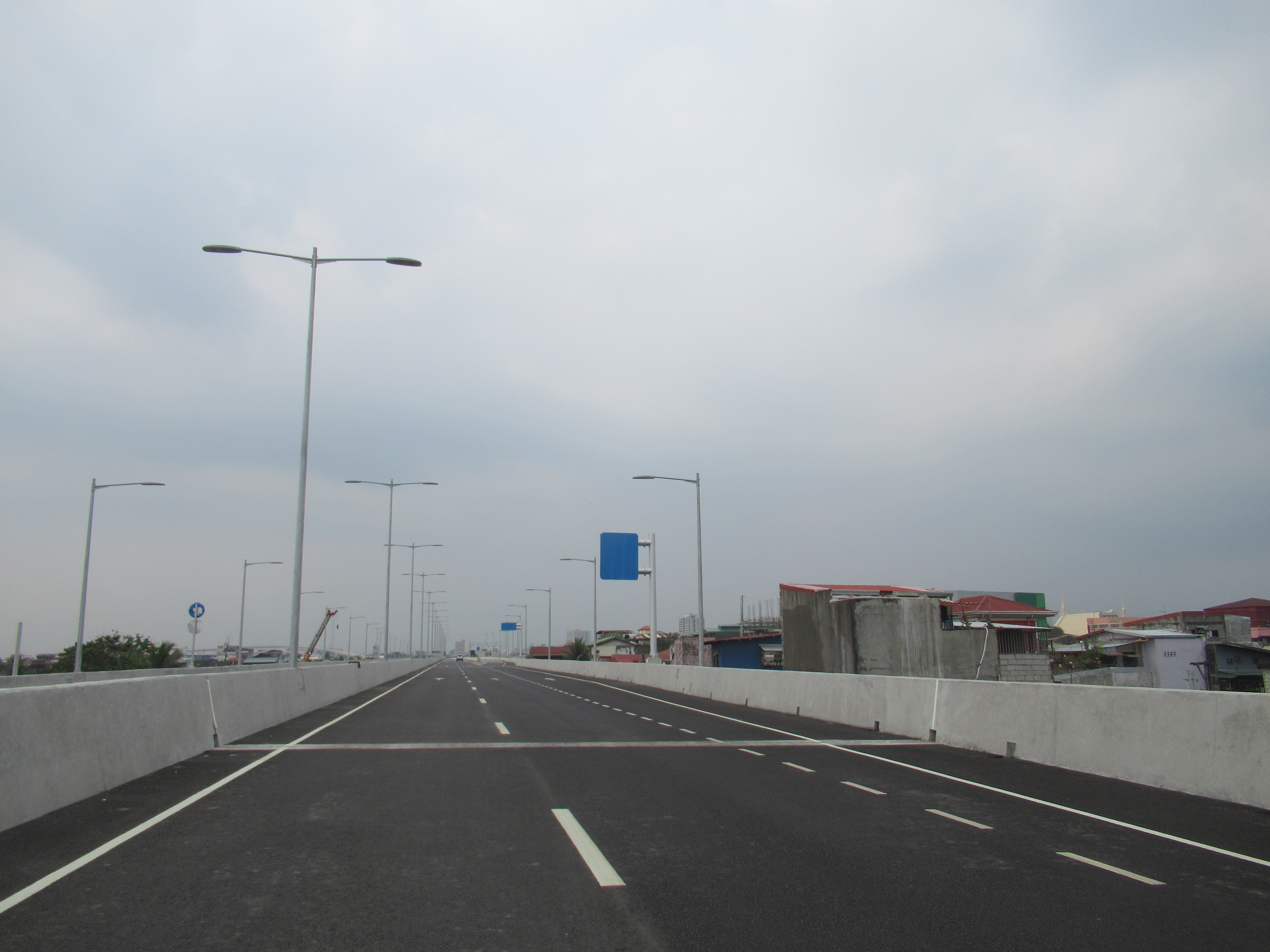
- The expressway northbound towards Caloocan Interchange in Caloocan

Route information
- Maintained by NLEX Corporation
- Length: 7.7 km (Note: The total length of NLEX Connector varies per source. According to the Department of Public Works and Highways, it is 7.7 kilometers (4.8 mi). Meanwhile, NLEX Corporation and various news outlets state that it is 8 kilometers (5.0 mi), the approximated value.) (4.8 mi): Section 1 (Caloocan–España): 5.15 km (3.20 mi); Section 2 (España–Magsaysay): 2.55 km (1.58 mi) (under construction) (Note: The initial 1.8 km (1.1 mi) portion of Section 2 from España to Magsaysay is currently operational, while the remaining 0.75 km (0.47 mi) from Magsaysay to Skyway is currently under construction.)
- Existed: 2023–present
- Component highways: E2
- Restrictions: No motorcycles below 400cc

Major junctions
- North end: E5 (NLEX Harbor Link) in Caloocan
- N180 (Magsaysay Boulevard) in Sampaloc and Santa Mesa, Manila
- South end: E2 (Metro Manila Skyway) in Santa Mesa, Manila

Location
- Country: Philippines
- Regions: Metro Manila
- Major cities: Caloocan and Manila

Highway system
- Roads in the Philippines; Highways; Expressways; List

NLEX Connector (North Luzon Expressway Connector) (Note: During the planning and early construction stages, it is also known as the "NLEX–SLEX Connector Road (North Luzon Expressway–South Luzon Expressway Connector)", "NLEX Connector Road", and "NLEX Segment 11".) is a 7.7-kilometer (4.8 mi), four-lane elevated expressway in Metro Manila, Philippines. It connects the NLEX Harbor Link to the Metro Manila Skyway, which connects further to the North and South Luzon Expressways. The highway traverses parallel to the PNR Metro Commuter Line. It has five interchanges, four of which are currently operational. Alongside NLEX Harbor Link, trucks are allowed to use it.

Construction began in 2019, and the connector was partially opened in March 2023. Its remaining section up to Santa Mesa is under construction and expected to be completed in 2026.

== Route description ==
The 7.70-kilometer (4.78 mi) elevated expressway is divided into two sections: Section 1, spanning 5.15 kilometers (3.20 mi) from Caloocan to España, and Section 2, spanning 2.55 kilometers (1.58 mi) from España to Santa Mesa. The maximum speed limit on the expressway is 80 kilometers per hour (50 mph) for light vehicles, buses, and vans and 60 kilometers per hour (37 mph) for trucks.

=== Caloocan to España ===
The expressway starts at Caloocan Interchange in Caloocan, branching from NLEX Harbor Link Segment 10. It slightly curves to the west as it approaches Manila, crossing streets such as Hermosa Street and Solis Street in Tondo. It then curves east, running parallel to Antipolo Street towards Santa Cruz. It then rises as it passes above the Blumentritt LRT station at Rizal Avenue. It then curves to the southeast, crossing Dimasalang Street, entering Sampaloc, and more streets in the district, including España Boulevard, where Section 1 ends.

=== España to Santa Mesa ===
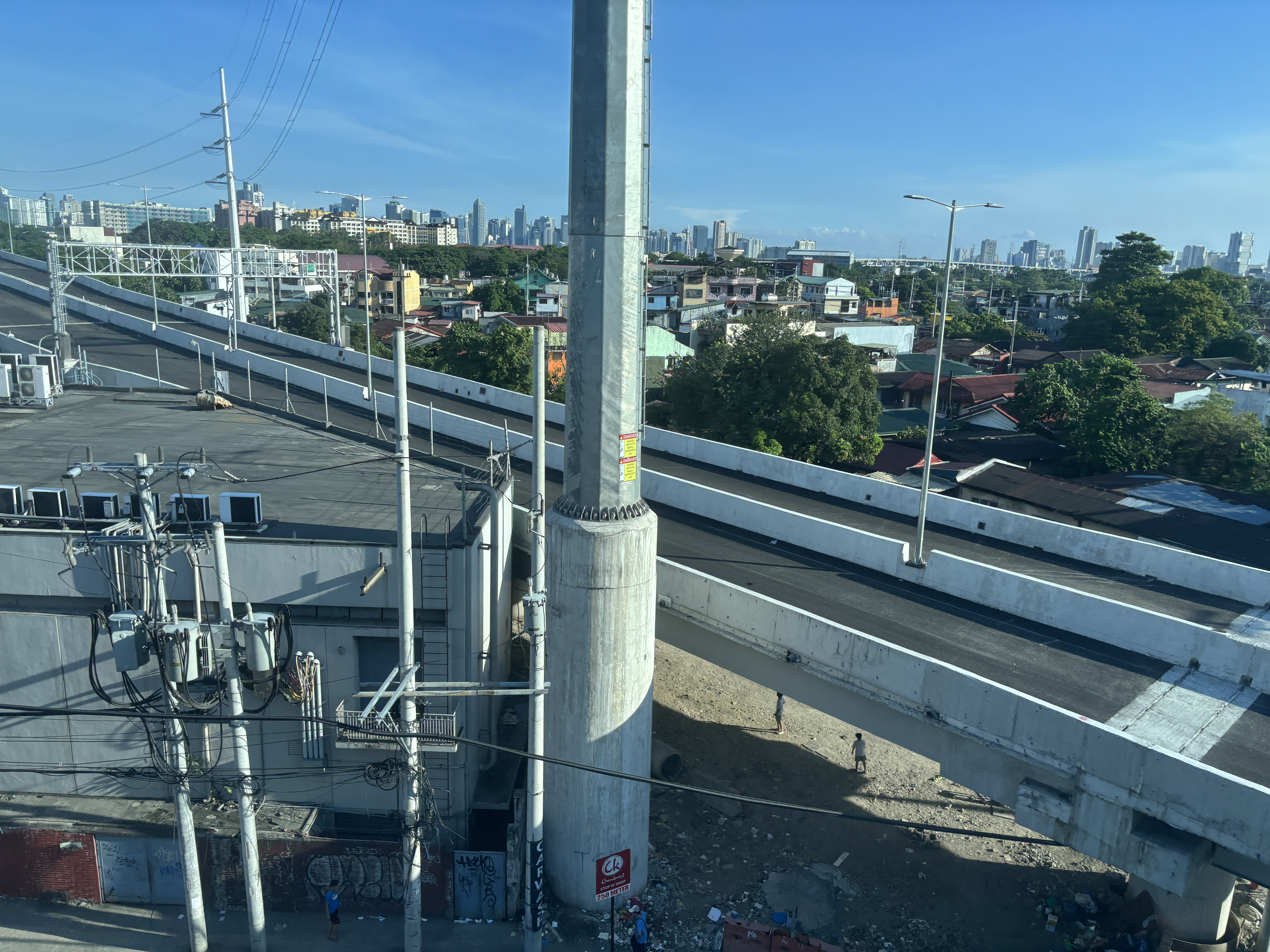
Section 2 progress south of Magsaysay Boulevard (April 2025)

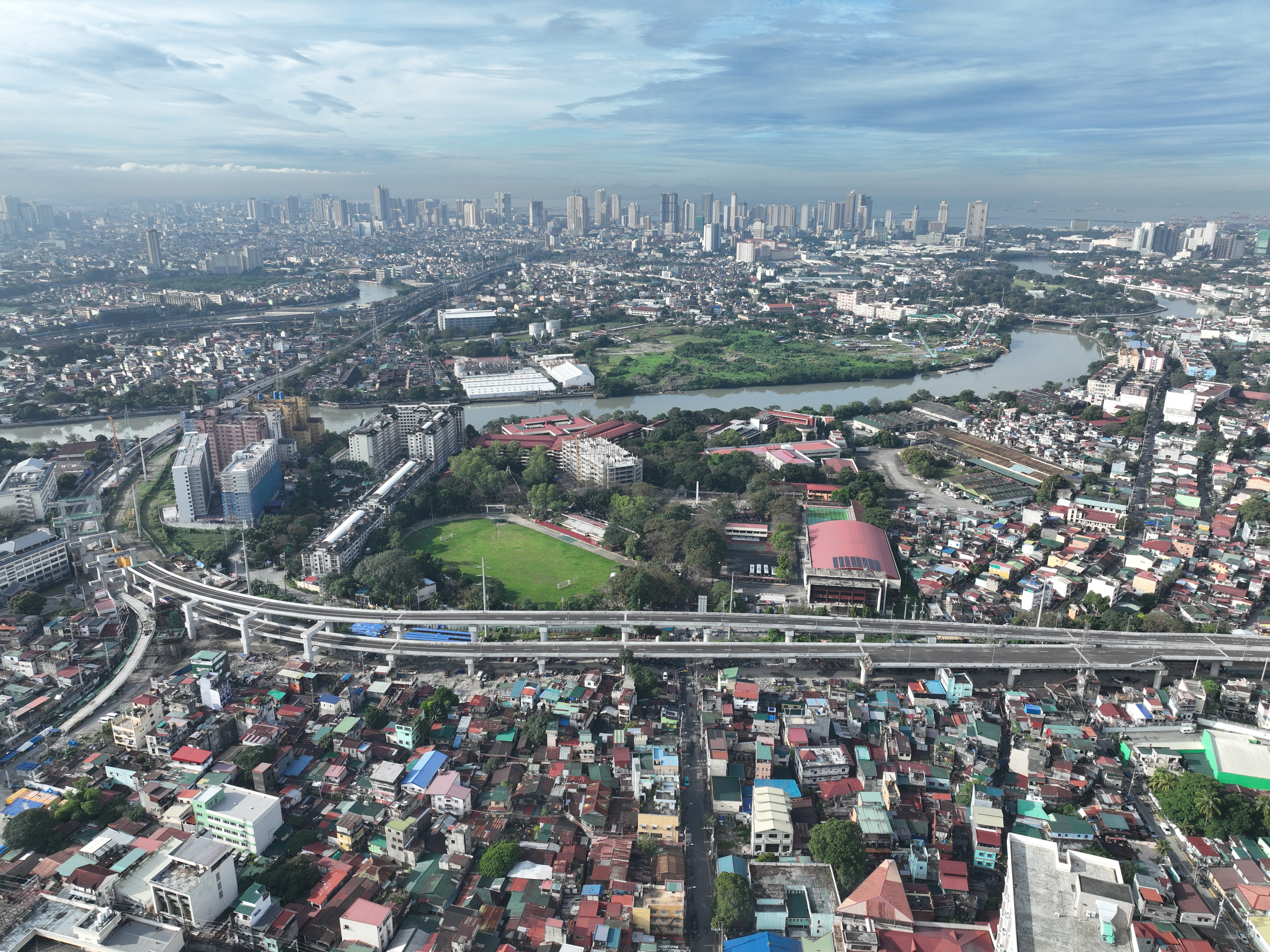
Drone shot of the under-construction southern end of NLEX Connector in Santa Mesa, Manila (January 2026)

Past España, Section 2 commences. It crosses above more streets in Sampaloc. It then curves as it crosses Magsaysay Boulevard, its current southern terminus, and beneath the viaduct of LRTA's Line 2 system. It would terminate near the Polytechnic University of the Philippines campus in Santa Mesa, where it will be continued by the Skyway 3–NLEX Connector link of Skyway Stage 3 towards the Tomas Claudio Interchange in Pandacan.

The original plan of the project was that the alignment would have passed above the Magsaysay Flyover and the LRT Line 2 (LRT-2). However, due to the right of way issues pending on the 1-kilometer (0.62 mi) spur of Skyway Stage 3, the awarding of the construction contract to a Chinese company, and revisions, the alignment would later be modified to include the ramps leading to Magsaysay Boulevard and Santa Mesa. The revisions included the plan for the structures to pass under the LRT-2 viaduct while the Magsaysay Flyover was dismantled during construction.

== History ==
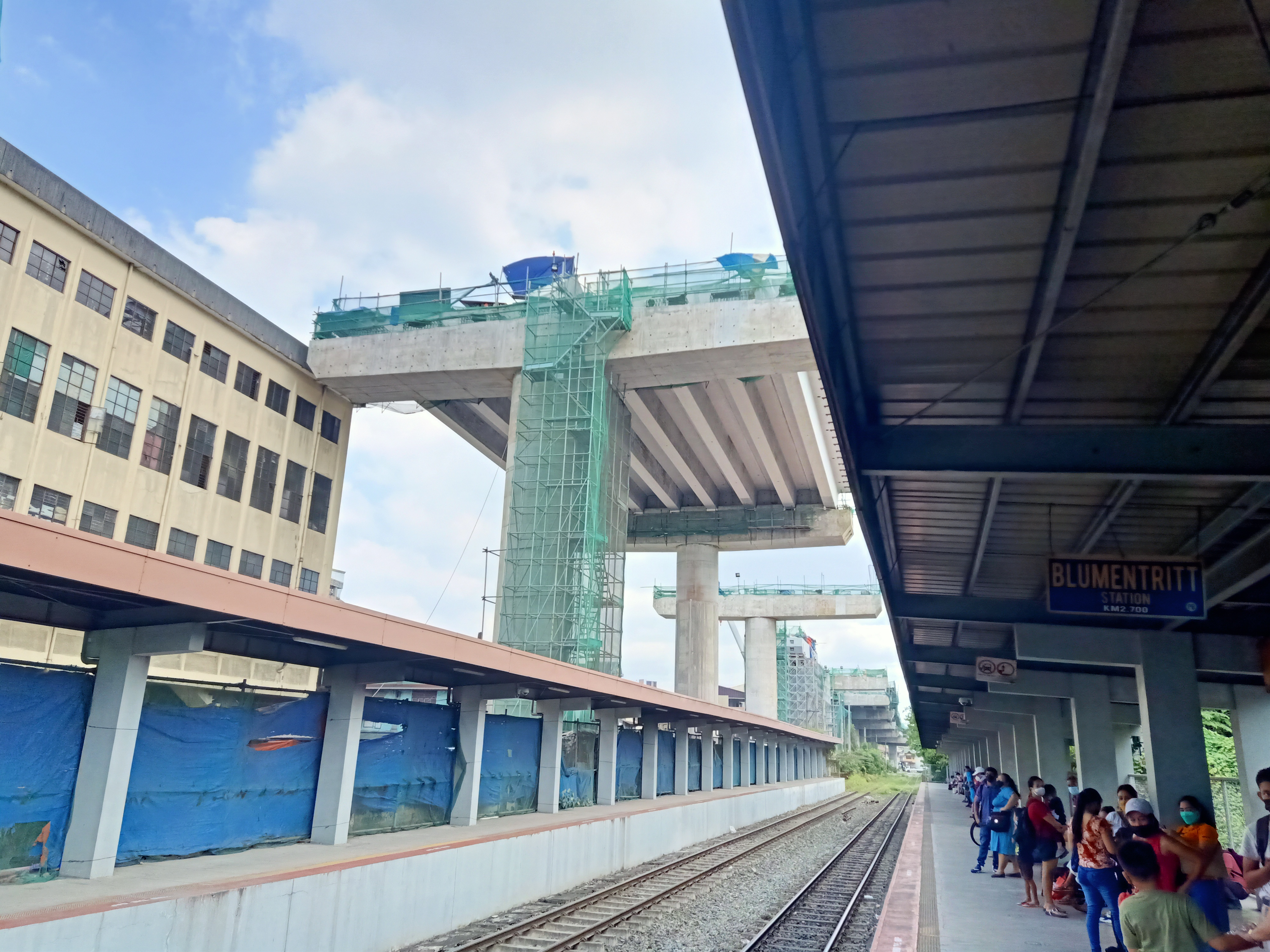
Section 1 under construction near Blumentritt PNR station (March 2022)

There were several plans to make a highway connecting the North Luzon Expressway (NLEX) and South Luzon Expressway (SLEX) made before. As early as 1993, the Japan International Cooperation Agency (JICA) conducted a study on the proposed urban expressway system in Metro Manila, wherein both expressways were planned to be connected through various highways along the Radial Road 3, Circumferential Road 3, and Radial Road 9 alignments. The R-10A alignment that would connect C-3 to Tutuban through the Philippine National Railways right-of-way was also included in the plan.

During the latter part of Gloria Macapagal Arroyo's presidency, Metro Pacific Tollways Development Corporation (MPTDC) later offered an unsolicited proposal to build the highway, also known as the NLEX–SLEX Skyway Connector. The feasibility study conducted by JICA was published in 2011. It was originally to run from Circumferential Road 3 in Caloocan to Gil Puyat Avenue in Makati, with a total length of 13 kilometers (8.1 mi). However, the southern end was later transferred to Santa Mesa, Manila, as the right-of-way of the Santa Mesa–Buendia alignment is held by Skyway Stage 3 of the rival Citra Central Expressway Corporation (now SMC Skyway Stage 3 Corporation).

The National Economic and Development Authority (NEDA) board led by President Benigno Aquino III conditionally approved the proposal in 2012 after delays due to cost issues on its "common alignment;" it was later approved for the first time in 2013.

In January 2014, a joint venture was signed between Metro Pacific and the Philippine National Construction Corporation (PNCC), and the project was still known as Segment 10.2. However, on July 20 of the following year, NEDA-ICC deferred the approval. The project was re-approved on December 16, 2015, as a public-private partnership (PPP) project. The succeeding administration added the project to the Build! Build! Build! Program.

Manila North Tollways Corporation (MNTC, now NLEX Corporation) secured a ₱23.2-billion deal to build, operate, and maintain the highway on July 25, 2016, and was also awarded the concession later on November 23. It is the first PPP project given the go-ahead by the Duterte administration. It was soon known as the NLEX Connector. It is estimated to cost ₱17 billion, but as an "all-elevated" or completely grade-separated structure, right-of-way acquisition shall be reduced to an estimated cost of only ₱2.41 billion. Its construction considers the upcoming parallel construction of the North–South Commuter Railway.

President Rodrigo Duterte presided over the groundbreaking ceremony for the project on February 28, 2019. DMCI undertook the civil works for Section 1, while China Road and Bridge Corporation handled the construction of Section 2. To make way for the planned section, which would traverse below the viaduct of LRTA's Line 2 system, the Magsaysay Flyover along Magsaysay Boulevard was decommissioned in late 2022. The elevated expressway was originally intended to have two interchanges, but during construction, additional ramps in Santa Mesa were included. Section 1 was inaugurated on March 27, 2023, led by President Bongbong Marcos. The expressway was opened toll-free, pending the approval of rates by the Toll Regulatory Board (TRB).

On June 27, 2023, the TRB "provisionally" approved toll rates for Section 1. Toll collection on the expressway later began on August 8.

On October 28, 2023, at 12:01 AM (PHT), the initial 1.8-kilometer (1.1 mi) portion of Section 2 from España to Magsaysay was opened to motorists, ahead of the 2023 barangay and SK elections, All Saints' Day, and All Souls' Day.

== Toll ==
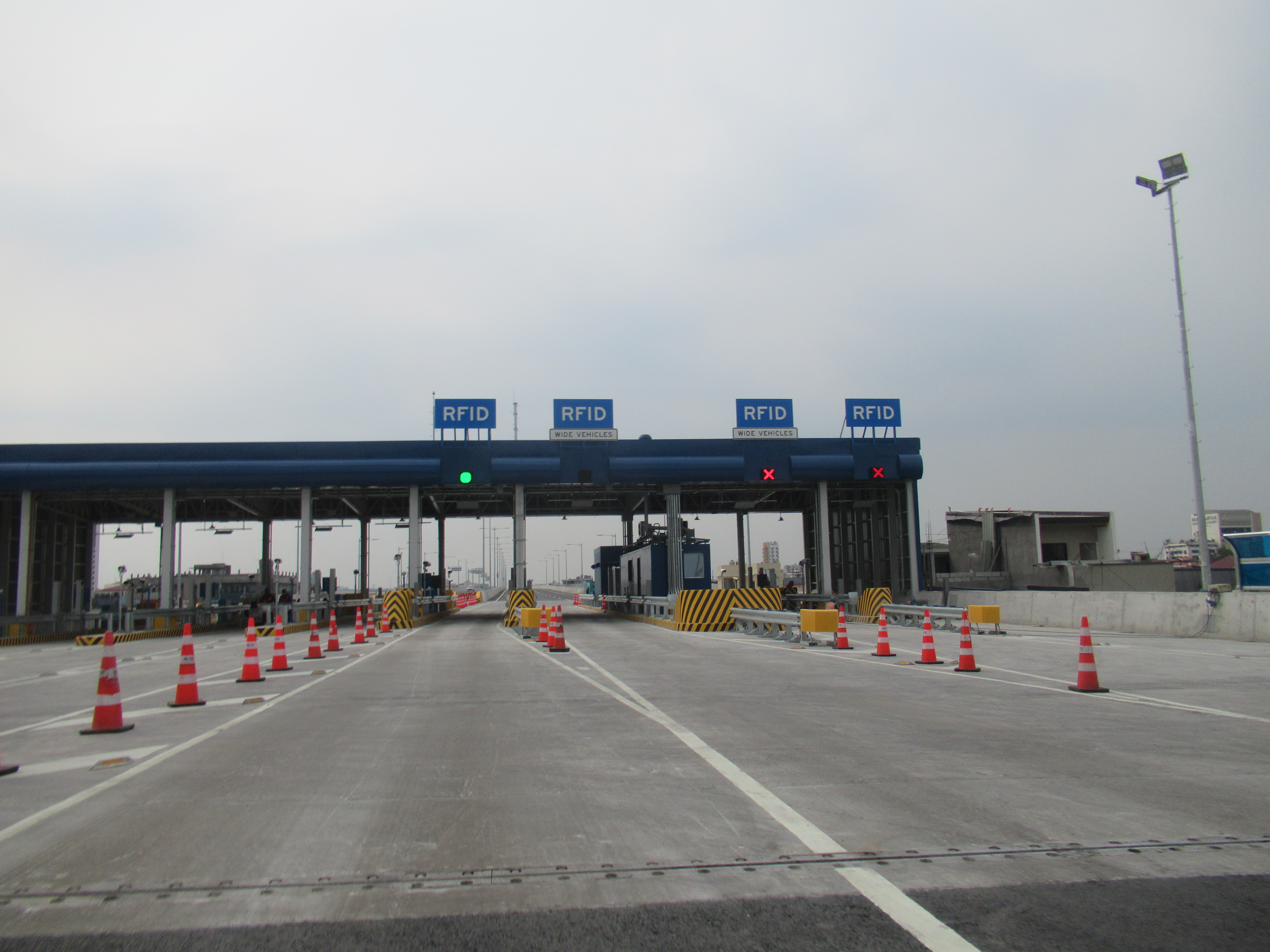
España Toll Plaza

As of August 2023, the NLEX Connector employs a barrier toll system with a fixed toll rate for motorists. Toll fee is collected at the España Toll Plaza, or at the southbound entrance or northbound exit ramps of the adjacent namesake interchange, all in Sampaloc, Manila. Like other NLEX Corporation expressways, Easytrip Services Corporation operates the electronic toll collection (ETC) system that is fully implemented on this expressway, the first in the Philippines.

Tolls are charged based on class; it will eventually be based on distance as well, but it has not been implemented yet until further notice. Under the law, all toll rates include a 12% value-added tax. As of October 15, 2024, the toll rates are as follows:

Class	Toll
Class 1 (Cars, motorcycles, SUVs, Jeepneys)	₱119.00
Class 2 (Buses, light trucks)	₱299.00
Class 3 (Heavy trucks)	₱418.00

== Exits ==
This entire route is located in Metro Manila. Exits will be numbered by kilometer posts, with Rizal Park in Manila designated as kilometer zero.

Province	City/Municipality	km	mi	Exit	Name	Destinations	Notes
Caloocan					Caloocan Interchange	E5 (NLEX Harbor Link) – Port of Manila, Mindanao Avenue, Tarlac	Directional T interchange; northern terminus; continues north as E5 (NLEX Harbor Link); also connects with the C-3–R-10 section of NLEX Harbor Link
Caloocan					C-3 Road	N130 (C-3 Road) / 4th Avenue – Caloocan	Northbound exit and southbound entrance
Manila				España Toll Plaza			
Manila					España	N170 (España Boulevard) / Antipolo Street / Piy Margal Street / P. Florentino Street / S.H. Loyola Street / Fajardo Street / Laon Laan Street – Sampaloc	Diamond interchange; southbound exit and northbound entrance; southbound entry and northbound exit under construction. Former southern terminus.
Manila					Magsaysay	N180 (Magsaysay Boulevard) – Santa Mesa	Northbound entrance and southbound exit; current southern terminus
Manila					Santa Mesa	E2 (Skyway) – Makati, NAIA, Alabang	Future southern terminus; continues south as Skyway
1.000 mi = 1.609 km; 1.000 km = 0.621 mi: Incomplete access; Tolled; Unopened

== See also ==
- List of expressways in the Philippines
- Media related to NLEX Connector at Wikimedia Commons
