= Metro Manila Skyway =

Elevated expressway in the Philippines

Coordinates: 14°30′23″N 121°2′7″E

Skyway
- Metro Manila Skyway System
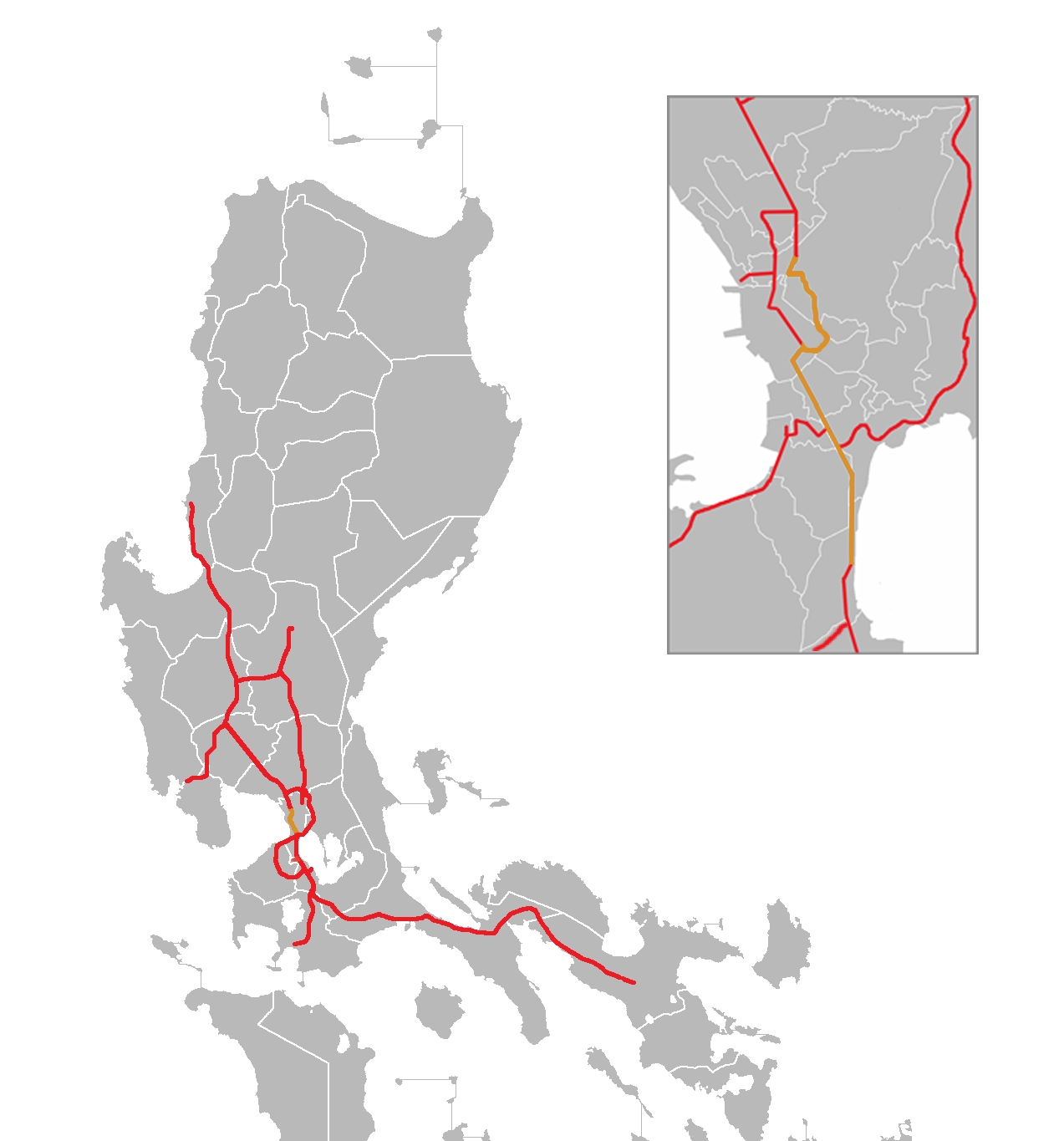
- Map of expressways in Luzon, with the Skyway in orange

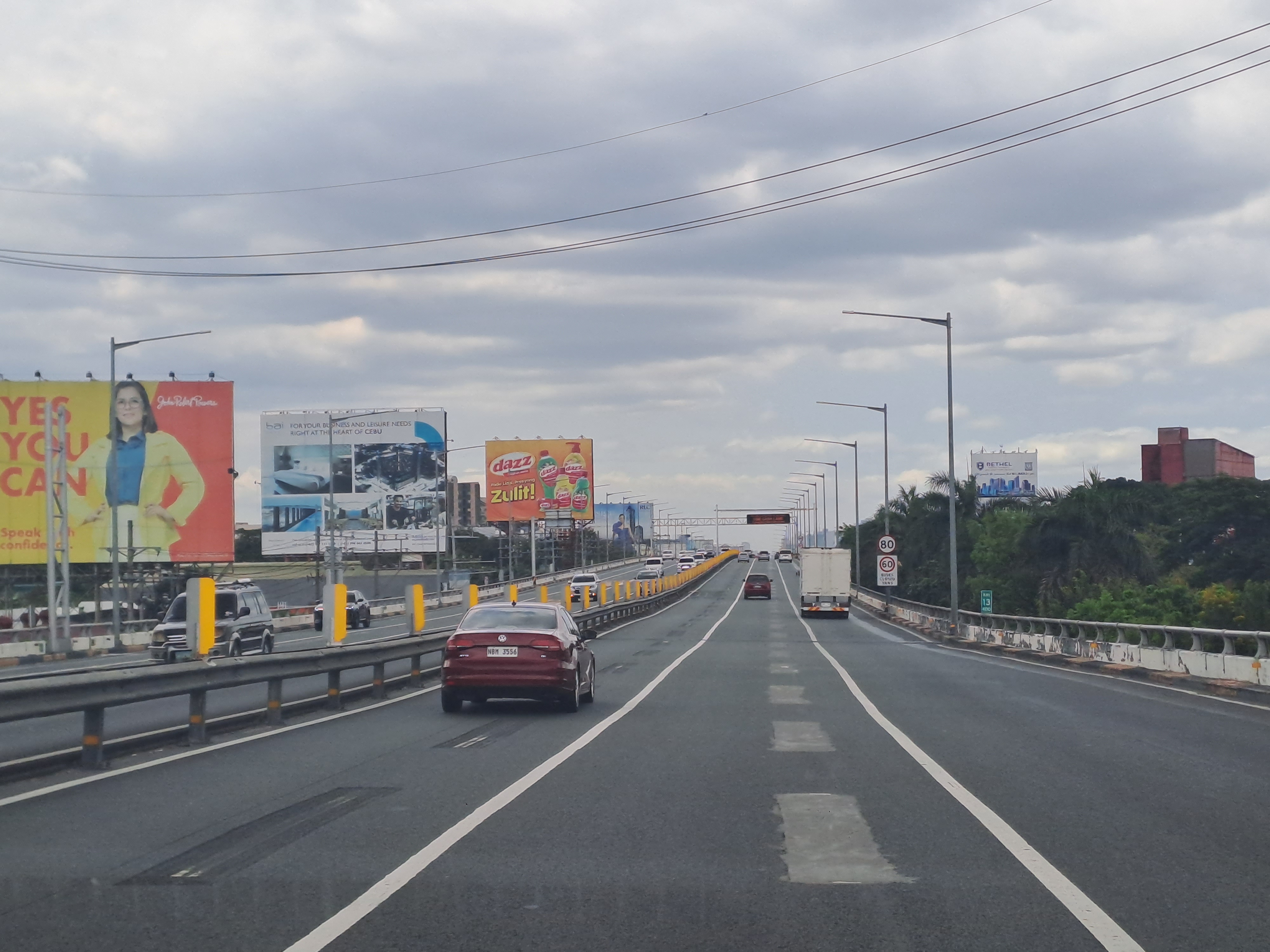
- Skyway near Bicutan Exit in Parañaque

Route information
- Maintained by SMC Skyway Corporation, SMC Skyway Stage 3 Corporation, and Skyway Operations and Maintenance Corporation
- Length: 39.3 km (24.4 mi) Approximate length Stage 1 – 9.3 km (5.8 mi); Stage 2 – 6.86 km (4.26 mi); Stage 3 – 18.83 km (11.70 mi); SLEX Elevated Extension (Note: South Luzon Expressway (SLEX) Elevated Extension is also known as Skyway Extension.) – 4.01 km (2.49 mi) (Note: The northbound section of Skyway/SLEX Elevated Extension is 4.01 kilometers (2.49 mi) long, while the southbound section is 3.71 kilometers (2.31 mi) long. Thus, the entire Skyway/SLEX Elevated Extension is approximately 4 kilometers (2.5 mi) long.)
- Existed: 1998–present
- Component highways: E2; AH26 from Makati to Muntinlupa (Note: The extent of E2/AH26 on Skyway is unknown since the DPWH's GIS apps do not show any route designation for the tollway. Despite this, some E2/AH26 markers were seen between Buendia, Makati, and Alabang, Muntinlupa, until they were dismantled together with the center barriers in 2020.)
- Restrictions: No motorcycles below 400cc, trucks, modified 4 or 6-wheeler closed vans

Major junctions
- North end: AH26 (North Luzon Expressway) in Caloocan (Note: San Miguel Corporation, the Department of Public Works and Highways, and various news outlets consider the northern terminus of Skyway at Balintawak as part of Quezon City even after the addition of Section 5. However, various maps show that it is located in Caloocan.)
- E6 (NAIA Expressway) in Taguig
- South end: AH26 (South Luzon Expressway) in Muntinlupa

Location
- Country: Philippines
- Regions: Metro Manila
- Major cities: Caloocan, Makati, Malabon, Mandaluyong, Manila, Muntinlupa, Parañaque, Pasay, Quezon City, San Juan, Taguig

Highway system
- Roads in the Philippines; Highways; Expressways; List

The Metro Manila Skyway, officially the Metro Manila Skyway System (MMSS) or simply the Skyway, is an elevated highway serving as the main expressway of Metro Manila, Philippines. It connects the North and South Luzon Expressways (NLEX and SLEX) with access to Ninoy Aquino International Airport via the NAIA Expressway (NAIAX). It is the first fully grade-separated highway in the Philippines, one of the longest elevated highways in the world with a total length of approximately 39.2 kilometers (24.4 mi).

The expressway runs above major existing highways in Metro Manila and the San Juan River. It passes through the highly urbanized areas of Caloocan, Malabon, Quezon City, San Juan, Mandaluyong, Manila, Makati, Pasay, Taguig, Parañaque, and Muntinlupa, easing congestion on other major thoroughfares. The Skyway is accessible to Class 1 vehicles (i.e. cars, vans, motorcycles 400 cc (24 cu in) and above, pick-up trucks, and SUVs), Class 2 vehicles, and public utility vehicles (PUVs). Previously, Class 2 vehicles and PUVs were banned due to the construction of the SLEX Elevated Extension Project in Muntinlupa.

== Route ==
Stage 3 in Quezon City

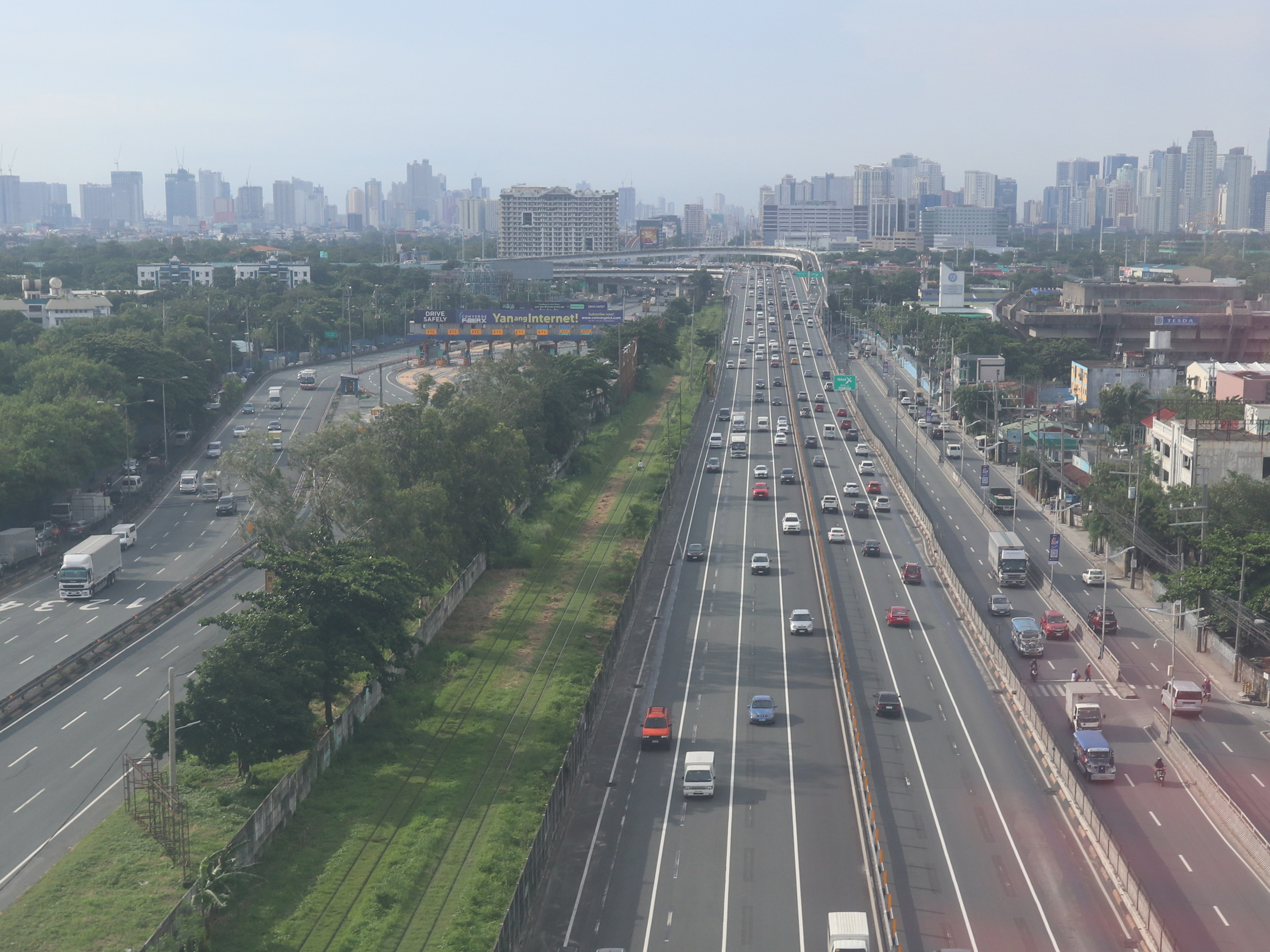
Skyway Elevated (center) with the Skyway At-Grade section of South Luzon Expressway (left) and East Service Road (right) facing towards Sales Interchange

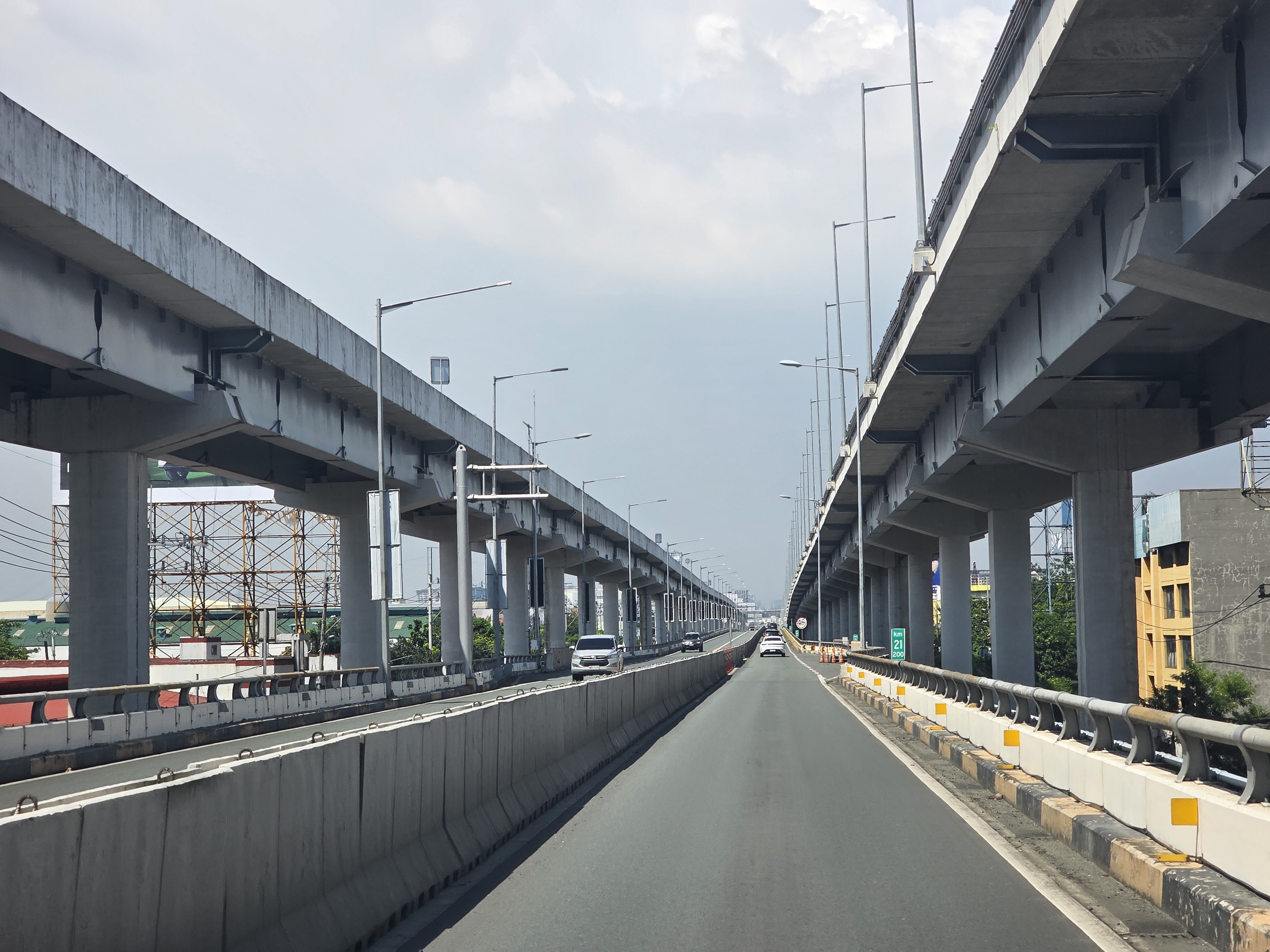
Skyway/SLEX Elevated Extension (above) and the South Station Exit ramp (below)

The Skyway connects the North and South Luzon Expressways. It runs above several major roads in Metro Manila, with strategically located entry and exit ramps. The expressway is divided into four stages, from north to south:

- Stage 3: Balintawak (NLEX) exit in Caloocan to Buendia exit in Makati
- Stage 1: Buendia exit to near Bicutan exit in Parañaque
- Stage 2: Bicutan to South Station (Alabang-Zapote) Exit in Alabang, Muntinlupa
- South Luzon Expressway (SLEX) Elevated Extension: (formerly known as the Skyway Extension and also known as Alabang South Skyway Extension) Skyway Main Line toll plaza to the South Luzon Expressway, both in Muntinlupa

Stages 1 and 2 are collectively known as the South Metro Manila Skyway Project.

From the North Luzon Expressway, the Skyway begins in Libis Baesa, Caloocan, about 1 kilometer (0.62 mi) south of the Balintawak toll plaza. A possible connection to a future toll road to New Manila International Airport in Bulacan is at that exit. It enters Quezon City and after rising above the Balintawak Interchange (where it crosses EDSA), it turns east towards Circumferential Road 3 (C-3), particularly Sgt. Rivera and G. Araneta Avenues.

The expressway runs south above Gregorio Araneta Avenue until it reaches the San Juan River. The Skyway follows the river to its mouth at the Pasig River in San Juan, Mandaluyong, and Manila before turning towards the San Miguel Yamamura packaging plant (owned by Skyway concessionaire San Miguel Corporation) in Pandacan. There, it will meet the 1.2-kilometer (0.75 mi) elevated connecting road to the NLEX Connector in Santa Mesa that will branch off parallel to the Philippine National Railways (PNR) right-of-way, which is being redeveloped for the North–South Commuter Railway (NSCR). The main expressway turns east onto Tomas Claudio Street (Paco–Santa Mesa Road) and Nagtahan Link Bridge towards Quirino Avenue (C-2). It then turns towards Osmeña Highway and enters Makati, where the Buendia exit is located.

The expressway rises and again crosses EDSA at the boundary of Osmeña Highway and South Luzon Expressway (SLEX) known as Magallanes Interchange and returns to its original level after crossing the said interchange. After its interchange with NAIAX, it descends to ground level because of height restrictions on structures near Ninoy Aquino International Airport and parallels SLEX and the PNR tracks at the Pasay–Taguig boundary. The Skyway again rises near the C-5 Exit and Arca South, entering Parañaque and returning above SLEX. At the Sucat Exit, the Skyway rises above the east end of Dr. A. Santos Avenue and descends as it approaches the main toll plaza in Cupang, Muntinlupa. After the toll plaza, it meets the SLEX Elevated Extension which connects it to SLEX past the Alabang Viaduct, narrows to three lanes, and curves west before joining Alabang–Zapote Road near South Station in Filinvest City, Alabang. The extension runs parallel to SLEX along the shoulder of the Alabang Viaduct and Manila South Road, crossing the Alabang and Filinvest exits and descending to merge with SLEX near Pleasant Village and Soldiers Hills.

The Metro Manila Skyway has various lane configurations. The Skyway Stage 1 and 2 were originally designed in a symmetric 3x3 lane configuration (3 lanes per direction), which was changed in 2020 to an asymmetric 4x3 lane configuration, with one additional lane in specific parts of the expressway. These segments are also subject to variable maximum speed limits, at 60 km/h (37 mph) and 80 km/h (50 mph).

Number of lanes and maximum speed limits on the Metro Manila Skyway
Segment	Number of lanes			Maximum speed limit	
Segment	NB	SB	Total	Buses and vans	Cars and motorcycles
Balintawak – Sgt. Rivera	2	3	5	60 to 80 km/h (37 to 50 mph) (Note: Effective January 20, 2025; Straight sections will follow an 80 km/h (50 mph) speed limit while curved sections remain at 60 km/h (37 mph).)	60 to 80 km/h (37 to 50 mph)
Sgt. Rivera – Quezon Avenue	3	3	6	60 to 80 km/h (37 to 50 mph)	60 to 80 km/h (37 to 50 mph)
Quezon Avenue – Pandacan	4	3	7	60 to 80 km/h (37 to 50 mph)	60 to 80 km/h (37 to 50 mph)
Pandacan – Quirino Avenue	3	3	6	60 to 80 km/h (37 to 50 mph)	60 to 80 km/h (37 to 50 mph)
Quirino Avenue – Buendia	4	3	7	60 to 80 km/h (37 to 50 mph)	80 km/h (50 mph)
Buendia – Sucat	3	4	7	60 to 80 km/h (37 to 50 mph)	80 km/h (50 mph)
Sucat – Skyway Main Toll Plaza	3	3	6	60 to 80 km/h (37 to 50 mph)	80 km/h (50 mph)
Skyway Main Toll Plaza – SLEX Elevated Extension	3	2	5	60 to 80 km/h (37 to 50 mph)	80 km/h (50 mph)

== History ==
Skyway logo from 1995 to 2017

=== Conceptualization ===
The concept of an elevated expressway system linking the northern and southern corridors of Metro Manila dates back to 1967 during the administration of President Ferdinand Marcos. In October of that year, a committee on Manila elevated expressways, chaired by Highways Commissioner Baltazar Aquino, submitted a strong recommendation to President Marcos for the construction of "elevated streets" to ease the travel woes of commuters between the north and south of Manila. The proposed idea was planned in two phases: the first phase extending from Mabini Bridge in Manila to the Balintawak Interchange in Quezon City, and the second phase stretching from the south end of Mabini Bridge to the Manila South Diversion Road. The project was envisioned to utilize foreign financing and drew on preliminary feasibility studies conducted by a Japanese firm.

A year later, a preliminary study conducted by Nippon Kaigai Consultants Corporation proposed a network consisting of three routes:

- First route (Mabini Expressway): 3.8 kilometers (2.4 mi)
- Second route: 5.5 kilometers (3.4 mi)
- Third route: 3.7 kilometers (2.3 mi)

In the 1973 Urban Transport Study in Manila Metropolitan Area (UTSMMA) conducted by the Overseas Technical Cooperation Agency (OTCA), an extensive high-speed urban expressway network was conceptualized for Metro Manila to alleviate severe traffic congestion along major arterial roads. Instead of a standalone corridor, the study proposed an elevated expressway alignment running directly above EDSA, which was designed to serve as a high-capacity outer ring bypass integrating with radial expressways to channel through-traffic away from the inner city core.

In January 1988, Manila Councilor Jaime de la Rosa proposed a network of elevated highways (skyways) to be constructed over the Philippine National Railways (PNR) tracks, running from one end of the city to the other. Under this proposal, the skyway would utilize the 40-foot (12 m) right of way of the PNR for its railway operations, with PNR officials reportedly amenable to the project. To help recover the massive investments required, government officials considered charging toll fees. This was part of a broader look into elevated highway systems—including separate routes from Nagtahan to Caloocan, and from Vito Cruz to Cubao—aimed at addressing Metro Manila's worsening traffic problems.

=== Development and planning ===
In 1992, the government proposed the idea of building an elevated expressway from Quirino Avenue in Manila to Alabang, Muntinlupa, spanning 20 kilometers (12 mi). This project would have been a build–operate–transfer (BOT) scheme, and at the time of its development, Parañaque Rep. Roilo Golez won the support of many congressmen to make a proposal to relieve congestion on the existing South Luzon Expressway with a segment between Magallanes and Alabang. In December 1992, House Speaker Jose de Venecia Jr. sought to build second-storey highways in Metro Manila to ease traffic congestion. At the same time, President Fidel V. Ramos asked the House Speaker and House Public Works Committee Chairman, Rep. Victor Francisco Ortega (La Union–1st), to pass the solidated five-year Public Works Act before February 1993 to include the proposal of elevated highways in the region.

In 1993, the Japan International Cooperation Agency (JICA) conducted a study on the proposed urban expressway system in Metro Manila. The master plan for the planned network was meant to have 150 kilometers (93 mi) of expressways, including a route on the Radial Road 3 (R-3) alignment from Quirino Avenue to Alabang, with the total length of about 20 kilometers (12 mi). It also included routes on the Quirino Avenue, San Juan River and Circumferential Road 3 (C-3) alignments as the proposed Inner Circumferential Expressway from Adriatico Street in Malate, Manila to Radial Road 10 (R-10) in Navotas, with a length of 17.5 kilometers (10.9 mi) and on the Radial Road 9 (R-9) alignment from C-3 in Quezon City to North Luzon Expressway in Caloocan, with a length of 3.8 kilometers (2.4 mi). In the same year, Metro Manila Skyway was launched.

The agreement was supplemented on February 14, 1994, with a related undertaking by Citra Lamtoro Gung Persada (CITRA). CITRA was to provide a preliminary feasibility study on the Metro Manila Skyways (MMS) project, a system of elevated roadway networks passing through the heart of the Metropolitan Manila area. To accelerate the actual implementation of both the Metro Manila Expressway (MME, also known as the C-6 Road and later known as the Southeast Metro Manila Expressway) and the MMS projects, PNCC and CITRA entered into a second agreement. Through that agreement, CITRA committed to finance and undertake the preparation, updating, and revalidation of previous studies on the construction, operation, and maintenance of the projects.

CITRA, a Jakarta-based investor, owned by Siti Hardiyanti Rukmana (a daughter of Indonesian President Suharto), signed a Supplemental Toll Operation Agreement (STOA) in November 1995 with the Toll Regulatory Board (TRB) as a grantor and the Philippine National Construction Corporation (PNCC) as operator. Negotiations began on October 31, 1994, with a group composed of representatives from the Board of Investments (BOI), the Department of Finance (DOF), AIA Capital as a financial adviser, the Department of Public Works and Highways (DPWH), the TRB, the PNCC, and CITRA. Under the STOA, Citra Metro Manila Tollways Corporation (CMMTC) was mandated to finance, design, and construct Stage 1 of the South Metro Manila Tollway Project (an elevated expressway from Bicutan to Buendia) and rehabilitate the at-grade portion of the South Metro Manila Tollway project from Magallanes to Alabang. The STOA was approved by President Ramos in April 1996.

=== Stage 1 ===
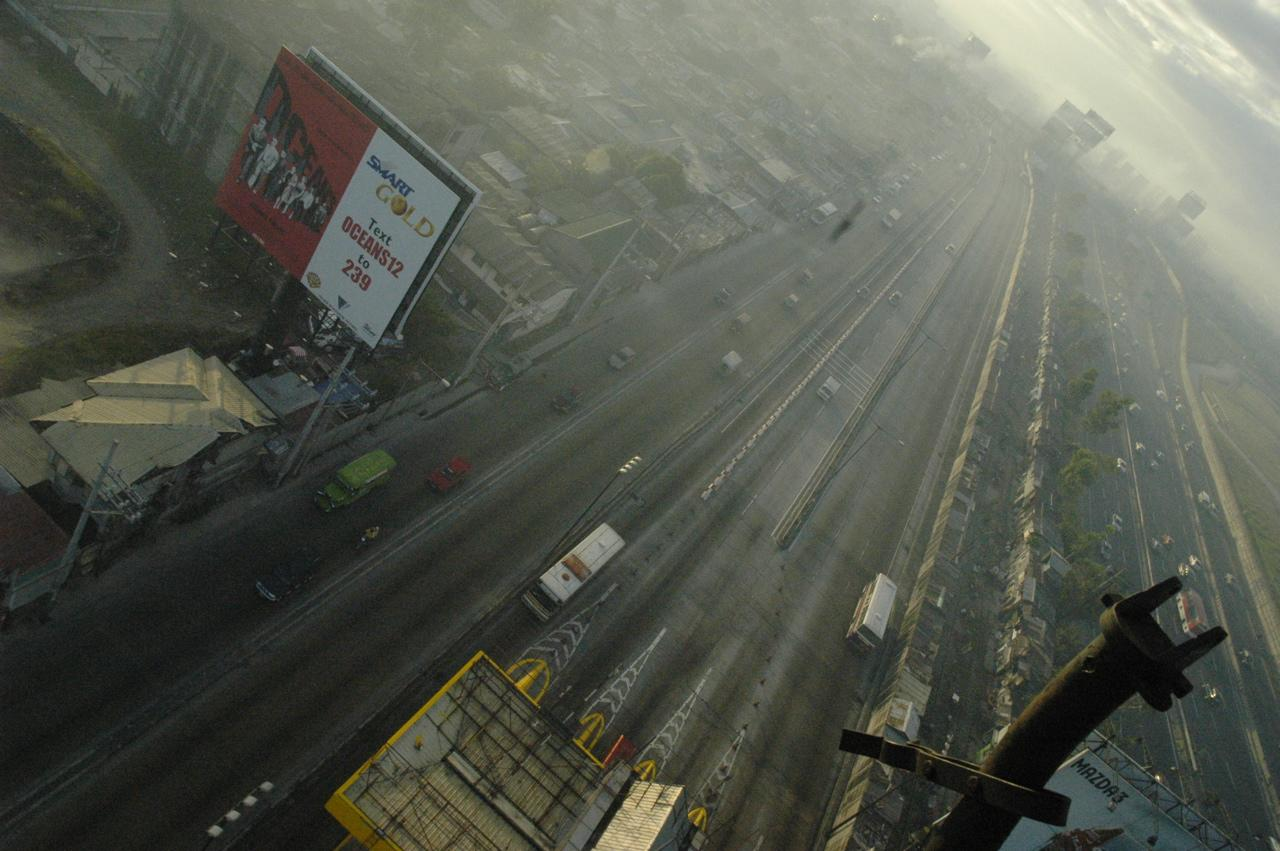
A segment of Skyway Stage 1 (with its at-grade portion at SLEX on the right) circa 2006, with the former Skyway Toll Plaza seen here.

Stage 1 involved the rehabilitation of the 13.43-kilometer (8.35 mi) at-grade portion of South Luzon Expressway from Magallanes to Alabang and the construction of a six-lane, 9.3-kilometer (5.8 mi) elevated expressway above it from Buendia to Bicutan. Construction of Stage 1 began on November 27, 1995, with actual work beginning in the following year. The first pier head rotation was launched by President Ramos in Easter 1996. The girder launching technology was used during the construction. Special girder launchers were used to lift the girders, minimizing the traffic disruption along the South Luzon Expressway. The contact was awarded to a joint venture of Hutama Karya and Taiwanese RSEA.

The Magallanes–Bicutan segment was inaugurated by President Joseph Estrada on December 10, 1998, followed by the Buendia–Magallanes segment. The Magallanes and Bicutan exits, as well as Skyway Toll Plazas A and B, were the first to be completed, followed by the Buendia and Makati (now Amorsolo) exits. The Don Bosco exit started its construction on November 17, 2001, and opened on January 3, 2002, and the construction of NAIA Interchange followed, lasting from March 17, 2004, to its completion on May 30, 2009. CMMTC spent US$32.7 million (₱1.57 billion) on the 9.3-kilometer (5.8 mi) portion of Stage 1.

=== Stage 2 ===
On April 2, 2009, CITRA announced construction of the second stage; by June of that year, new pillars were constructed. The stage was half done by May 2010, rotating the highest pierhead in the Sucat area. On December 15, 2010, the Bicutan–Sucat portion of Stage 2 opened to the public.

Motorists initially used this portion free of charge for one week, when Skyway tolls were reduced to its 2007 rates. On April 6, 2011, the Hillsborough ramps, Skyway Main Line toll plaza, and South Station exit were opened to the public toll-free until April 25. Stage 2 extended the toll road by about 6.86 kilometers (4.26 mi), from Bicutan to Alabang.

=== Stage 3 ===
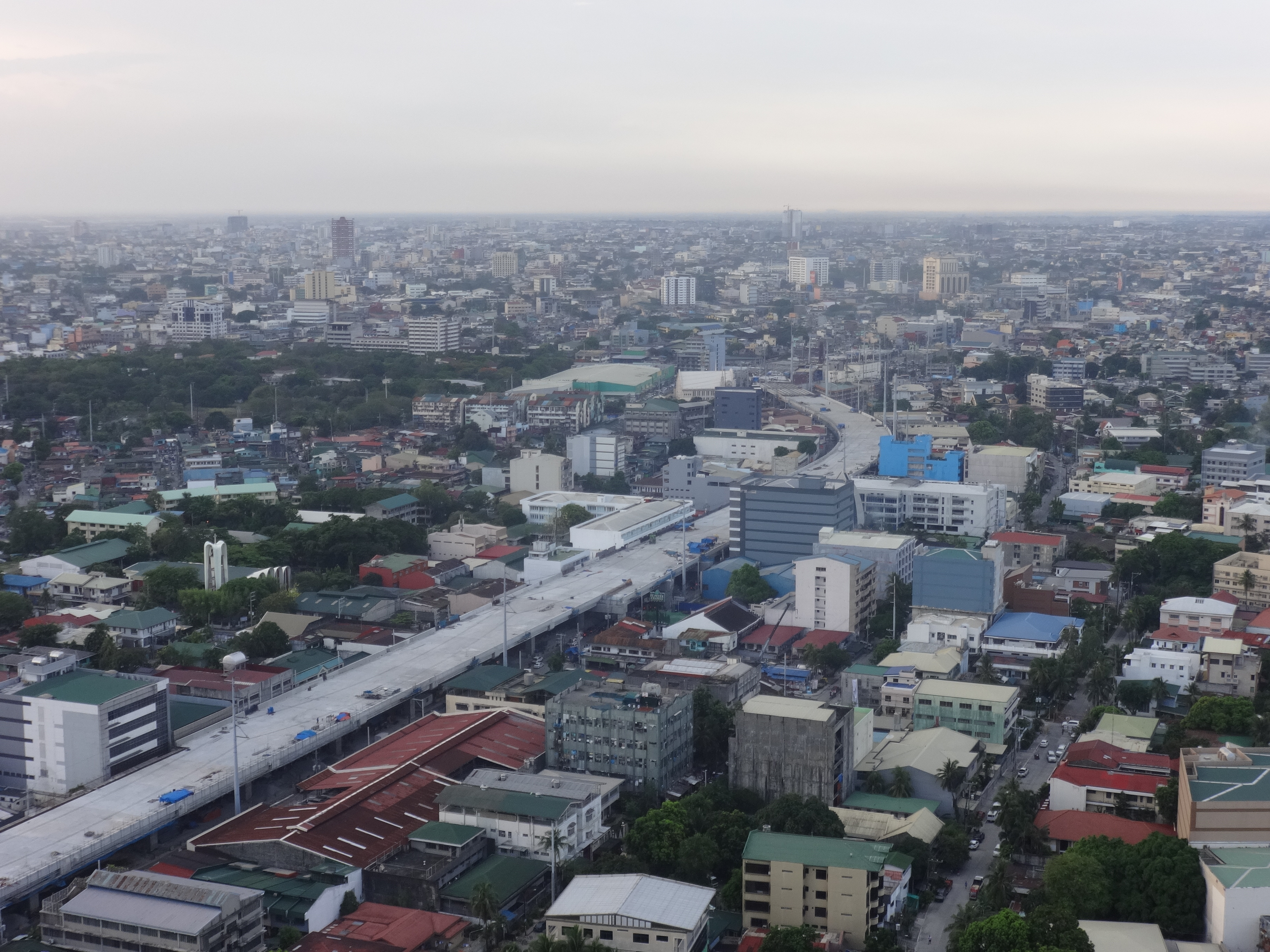
Stage 3 under construction above G. Araneta Avenue in Quezon City (2018)

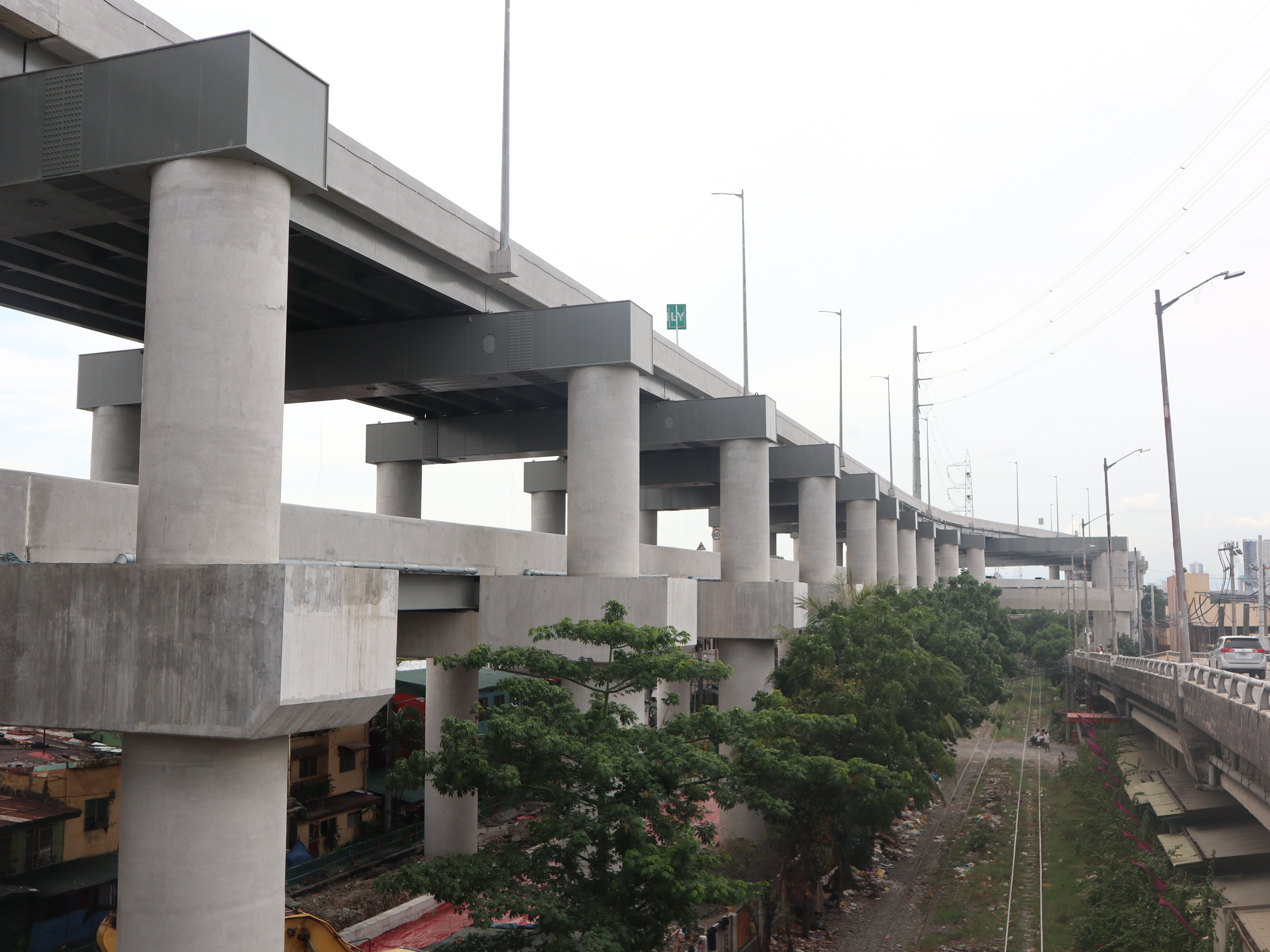
Stage 3's double-decker segment in Pandacan, Manila (June 2021)

The original plan for the third stage was conceptually in the 1990s. The route would have been a 10.5-kilometer (6.5 mi) route between Quirino Avenue and Sgt. Rivera, known as the Central Metro Manila Skyway and Stage 2 for its two routes would have run from Buendia (Gil Puyat) to Quirino Avenue for 2.5 kilometers (1.6 mi), as the extension of the South Metro Manila Skyway, then again from Sgt. Rivera to NLEX for 3.0 kilometers (1.9 mi), known as the North Metro Manila Skyway. All of the proposals were mentioned in the sources and in the 1999 Metro Manila Urban Transportation Integration Study (MMUTIS).

In 2007, Chinese Premier Wen Jiabao expressed China's interest, particularly the government-owned China Road and Bridge Corporation, in completing the Skyway project, which was supposed to link Alabang to Makati and then up to Balintawak, Quezon City. Additionally, there are plans to incorporate the port linkage (now absorbed by the new section NLEX Harbor Link) that connects Manila North Harbor and Radial Road 10.

The Department of Public Works and Highways (DPWH) received an unsolicited proposal to construct a Skyway extension from San Miguel Corporation-backed Citra Metro Manila Tollways Corporation (CMMTC), which would run from Buendia (Gil Puyat), Makati to Balintawak, Quezon City. The DPWH subjected the proposal to a Swiss challenge, which requires a government agency that has received an unsolicited bid for a project to publish the bid and invite third parties to match (or exceed) it. The project was approved by President Benigno Aquino III in September 2013.

The groundbreaking ceremony of Skyway Stage 3 was held on January 22, 2014, and construction began on February 17. It was expected to be completed in 2017, but the project experienced construction delays. Work stoppages due to the COVID-19 pandemic further delayed the project's full opening until late 2020.

During its construction of Stage 3, several drainage lines and electric poles were relocated to give space for the foundations of its expressway. The power transmission line of National Grid Corporation of the Philippines (NGCP), were rerouted. Most notably, the Sucat-Paco-Araneta-Balintawak Transmission Line relocates Araneta-Balintawak segment and Sucat-Paco segment with new steel poles while the old ones were retired. The San Juan River Bridge was also demolished in 2018 for Stage 3 works and was rebuilt by San Miguel Corporation (SMC) until 2020. Tomas Claudio Street in Manila was also closed between 2019 and 2022 as part of the construction.

Originally planned as divided into four segments, the original route was supposed to cross the Pasig River, meet the NLEX–SLEX Connector Road (the present-day NLEX Connector) near the PUP campus, and pass through Santa Mesa district and the city of San Juan. Due to right of way issues, however, it could not traverse through Santa Mesa and instead made it turn right from Tomas Claudio Street through the San Miguel Yamamura Packaging Corporation plastic plant in Pandacan towards the San Juan River and to G. Araneta Avenue. A second modification added a fifth segment at the north end which would cross the Balintawak Interchange and connect to the North Luzon Expressway's Balintawak toll plaza in Caloocan, extending Stage 3 to 18.83 kilometers (11.70 mi). The new segment raised the possibility of further northward expansion, eventually realized as the NALEX (Northern Access Link Expressway).

Prior to the COVID-19 pandemic, the Stage 3 project was to have six lanes per direction, and toll collection was supposed to be located at every exit. The animation shows planned Toll Plazas A and B were to be located in San Andres, north of the Buendia (Gil Puyat) southbound exit ramp. However, the plans were scrapped due to changes in toll collection to contactless, as well as the widening of the expressway to seven lanes.

Two significant accidents occurred during construction. On August 18, 2019, a coping beam collapsed on vehicles on the North Luzon Expressway, delaying southbound traffic; no injuries were reported. A February 1, 2020 fire at the San Miguel Yamamura Packaging Corporation plastic plant in Pandacan caused a 300-meter (980 ft) portion of Stage 3 to collapse, creating a long delay of the project. Fire damage required reconstruction of pierheads and replacement of the burnt girders, delaying the 2020 opening of the segment from April to November. Also, the planned opening was delayed amidst lockdowns due to COVID-19.

The northbound Buendia–Quirino portion opened on July 20, 2018. The Buendia–Plaza Dilao segment was partially opened toll-free on July 22, 2019, and the northbound exit ramp to Quirino Avenue opened on December 23 of that year. On October 13, 2020, San Miguel Corporation announced the final concrete pouring and completion of Skyway Stage 3. Due to rain, however, the asphalt overlay was delayed. On December 29, the remaining segment of Stage 3 up to NLEX partially opened. It was inaugurated on January 14, 2021 by former President Rodrigo Duterte, and became fully operational the following day, toll-free until July 12. While work on the expressway was being completed, Stage 3 was closed daily from 10:00 pm to 5:00 am (PST) daily. The segment opened around the clock in August 2021. Some toll plazas and entrance and exit ramps were closed from April 5–8 and May 24–28 for system tests by the Toll Regulatory Board (TRB).

Work on the elevated 1.2-kilometer (0.75 mi) link connecting the Skyway with the NLEX Connector began on January 28, 2021, after delays due to right of way issues. Other entry and exit ramps were later opened during the next few months. Toll collection began on July 12, 2021, after delays in toll approval and an operating permit. On December 28, 2024, the Maria Clara northbound off-ramp in Quezon City was opened.

In December 2022, it was reported that Metro Pacific Tollways Corporation (MPTC) would take over the spur of Stage 3. They sent a letter to the DPWH about requesting to build the 1.2 kilometers (0.75 mi) interconnection structure. MPTC also wants to build the connector road itself while looking for an alternative alignment that can cross the Pasig River.

=== SLEX Elevated Extension ===
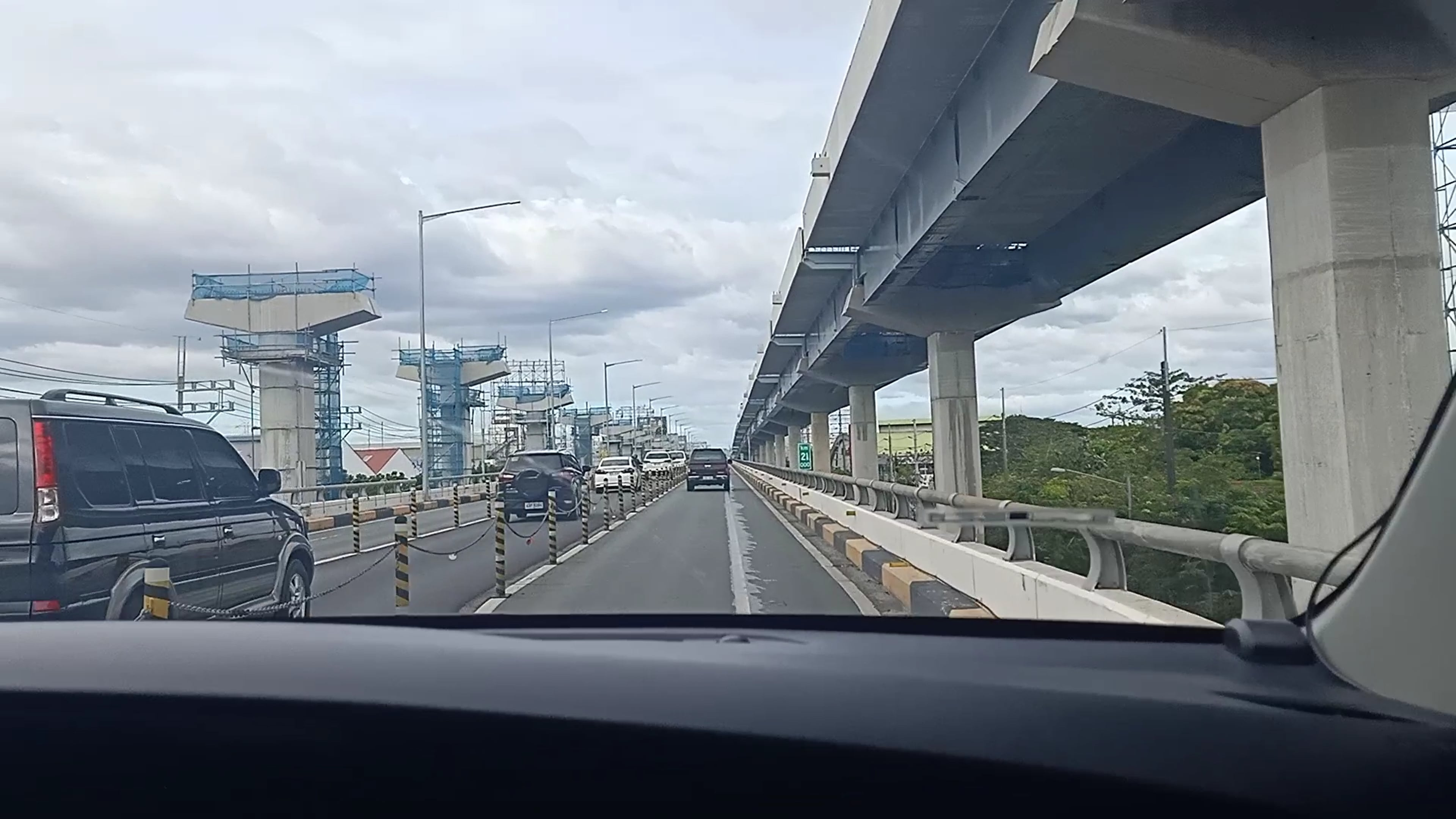
SLEX Elevated Extension under construction (above) (January 2021)

First proposed by SMC as the Skyway Extension Project in November 2017, the extension project planned to expand the two-lane section from the Skyway Main Line toll plaza to Alabang–Zapote Road to six lanes (three in each direction) and build an extension from South Station in Alabang to the South Luzon Expressway's Susana Heights exit in Muntinlupa. The SLEX Elevated Extension is the first phase of the corporation's three-year expansion project of all toll roads in southern Metro Manila to ease traffic congestion. In addition to ramps connecting the South Luzon Expressway section near Soldiers Hills and the Skyway main toll plaza, it will include construction of a northbound ramp connecting the Alabang viaduct to the South Station toll plaza and widening of the South Station toll plaza.

Construction of the extension began in August 2019. To facilitate the extension's construction, the Hillsborough ramps were closed and demolished; the northbound on-ramp was closed in 2020, followed by the southbound off-ramp on April 19, 2021. The extension was originally expected to be completed by December 2020. However, the COVID-19 pandemic and construction delays postponed the extension opening until 2021. A November 21, 2020 construction accident on the East Service Road in Barangay Cupang, Muntinlupa caused delays. The 3.99-kilometer (2.48 mi) northbound section of the project was finished on March 24, 2021, and was soft-opened (toll-free until further notice) on April 11. The 3.6-kilometer (2.2 mi) southbound section then opened on December 10. The extension was inaugurated on February 15, 2022, as the South Luzon Expressway (SLEX) Elevated Extension Project.

== Operations and maintenance ==
The Skyway is operated and maintained by the Skyway Operations and Maintenance Corporation (SOMCO). SOMCO took over the expressway's operations and maintenance from former operator PNCC Skyway Corporation in January 2008 and was declared to comply with the July 2007 Amended Supplemental Toll Operators Agreement (A-STOA) between the PNCC, Citra Metro Manila Tollways Corporation and the Toll Regulatory Board (TRB), which awarded management of the 35-kilometer (22 mi) road to Citra. The Skyway uses the Vendeka toll-collection system. SOMCO controls the Skyway three main operational functions: traffic safety and management, maintenance, and toll collection.

The expressway's concessionaire varies by stage. The concessionaire of Stages 1 and 2 (known as the South Metro Manila Skyway Project), including the at-grade portion of the South Luzon Expressway from Magallanes to Alabang, and SLEX Elevated Extension is SMC Skyway Corporation (formerly Citra Metro Manila Tollways Corporation, or CMMTC). The concessionaire of Stage 3 is SMC Skyway Stage 3 Corporation (formerly Citra Central Expressway Corporation), a subsidiary of Stage 3 Connector Tollways Holding Corporation (S3CTH).

The aforementioned companies are subsidiaries of San Miguel Corporation through SMC Infrastructure.

== Future ==
=== Skyway Stage 4 ===
Southeast Metro Manila Expressway
- Location: Arca South, Taguig – Batasang Pambansa, Quezon City
- Length: 32.664 km (20.296 mi)

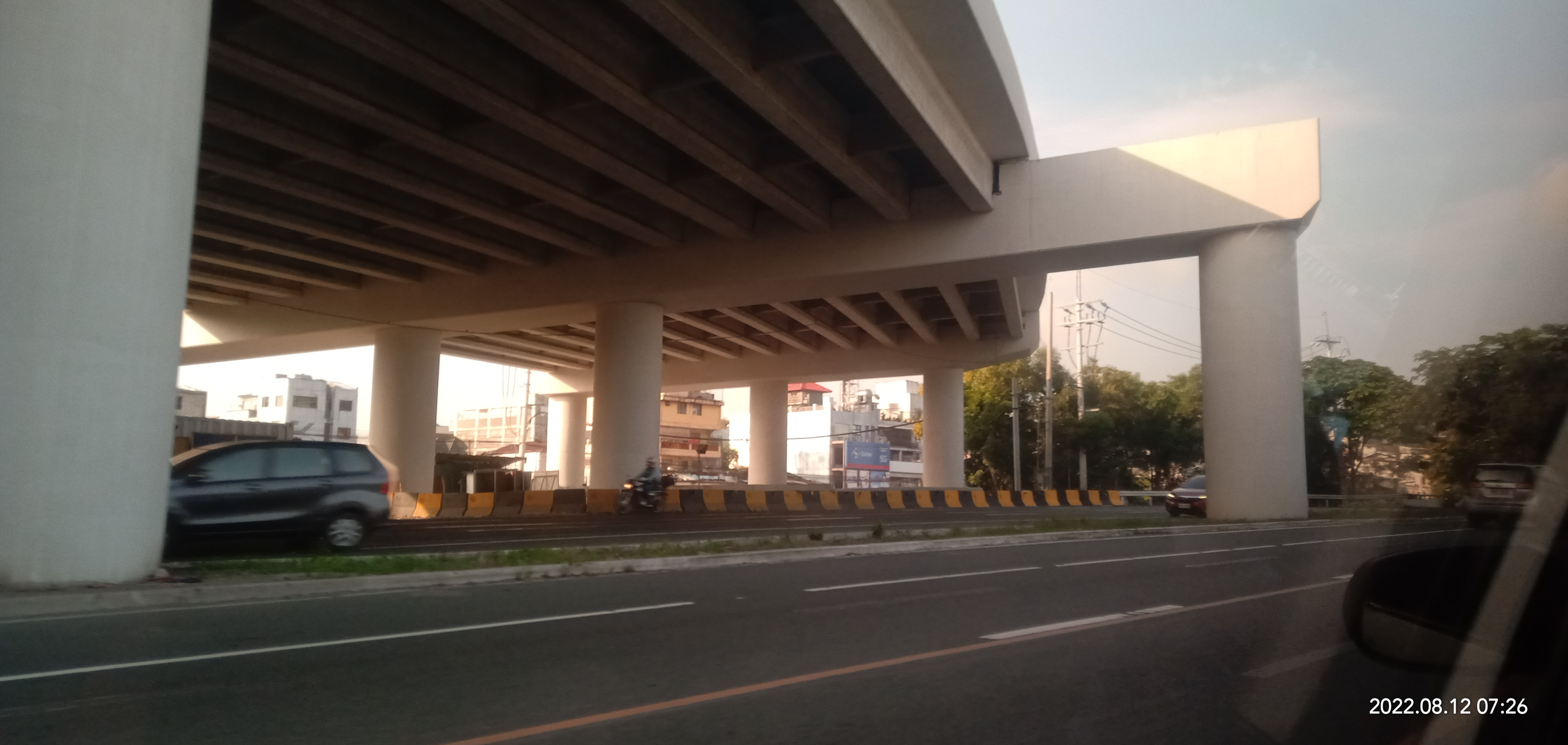
Construction of SEMME along Carlos P. Garcia Avenue (C-5), Taguig (August 2022)

The Southeast Metro Manila Expressway (SEMME), also known as Skyway Stage 4, is a 32.664-kilometer (20.296 mi) under-construction expressway from Skyway Stage 2 near Arca South in Taguig to Batasan Road (near Batasang Pambansa Complex) in Quezon City. The expressway is planned to extend to Bulacan. The project aims to provide an alternate route to EDSA, C-5, and other major roads for motorists coming from Rizal and the Calabarzon area to ease traffic congestion. The project's groundbreaking ceremony was held on January 8, 2018, and it was expected to be completed by 2022. As of 2024, however, the project was delayed due to right of way issues.

=== New Manila International Airport link ===
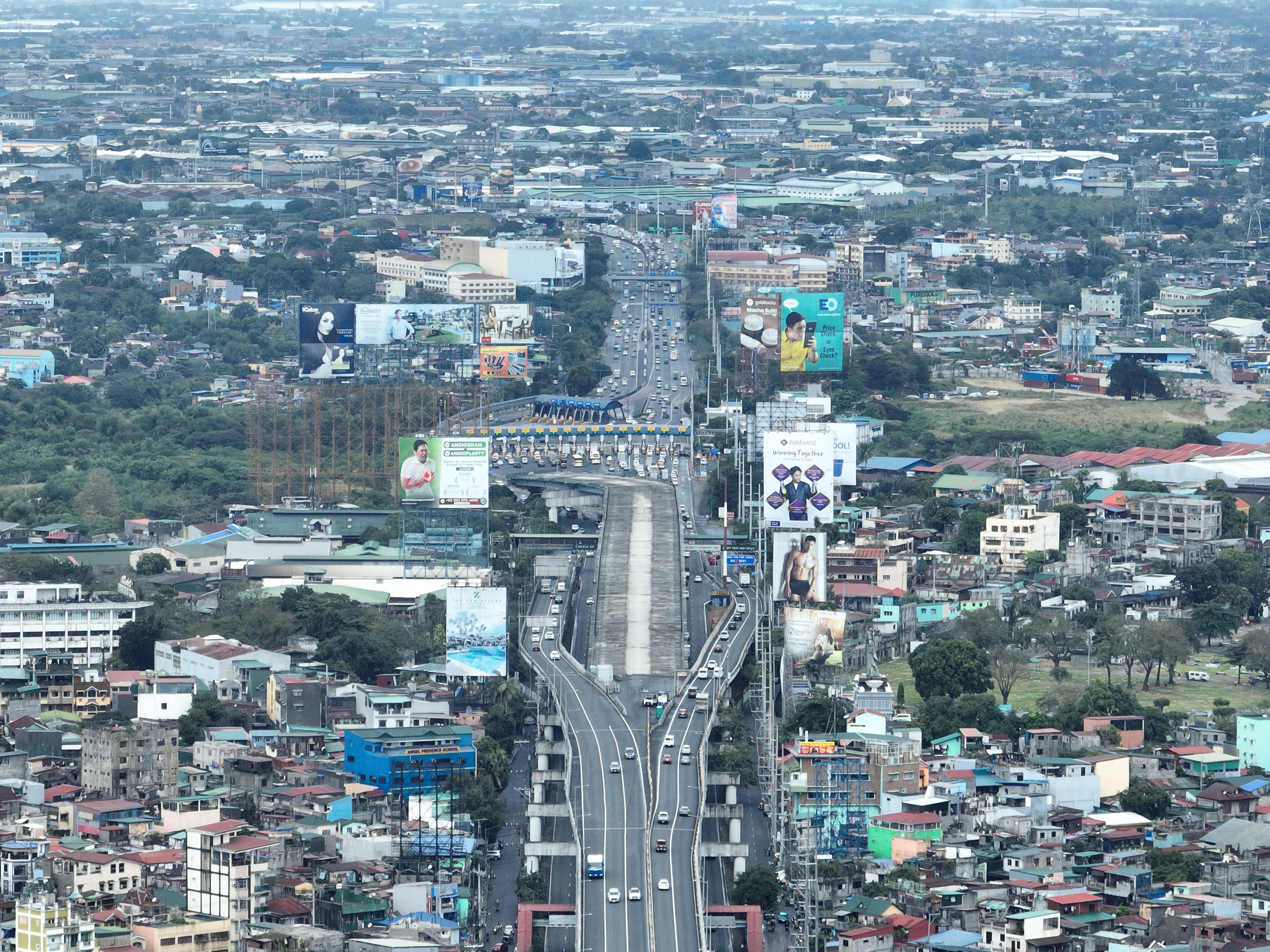
Drone shot of the under-construction Northern Access Link Expressway, NLEX, and the northern end of Skyway (February 2026)

As a part of San Miguel Corporation's New Manila International Airport (NMIA) project, the concessionaire proposed linking the airport to NLEX and SLEX via Skyway Stage 3. The section of NLEX between its Balintawak toll plaza and Skyway's Balintawak on- and off-ramps mostly in Caloocan has pillars to connect the Skyway northward to a future toll road which will lead to the new airport in Bulakan, Bulacan. The project runs above a toll road operated by NLEX Corporation, another concessionaire.

The toll road project, later known as the Northern Access Link Expressway (NALEX), was approved by the Toll Regulatory Board in June 2022. It would be 19 kilometers (12 mi) long from Skyway Stage 3 to a roundabout in Meycauayan, near the airport. Another 117-kilometer (73 mi) stretch would be built beyond the NMIA roundabout, ending at the southern end of the Tarlac–Pangasinan–La Union Expressway in Tarlac City. When completed, NALEX would be 136 kilometers (85 mi) long. The NALEX project costs ₱148 billion and the first segment is targeted to be completed by 2028.

=== Southern Access Link Expressway ===
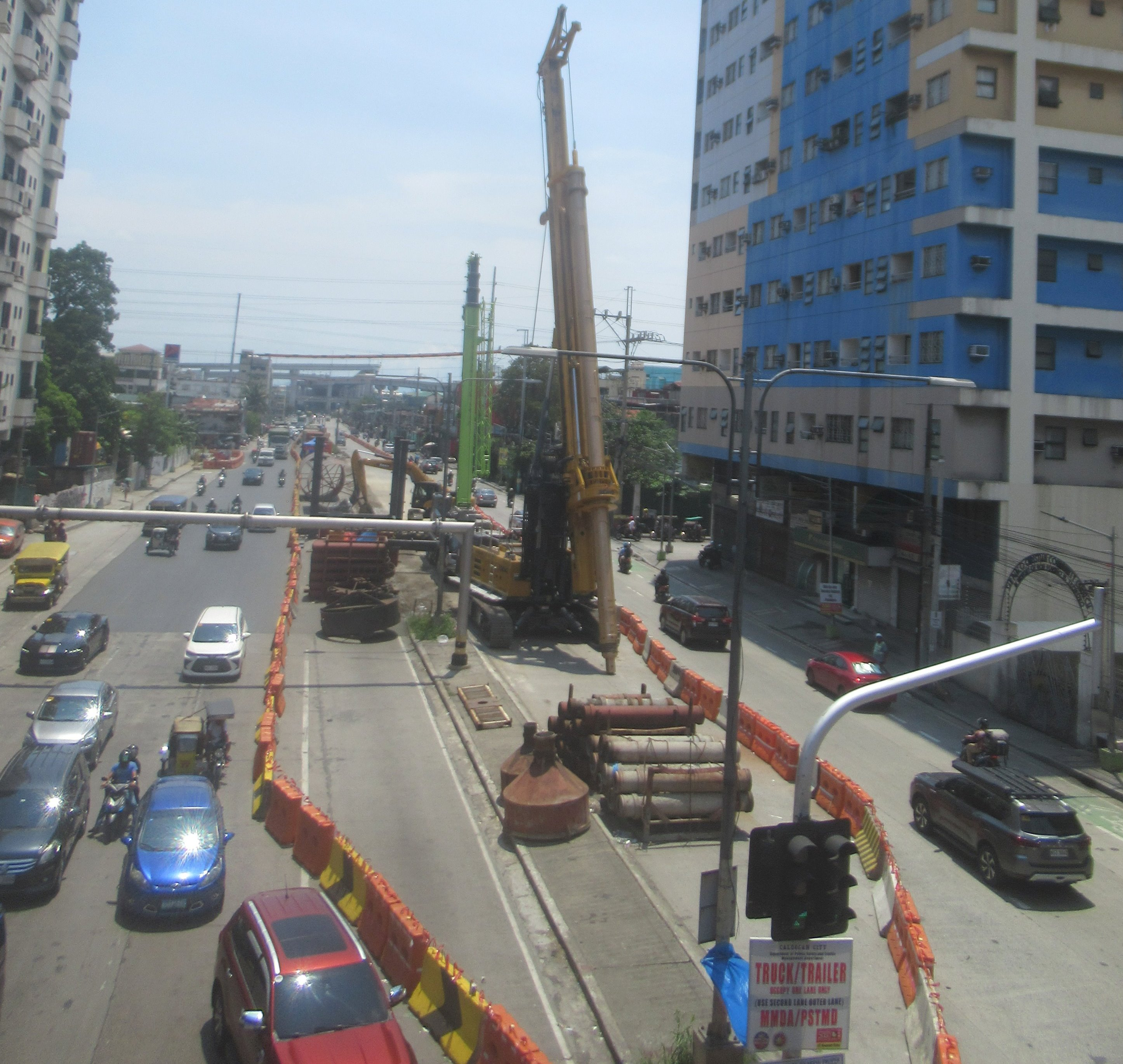
Construction of Skyway's C3–R10 Extension, which will be part of SALEX, along 5th Avenue, Caloocan (July 2026)

The Southern Access Link Expressway (SALEX) is a proposed series of elevated expressways through the western part of Metro Manila. It is part of Component 2 of the Greater Capital Region Integrated Expressways Network. SALEX is a proposed 40.65-kilometer (25.26 mi) elevated expressway network comprising the Shoreline Expressway and three (3) Metro Manila Skyway Stage (MMSS3) Extensions, namely: C3–R10 Extension, Quirino Extension, and Buendia (Gil Puyat) Extension. SALEX will improve motorists’ access to the NMIA as well as support its surrounding economies.

=== Bus rapid transit ===
According to San Miguel Corporation president and COO Ramon Ang, the company began considering bus rapid transit on the Skyway in 2017. The proposed system, announced on April 26, 2021, may have high-capacity point-to-point (P2P) buses, and will be sent to the Department of Transportation when finalized. It aims to make commutes safer and more convenient, maximizing the benefits of the elevated expressway in diverting vehicles from other roads. However, no updates were made.

== Tolls ==
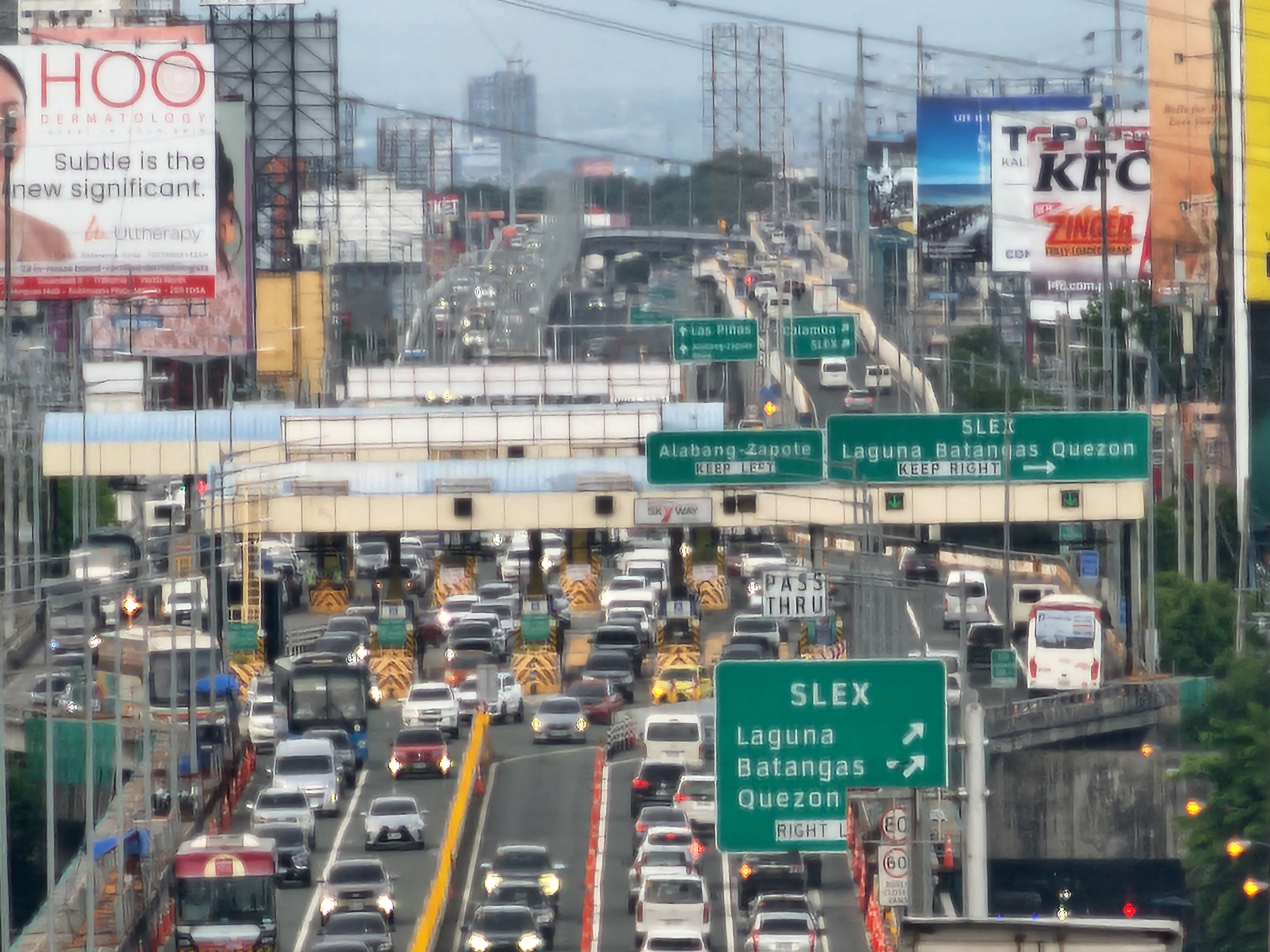
The Skyway looking south towards the Main Line toll plaza in Muntinlupa

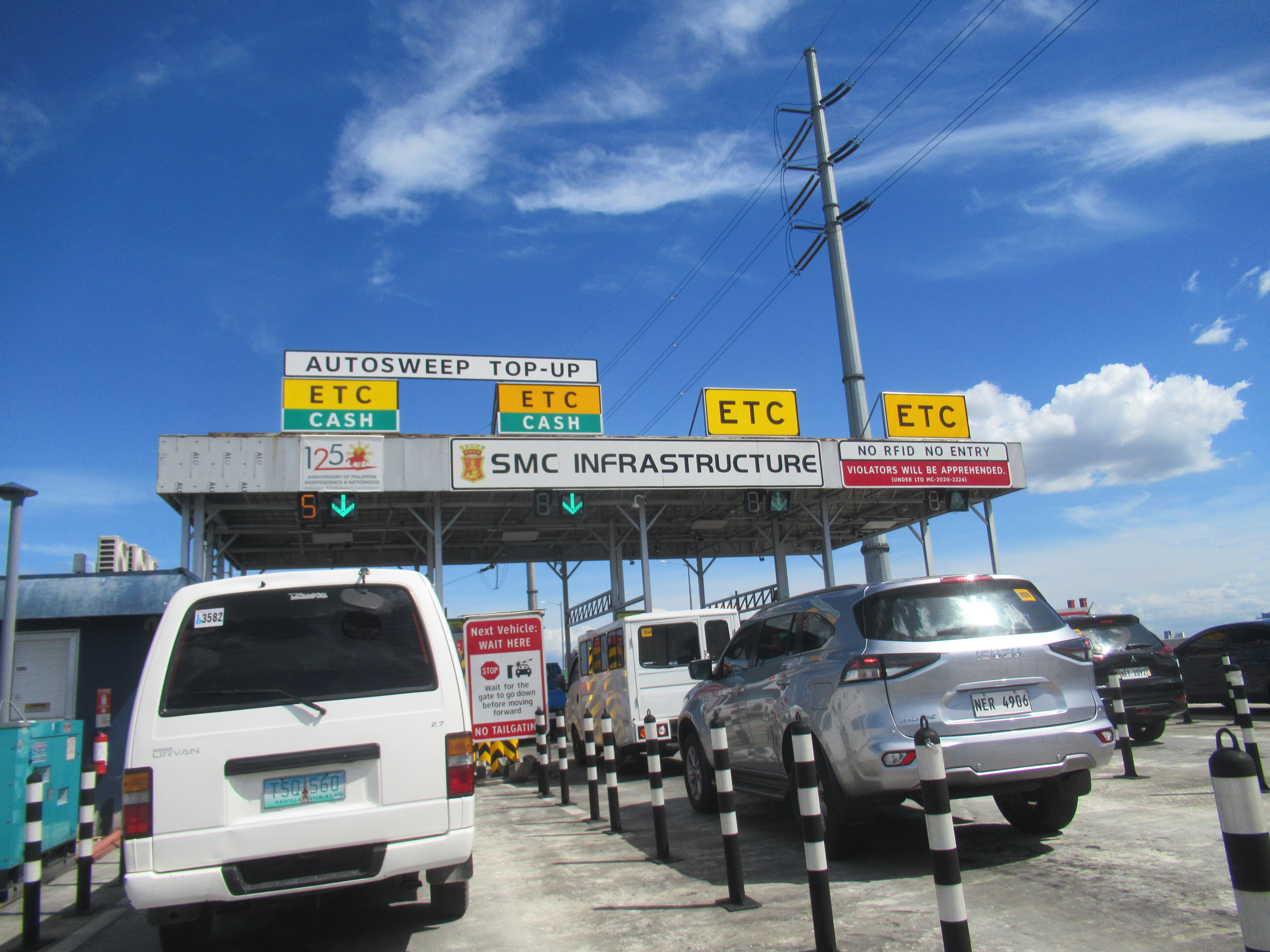
Del Monte Toll Plaza B (southbound)

The expressway combines open-road, closed-road, and barrier toll systems. Toll collection is divided between the South Metro Manila Skyway Project and Skyway Stage 3 but are altogether part of the Seamless Southern Tollways program of San Miguel Corporation.

The South Metro Manila Skyway toll system is integrated with the South Luzon (SLEX) and Muntinlupa–Cavite Expressways (MCX). Northbound tolls are collected upon entry on Skyway or NAIAX. Entering motorists from SLEX pay an additional toll at the Main Line toll plaza in Muntinlupa. Tolls are not charged at northbound exits from Magallanes to Buendia, but additional toll fees apply upon exit from NAIAX or Skyway Stage 3. Southbound tolls are collected upon exit from Skyway, NAIAX, SLEX, MCX, or STAR Tollway. No tickets are issued at southbound entrances.

On the other hand, Stage 3 tolls are based on distance and vehicle class. Northbound tolls are collected at either Del Monte toll plaza for exits at Sgt. Rivera, A. Bonifacio, or Balintawak (NLEX), or upon exit elsewhere. Southbound tolls are collected at either Del Monte for exits at Quezon Avenue or G. Araneta, or upon exit elsewhere. Exit toll collection for NLEX Connector (via elevated spur road in Manila) is yet to be determined.

The Skyway uses the RFID-based Autosweep electronic toll collection (ETC) system used on the expressways by San Miguel Tollways. Previously, the transponder-based E-Pass was used. ETC lanes are usually on the left lane of a toll plaza, but mixed lanes also accepting cash exist. More ETC lanes were added at toll barriers as Philippine tollways shift towards cashless toll collection. RFID installation and reloading lanes are also located at selected Skyway toll plazas. Cash is accepted only at South Skyway and some toll plazas of Stage 3.

Class 3 vehicles are currently not permitted to use the Skyway, and trucks are banned on Stage 3 due to safety concerns. The under-construction NLEX Connector is expected to compensate for the restriction, which will bypass the majority of Stage 3 to connect to South Skyway.

The toll rates are as follows:

=== South Metro Manila Skyway ===
Class	Toll		
Class	to & from Alabang/SLEX	to & from Sucat	to & from Bicutan
Class 1 (Cars, motorcycles, SUVs)	₱164.00	₱118.00	₱72.00
Class 2 (Buses, light trucks)	₱329.00	₱237.00	₱145.00
Class 3 (Heavy trucks)	₱493.00	₱356.00	₱218.00

=== Skyway Stage 3 ===
Class	Toll		
Class	Buendia to Plaza Azul/Nagtahan	E. Rodriguez to NLEX Balintawak	Buendia to NLEX Balintawak
Class 1 (Cars, motorcycles, SUVs)	₱105.00	₱129.00	₱264.00
Class 2 (Buses, light trucks)	₱210.00	₱258.00	₱528.00

== Exits ==
This entire route is located in Metro Manila. Exits and intersections are numbered by kilometer posts, currently found only on Stages 1 and 2, with Rizal Park in Manila designated as Kilometer 0.

Province	City/Municipality	km	mi	Exit	Name	Destinations	Notes
Caloocan – Malabon boundary					Balintawak (NLEX)	AH26 (NLEX) – Tarlac, Baguio	Northbound exit and southbound entrance; northern terminus of the Skyway system; future link to Northern Access Link Expressway towards New Manila International Airport
Quezon City					A. Bonifacio (EDSA)	N160 (A. Bonifacio Avenue) – Balintawak	Northbound exit and southbound entrance
Quezon City					Sgt. Rivera (C-3/R-10)	N130 (5th Avenue) – Caloocan, R-10, Balintawak	Northbound exit, southbound entrance, and tolled southbound exit; includes northbound exit ramp to N130 (Sgt. Rivera Avenue) / N160 (A. Bonifacio Avenue); future link to Southern Access Link Expressway via C3–R10 Extension
Quezon City				Del Monte Toll Plaza			
Quezon City					G. Araneta (Maria Clara/Talayan)	N130 (G. Araneta Avenue) / Calamba Street	Northbound exit
Quezon City					Quezon Avenue	N130 (G. Araneta Avenue) / N170 (Quezon Avenue)	Tolled northbound exit, northbound entrance and southbound entrance; untolled southbound exit
Quezon City					G. Araneta (Araneta Avenue)	N130 (G. Araneta Avenue)	Southbound exit (formerly E. Rodriguez) and tolled northbound entrance; access to N180 (Aurora Boulevard & Magsaysay Boulevard)
Quezon City					Aurora Boulevard	G. Araneta Avenue	Future northbound entrance near N. Domingo Street, San Juan
Manila					Tomas Claudio		Link to NLEX Connector via elevated spur road
Manila					Nagtahan	N140 (Quirino Avenue) – Nagtahan	Tolled southbound exit and northbound entrance
Manila					Quirino (Pedro Gil)	N140 (Quirino Avenue) / N156 (Plaza Dilao Road) – Plaza Dilao	Tolled southbound exit; construction of ramp to N156 (Quirino Avenue Extension) suspended
Manila					Nagtahan	N140 (Quirino Avenue) – Nagtahan	Tolled northbound exit
Manila					Plaza Dilao	N140 (Quirino Avenue)	Tolled southbound entrance
Manila					Quirino	N140 (Quirino Avenue) / Pedro Gil Street – Santa Mesa, Roxas Boulevard	Tolled directional-T interchange; southbound entrance from N145 (Osmeña Highway) construction pending; future link to Southern Access Link Expressway via Quirino Extension
Manila				Gil Puyat Toll Plaza B (southbound only) (Note: The toll plazas were planned as part of the original project. These were demolished in 2020, a few months before the opening of Skyway Stage 3. The former site of the southbound toll plazas later housed RFID installation lanes for northbound motorists.)			
Manila				Gil Puyat Toll Plaza A (southbound only)			
Makati		– 6	– 3.7		Buendia (Gil Puyat)	N145 (Osmeña Highway) / N190 (Gil Puyat Avenue)	Tolled northbound entrance and southbound exit (Zobel); untolled northbound exit and southbound entrance; northern end of AH26 concurrency; former northern terminus (1998–2020)
Makati		6.6– 6.7	4.1– 4.2		Amorsolo	Amorsolo Street	Northbound exit and southbound entrance; entrance ramp accessible via Arnaiz Avenue westbound
Makati		7.2	4.5		Don Bosco	N145 (Osmeña Highway) / Don Bosco Street	Northbound exit
Makati					EDSA	AH26 (EDSA)	Future northbound entrance
Pasay – Taguig boundary		9.3	5.8		Magallanes	AH26 (SLEX) – Magallanes	Northbound exit and southbound entrance
Taguig		9.6– 10.1	6.0– 6.3		NAIAX	E6 (NAIAX) – NAIA Terminals 1, 2, 3	Directional T interchange, part of Sales Interchange
Taguig		10.5	6.5	Skyway Toll Plaza A (1998–2011, demolished) (Note: Toll Plaza A served both directions while Toll Plaza B served northbound vehicles only.)			
Taguig		11.0	6.8	Runway Toll Plaza A (northbound only, pass-thru for northbound light vehicles) (2018–2020, demolished)			
Taguig		11.1	6.9	Runway Toll Plaza (Skyway/Runway Toll Plaza B) (Note: Runway Toll Plaza is previously known as Runway Toll Plaza B especially when it coexisted with the former Runway Toll Plaza A from 2018 to 2020. Previously, it was the site of the Skyway Toll Plaza B until 2011.) (northbound only, pass-thru and RFID installation and reloading station) (1998–2011, 2018–2025, demolished)			
Taguig – Parañaque boundary		11.9– 12.1	7.4– 7.5			E5 (SEMME) – TCITX, Arca South, Rizal	Future Skyway/FTI Interchange of SEMME; directional T interchange
Parañaque		13.4– 13.5	8.3– 8.4		Bicutan (Doña Soledad)	Doña Soledad Avenue	Tolled southbound exit and northbound entrance. Former southern terminus (1998–2010)
Parañaque		14.6	9.1			SLEX	Former southbound exit and northbound entrance (1998–2011), replaced by the Hillsborough ramps.
Parañaque – Muntinlupa boundary		17.5	10.9		Sucat (Dr. A. Santos)	N63 (Dr. A. Santos Avenue)	Tolled southbound exit and northbound entrance
Muntinlupa		19.0	11.8	Skyway Main Toll Plaza Southbound (permanently closed in 2015)			
Muntinlupa		19.1	11.9	Skyway Main Toll Plaza Bravo/Alpha (4 lanes Bravo 5 lanes used to be 6 from 2011 to 2022 Alpha formerly known as Skyway Main Toll Plaza Northbound)			
Muntinlupa		19.5	12.1		Hillsborough	AH26 (SLEX) – Calamba	Northbound entrance (2011–2020) and southbound exit (2011–2021), replaced by the Skyway Extension Project
Muntinlupa		21.1	13.1	South Station (Alabang) Toll Plaza (2011–2020, demolished)			
Muntinlupa						AH26 (SLEX)	Skyway-Alabang Viaduct Connecting Ramp; future northbound entrance to be built from the shoulder of Alabang Viaduct
Muntinlupa		21.33	13.25			AH26 (SLEX) – Calamba	Temporary southbound exit and northbound entrance during the construction of Extension Project (2019–2021)
Muntinlupa		21.6	13.4		South Station (Alabang-Zapote / Bunye)	N411 (Alabang–Zapote Road) – South Station, Las Piñas	Tolled southbound exit and northbound entrance; former southern terminus (2010–2021)
Muntinlupa		23.416– 23.447	14.550– 14.569		SLEX Elevated Extension	AH26 (SLEX) – Laguna, Batangas, Quezon	Untolled northbound entrance and southbound exit; southern terminus of the Skyway system
1.000 mi = 1.609 km; 1.000 km = 0.621 mi: Closed/former; Concurrency terminus; Incomplete access; Tolled; Unopened

=== Skyway Stage 3–NLEX Connector link ===
The entire route is located in Manila. Referred to as Sections 2A' (Tomas Claudio – PUP, Sta. Mesa) or as part of Section 1A - 2 (Plaza Berde – PUP campus) of Skyway Stage 3, this 1.2-kilometer (0.75 mi) segment of Skyway will link the main line of Skyway Stage 3 near Tomas Claudio Street (Nagtahan Link Bridge) and NLEX Connector near the Polytechnic University of the Philippines (PUP) campus in Santa Mesa.

km	mi	Exit	Name	Destinations	Notes
			Tomas Claudio	Skyway – Alabang, NAIA, Balintawak	Southern terminus of the spur. Connection to the main line of Skyway.
				N141 (Valenzuela Street) – Santa Mesa	Northbound exit and southbound entry; under planning and for approval
				NLEX Connector – Caloocan, Port of Manila, Baguio	Northern terminus of the spur. Continues north as NLEX Connector.
1.000 mi = 1.609 km; 1.000 km = 0.621 mi: Unopened

== See also ==
- Metro Manila Dream Plan
