= Radial Road 3 =

Road in the Philippines

R-3 Radial Road 3
- R-3 Road
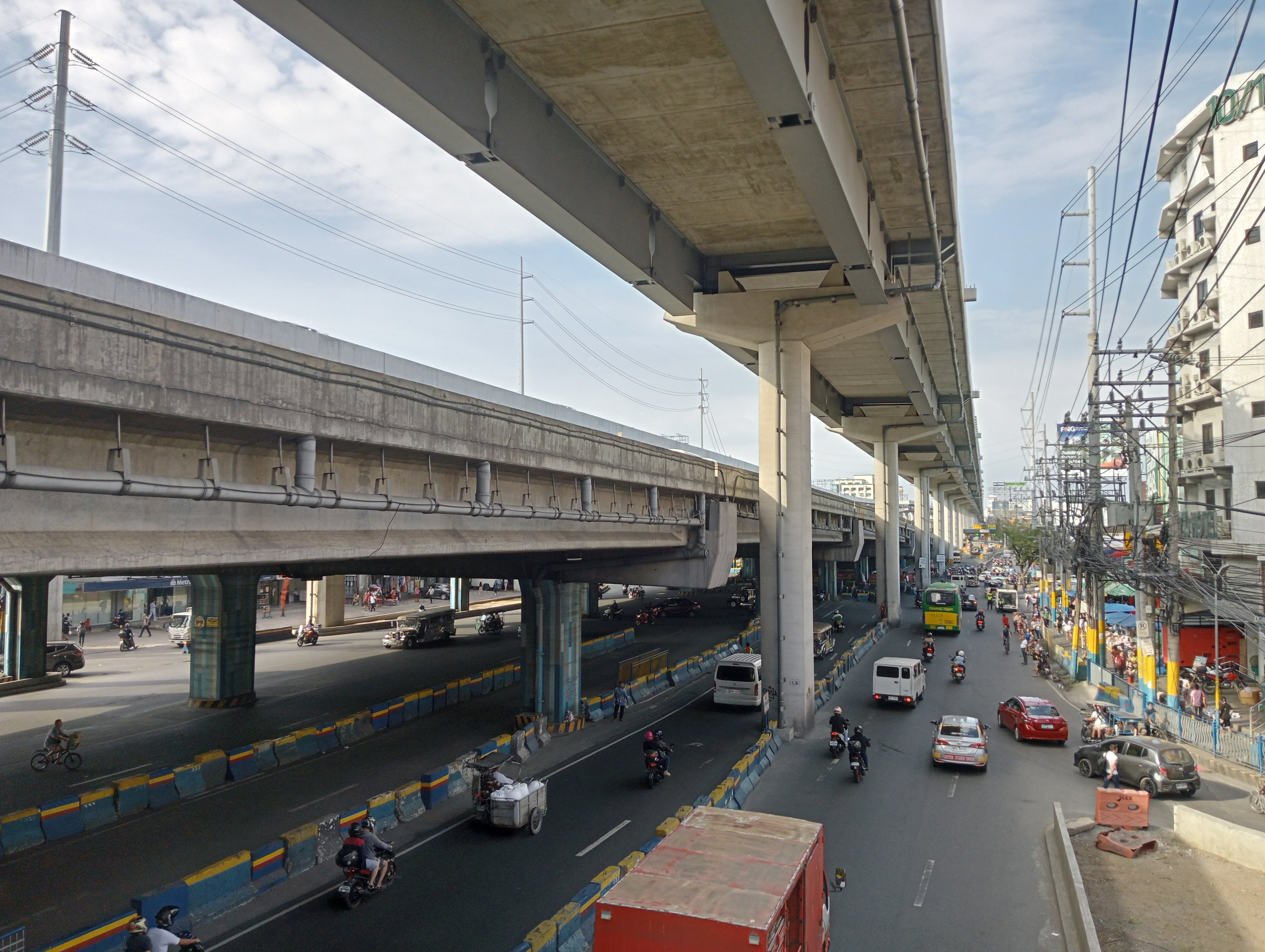
- A portion of Radial Road 3 beneath the Skyway (SLEX Elevated Extension) and Alabang Viaduct in Alabang, Muntinlupa

Route information
- Maintained by the Department of Public Works and Highways and the Metropolitan Manila Development Authority
- Component highways: N145 in Manila and Makati; N1 in Muntinlupa

Major junctions
- North end: N140 (Quirino Avenue) in Manila
- South end: Turbina, Calamba, Laguna

Location
- Country: Philippines
- Regions: Metro Manila, Calabarzon
- Major cities: Makati, Manila, Muntinlupa, Parañaque, Pasay, and Taguig

Highway system
- Roads in the Philippines; Highways; Expressways; List

Radial Road 3 (R-3), informally known as the R-3 Road, is a network of roads and bridges which comprise the third arterial road of Metro Manila in the Philippines. It connects the cities of Manila, Makati, Pasay, Taguig, Parañaque, and Muntinlupa.

== Route description ==
=== Osmeña Highway ===
Between its northern terminus at the intersection with Quirino Avenue (C-3) in Paco district and EDSA (C-4) at Magallanes Interchange in Makati, R-3 is known as Osmeña Highway. It used to be known as South Superhighway and was renamed after Commonwealth president Sergio Osmeña.

The South Luzon Expressway (SLEX) fills a 900-meter (3,000 ft) gap in Barangay Magallanes, Makati, between the Magallanes Interchange and the old northern terminus of West Service Road, located next to Skyway's Magallanes on-ramp at the city's boundary with Pasay.

=== East Service Road and West Service Road ===
R-3 later follows the alignment of East and West Service Roads, both frontage roads parallel to the South Luzon Expressway from Sales Interchange in Pasay and Taguig to Alabang Exit in Muntinlupa. The alignment of West Service Road starts as a zipper lane on the southbound lane of SLEX at the Makati–Pasay boundary, extending as a shoulder onto Sales Interchange, while that of East Service Road commences at Lawton Avenue in Taguig. However, the R-3 section of West Service Road terminates at its sharp curve next to SLEX's Alabang and South Station Exits.

=== Manila South Road ===
Finally, R-3 traverses the entirety of the Muntinlupa segment of Manila South Road (National Highway), serving as the logical continuation of the East Service Road. It stretches from its junction with Montillano Street and Alabang–Zapote Road beneath SLEX's Alabang Viaduct in Alabang to the Muntinlupa Bridge, which crosses the Tunasan River at the city's border with San Pedro, Laguna. R-3 continues on as National Road until it meets with Maharlika Highway in Turbina.
