= Toll Regulatory Board =

Philippine government agency

- Lupong Tagapamahala sa Toll

Agency overview
- Formed: March 31, 1977; 49 years ago
- Superseding agency: Department of Transportation (Philippines)
- Headquarters: 5/F The Columbia Tower, Ortigas Avenue, Brgy. Wack-Wack, Mandaluyong
- Employees: 27 (2024)
- Annual budget: ₱34.82 million (2021)
- Agency executive: Jose Arturo Tugade, Executive Director
- Parent agency: Department of Transportation
- Website: Official website

The Toll Regulatory Board (TRB; Filipino: Lupong Tagapamahala sa Toll) is a Philippine government agency that regulates all toll roads in the Philippines.

== Functions ==
The TRB was created by virtue of Presidential Decree No. 1112 or the Toll Operation Decree. It possesses regulatory authority over all toll facilities in the Philippines, and is authorized under its charter to enter into contracts on behalf of the Republic of the Philippines, with qualified persons, natural or juridical, for the construction, operation and maintenance of toll facilities.

At present, it exercises jurisdiction over the following toll facilities:

1. North Luzon Expressway (NLEX)
2. South Luzon Expressway (SLEX)
3. Manila–Cavite Expressway (CAVITEx)
4. Skyway Stage 1
5. Skyway Stage 2
6. Skyway Stage 3
7. Muntinlupa–Cavite Expressway (MCx)
8. Cavite–Laguna Expressway (CALAX)
9. NAIA Expressway (NAIAx)
10. Southern Tagalog Arterial Road (STAR Tollway)
11. Subic Freeport Expressway (SFEX)
12. Subic–Clark–Tarlac Expressway (SCTEx)
13. Tarlac–Pangasinan–La Union Expressway (TPLEx)

From 2005 to 2007, the TRB entered into contracts with private investors for the expansion and rehabilitation of its existing projects such as the SLEX, Skyway, Coastal Road and STAR Tollway and the construction of the new Subic-Clark-Tarlac Expressway (SCTEX) that would link Metro Manila to the Central Luzon area and the special economic zones located in Subic and Clark.

Other projects in the pipeline involve the extension of the NLEX that would connect it to the existing SLEX. Also, the TRB is considering the construction of new toll road development projects in the Calabarzon area.

The TRB played a vital role in spurring economic progress in the Philippines by improving and providing vital road networks that are necessary in revitalizing the economies of regions outside Metro Manila.

Its office address is located at 5/F The Columbia Tower, Ortigas Avenue, Brgy. Wack-Wack, Mandaluyong.

== See also ==
- Department of Transportation
- Department of Public Works and Highways
