= Circumferential Road 3 =

Third beltway of Metro Manila's highways

C-3 Circumferential Road 3
- C-3 Road
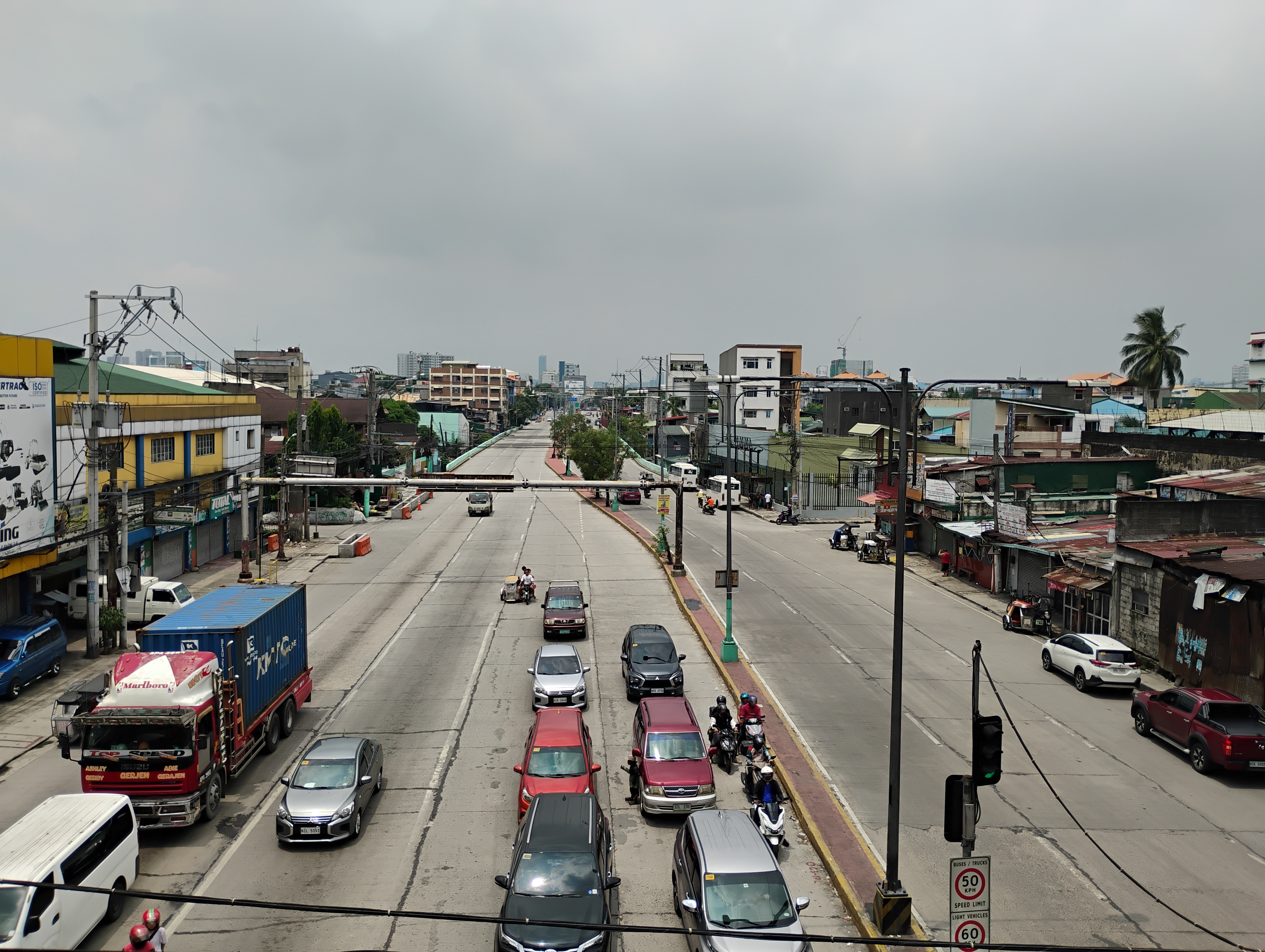
- C-3 (5th Avenue) eastbound in Caloocan

Route information
- Maintained by the Department of Public Works and Highways and Metropolitan Manila Development Authority
- Length: 10.8 km (6.7 mi)
- Component highways: N130 from Navotas to Quezon City

Major junctions
- North end: AH 26 (N120) (Radial Road 10) in Navotas
- E5 (NLEX Harbor Link) and E2 (NLEX Connector) in Caloocan
- South end: N. Domingo Street in San Juan

Location
- Country: Philippines
- Major cities: Caloocan, Navotas, Quezon City, and San Juan

Highway system
- Roads in the Philippines; Highways; Expressways; List

Circumferential Road 3 (C-3), informally known as the C-3 Road, is a network of roads and bridges which comprise the third beltway of Metro Manila in the Philippines. Spanning some 10.8 kilometers (6.7 mi), it connects the cities of Caloocan, Navotas, Quezon City, and San Juan.

The road's segment from its northern terminus at Radial Road 10 in Navotas to its intersection with Magsaysay Boulevard and Aurora Boulevard in Quezon City forms the entire National Route 130 (N130) of the Philippine highway network

== History ==
The development of a major road network in Manila was first conceived in the Metropolitan Thoroughfare Plan of 1945, predicting that the metropolis would expand further to the shorelines of Laguna de Bay. The plan proposed the laying of circumferential roads 1 to 6 and radial roads 1 to 10.

The route was originally planned to be a complete beltway around the city of Manila, from Navotas in the north to Pasay at the south. In 1978, the feasibility study conducted by the Japan International Cooperation Agency of the road was conducted, consisting of two projects: the main route between Ayala Avenue, Makati, and Rizal Avenue, Caloocan, and a spur leading to Balintawak, with a total length of 15 kilometers (9.3 mi). The missing link between Makati and San Juan was never built due to right of way issues. However, the government opted to construct two elevated expressways instead, with the Skyway Stage 3 and NLEX Connector. The Metro Manila Skybridge was supposed to be the missing link of the route between G. Araneta Avenue in Quezon City and South Avenue in Makati, with several interchanges. However, it was shelved due to the Skyway Stage 3 project occupying the portion of the San Juan River. South Avenue, Ayala Avenue Extension, and Gil Puyat Avenue were later removed from the alignment of C-3.

=== Alignment proposals ===
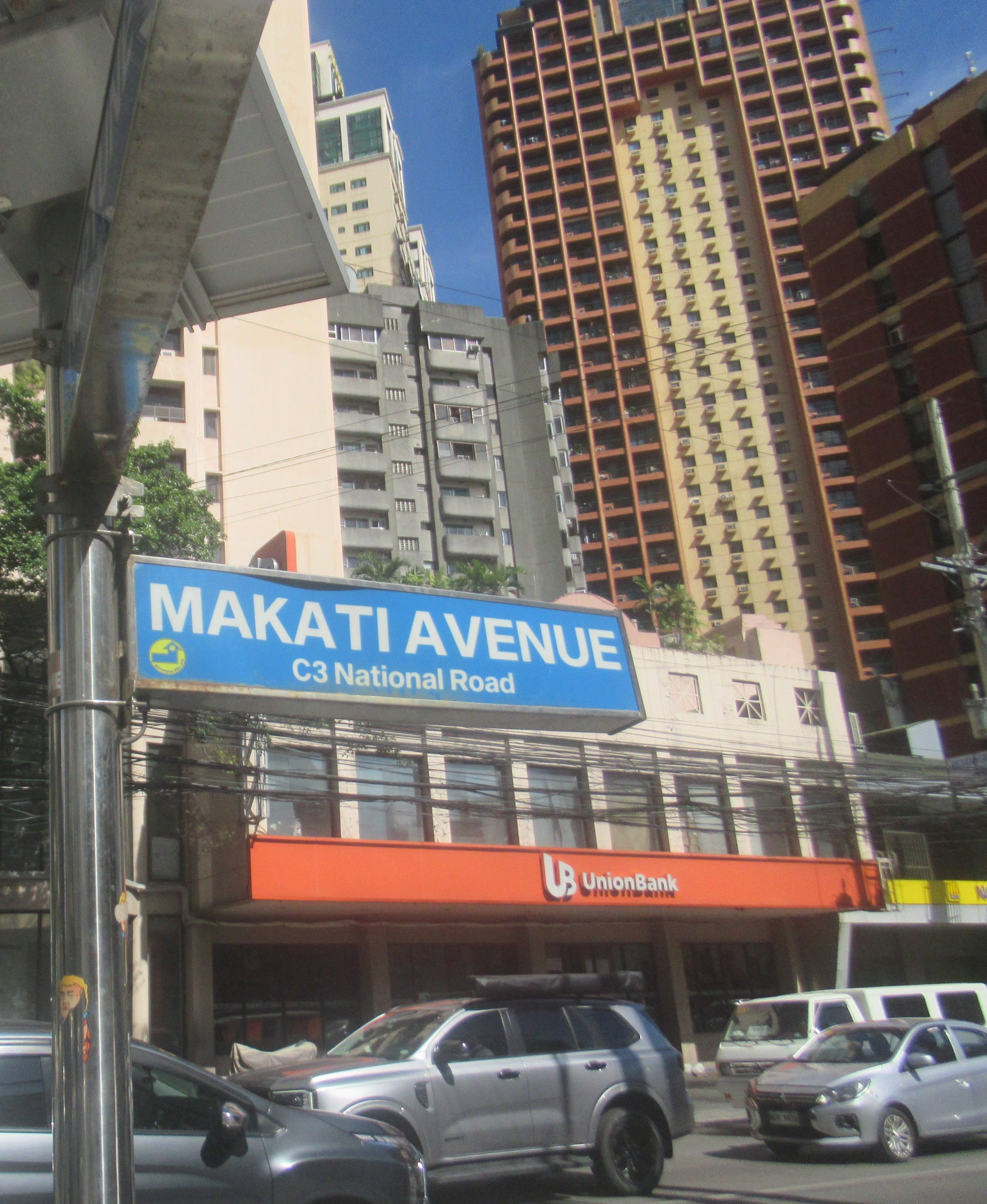
A street sign for Makati Avenue in Makati marked as "C3 National Road". Its segment north of Gil Puyat Avenue was proposed as part of the C-3 network but never formally materialized.

In the JICA-conducted study, the elevated Expressway Route C-3, was also planned as early as 1993 to traverse above the C-3 alignment from Navotas to Mandaluyong. Also, another proposal in the late 1990s, called the R-10/C-3 Expressway, totaling the length of 7.5 kilometers (4.7 mi) from the Metro Manila Skyway to the Manila North Harbor, with a solicited proposal submitted by the joint venture of the Philippine National Construction Corporation and Kværner of Norway. The completion of this project will allow cargo traffic to pass without being hampered by urban congestion. In 2003, JICA also conducted a study again on the elevated expressway under a planned public-private partnership, with a length of 16.59 kilometers (10.31 mi) (C-3 Expressway has a length of 8.99 kilometers (5.59 mi)), and in 2007, there are plans to extend the Metro Manila Skyway towards the port area as a linkage, but was only realized by the C-3–R-10 spur of NLEX Harbor Link and Skyway Stage 3 constructed and opened more than two decades later.

Another proposal for C-3 suggested a new alignment connecting N. Domingo Street to Hoover Street in San Juan, continuing to Makati via Gomezville Street, Nueve de Febrero Street, the present-day F. Martinez Avenue, Maysilo Circle, San Francisco Street, and Coronado Street in Mandaluyong, the Makati–Mandaluyong Bridge, and finally Makati Avenue and Gil Puyat Avenue in Makati.

== Route description ==
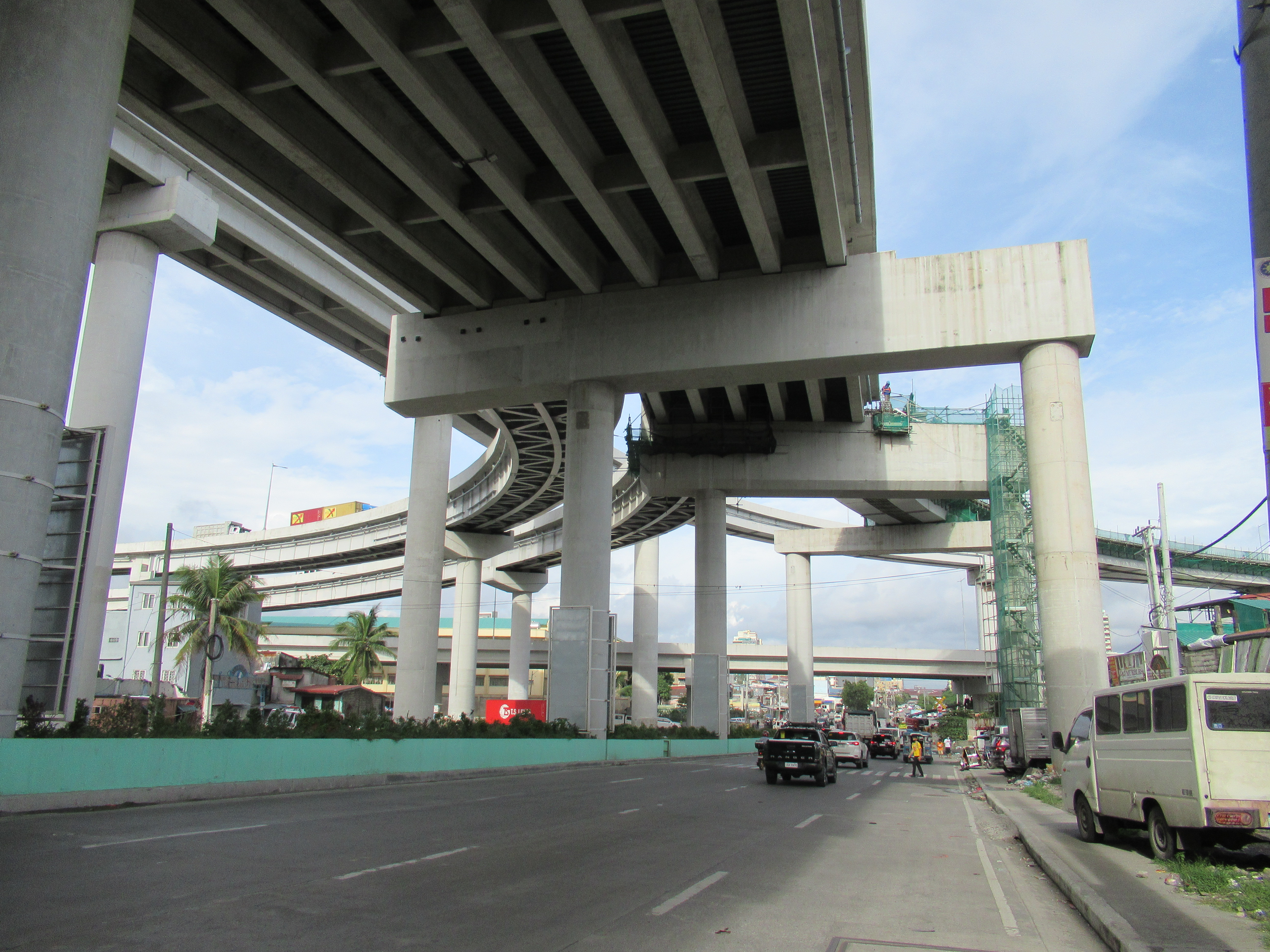
C-3 Road beneath Caloocan Interchange

=== C-3 Road ===
C-3 Road is the portion of C-3 from R-10 in Navotas to Baltazar Street, located past the Philippine National Railways railroad crossing and the Caloocan Interchange of the NLEX Harbor Link and Connector projects in Caloocan.

=== 5th Avenue ===
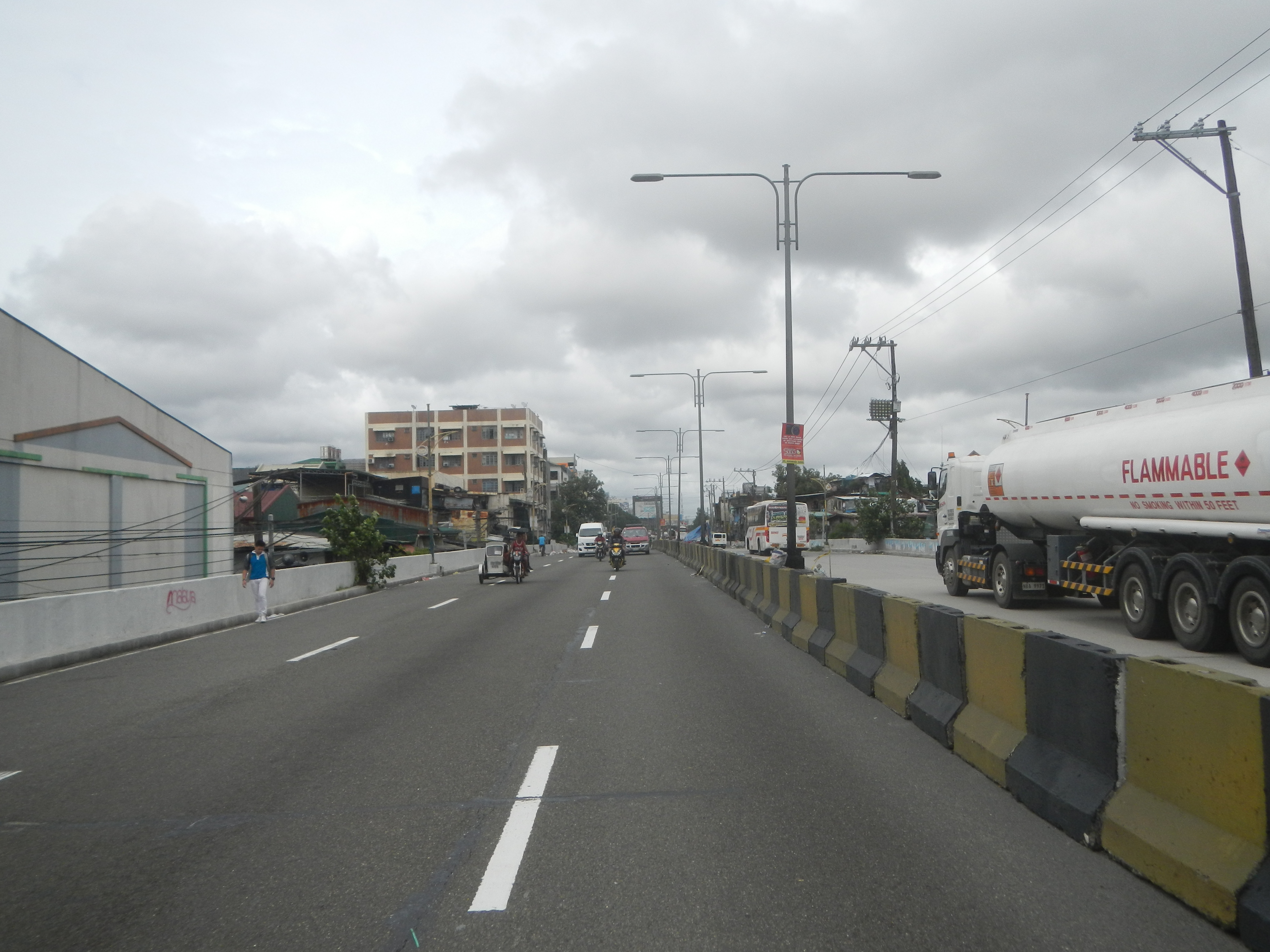
Westbound lane of 5th Avenue in Grace Park East, looking east

Past Baltazar Street, C-3 becomes 5th Avenue, a six-lane, two-way traffic roadway from Caloocan to A. Bonifacio Avenue in Quezon City. Before its expansion, this roadway was a two-lane, one-way traffic roadway eastwards. The expansion aimed to accommodate and connect C-3 Road (east) and C-3 Road (west) to eastbound and westbound traffic. Being the fifth avenue running east–west from the city's border with Manila in the south, it passes through the areas of Grace Park West, Grace Park East, and Barrio San Jose, as well as the northern boundary of La Loma Cemetery in Caloocan before entering Quezon City.

=== Sergeant Rivera Avenue ===
After crossing A. Bonifacio Avenue, C-3 becomes Sgt. Rivera Avenue, a main road in Quezon City with six lanes. Skyway's alignment over C-3 begins at this road. It becomes G. Araneta after turning southwards after its intersection with Santo Domingo Avenue. The names G. Araneta and Sgt. Rivera are often used interchangeably by people in this segment of the C-3.

=== Gregorio Araneta Avenue ===
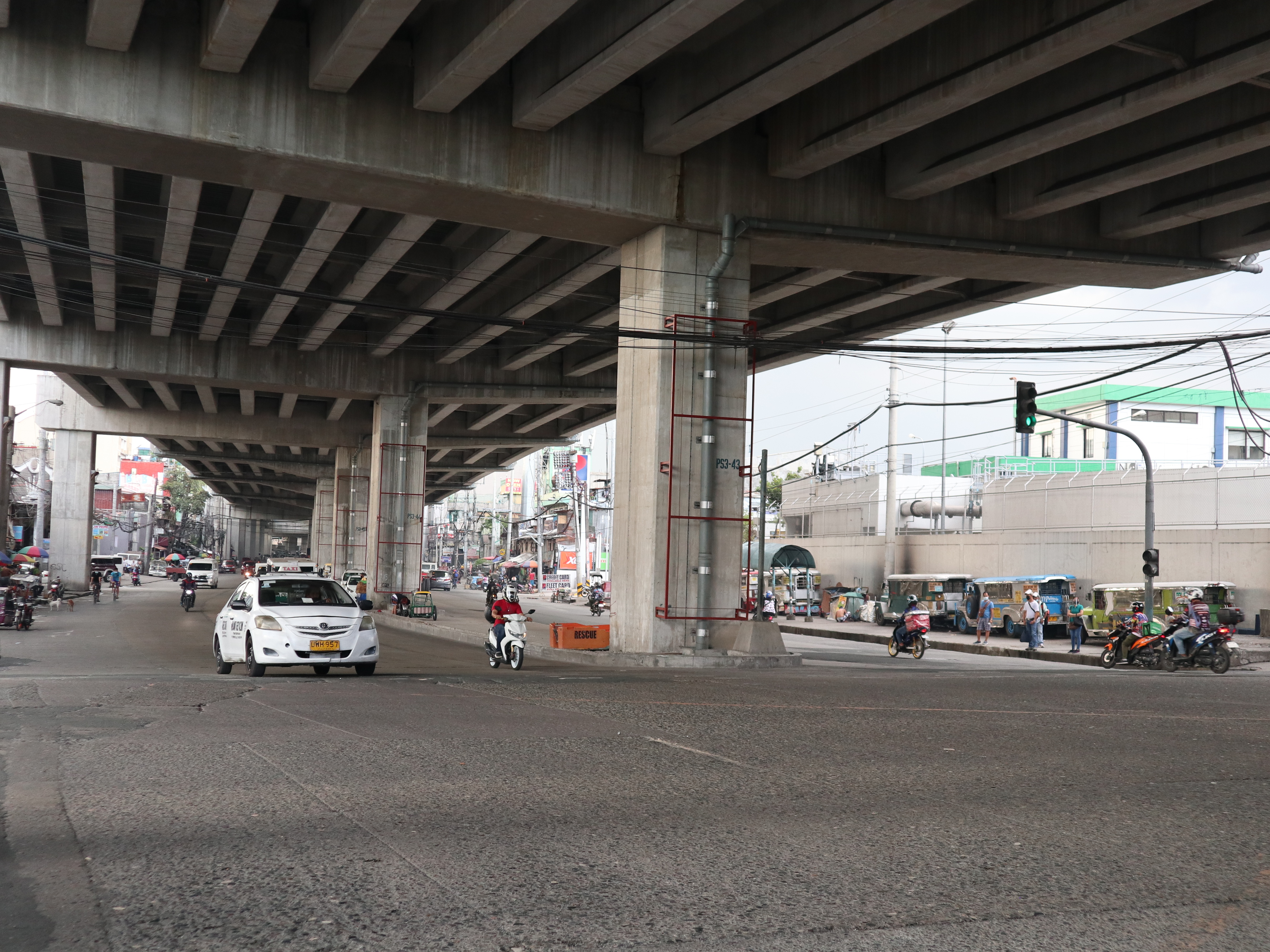
Gregorio Araneta Avenue

C-3 becomes G. Araneta Avenue after turning southwards after its intersection with Santo Domingo Avenue up to its terminus at N. Domingo Street in San Juan. This area of C-3 is well known for its big funeral parlors, such as Arlington and La Funeraria Paz, and SM City Sta. Mesa. It is also considered a flood-prone area as the lowest area in the C-3 network (the other being the area where it crosses with Aurora Boulevard). The Talayan Creek also runs along the road median from Toctocan Street to Quezon Avenue and is notorious for overflowing during the rainy season.
