= Jose Laurel Street =

Street in San Miguel, Manila

Coordinates: 14°21′11″N 120°35′35″E

- Jose P. Laurel Street; J.P. Laurel Street
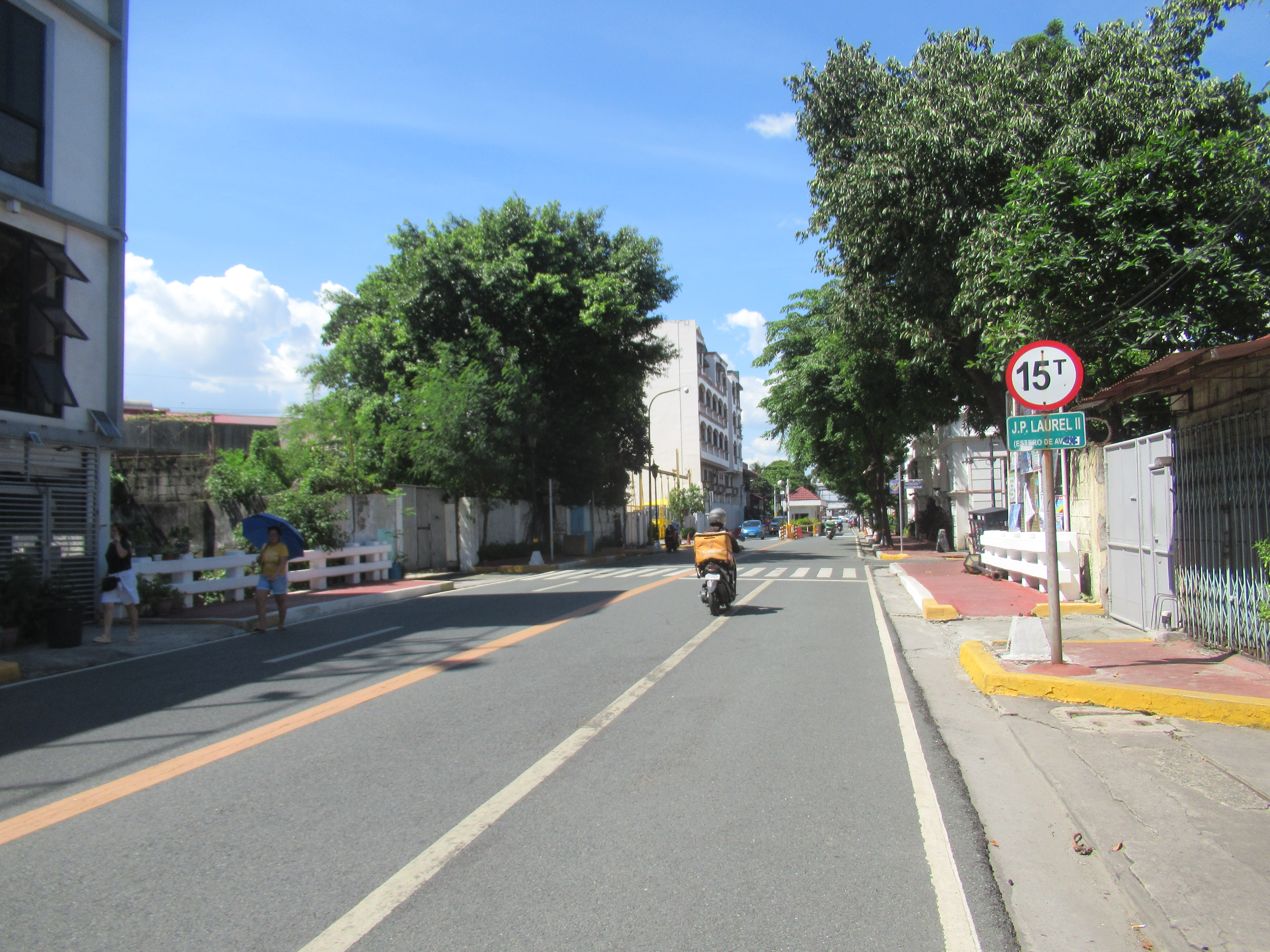
- Jose Laurel Street looking towards the gate near Nagtahan Interchange
- Interactive map of Jose Laurel Street
- Namesake: José P. Laurel
- Maintained by: Department of Public Works and Highways – North Manila District Engineering Office
- Length: 1.336 km (0.830 mi)
- Location: San Miguel, Manila
- West end: Nicanor Padilla Street & General Solano Street
- East end: N140 (Lacson Avenue & Nagtahan Street) / N180 (Legarda Street & Magsaysay Boulevard) at Nagtahan Interchange

Jose Laurel Street is a tree-lined street in the district of San Miguel in north-central Manila, Philippines. It runs parallel to the Pasig River from the Nagtahan Interchange south-westwards to Ayala Bridge. It is where Malacañang Palace and several other government buildings are located.

The street has had several different names in different segments throughout the years, including Calzada de San Miguel, Calle de Malacañang (west of Estero de Aviles or present-day San Rafael Street), and Calzada/Calle de Uliuli (east of Estero de Aviles). However, by the 1870s, it was known as Calle conde de Avilés. It was named after Don José Vicente Menéndez de Avilés, count of Avilés, who financed the extension of the street to the Rotonda de Sampaloc, which is now the Nagtahan Interchange. A small plaza across Malacañang Palace was also named after Áviles. It was also one of the right-of-way alignments of the tranvía that existed until 1945. In 1959, the street was renamed to its present name in honor of former President José Paciano Laurel.

Other notable buildings along the street include Casa Roces, the College of the Holy Spirit, the National Shrine of Saint Jude, the National Shrine of Saint Michael and the Archangels and the Philippine Commission on Women. Public access to Laurel Street is generally restricted for security reasons. The nearest LRT Line 2 station is Legarda station.

== Gallery ==
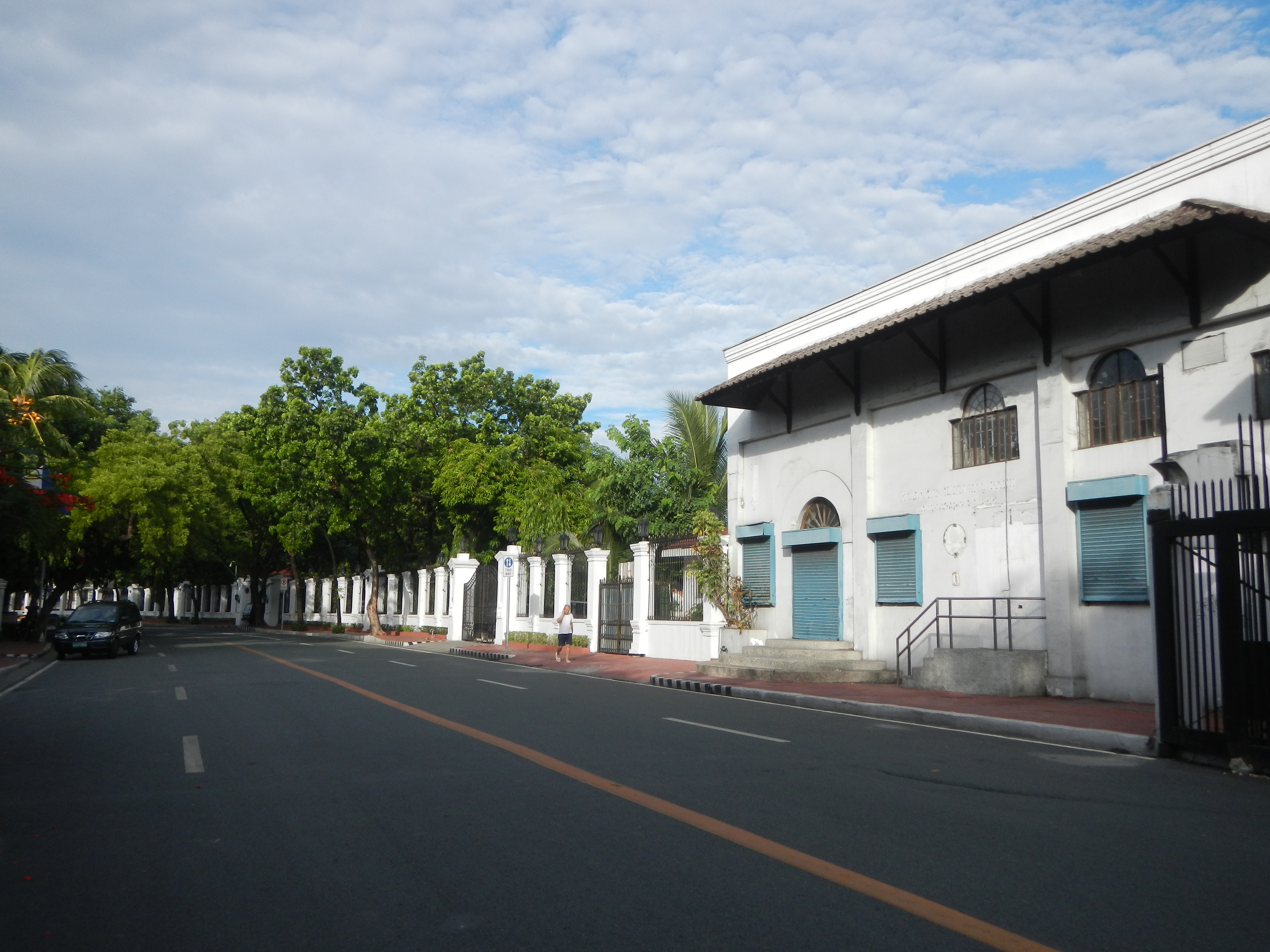
Jose Laurel Street's western gate near the National Shrine of Saint Michael and the Archangels

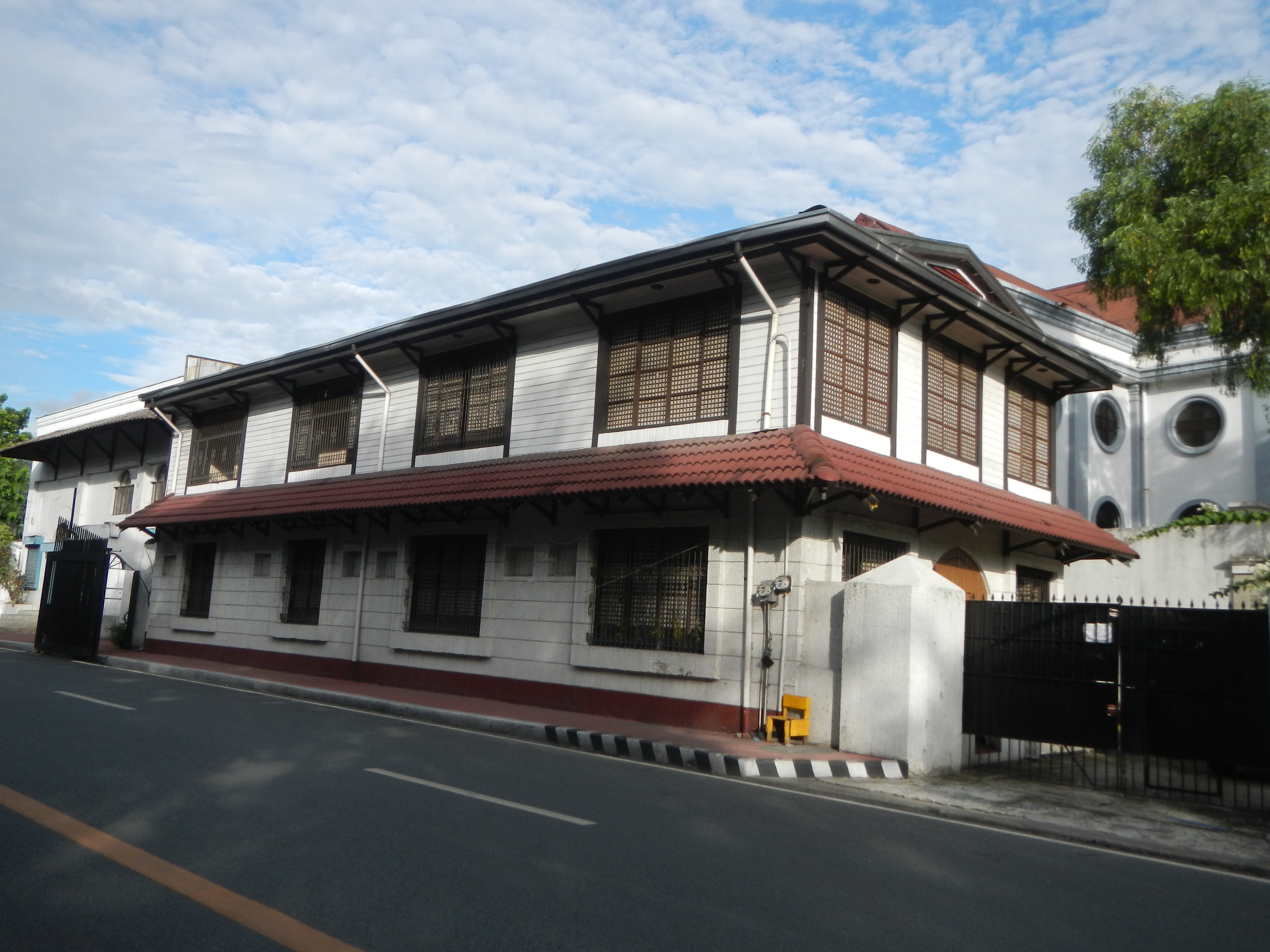
Old house

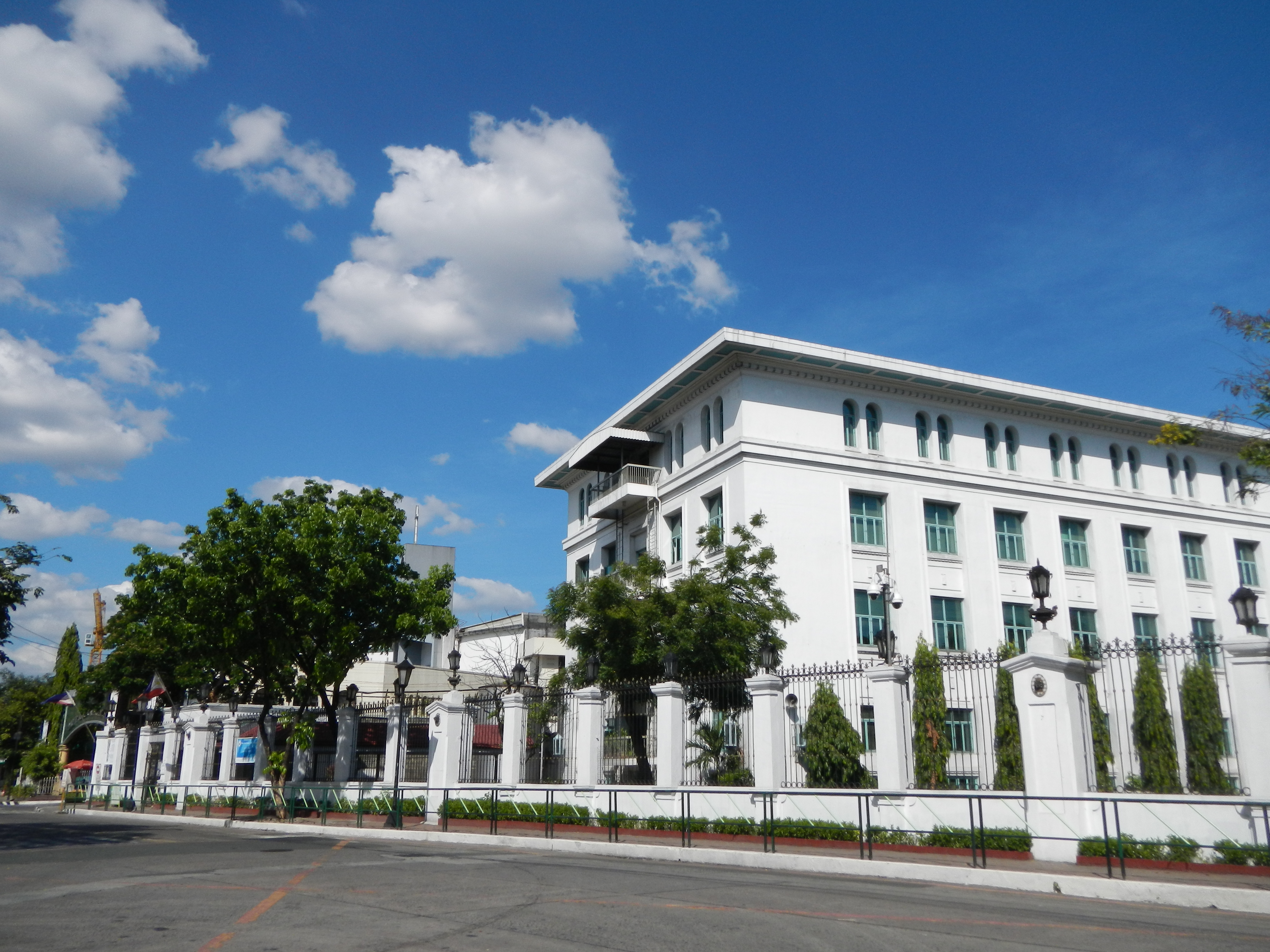
The Mabini Hall of the Malacañang Palace complex at 1000 Jose Laurel Street

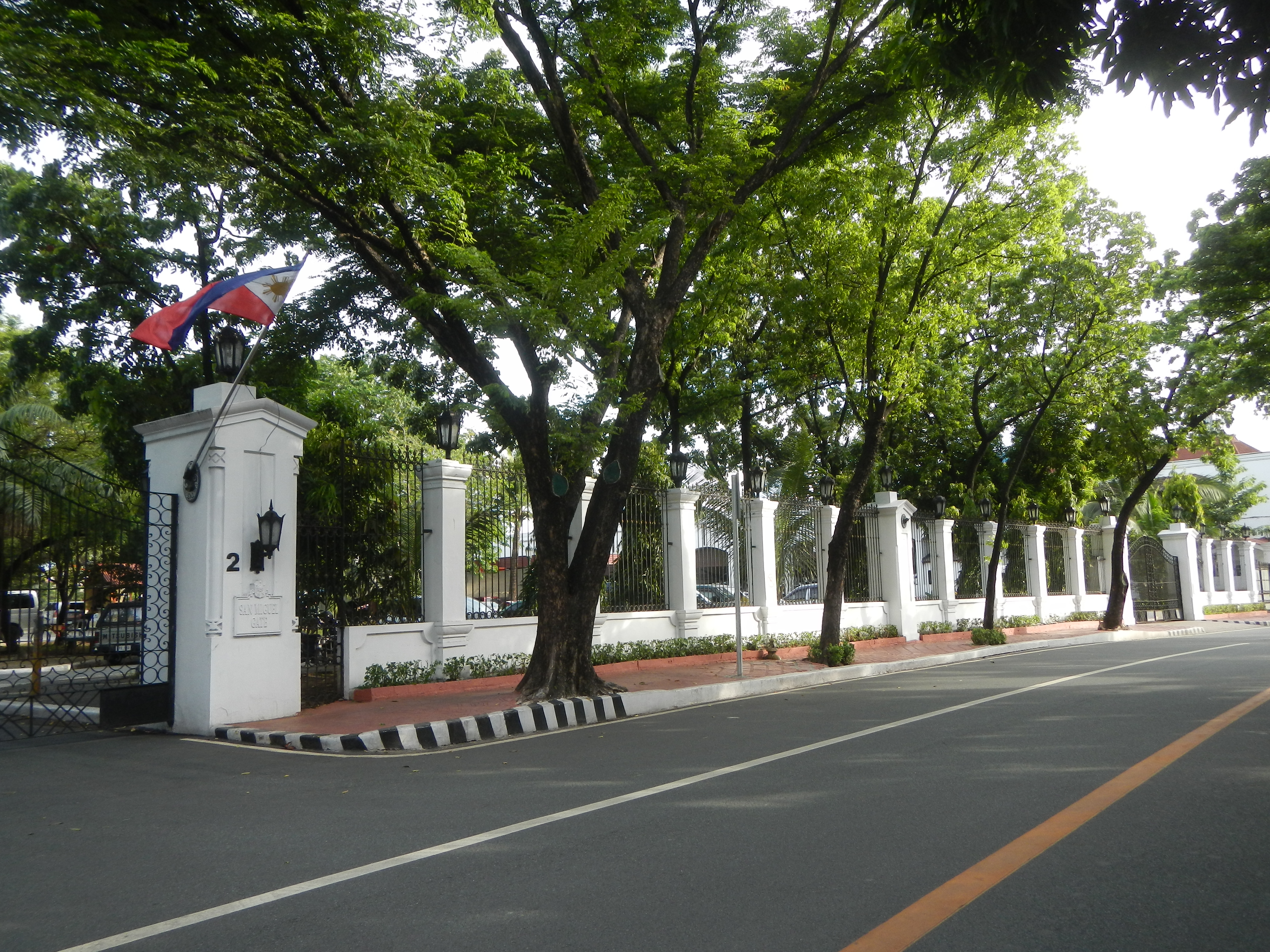
Fences of the Malacañang Palace along Jose Laurel Street

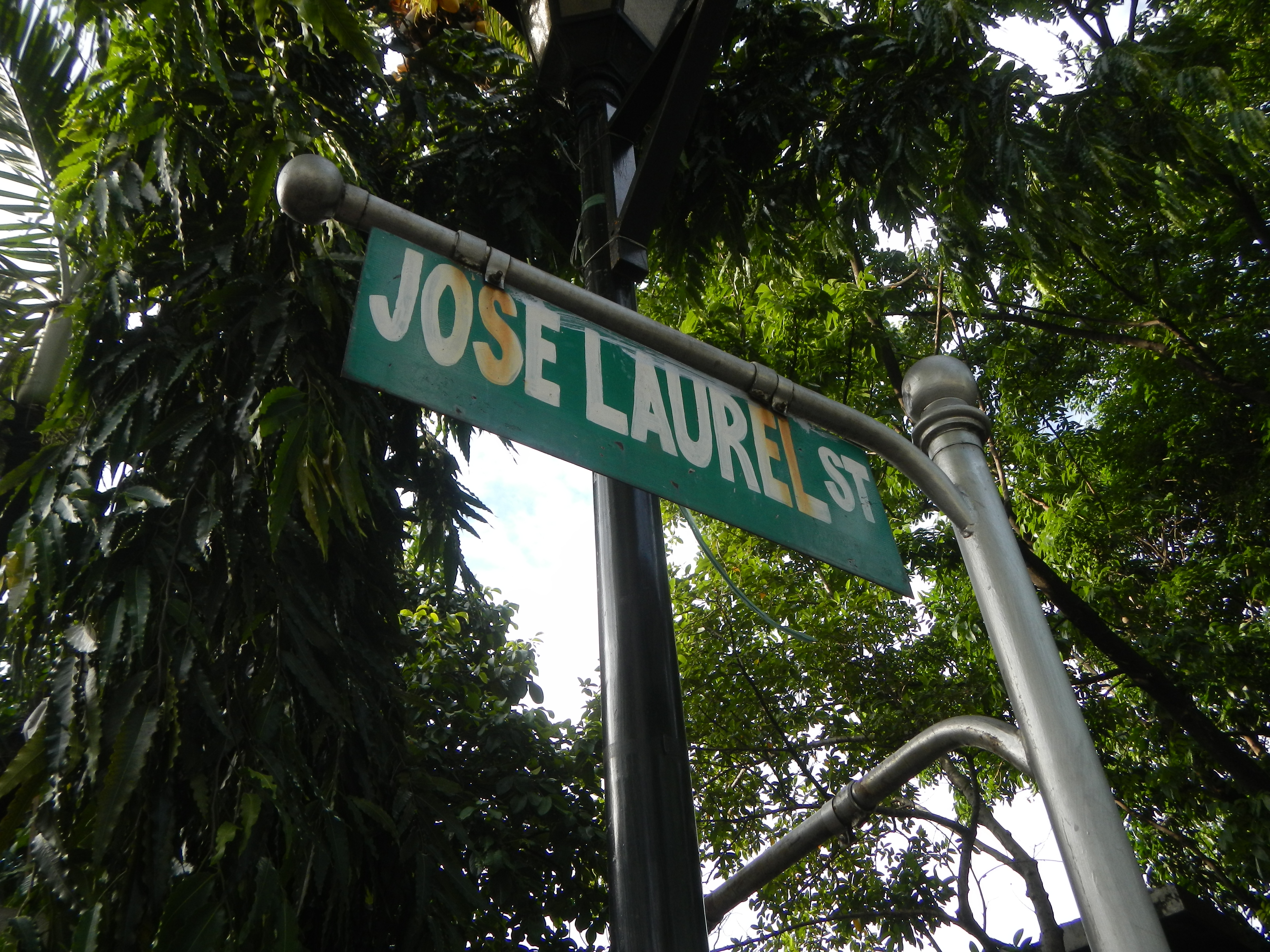
Street sign

== See also ==
- Mendiola Street
- List of eponymous streets in Manila
