= Nagtahan Interchange =

Street junction in Manila, Philippines

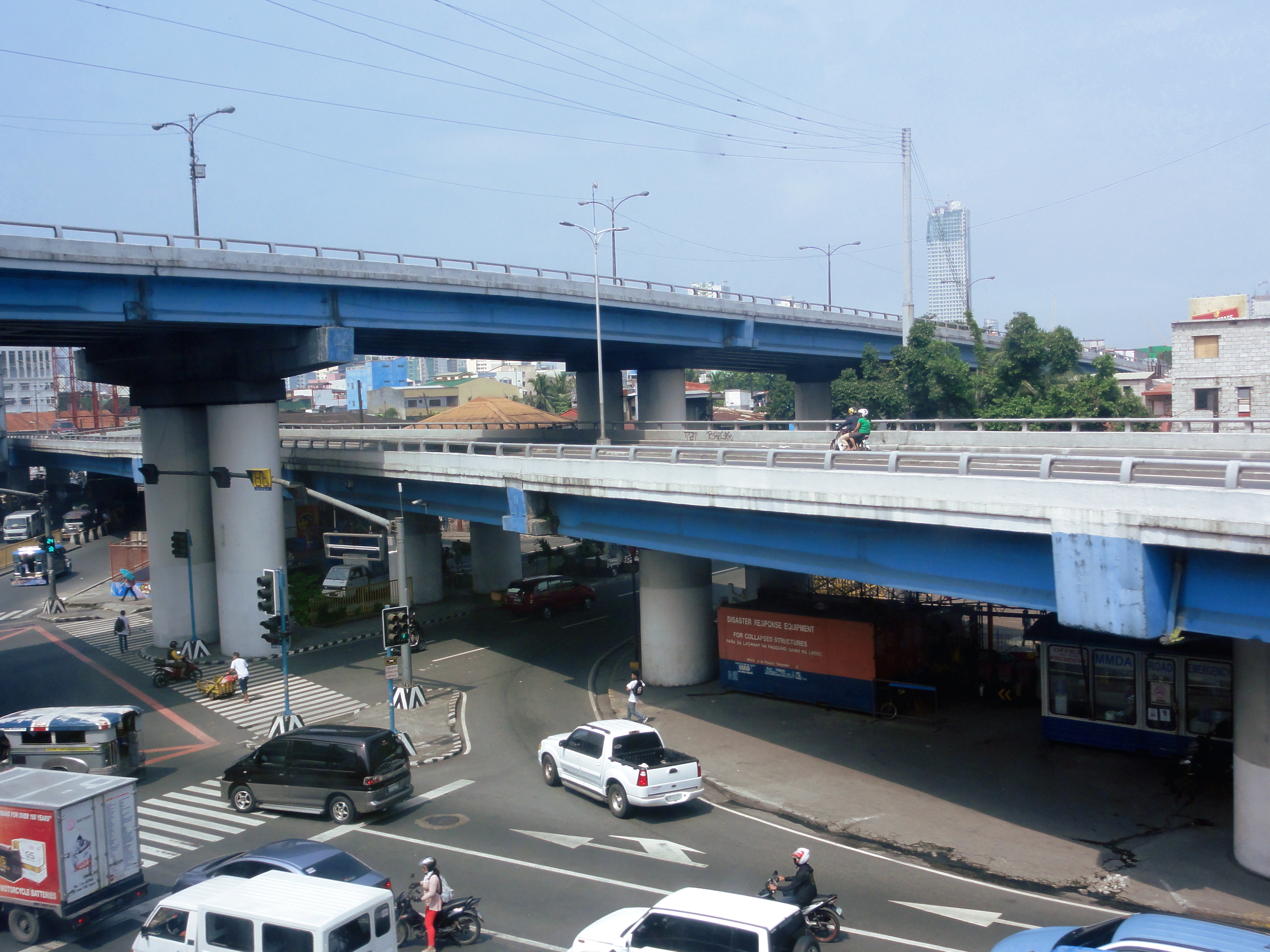
- The Nagtahan Interchange in 2014
- Interactive map of Nagtahan Interchange

Location
- Manila, Philippines
- Coordinates: 14°36′03.9″N 120°59′57.6″E
- Roads at junction: N140 (Lacson Avenue / Nagtahan Street); N180 (Legarda Street / Magsaysay Boulevard); Jose P. Laurel Street

Construction
- Type: Three-level set of intersecting flyovers
- Constructed: 1991–1992
- Opened: March 1992
- Maintained by: Department of Public Works and Highways

The Nagtahan Interchange, also known as the Nagtahan Flyover and the Mabini Flyover, is a three-level set of three intersecting flyovers in Manila, Philippines, which serves as the junction between Lacson Avenue, Nagtahan Street, Legarda Street, Magsaysay Boulevard, and Jose P. Laurel Street, as well as the nearby Mabini Bridge. The interchange includes the Legarda Flyover (also known as the R. Magsaysay Flyover), between Legarda Street and Magsaysay Boulevard, and the Nagtahan Flyover (also known as the Mabini Flyover), between Nagtahan Street and Lacson Avenue.

== History ==
Straddling the boundary of Sampaloc, Santa Mesa, and San Miguel, the interchange was originally the Rotonda de Sampaloc, a roundabout which, at the turn of the 20th century, marked the boundary between Manila's urban core and its suburbs. At the center was the Carriedo Fountain, built in 1884 to commemorate the inauguration of Manila's waterworks system. However, in 1976, the Rotonda de Sampaloc was cleared due to traffic congestion, and the Carriedo Fountain was moved, first to the headquarters of the Metropolitan Waterworks and Sewerage System in Diliman, Quezon City, and eventually to Plaza Santa Cruz in Santa Cruz, Manila, where it remains today.

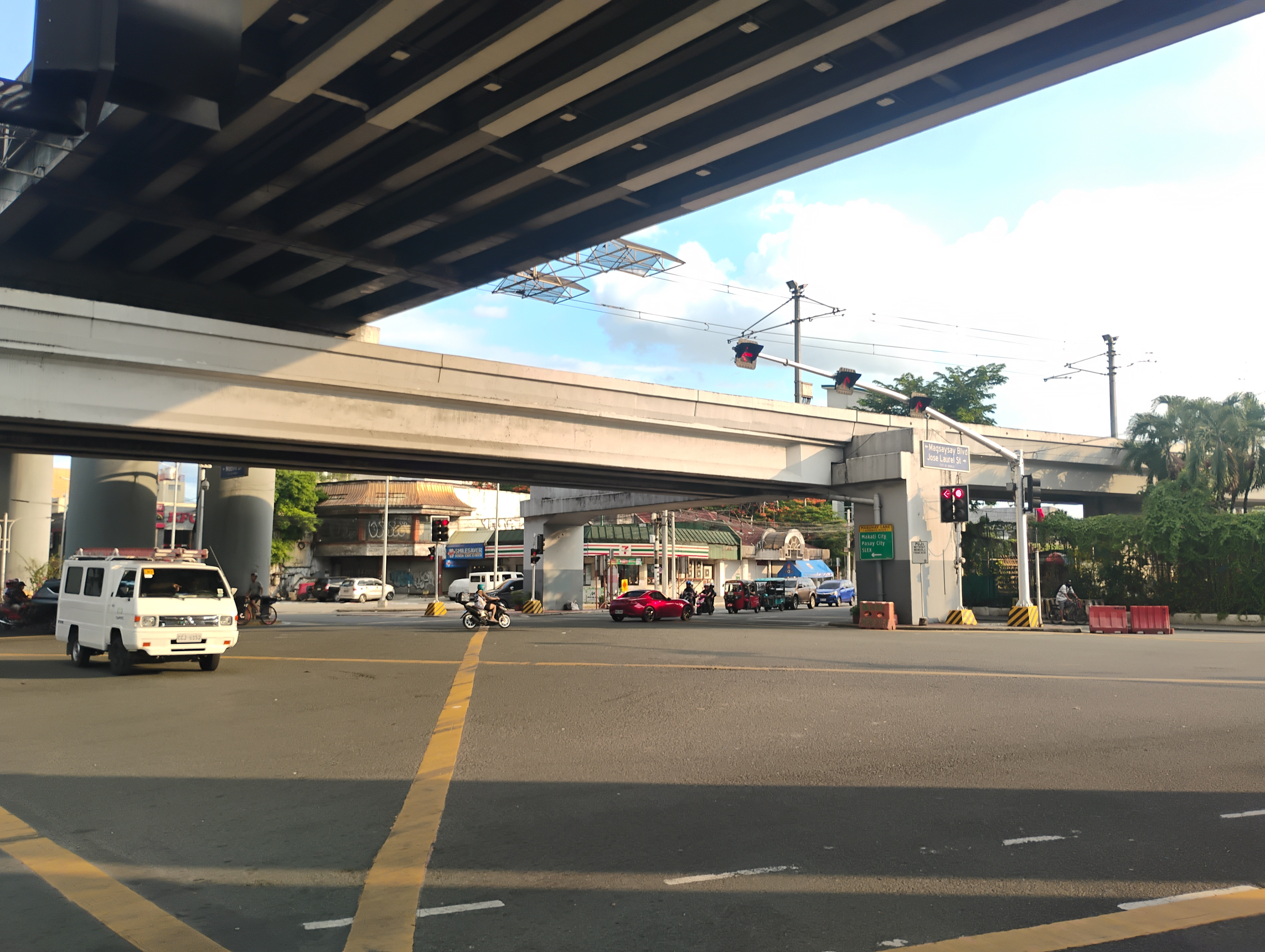
Ground level of Nagtahan Interchange

The eventual construction of the interchange was driven by the need to alleviate continuing severe traffic congestion along the Circumferential Road 2 corridor. In February 1990, the administration of President Corazon Aquino signed an agreement with Japan to fund the construction of two interchanges, including the Nagtahan Interchange, using Japanese official development assistance funds. The project was later certified as urgent by the Aquino administration, which allowed it to proceed quickly with construction, and the near-¥1.6 billion (₱257.58 million) interchange began construction in May 1991. The completed interchange was opened to traffic in March 1992, ten months ahead of schedule.

A subsequent study by the Japan International Cooperation Agency issued in 2001 shows that in the nine years since the Nagtahan Interchange was constructed, traffic flows improved considerably despite the doubling in the number of cars on Metro Manila roads in that same time frame. However, there were concerns that underinvestment in its maintenance would be detrimental to any major rehabilitation work to take place when the need arises.

=== Repairs ===
On October 1, 2021, the Department of Public Works and Highways commenced the rehabilitation of Nagtahan Flyover, resulting in partial closure and restricted access to light vehicles only.

On July 6, 2024, the Legarda Flyover was partially closed for repairs, focusing on 19 units of damaged expansion joints. The project is scheduled for completion by November 6, 2024.

== Artwork ==
In 2013, students from various universities in Metro Manila re-touched the murals of prominent national heroes painted along the stone column of the Nagtahan Interchange. The project was undertaken by the Metropolitan Manila Development Authority, which aimed to create awareness of Filipino history and culture.
