= Legarda Street =

Street in Manila, Philippines

Coordinates: 14°36′2″N 120°59′42″E

R-6 C-1

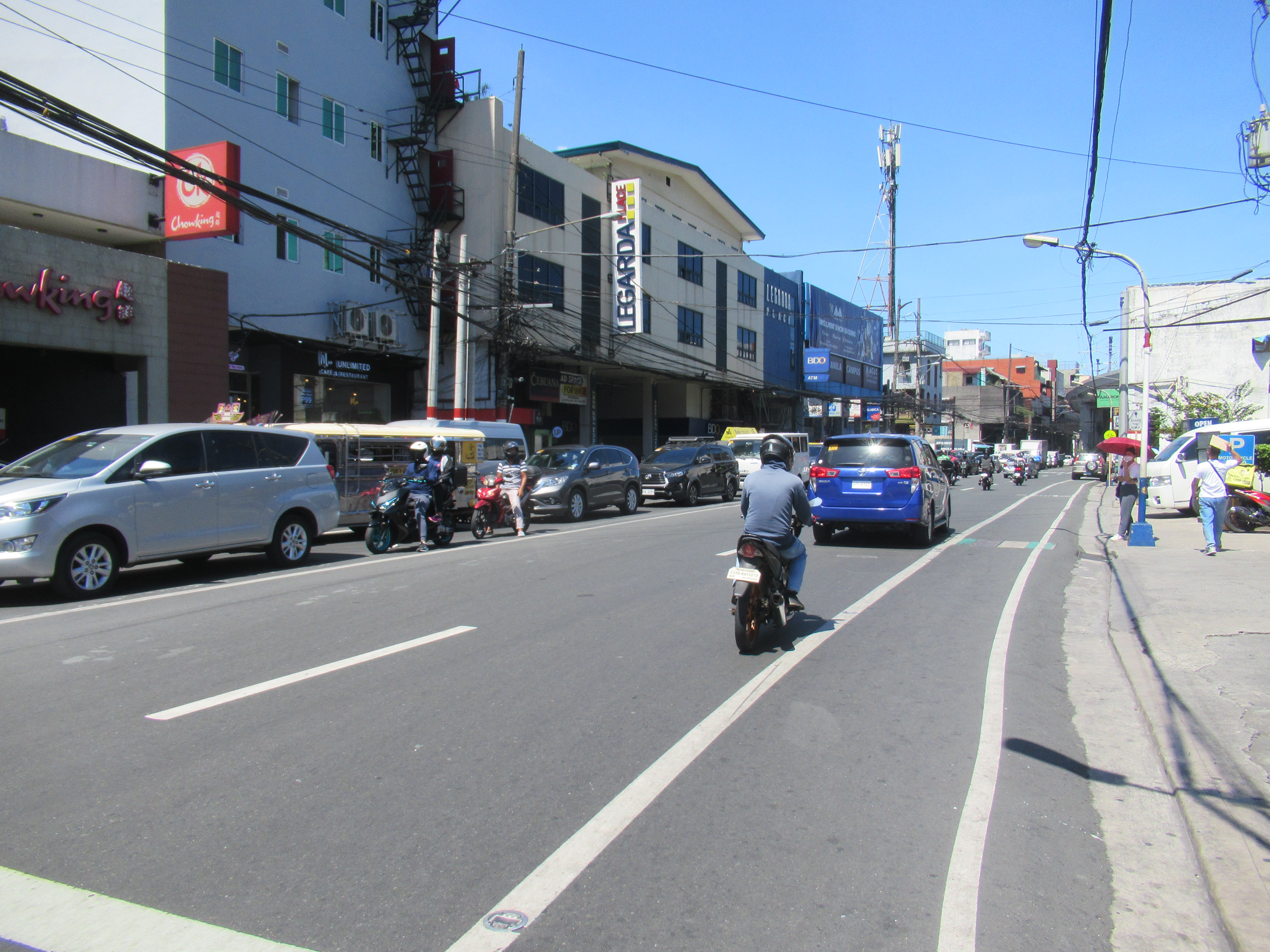
- Legarda Street eastbound in Sampaloc

- The route of Legarda Street in Metro Manila. Legarda Street is highlighted in red.
- Former names: Calle Alix; Plaza Santa Ana; Calle Concordia
- Part of: R-6 R-6 in Sampaloc; C-1 C-1 in Quiapo; N180
- Namesake: Benito Legarda; José María Alix y Bonache (formerly)
- Length: 1.4 km (0.87 mi)
- Location: Manila
- East end: N140 (Lacson Avenue / Nagtahan Street) / N180 (Magsaysay Boulevard) / Jose P. Laurel Street at Nagtahan Interchange
- Major junctions: N145 (Recto Avenue) / Mendiola Street
- West end: N180 (Nepomuceno Street) in Quiapo

Legarda Street is a short street in the Sampaloc district of Manila, Philippines. It crosses through the eastern section of the University Belt area in a generally east–west orientation between the Nagtahan Interchange and the intersection with Nepomuceno Street in Quiapo. Legarda station of the LRTA's Line 2 system serves it.

The street was named after Filipino legislator and resident commissioner to the United States, Benito Legarda y Tuason. Historically, its section in Sampaloc was formerly called Calle Alix (after a Real Audiencia of Manila magistrate of the 1860s, José María Alix y Bonache), while its section in Quiapo was formerly called Plaza Santa Ana and Calle Concordia, respectively.

== Route ==
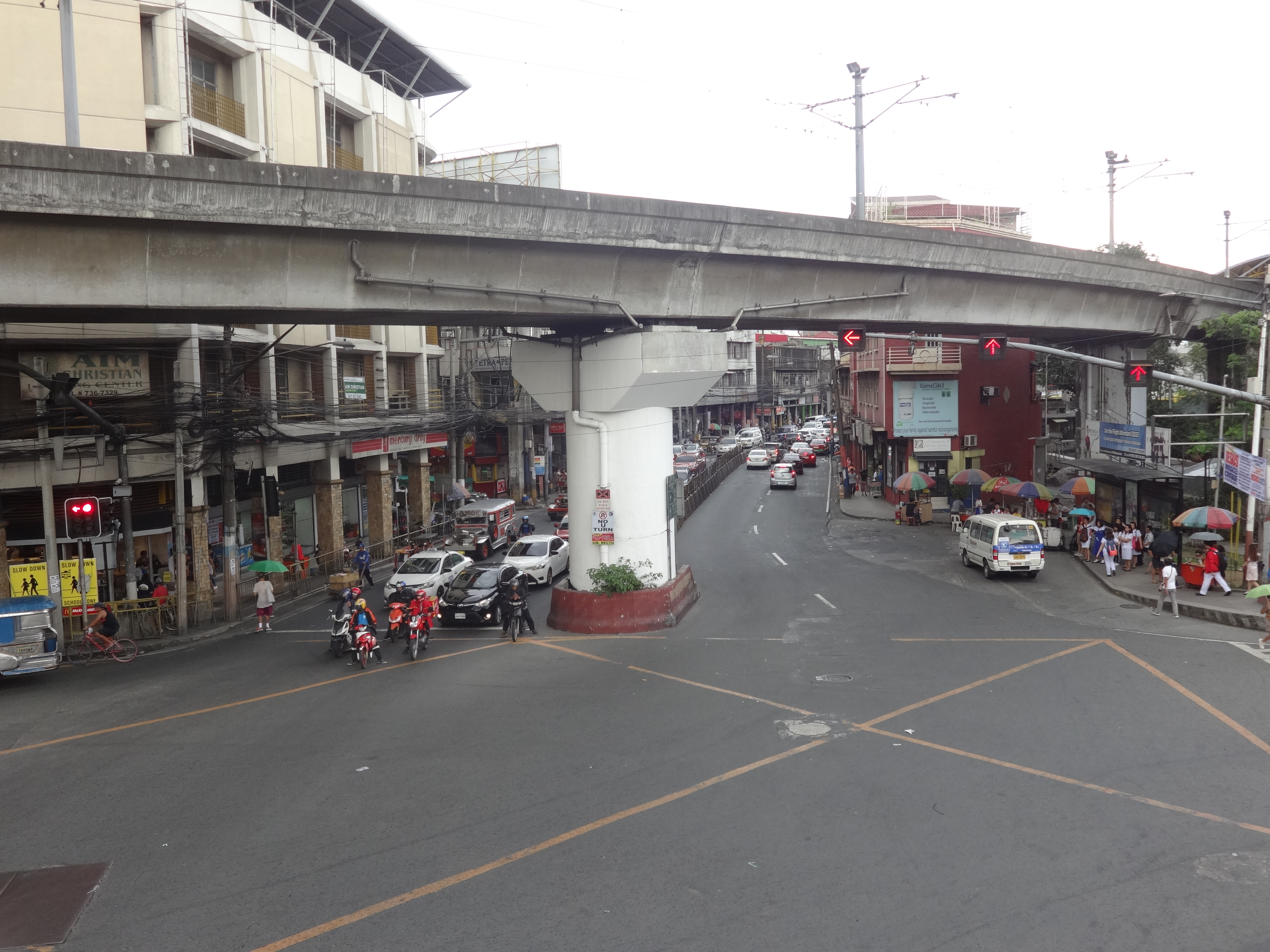
Intersection of Legarda with Recto Avenue and Mendiola Street

Legarda Street commences at the Nagtahan Interchange as a westward continuation of Magsaysay Boulevard from Santa Mesa. It heads due west, traversing the southern edge of Sampaloc and skirting the northern boundary of San Miguel. After crossing Figueras Street, Legarda bends to the southwest, following the course of Estero de San Miguel (San Miguel Creek). It intersects with Recto Avenue–Mendiola Street, wherein the majority of its traffic turns towards Recto Avenue, serving as a major continuation westward, and San Rafael Street before terminating and briefly converging with the junction at Nepomuceno Street (formerly Tanduay Street) in Quiapo before it is continued by P. Casal Street towards San Miguel and Ayala Bridge to Ermita on the southern bank of the Pasig River.

Notable establishments on Legarda Street include Arellano University, Santa Catalina College, the main campus of ABE International Business College, San Lorenzo Ruiz Student Catholic Center, Mendiola Theater and the Department of Social Welfare and Development–NCR Office.

== History ==
On May 1, 2001, Legarda Street was the site of riots initiated by pro-Estrada protesters being pushed back from Malacañang Palace by police authorities during EDSA III.

== Intersections ==
The entire route is located in Manila.

km	mi	Destinations	Notes
		N180 (Nepomuceno Street)	Western terminus.
		Cruzada Street	Eastbound only
		San Rafael Street	Unsignalized intersection
		N145 (Recto Avenue) / Mendiola Street	Traffic light intersection. No left turn from westbound; transition from C-1 to R-6
		F. Dalupan Street (Gastambide Street)	Westbound only
		M. V. Delos Santos Street	Westbound only
		D. Santiago Street	Westbound only
		Delgado Street	Westbound only
		Main Street	Westbound only
		Legarda Station Access Road (entrance)	Eastbound only; access to Legarda station
		J. Figueras Street (Bustillos Street)	Traffic light intersection
		Manrique Street	Westbound only
		Legarda Station Access Road (exit)	Eastbound only
		M.F. Jhocson Street	Westbound only
		West end of Legarda Flyover	
		Sta. Teresita Street	Westbound only
4.205	2.613	N140 (Lacson Avenue / Nagtahan Street) / Jose P. Laurel Street	Nagtahan Interchange. Eastern terminus; traffic light intersection. Continues eastward as N180 (Magsaysay Boulevard).
1.000 mi = 1.609 km; 1.000 km = 0.621 mi: Incomplete access; Route transition

== Landmarks ==
From west to east:

- Santa Catalina College
- Arellano University
- ABE International Business College
- University of Manila
- San Sebastian College – Recoletos
- San Sebastian Church (Manila)
- National Teachers College
- Technological Institute of the Philippines

== See also ==
- Mendiola Street
- Recto Avenue
- University Belt
- Media related to Legarda Street (Manila) at Wikimedia Commons
