= Lacson Avenue =

Major thoroughfare in Manila, Philippines

Coordinates: 14°36′42″N 120°59′26″E

C-2

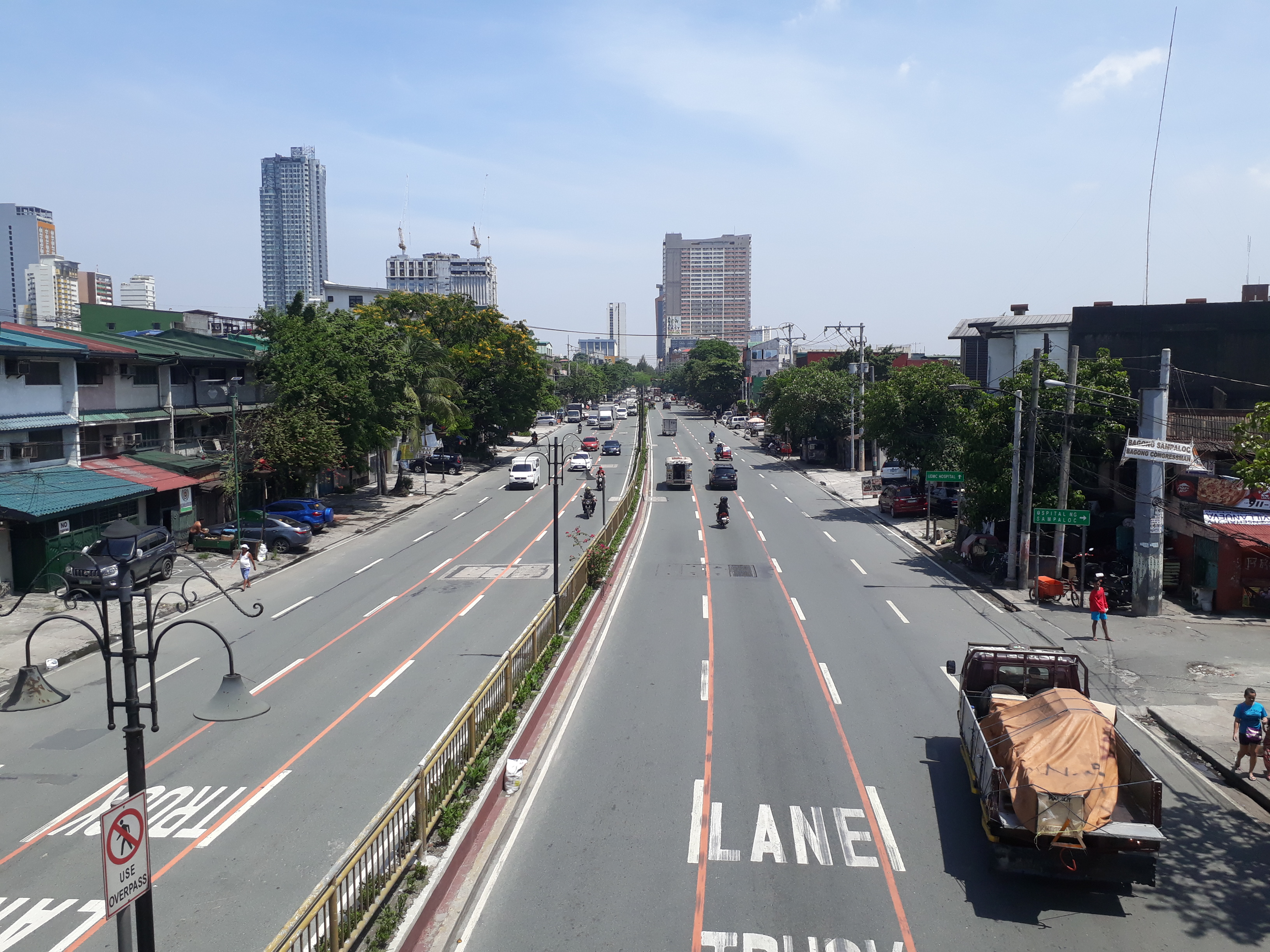
- Lacson Avenue looking northwest in Sampaloc, Manila
- Interactive map of Lacson Avenue
- Former name: Governor Forbes Street (Forbes Street)
- Namesake: Arsenio H. Lacson; William Cameron Forbes (formerly)
- Length: 2.9 km (1.8 mi)
- Component highways: From Tayuman to Nagtahan: C-2 C-2; N140
- Location: Manila
- North end: Yuseco and Oroquieta Streets in Santa Cruz
- Major junctions: N140 (Tayuman Street); N162 (Dimasalang Street); N170 (España Boulevard)
- South end: N180 (Legarda Street / Magsaysay Boulevard) at Nagtahan Interchange

Lacson Avenue (also known as Arsenio H. Lacson Avenue and formerly known as Governor Forbes Street) is the principal northwest–southeast artery in the Sampaloc district in northern Manila, Philippines. It is a 6-8 lane median divided avenue that runs approximately 2.9 kilometers (1.8 mi) from Tayuman Street in Santa Cruz to Nagtahan Interchange. It is a component of Circumferential Road 2 of the Manila arterial road network and N140 of the Philippine highway network.

== Route description ==
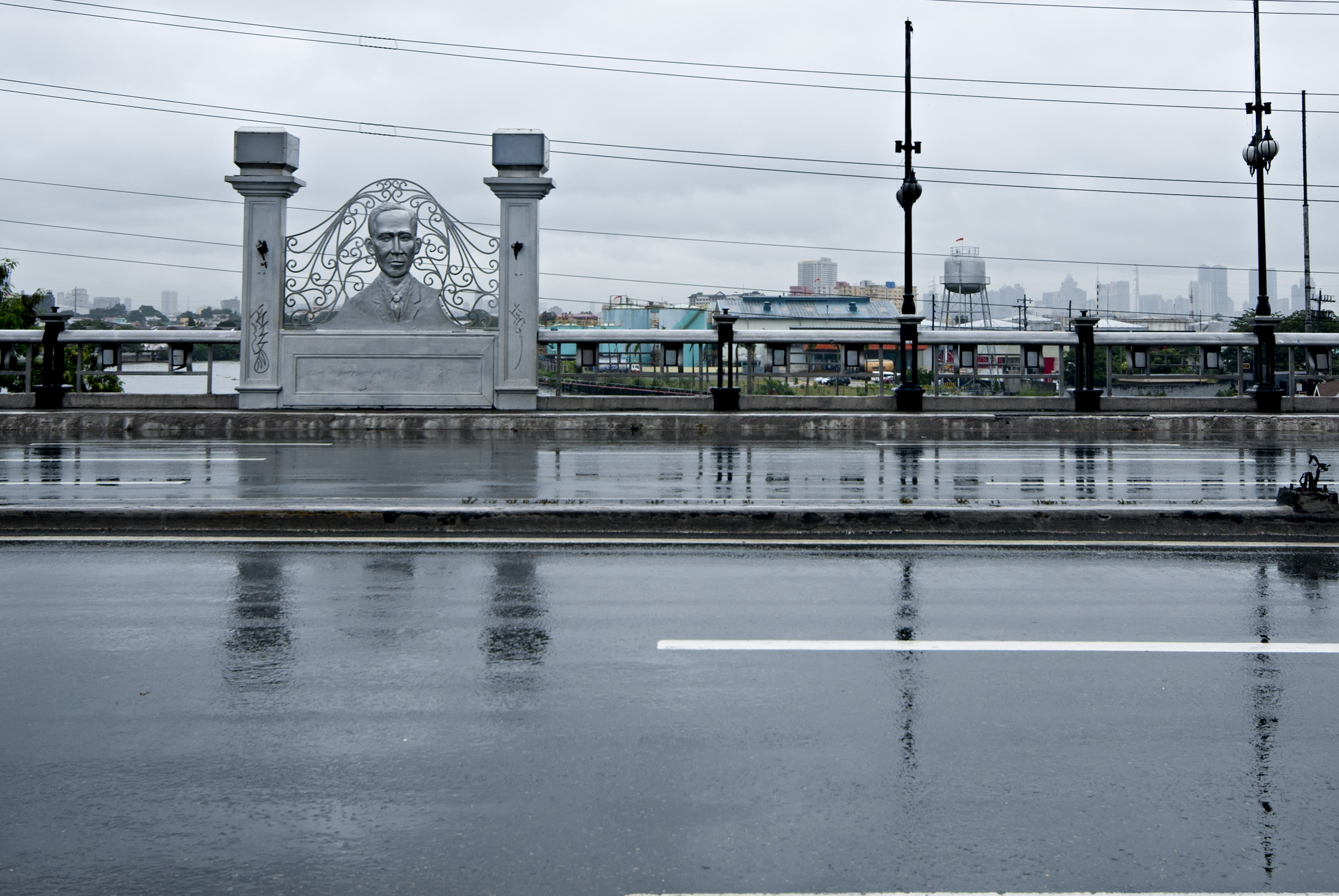
Mabini Bridge

Travelling south, traffic emerges from Yuseco Street at the junction with Oroquieta Street in Santa Cruz. It then widens as it crosses Tayuman and Consuelo Streets across SM City San Lazaro. From here, it becomes a component of Circumferential Road 2 (C-2) and the N140 highway. The road then intersects with Dimasalang Street and España Boulevard in Sampaloc, passing the University of Santo Tomas campus. The southern end of Lacson lies at the Nagtahan Interchange, where it continues south as Nagtahan Street towards Nagtahan Bridge and the districts of Pandacan, Paco, and Malate, where C-2 terminates as Quirino Avenue.

== History ==
The avenue was originally named Forbes Street or Governor Forbes Street, after William Cameron Forbes, governor-general of the Philippines, under whose administration the road was begun. It was extended north to meet Calle Tayabas (now Yuseco) and Calle Oroquieta in Santa Cruz and south to meet Calle Nagtahan (Nagtahan Street) at the boundary of Sampaloc, San Miguel and Santa Mesa at the old Carriedo Rotonda when the pontoon bridge of Nagtahan that connected it to Pandacan south of the Pasig River was built. Nagtahan Bridge was renamed to Mabini Bridge in 1967, while in 1971, Governor Forbes Street was renamed after Arsenio Lacson, who had served as the mayor of Manila from 1952 to 1962.

== Landmarks ==
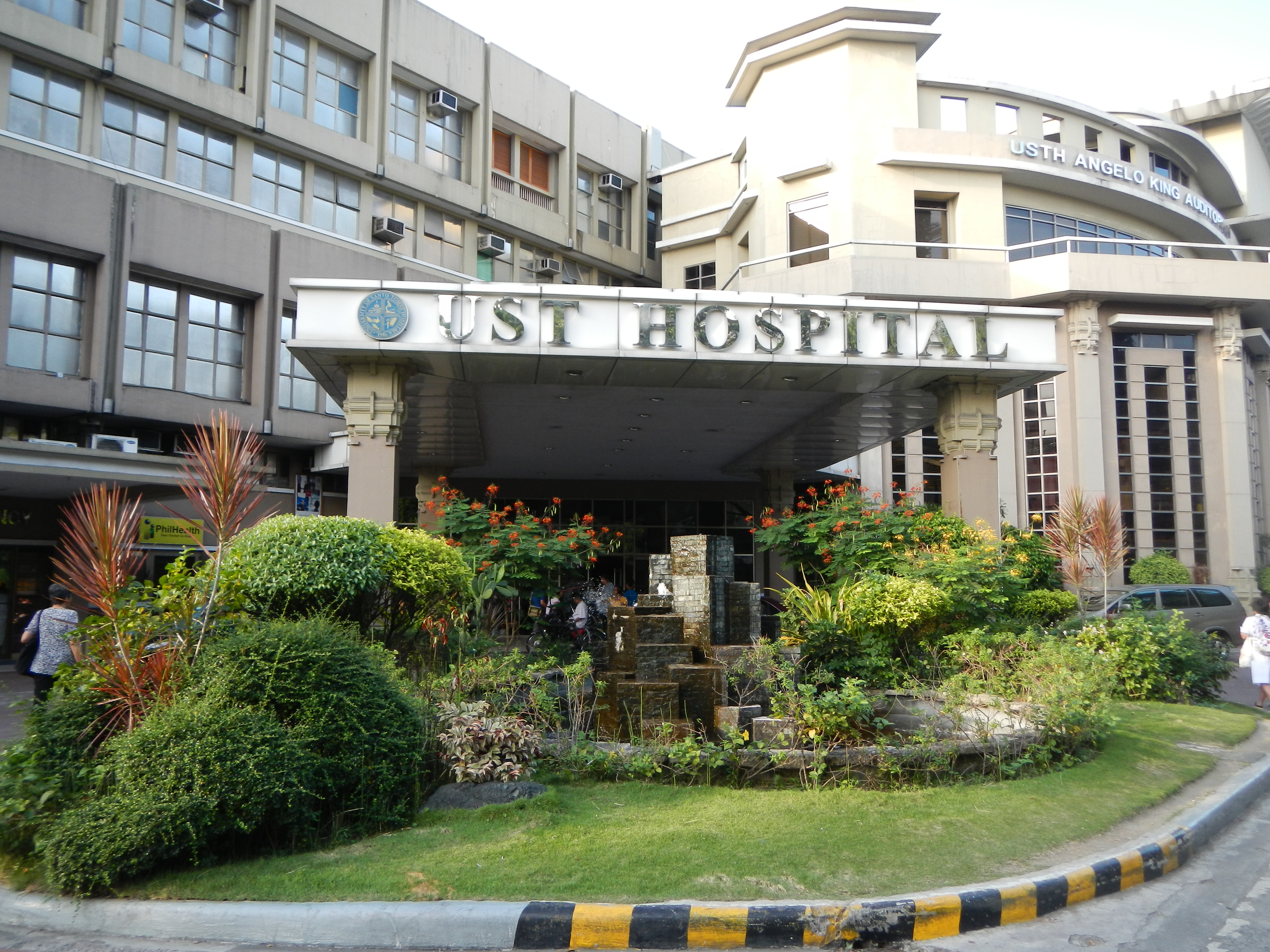
University of Santo Tomas Hospital

These are ordered from its western end at Yuseco Street to its eastern end at Nagtahan Interchange:

- SM City San Lazaro
- Andalucia Basketball Court
- Dangwa flower market
- Hospital of the Infant Jesus (corner Laong Laan)
- Mercury Drug (corner Laong Laan)
- University of Santo Tomas
- University of Santo Tomas Hospital
- Dominican School of Manila
- Sampaloc Fire Station
- SM Savemore Nagtahan

== Intersections ==
The entire route is located in Manila.

km	mi	Destinations	Notes
		Yuseco Street, Oroquieta Street	Northern terminus. Unsignaled intersection. Continues westward as Yuseco Street. Access to N150 (Rizal Avenue). Oroquieta Street is a one-way road.
		Manuel Hizon Street	Unsignaled intersection.
		Felix Huertas Road, S. Herrera Street	Unsignaled intersection.
		N140 (Tayuman Street)	Southbound only. Start of N140 and C-2 designations.
		Consuelo Street	Northbound only.
		Kalimbas Street	Southbound only.
		Alfonso Mendoza Street, Aragon Street	Traffic light intersection. Access to Quiapo via N170 (Quezon Boulevard); no left turn allowed from southbound.
		Maria Clara Street	Traffic light intersection. One-way road providing access to N162 (Dimasalang Street), N160 (Blumentritt Road) and Santa Mesa Heights in Quezon City.
		N162 (Dimasalang Street), Laon Laan Street	Traffic light intersection. Southwestward goes to Quiapo; Plaza Lawton & Manila City Hall; northeastward goes to Santa Mesa Heights; northbound goes to Balintawak & La Loma districts.
		Dapitan Street	Traffic light intersection. One-way road towards University of Santo Tomas.
		Piy Margal Street	Northbound only.
		Leon Ma. Guerrero Drive	Southbound only. University of Santo Tomas Gate 14. Access to UST Hospital.
		P. Florentino Street	Northbound only. One-way road from Quezon City.
		N170 (España Boulevard)	Traffic light intersection. Access to Welcome Rotonda & NLEX Connector.
		Manuel Earnshaw Street	No access to opposite directions. Southbound segment provides access to N180 (Legarda Street) and San Miguel district.
		Sergio H. Loyola Street	Traffic light intersection. One-way road and no left allowed from southbound
		Jacobo Fajardo Street	Traffic light intersection. One-way road.
		F. Jhocson Street	Southbound only. Access to National University.
		Alcantara Street	Southbound only.
		General Geronimo Street	Northbound only.
		P. Guevarra Street	Southbound only.
		Gerardo Tuazon Street	Access to G. Tuazon northbound via u-turn slot under Nagtahan Flyover. Northbound segment goes to E. Rodriguez Sr. Avenue; southbound segment goes to J. Figueras & Legarda Streets.
		North end of Mabini Flyover	
		Loreto Street Extension	Northbound only.
		N180 (Ramon Magsaysay Boulevard/Legarda Street), N140 (Nagtahan Street), Jose P. Laurel Street	Traffic light intersection. Southern terminus. Access to Malacañang Palace & San Miguel district via J.P. Laurel Street; Santa Mesa & Cubao districts via Magsaysay Boulevard; Quiapo & University Belt via Legarda Street, and Paco & Pandacan districts via Nagtahan Street.
1.000 mi = 1.609 km; 1.000 km = 0.621 mi: Incomplete access; Route transition
