= Pandacan station =

Railway station in Manila, Philippines

Pandacan
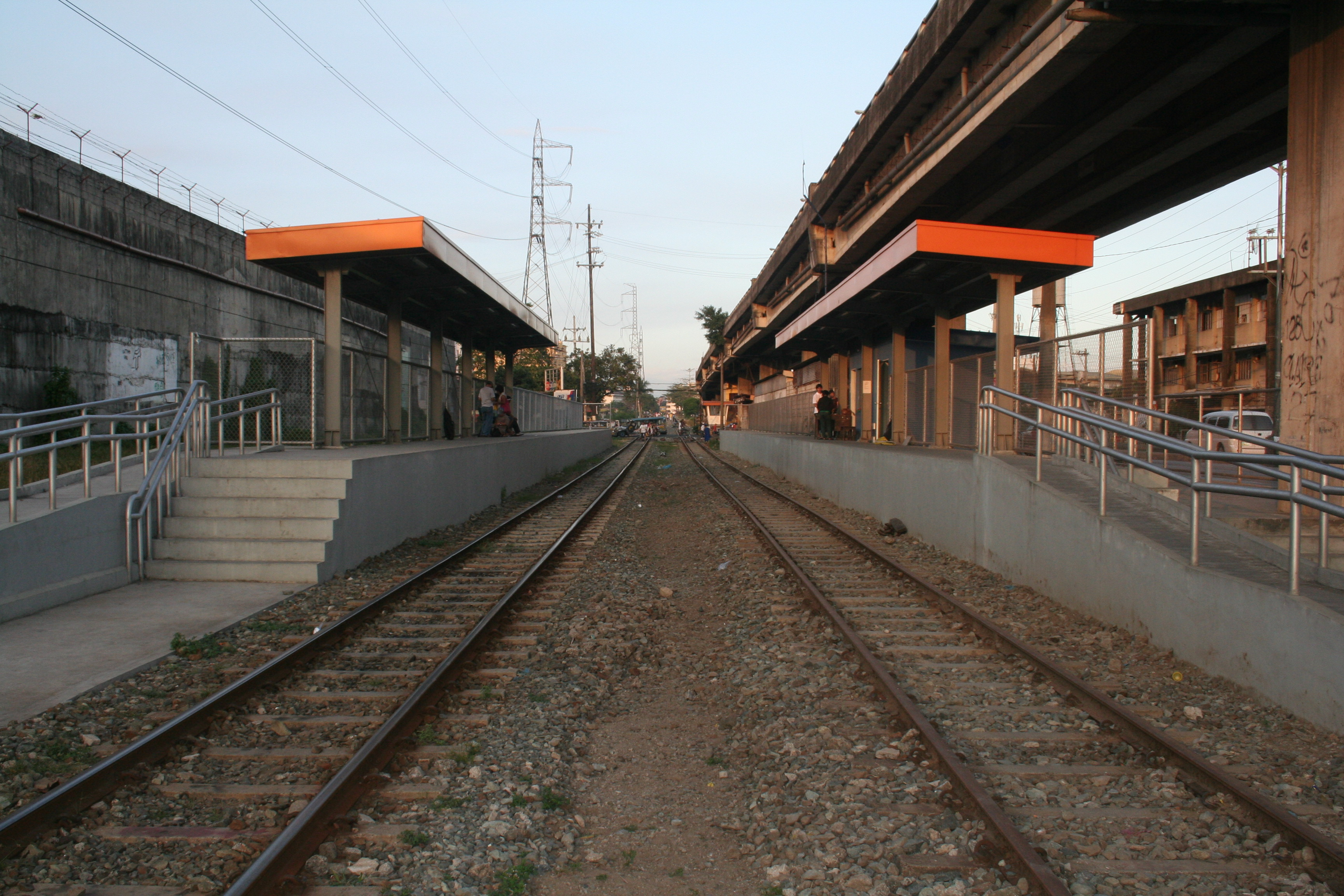
- Trackbed and platform area of Pandacan station

General information
- Location: Tomas Claudio Street, Pandacan
- Coordinates: 14°35′24.72″N 121°0′30.72″E
- Owner: Philippine National Railways
- Operator: Philippine National Railways
- Lines: South Main Line; Planned: North–South Commuter
- Platforms: Side platforms
- Tracks: 2
- Connections: Jeepneys, PanTSCI buses, tricycles

Construction
- Structure type: At grade
- Accessible: yes

Other information
- Station code: PD

History
- Opened: March 25, 1908
- Closed: March 28, 2024
- Rebuilt: 2009

Services
| Preceding station | PNR | Following station |
|---|---|---|
| Santa Mesa towards Tutuban | Metro South Commuter | Paco towards IRRI |
Location
- Location within Manila Location within Metro Manila Location within Luzon Location within Philippines

Pandacan station, also called Beata station, is a railway station located on the South Main Line in the city of Manila, Philippines.

This is the fifth station southbound from Tutuban.

== History ==
Pandacan was opened on March 25, 1908, as a station originally situated on the Manila Belt Line (from Tutuban to Paco), originally operated by Manila Railroad Company. Two now-defunct spur lines to nearby oil companies in Pandacan branched out from the station.

The station was closed on March 28, 2024, as part of the Tutuban–Alabang segment, to make way for the construction of the North–South Commuter Railway.

== Nearby landmarks ==
Near the station are landmarks such as the San Miguel Yamamura Packaging Corporation - Manila Plastics Plant, Jacinto Ciria Cruz Recreation Complex, and the residential communities of Pandacan. Located further away from the station are the Jacinto Zamora Elementary School, the Pandacan Linear Park, and the former Pandacan oil depot.

== Transportation links ==
Pandacan station is accessible by jeepneys plying routes on Tomas Claudio Street and Beata Street, and Pandacan Transport Services Cooperative Inc. (PanTSCI) buses also plying Beata Street route to or from Carriedo Street in Santa Cruz, Manila. Tricycles also drop passengers off at the station.
