= San Miguel Church (Manila) =

Roman Catholic church in Manila, Philippines

- National Shrine of Saint Michael and the Archangels
- Pambansang Dambana ni San Miguel at mga Arkanghel (Filipino); Santuario Nacional de San Miguel y los Arcángeles (Spanish)
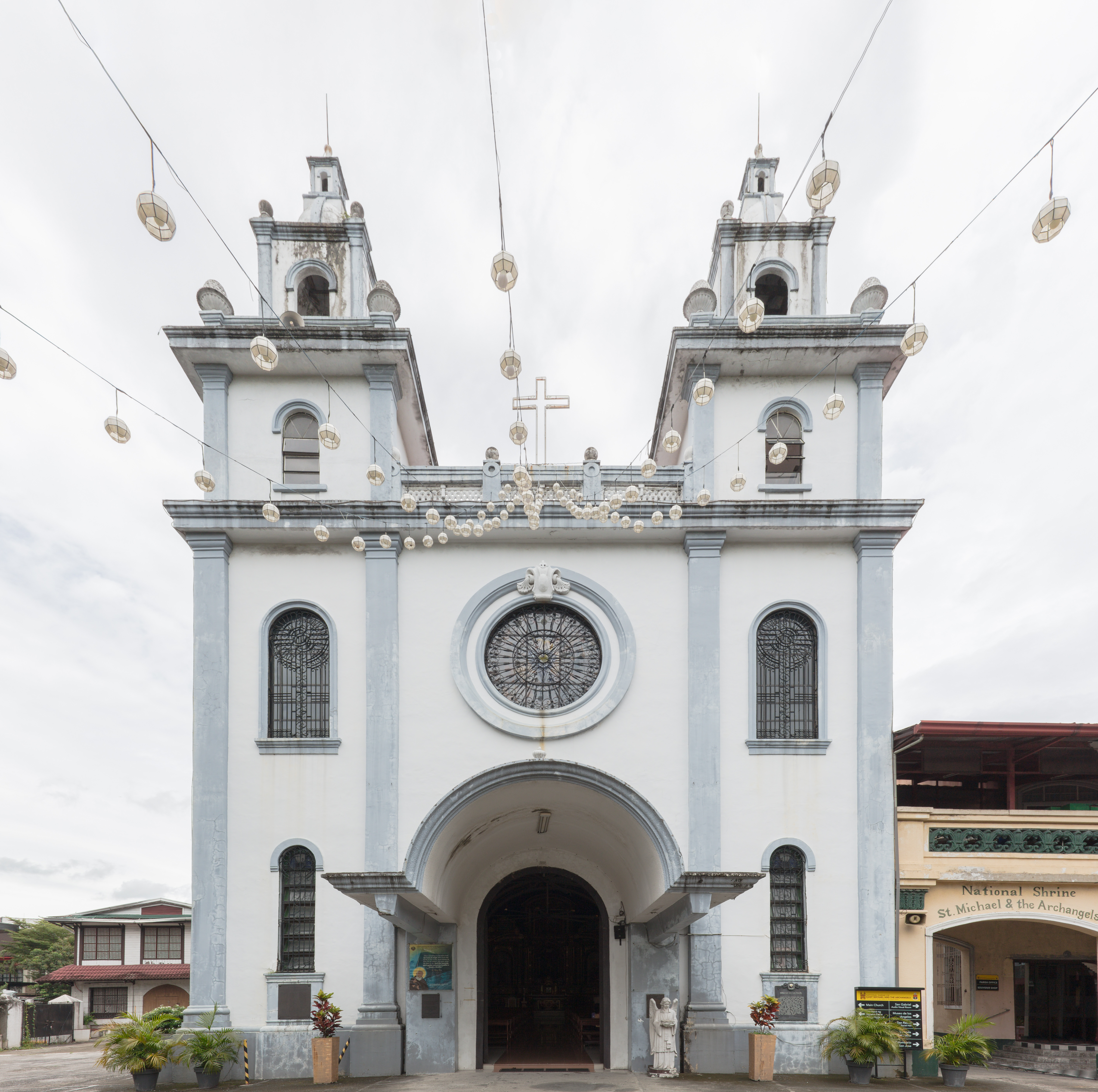
- Main façade of the church in 2023
- San Miguel Church
- 14°35′31″N 120°59′30″E
- Location: J.P. Laurel cor. Gen. Solano Streets, San Miguel, Manila
- Country: Philippines
- Denomination: Catholic

History
- Status: National Shrine
- Founded: 1603
- Dedication: Saint Michael, Saint Gabriel, and Saint Raphael

Architecture
- Functional status: Active
- Architectural type: Church building
- Style: European Baroque
- Completed: 1913

Administration
- Archdiocese: Manila
- Deanery: José de Trozo
- Parish: Saint Michael and the Archangels

Clergy
- Rector: Rev. Msgr. Mario D. Enriquez

The National Shrine of Saint Michael and the Archangels, commonly known as San Miguel Church, is a Latin Rite Catholic church located on the corner of Jose Laurel Street and General Solano Street in the San Miguel district of Manila, Philippines. It is under the jurisdiction of the Archdiocese of Manila, and is dedicated to the archangels Saint Michael, Saint Gabriel, and Saint Raphael.

Situated on the former site of La Fábrica de Cerveza de San Miguel (now San Miguel Brewery), the shrine is also known as Malacañang Church as it is within the Malacañang Palace complex, the official residence of the President of the Republic of the Philippines. Presidents who have worshipped at the shrine include Carlos P. García, Gloria Macapagal Arroyo, and Fidel V. Ramos (who was Protestant).

San Miguel Church has around 1,500 regular parishioners, some of whom descend from old, rich families in the district. It is also notably the only Catholic church in the country where priests (instead of bishops) have the canonical dispensation to administer the Sacrament of Confirmation twice a week.

== History ==
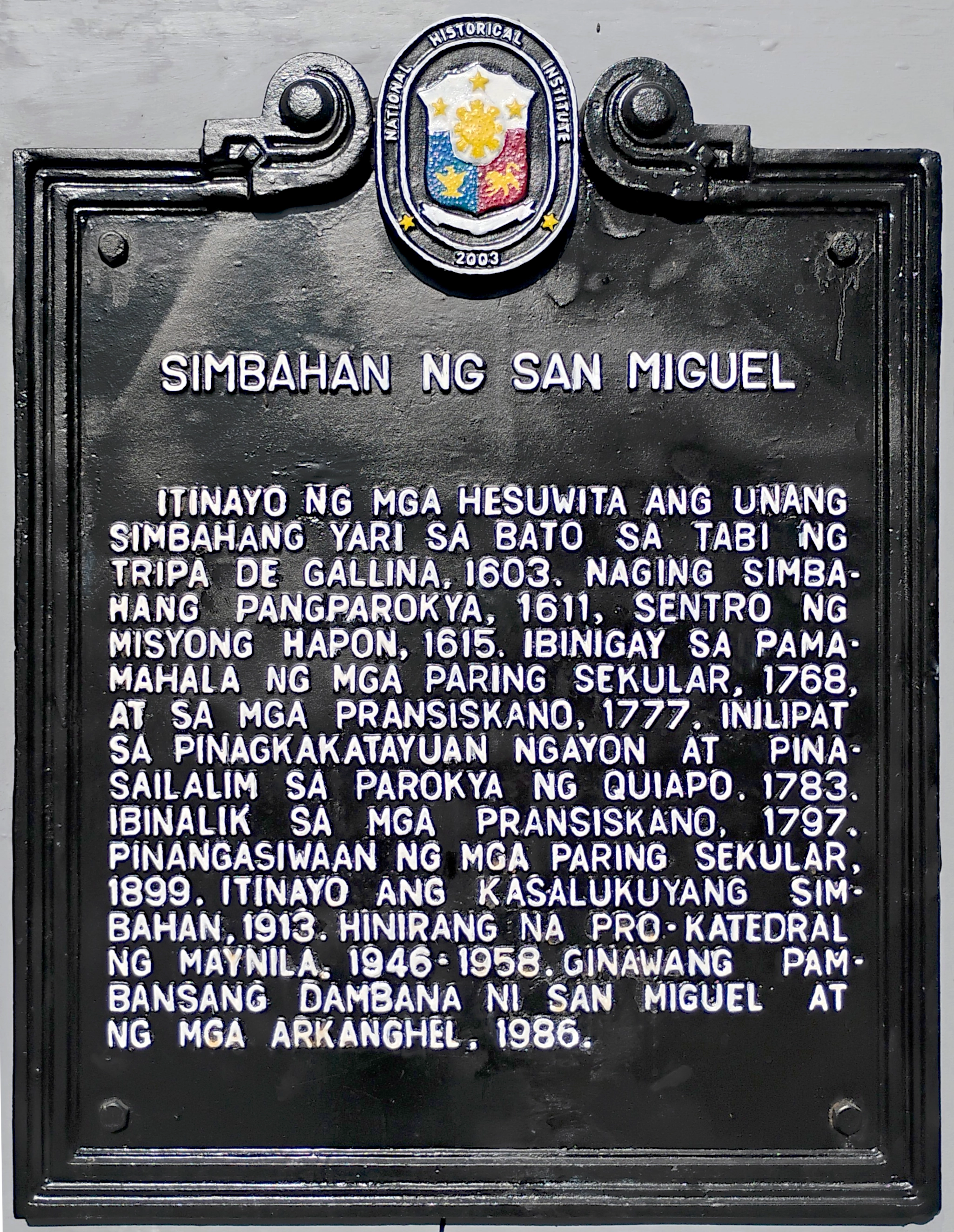
NHI historical marker installed in 2003

San Miguel Church was first built in stone in 1603 by the Jesuits in Paco, Manila (formerly Dilao). In the 17th and early 18th centuries, the number of Japanese expatriates in that area grew, and they established a community. In 1611, the Jesuits and Filipino Catholics accommodated Japanese Christian refugees fleeing persecution by the Tokugawa Shogunate.

The church was damaged in the 1645 Luzon earthquake, and during the British occupation of Manila that was part of the Seven Years' War. It was rebuilt in 1913 on its present site through the generous assistance of Doña Margarita Róxas de Ayala.

The church served as pro-cathedral of the Archdiocese of Manila as Manila Cathedral was being rebuilt from 1946 to 1958, following the city's destruction in World War II. It was elevated to the rank of national shrine in 1986. The church generally follows European Baroque architecture and features twin bell towers. Above the porte-cochère of the west face is a small, cement statue of Our Lady of Mount Carmel enthroned upon clouds. Both the nave and the sanctuary (including the apse) are presently decorated with starry ceilings.

== Notable events ==
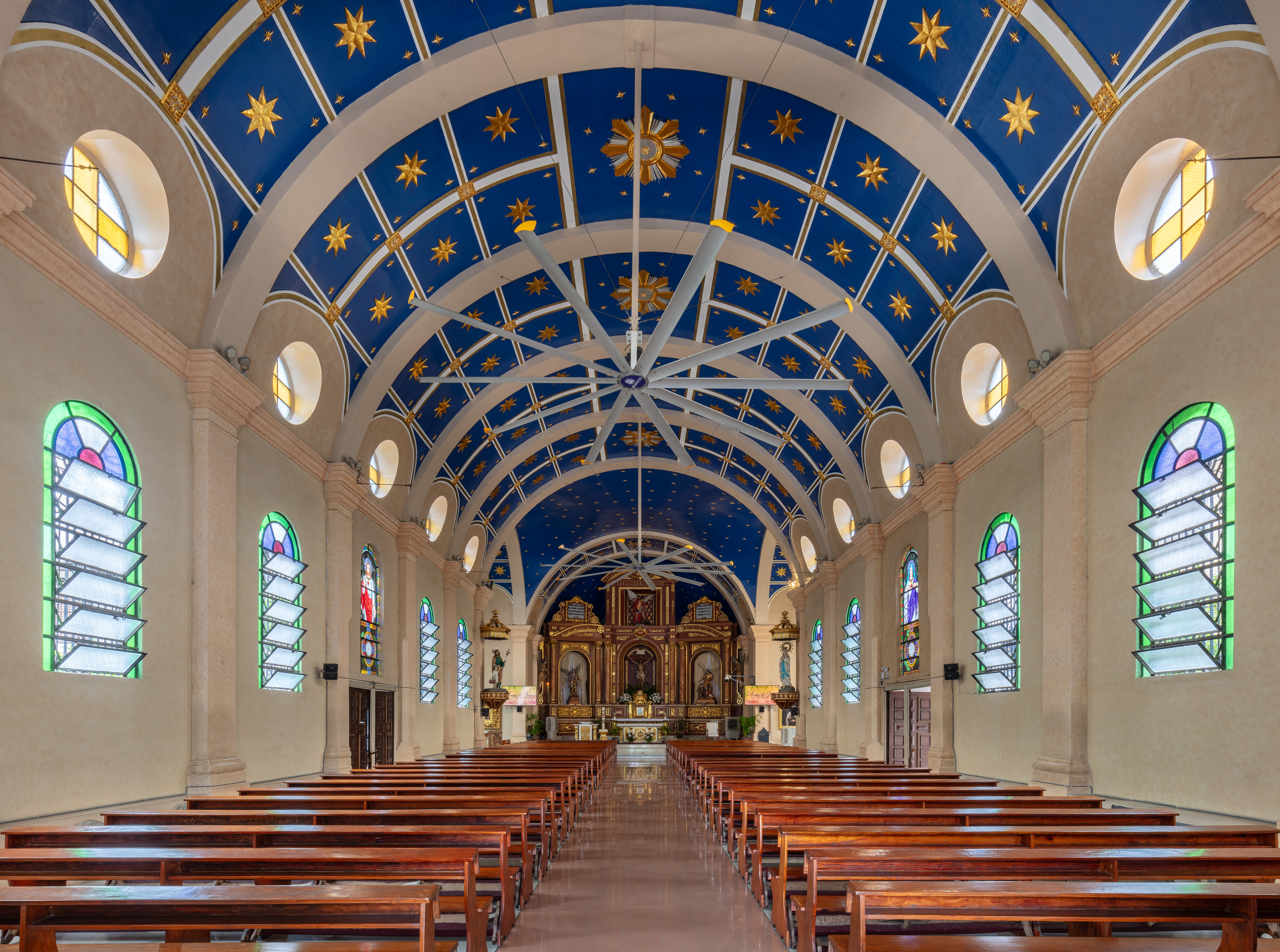
Church interior in 2023

On May 1, 1954, Ilocos Norte representative and later President Ferdinand E. Marcos married beauty queen Imelda Romuáldez in the shrine (at the time still Manila’s pro-cathedral). Their wedding, which followed almost two weeks of courtship, was tagged as the Wedding of the Year, with President Ramon Magsaysay as principal sponsor. Imelda's parents, Vicente Orestes Romuáldez and Remedios Trinidad, were also wedded in the church (at dawn, upon the insistence of the groom's mother Josefa) in 1928, while her father's first wife Juanita Acereda (d. 1926) is also interred in the church.

Archbishop Gabriel M. Reyes, the archdiocese's first native Filipino ordinary who reigned from 1949 to 1952, was initially buried in the shrine before his remains were transferred to the crypt of Manila Cathedral. Also buried in the church are Don Domingo Róxas, patriarch of the Zóbel-de Ayala-Róxas-Soriano clans.

== Gallery ==
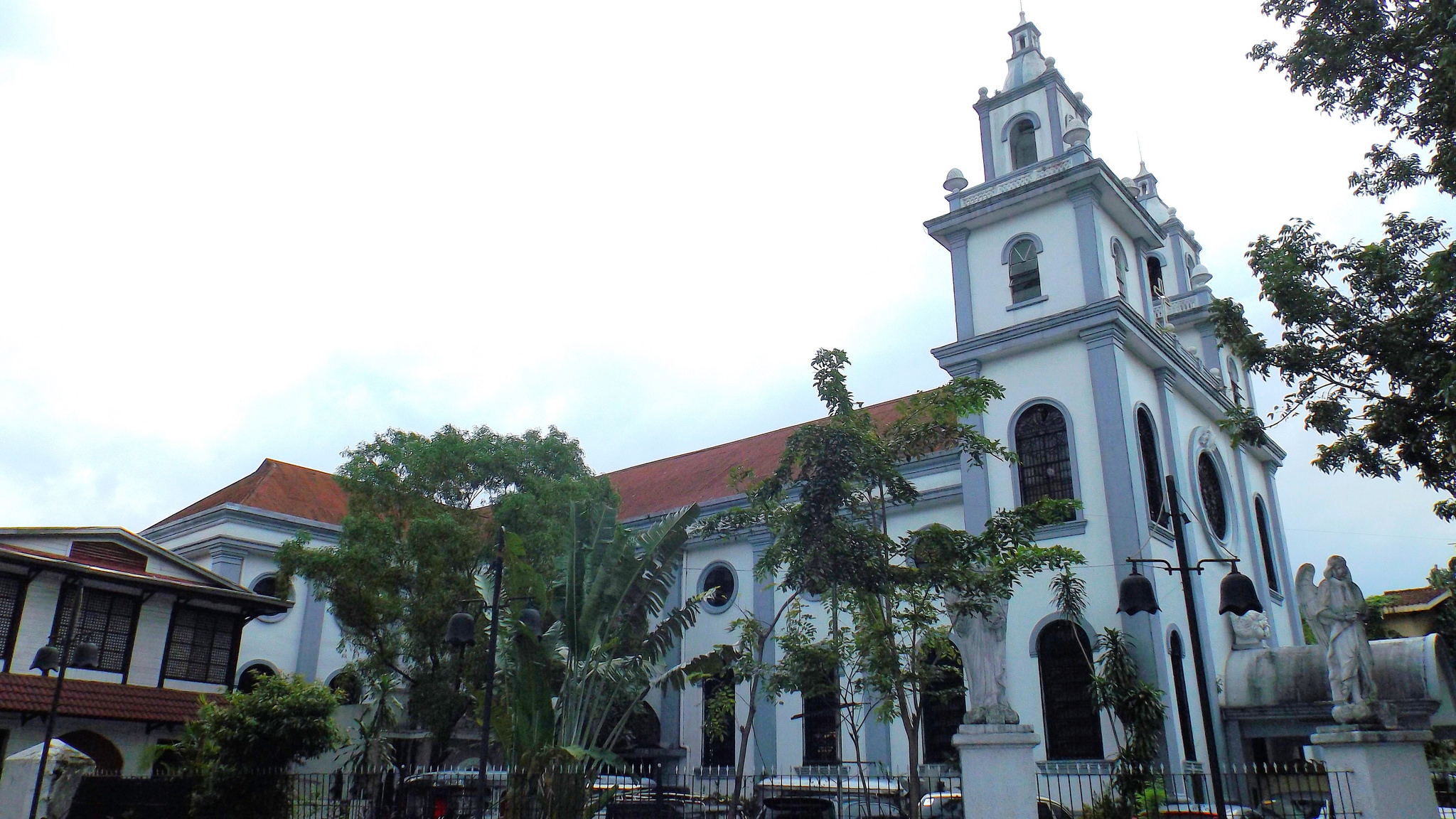
North flank of the church, with its west façade and twin belfries to the right

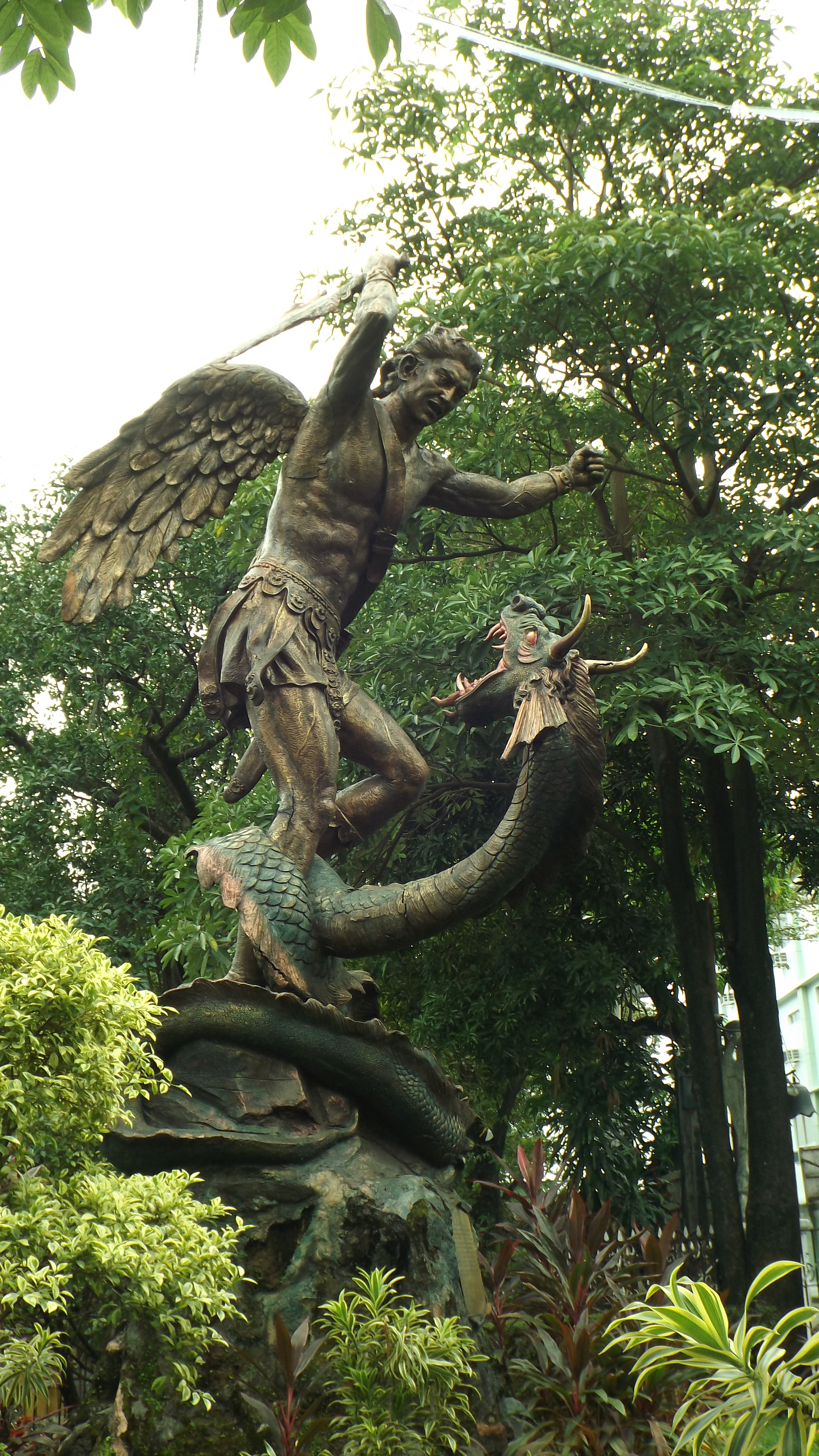
Statue of Saint Michael fighting the Devil, depicted as a dragon, in the parvise of the church

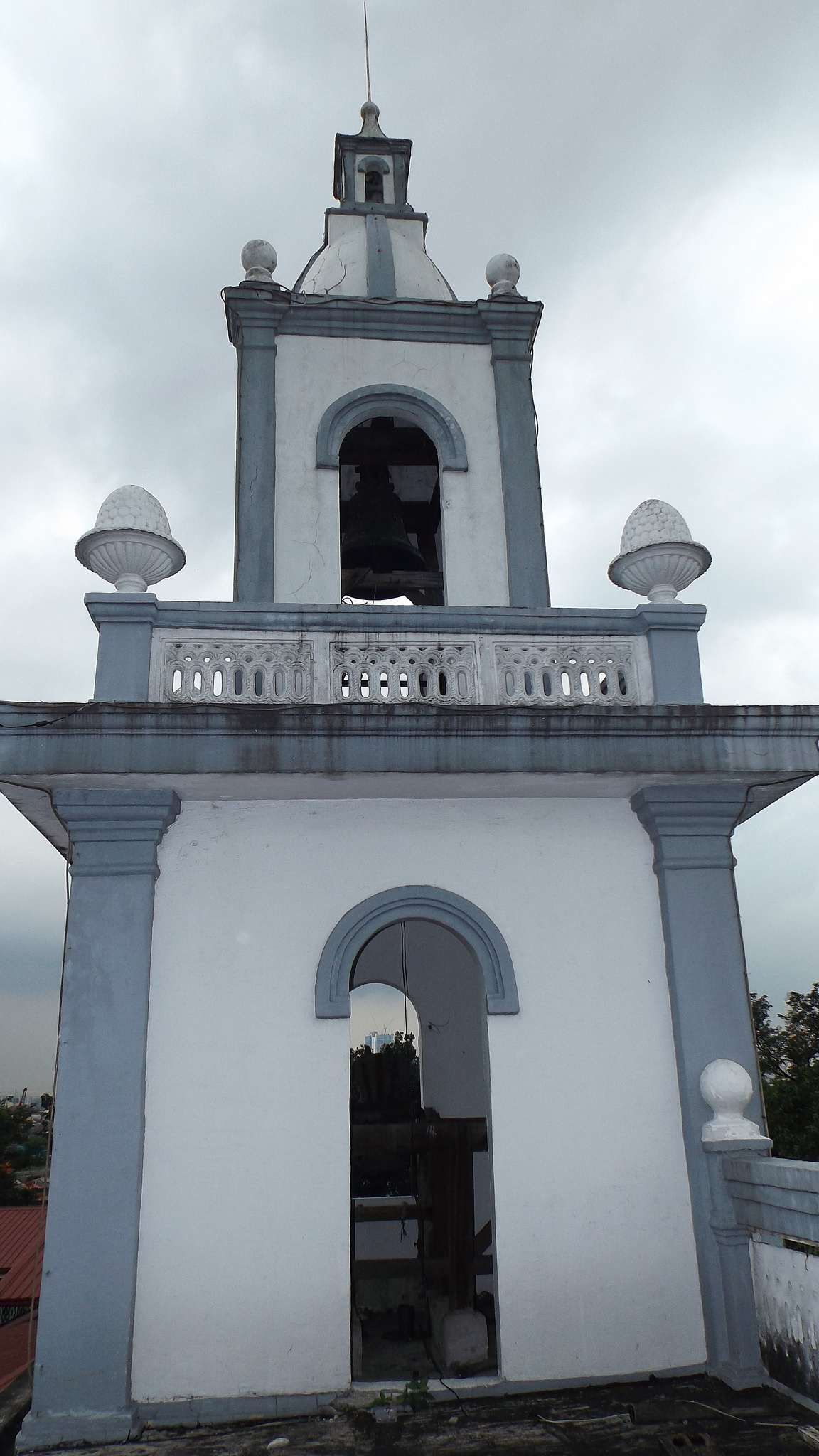
The south belfry in 2014, from the upper gallery of the façade

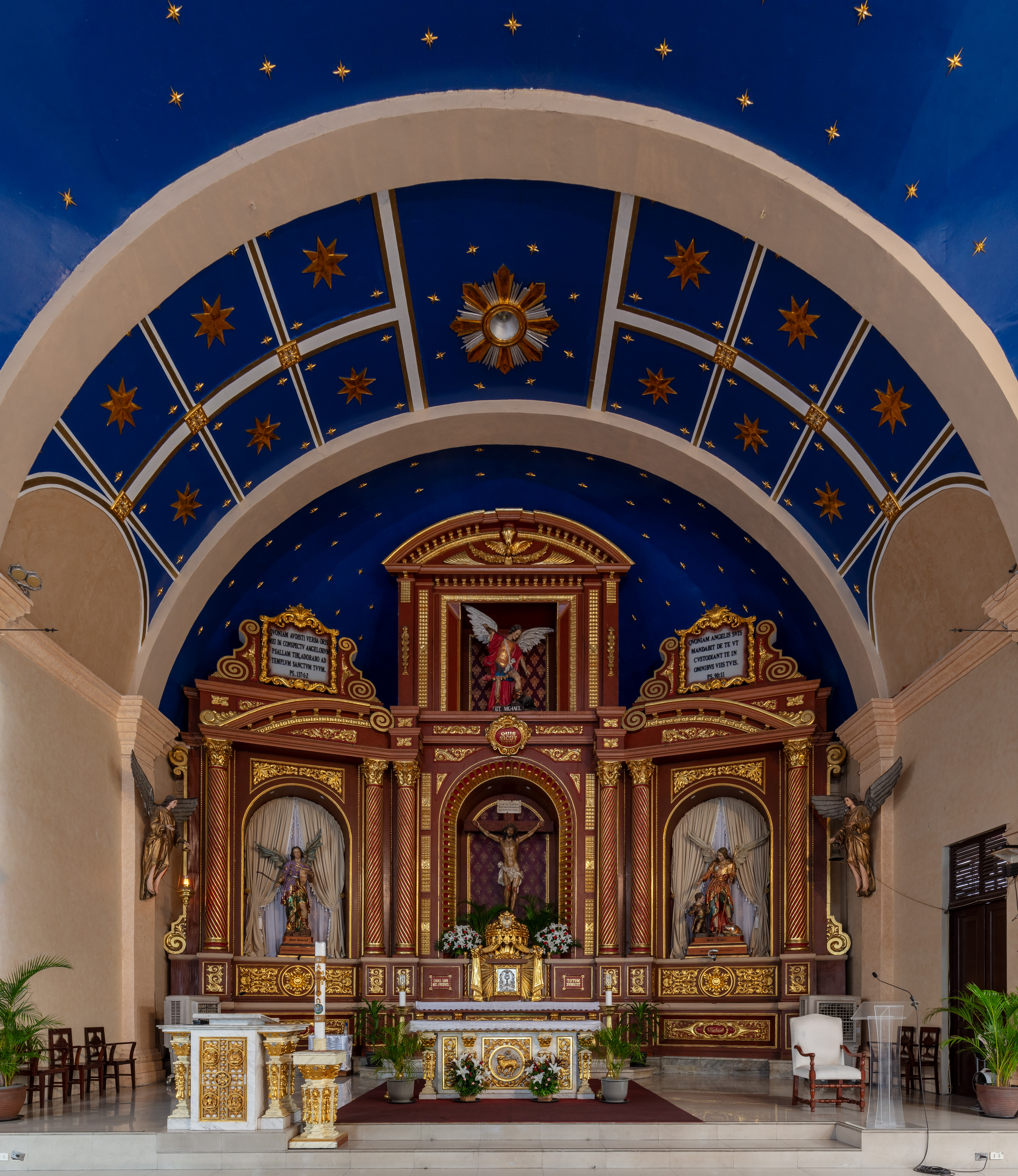
The renovated main retablo in the east end, 2023

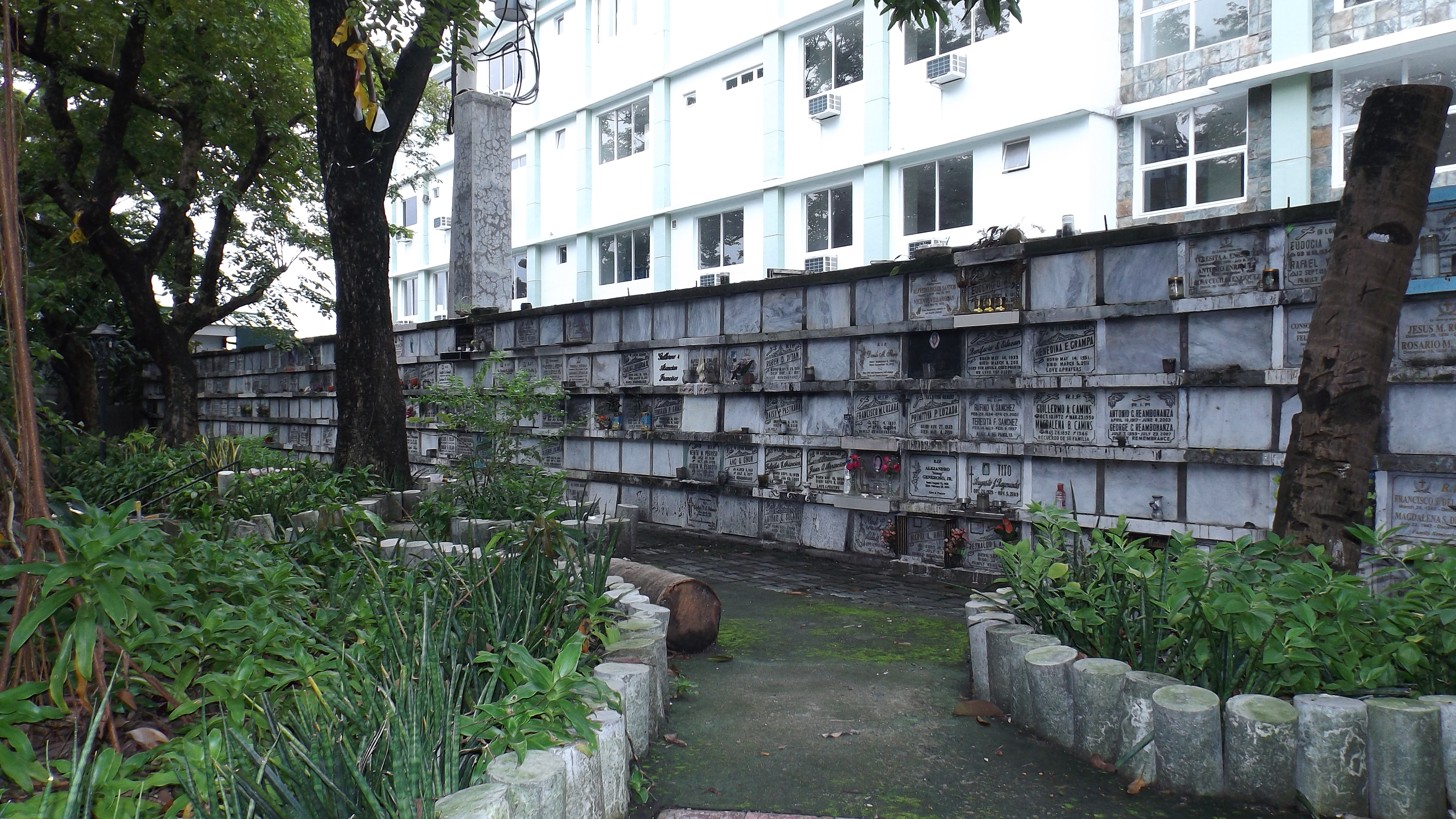
Churchyard cemetery
