= Nagtahan Link Bridge =

Series of road bridges in Manila, Philippines

- Carries: 2-4 lanes of N141 (Paco-Santa Mesa Road), vehicular traffic and pedestrians
- Crosses: Pasig River
- Locale: Manila, Philippines
- Maintained by: Department of Public Works and Highways - South Manila District Engineering Office
- Preceded by: Mabini Bridge
- Followed by: Metro Manila Skyway

Characteristics
- Material: Concrete
- Total length: 2,160 m (7,090 ft)
- Width: 7.1 to 15.7 m (23 to 52 ft)
- Height: Maximum 1.8 to 9 m (5.9 to 29.5 ft)
- No. of spans: 42
- Load limit: 15 t (15,000 kg)
- No. of lanes: 2 to 4 (1 to 2 per direction)
- Design life: 4 to 13 years

History
- Construction end: 1998 (all bridges)

The Nagtahan Link Bridge is a series of road bridges crossing the Pasig River between the districts of Paco and Santa Mesa in Manila, Philippines. Constructed from 1996 to 1998, the road links and bridges pass along Paco-Santa Mesa Road, also referred to as Tomas Claudio Street.

== Link Bridge 1 ==
Nagtahan Link Bridge 1 is a 410-meter (0.25 mi) elevated one-way road flyover in Paco and Pandacan. It was constructed in 1998 and serves as the eastbound side of Tomas Claudio Street from Quirino Avenue. The flyover crosses over the Philippine National Railways and the streets of Beata, Menandro, Dr. M.L. Carreon, and Kahilum II before it descends near the San Miguel Yamamura packaging plant.

The eastbound section of the road is officially named Nagtahan Link Road 1. It becomes one-way eastbound again as it meets with the start of the one-way westbound Nagtahan Link Bridge 4. The combined four-lane road continues east as Nagtahan Link Bridge 3. After the construction of Metro Manila Skyway Stage 3, the road and flyover have since become two-way.

== Link Bridge 3 ==
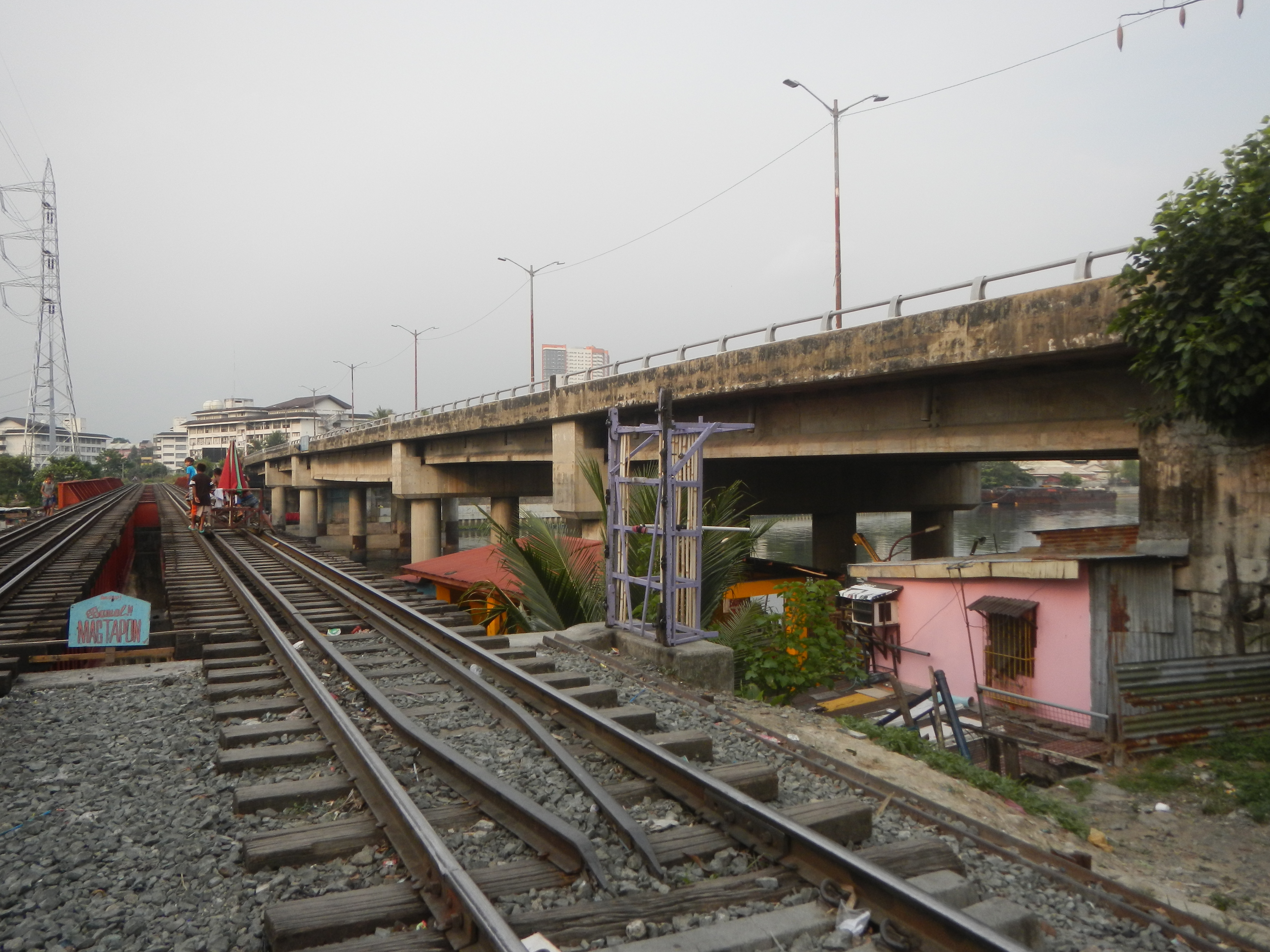
Nagtahan Link Bridge 3/Padre Jacinto Zamora Bridge (right) with the Pandacan Railway Bridge (left)

Nagtahan Link Bridge 3, also known as Santa Mesa Bridge, Padre Jacinto Zamora Bridge, and Pandacan Bridge, is a 148-meter (0.092 mi) two-way, four-lane (two lanes per direction) bridge that crosses the Pasig River and connects the districts of Pandacan and Santa Mesa. The road then terminates at an intersection with Valenzuela Street, which provides access to Victorino Mapa Street, Magsaysay Boulevard and P. Sanchez Road. It was constructed in 1998 and renamed in 2000 after Jacinto Zamora, a member of the martyred Gomburza priests born in Pandacan.

This bridge is parallel to the Pandacan Railway Bridge, a steel railway bridge used by the PNR Metro Commuter Line, and an aqueduct held by Maynilad.

== Link Bridge 4 ==
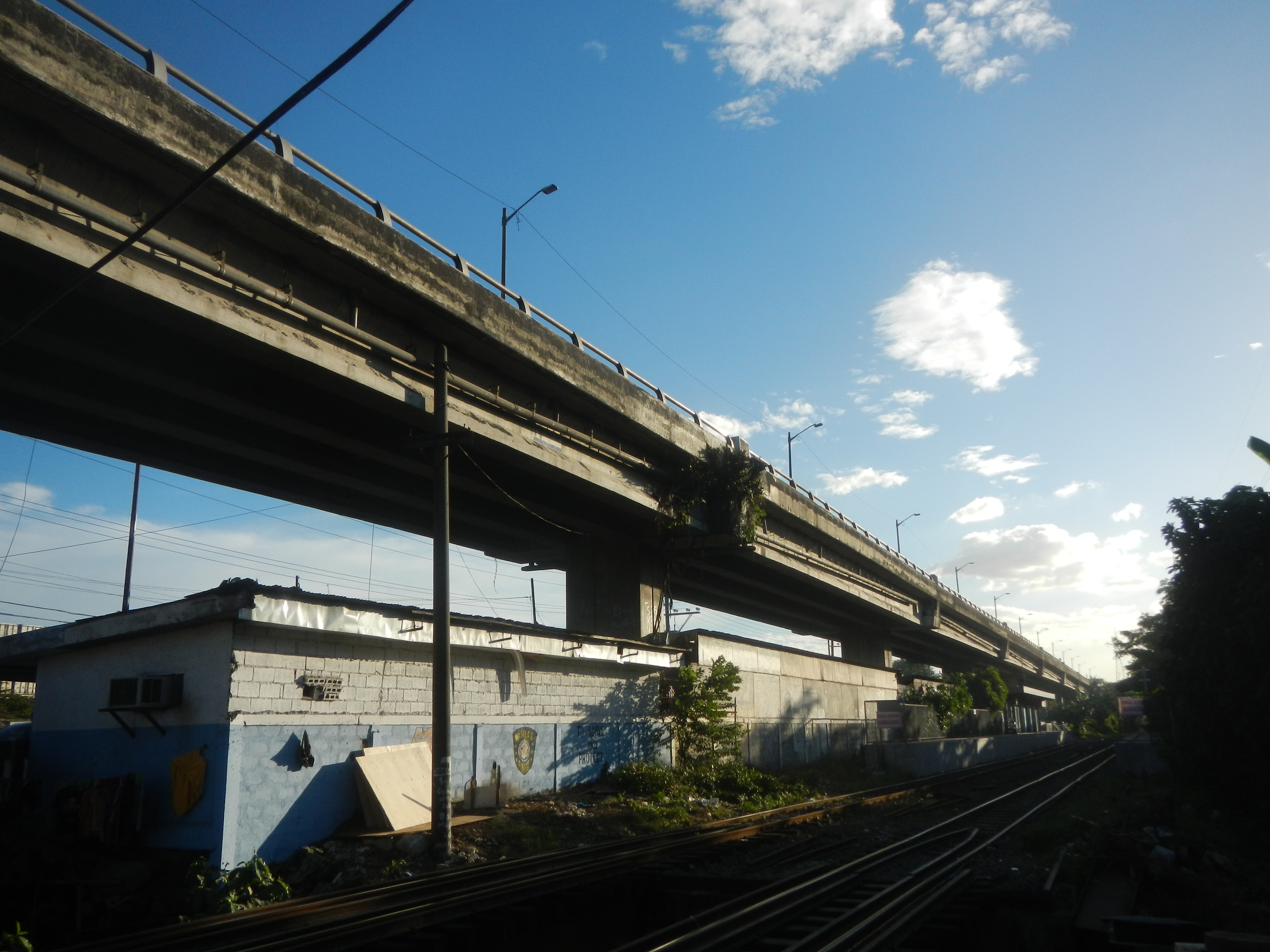
Nagtahan Link Bridge 4

Nagtahan Link Bridge 4, also known as Tomas Claudio Bridge, is a 663-meter (0.412 mi) elevated flyover located in Pandacan. The flyover was constructed in 1998 and serves as the westbound side of Tomas Claudio Street from the end of Padre Jacinto Zamora Bridge (Link Bridge 3) and crosses over the Beata Street and Pandacan station of the PNR Metro Commuter Line until it terminates at the intersection with Menandro, Laura, and Dr. M. L. Carreon Streets, where it continues westbound to Nagtahan Link Bridge 5.

The westbound section is officially named Nagtahan Link Road 2. From 2019 to 2020, the entire road and bridge were closed to make way for the construction of Skyway Stage 3.

== Link Bridge 5 ==
Nagtahan Link Bridge 5 is a short 12.2-meter (40 ft) road bridge carrying the westbound side of Tomas Claudio Street over the Estero de Pandacan (which becomes the Beata Creek) bordering the districts of Pandacan and Paco. Westbound access to Paco was temporarily closed during the construction of Skyway Stage 3.

== Intersections ==
The entire route is located in Manila.

Province	City/Municipality	km	mi	Destinations	Notes
Manila		8	5.0	N141 (Valenzuela Street)	Eastbound access only. One-way towards Paco-Santa Mesa Road.
Manila		8	5.0	Maui Oasis Access Road	Westbound access only.
Manila				Santa Mesa Bridge	
Manila				West end of the one-way westbound Tomas Claudio Bridge.	
Manila				Beata Street	Eastbound access only.
Manila		7	4.3	Nagtahan Link Bridge 4 (westbound), Beata Bridge (eastbound)	
Manila		7	4.3	East end of the one-way eastbound Nagtahan Link Bridge 1.	
Manila				West end of the one-way westbound Tomas Claudio Bridge.	
Manila				Menandro Street / Dr. M. L. Carreon Street	Westbound access only.
Manila				Nagtahan Link Bridge 5 (westbound), Nagtahan Link Bridge 1 (eastbound)	
Manila				Kahilum II Street	Westbound access only.
Manila				Labores Street	Westbound access only.
Manila				West end of the one-way eastbound Nagtahan Link Bridge 1.	
Manila		6	3.7	N140 (Quirino Avenue)	Western terminus.
1.000 mi = 1.609 km; 1.000 km = 0.621 mi: Closed/former; Incomplete access
