= Circumferential Road 2 =

Road in Manila, Philippines

C-2 Circumferential Road 2
- C-2 Road; National Route 140
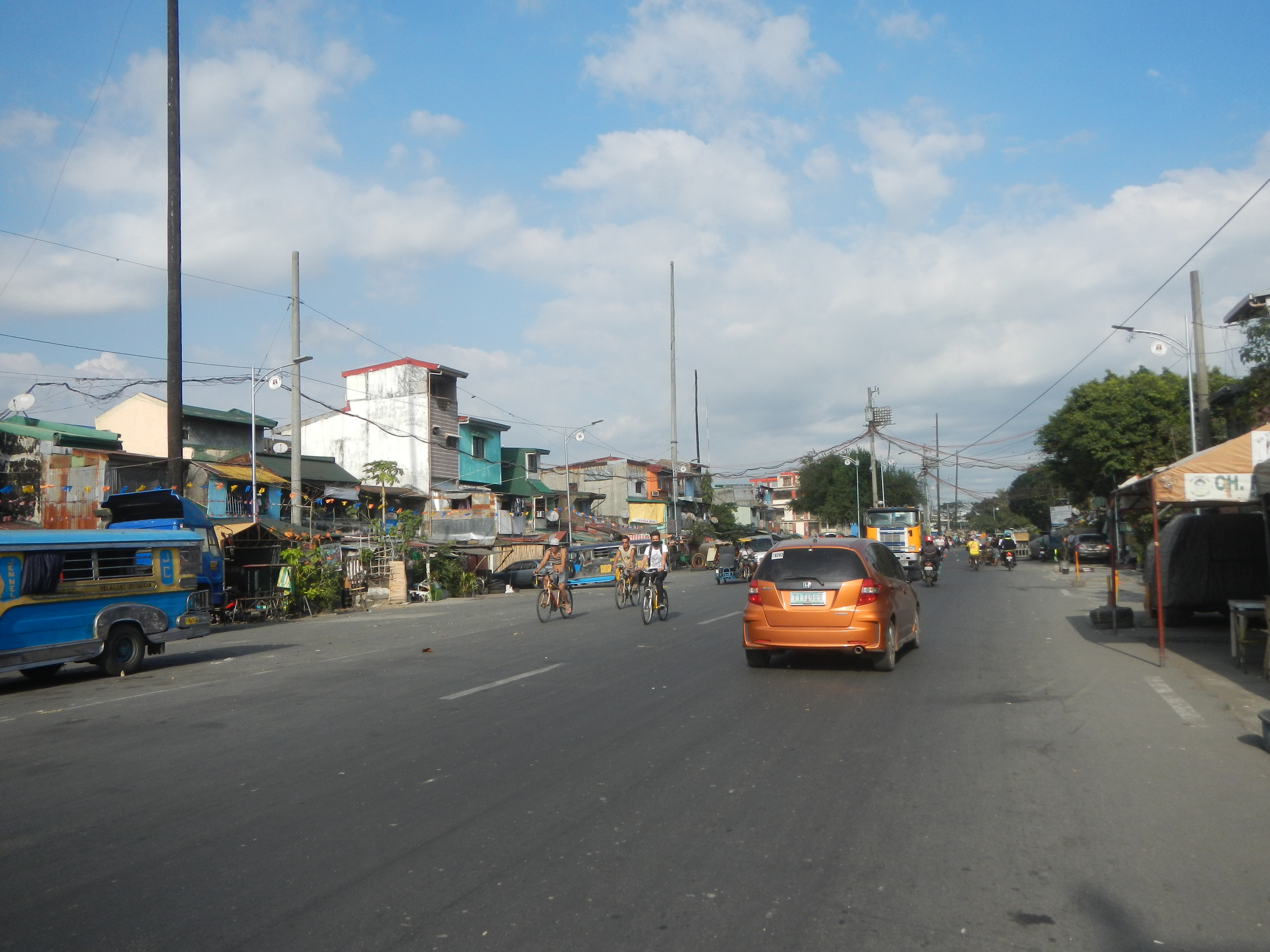
- Capulong Street, a segment of C-2, uniquely designated on street signs as C-2 Road

Route information
- Maintained by the Department of Public Works and Highways
- Length: 10.18 km (6.33 mi)

Major junctions
- North end: AH 26 (N120) (Mel Lopez Boulevard) in Tondo
- N151 (Abad Santos Avenue); N150 (Rizal Avenue); N162 (Dimasalang Street); N170 (España Boulevard); N180 (Legarda Street / Magsaysay Boulevard); N141 (Tomas Claudio Street); N156 (Plaza Dilao Road); N145 (Osmeña Highway); N181 (San Marcelino Street); N170 (Taft Avenue)
- South end: AH 26 (N120) (Roxas Boulevard) in Malate

Location
- Country: Philippines
- Major cities: Manila

Highway system
- Roads in the Philippines; Highways; Expressways; List
| ← N130 | → N141 |

Circumferential Road 2 (C-2), informally known as the C-2 Road, is a network of roads and bridges which comprise the second beltway of Metro Manila in the Philippines. Spanning some 10.18 kilometers (6.33 mi), it connects the districts of Tondo, Santa Cruz, Sampaloc, San Miguel, Santa Mesa, Paco, Pandacan, and Malate in Manila.

The entire route is designated National Route 140 (N140) of the Philippine highway network.

== History ==
The development of a major road network in Manila was first conceived in the Metropolitan Thoroughfare Plan of 1945, predicting that the metropolis would expand further to the shorelines of Laguna de Bay. The plan proposed the laying of circumferential roads 1 to 6 and radial roads 1 to 10.

The concept was to connect already existing short road segments to form C-2. To be joined are Calle Kapulong (Capulong), Calle Tayuman, Calle Governor Forbes, Calle Nagtahan found north of the Pasig River, and Calle Canonigo on the south bank of the Pasig. The Nagtahan Bridge, the widest bridge crossing the Pasig River until it was surpassed by the Guadalupe Bridge in 1963, connected these two sections.

Older roads date back to the early 19th century under Spanish rule. Calle Canonigo (now Quirino Avenue Extension) was laid out to connect Plaza Dilao and Paco railroad station to Calle Isaac Peral (now United Nations Avenue). The road perpendicular to Canonigo leading to the Pasig River was a narrow street called Calle Luengo in Pandacan.

A 1915 map of Manila shows that Calle Kapulong was a proposed short street accessible via Calle Velasquez. A 1934 map of Manila by the YMCA shows Calle Tayuman starting at Calle Sande (now Nicolas Zamora Street) and Calle Juan Luna and ending near the San Lazaro Hippodrome. The road then connects to Calle Governor Forbes (now Lacson Avenue), which stretches until Calle Lealtad (now Fajardo). Calle Nagtahan connects the Santa Mesa Rotonda to the Pasig River. South of the river, only Calle Canonigo was existing. Harrison Boulevard (now Quirino Avenue) was then built during the Commonwealth period to connect Calle Herrán (now Pedro Gil Street) to Dewey Boulevard (now Roxas Boulevard). Eventually, Calle Luengo was extended to Calle Herran.

== Route description ==
=== Capulong Street ===
Uniquely identified on street signs explicitly as C-2 Road, Capulong Street starts from Mel Lopez Boulevard, a part of Radial Road 10 (R-10), crosses and curves along the Estero de Vitas, and ends at Juan Luna Street. It is the main thoroughfare of the district of Tondo in Manila.

=== Tayuman Street ===
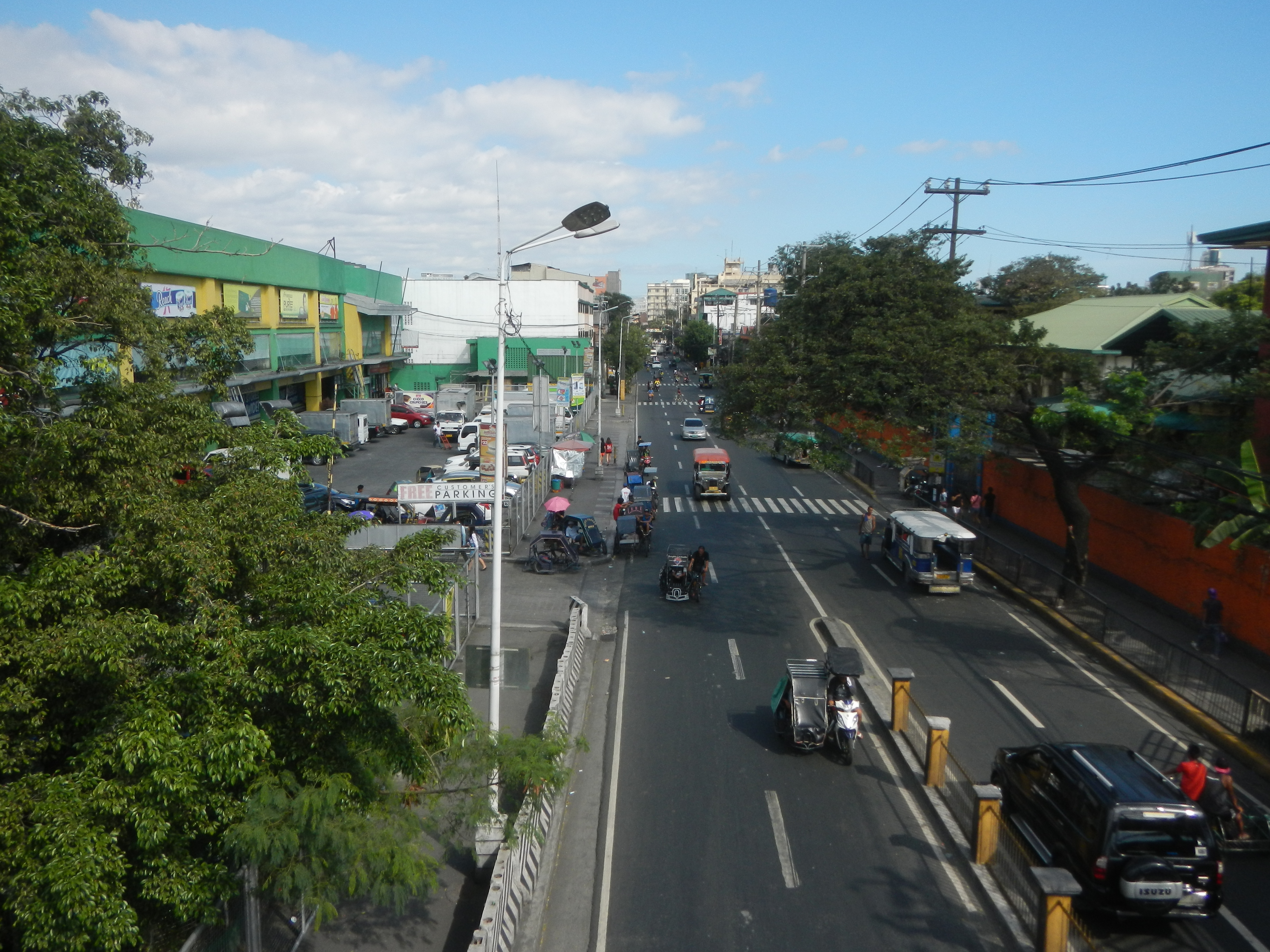
Tayuman Street

Tayuman Street is a four-lane west-east thoroughfare of the districts of Tondo and Santa Cruz. It starts from Juan Luna Street and ends at a junction with Lacson Avenue. The entire road is considered a part of the C-2 Road.

=== Lacson Avenue ===
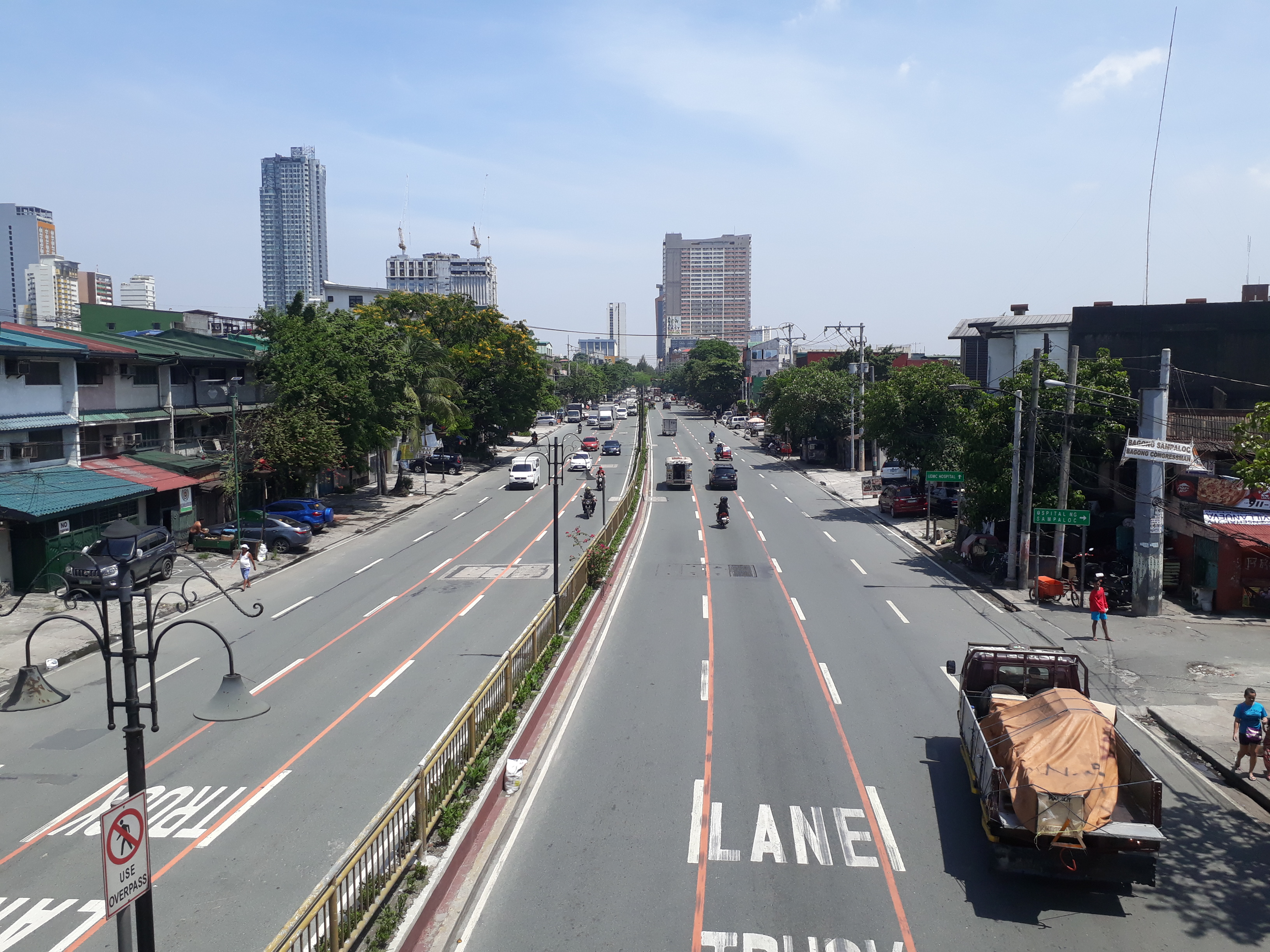
Lacson Avenue

Travelling southeastward, the C-2 segment of Lacson Avenue (formerly Governor Forbes Avenue) starts at the junction with Tayuman and Consuelo Streets in Santa Cruz and ends at Nagtahan Interchange, skirting the old San Lazaro Hippodrome.

=== Nagtahan Street ===
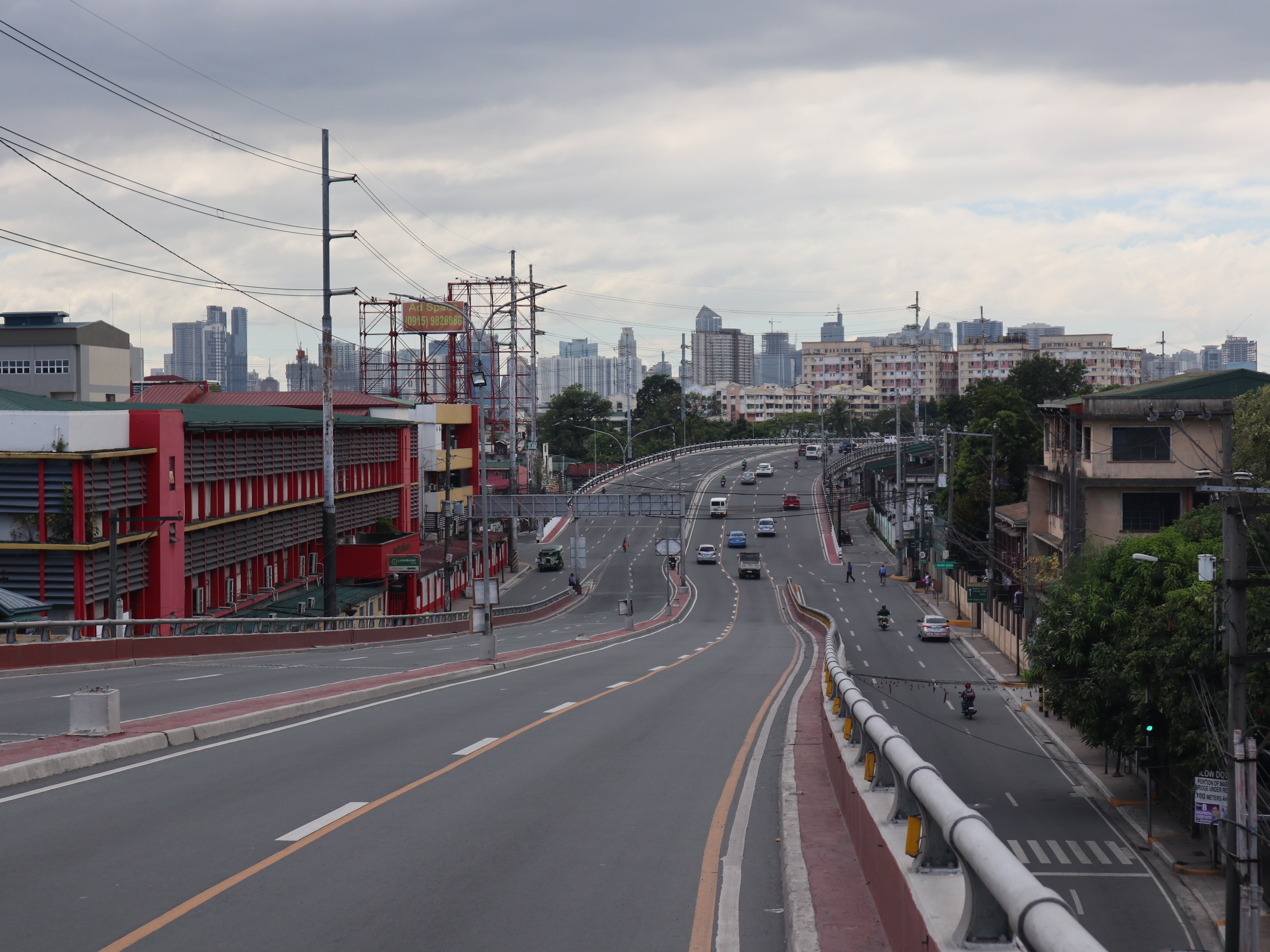
Nagtahan Street south of the Nagtahan Interchange

Nagtahan Street connects the Nagtahan Interchange with Mabini Bridge (Nagtahan Bridge), which crosses the Pasig River.

=== Quirino Avenue ===
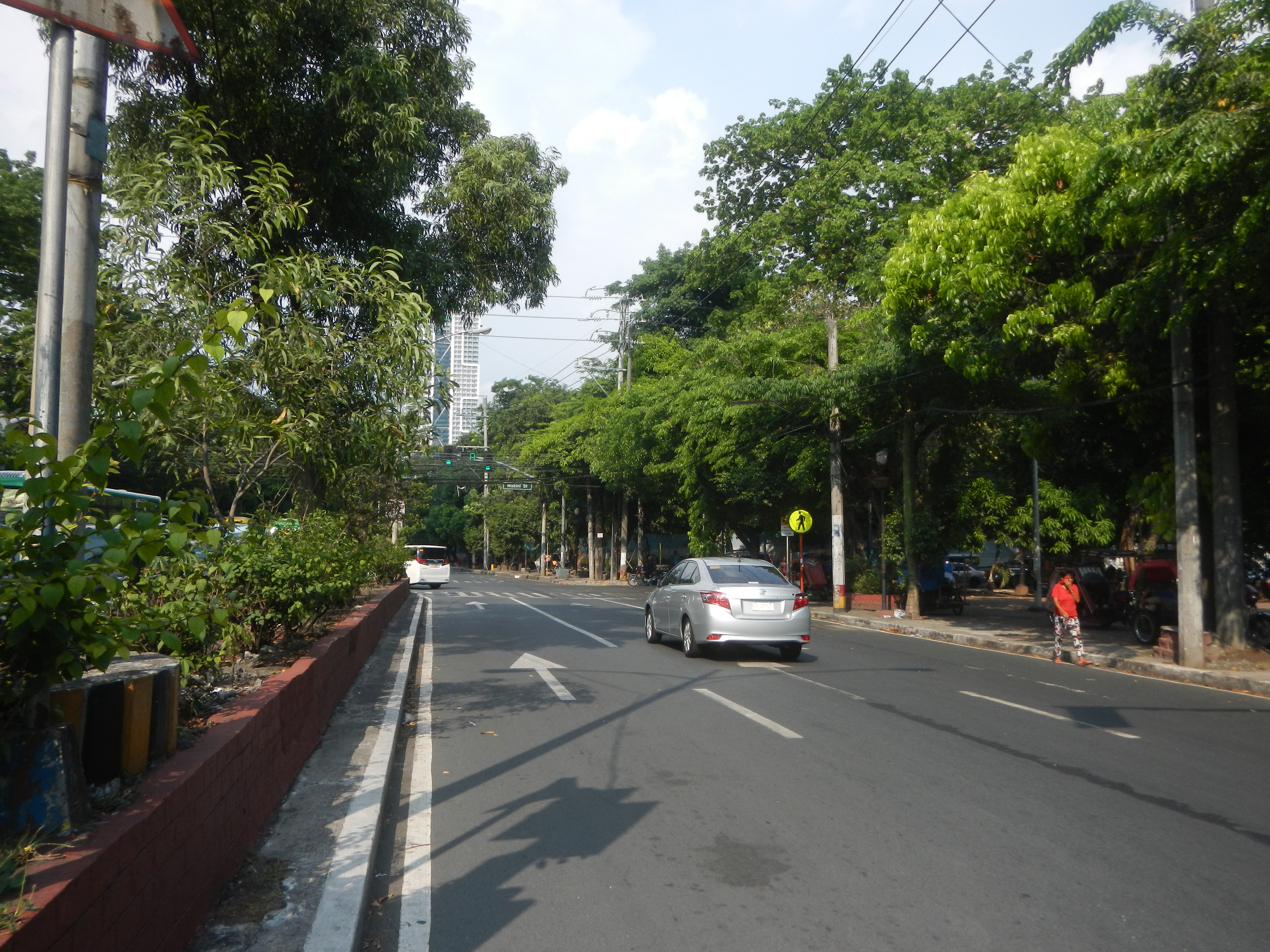
Quirino Avenue

Quirino Avenue starts at the southern end of Mabini Bridge at the junction of Paz Mendoza Guazon (formerly Otis) and Jesus Streets in Paco, veers southwest at Plaza Azul in Pandacan, and ends at Roxas Boulevard, a part of Radial Road 1 (R-1), in Malate.
