= Mabini Bridge =

Mabini Bridge Tulay Mabini
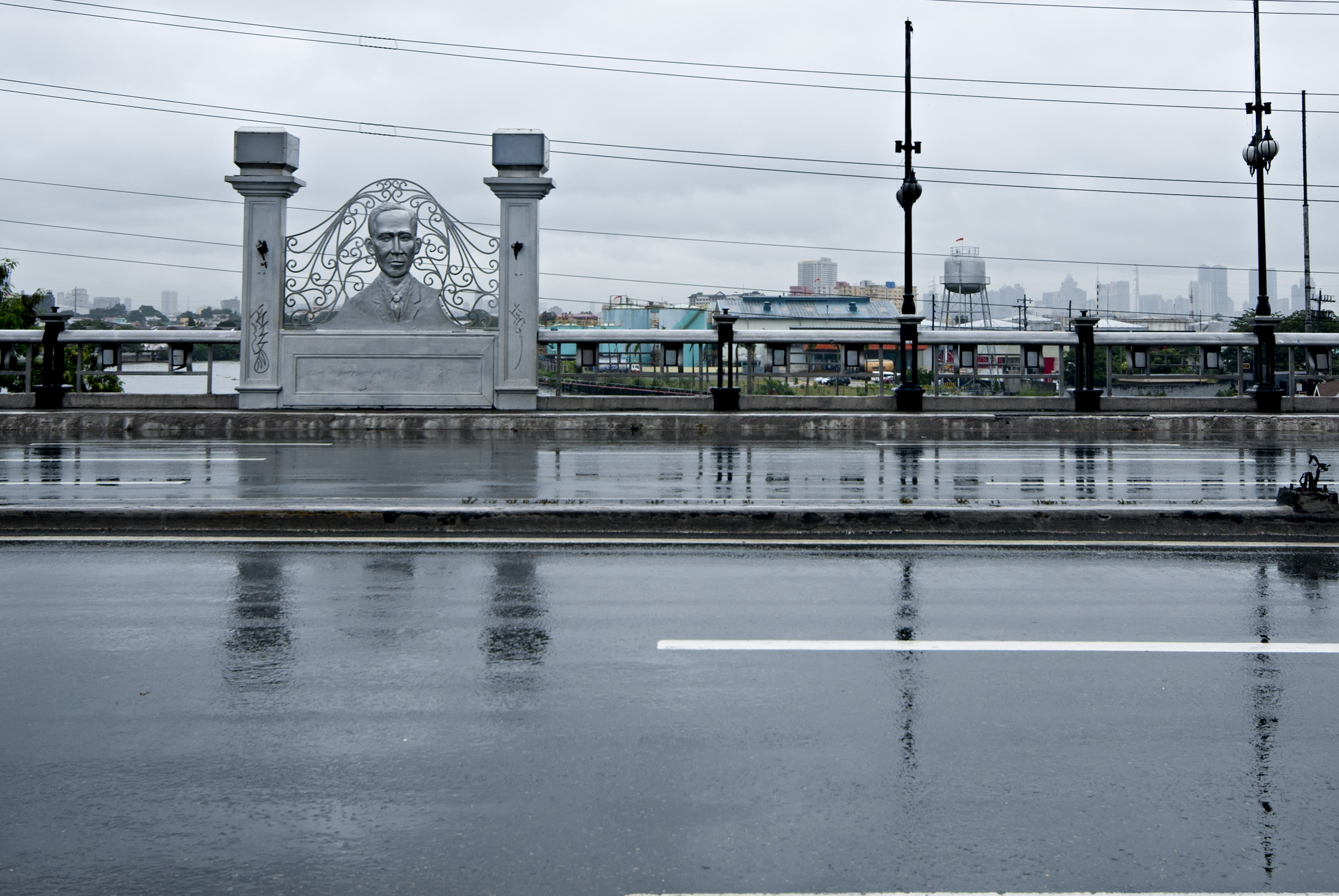
- Coordinates: 14°35′45″N 121°00′05″E
- Carries: 8 lanes of N140 (Circumferential Road 2), vehicular traffic and pedestrians
- Crosses: Pasig River
- Locale: Manila, Philippines
- Other name(s): Nagtahan Bridge
- Named for: Apolinario Mabini
- Maintained by: Department of Public Works and Highways - North Manila District Engineering Office
- Preceded by: Ayala Bridge
- Followed by: Nagtahan Link Bridge; Pandacan Rail Bridge

Characteristics
- Material: Concrete
- Total length: 201 m (659 ft)
- Width: 26.40 m (86.6 ft)
- No. of spans: 17
- Load limit: 20 t (20,000 kg)
- No. of lanes: 8 (4 per direction)

History
- Constructed by: US Army Corps of Engineers
- Construction end: 1945

The Mabini Bridge, formerly and still referred to as the Nagtahan Bridge, is a road bridge crossing the Pasig River between Nagtahan Street in Santa Mesa and Quirino Avenue in Paco to the west and Pandacan to the east. It was constructed between January and February 1945. It initially served as a pontoon bridge transporting U.S. Army jeeps and evacuating citizens caught in the crossfire during the Liberation of Manila.

== History ==
There were plans for a new bridge to connect the Mendiola route to Malacañang Palace was made even before the emergence of World War II. However, the construction did not push through. The pontoon bridge stood for several decades after World War II despite the construction materials used to build it. It was made out of inflated rubber rafts placed side by side - spanning until the opposite bank of the Pasig River. Two parallel perforated steel planks, each measuring about 1 meter (3.3 ft) wide and 1.5 meters (4.9 ft) apart were laid upon its surface. It was built by the US Army Corps of Engineers - enough to carry pedestrian traffic and light vehicles. On August 17, 1960, a barge collided with the wooden piles of the bridge. It caused major damage to the bridge, which caused flooding within the nearby residences.

In 1963, a permanent bridge was constructed, named Nagtahan. It connected Paco with Pandacan. However, the Mabini Shrine, the former residence of Apolinario Mabini, was situated on the north bank. The government, then, relocated the house at the Polytechnic University of the Philippines in Santa Mesa. To commemorate the 103rd birth anniversary of Apolinario Mabini on July 22, 1967, President Ferdinand Marcos issued Proclamation No. 234, s. 1967, renaming Nagtahan Bridge as the Mabini Bridge, in memory of Apolinario Mabini, the Sublime Paralytic.

In 2014, the Presidential Communications Development and Strategic Planning Office (PCDSPO) recommended that the Department of Public Works and Highways (DPWH) change the existing road signs to read Mabini Bridge as a fitting contribution to the Mabini Sesquicentennial.

== Present condition ==
Of the 13 bridges crossing the Pasig River as of 1998, only the Mabini Bridge did not undergo major face-lifting procedures that year. Its distinctive feature is its huge brass profiles on the sides, which illuminate at varying hues.

=== Marker from the National Historical Commission ===
The marker of the Mabini Bridge was installed on July 22, 1967, on the occasion of the 103rd birth anniversary of Apolinario Mabini. It was located along Nagtahan Boulevard, connecting Santa Mesa, Manila, and Paco, Manila.

Filipino inscription	English inscription
ANG TULAY NA ITO, DATING NAGTAHAN, AY PINANGALANANG TULAY MABINI NG PANGULONG FERDINAND E. MARCOS NOONG HULYO 22, 1967 NANG IPAGDIWANG ANG IKA-103 KAARAWAN NI APOLINARIO MABINI.	THIS BRIDGE, FORMERLY CALLED NAGTAHAN, WAS RENAMED MABINI BRIDGE ON THE OCCASION OF THE 103RD ANNIVERSARY OF APOLINARIO MABINI. ON 22 JULY 1967, BY PRESIDENT FERDINAND E. MARCOS.

== See also ==
- List of crossings of the Pasig River
