= Circumferential Road 1 =

Road in the Philippines

C-1 Circumferential Road 1
- C-1 Road
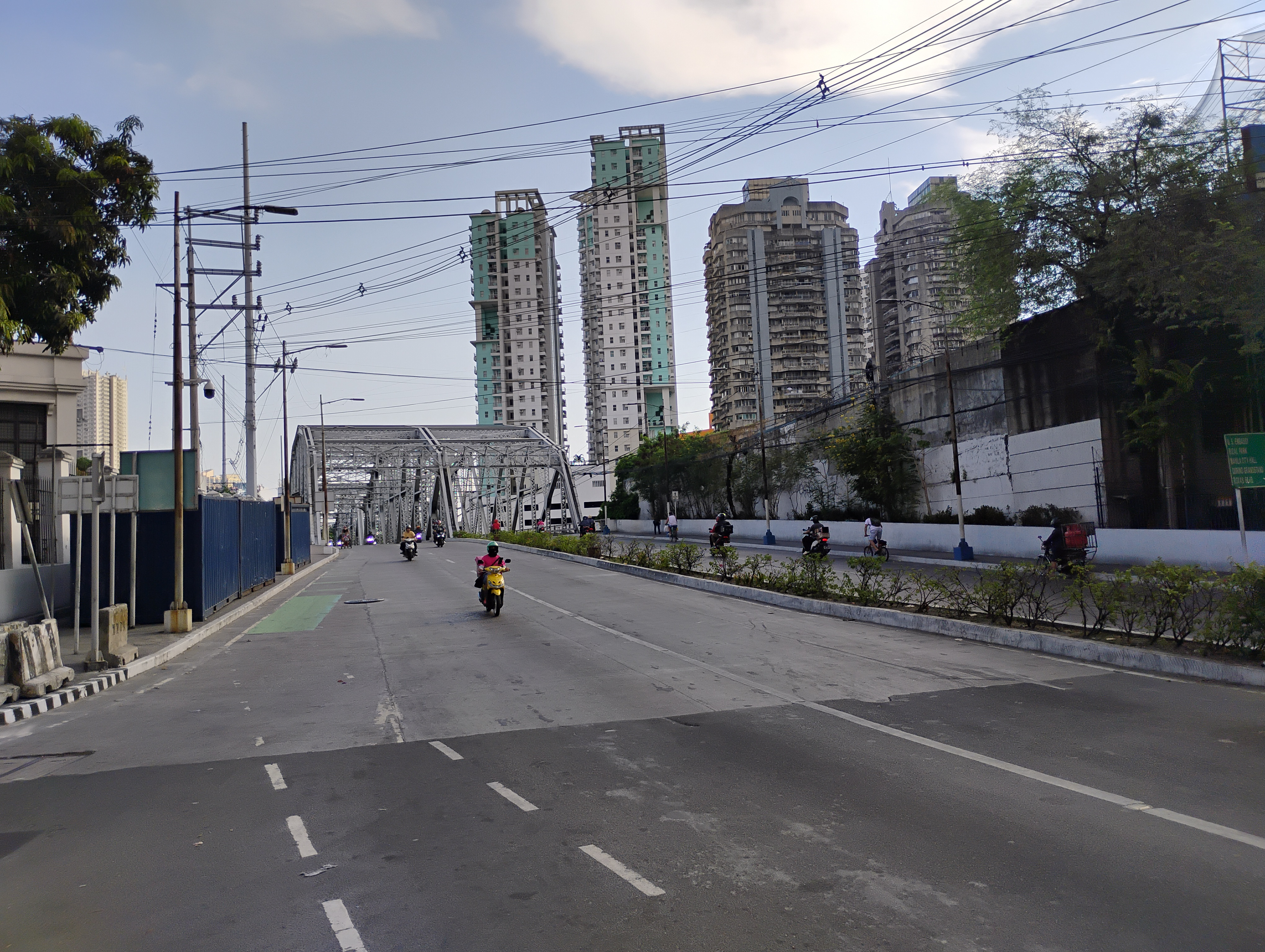
- P. Casal Street, a component street of C-1, towards Ayala Bridge

Route information
- Maintained by the Department of Public Works and Highways (DPWH) and the Metropolitan Manila Development Authority (MMDA)
- Length: 5.98 km (3.72 mi)
- Component highways: N145 (Recto Avenue); N180 (Legarda Street, Nepomuceno Street, P. Casal Street, Ayala Boulevard, and Finance Drive); N150 (Padre Burgos Avenue)

Major junctions
- North end: AH 26 (N120) (Mel Lopez Boulevard) in Tondo and San Nicolas, Manila
- South end: AH 26 (N120) (Roxas Boulevard and Bonifacio Drive) in Ermita and Intramuros, Manila

Location
- Country: Philippines
- Major cities: Manila

Highway system
- Roads in the Philippines; Highways; Expressways; List

Circumferential Road 1 (C-1), informally known as the C-1 Road, is a network of roads and bridges which comprise the first and innermost beltway of Metro Manila in the Philippines. Spanning some 5.98 kilometers (3.72 mi), it connects the districts of Ermita, Intramuros, San Miguel, Quiapo, Sampaloc, Santa Cruz, Binondo, San Nicolas, and Tondo in Manila.

== History ==
The development of a major road network in Manila was first conceived in the Metropolitan Thoroughfare Plan of 1945, predicting that the metropolis would expand further to the shorelines of Laguna de Bay. The plan proposed the laying of circumferential roads 1 to 6 and radial roads 1 to 10.

== Route description ==
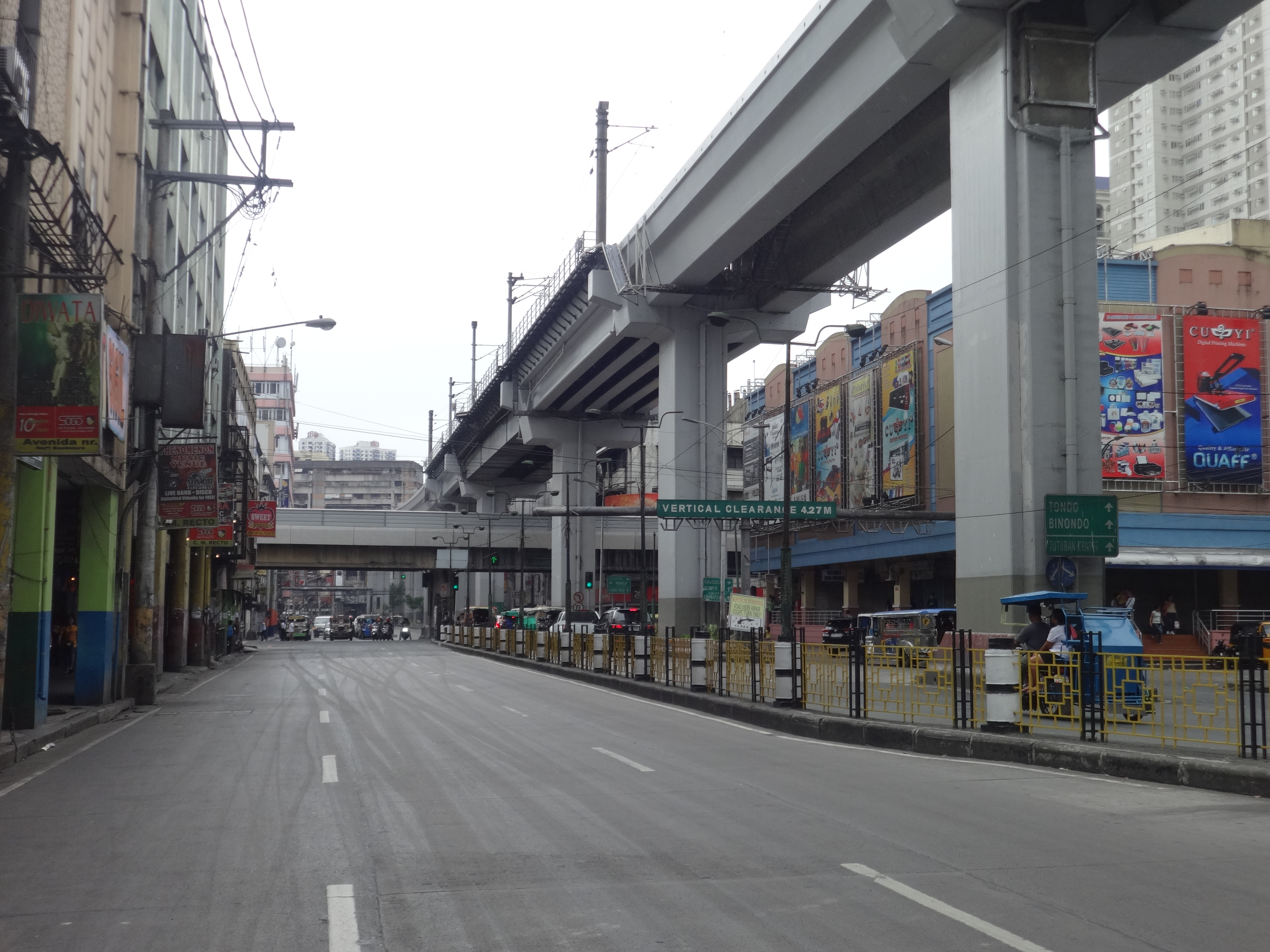
Recto Avenue

=== Recto Avenue ===
Between its northern terminus at the Manila North Harbor and Mendiola Street, C-1 is known as Recto Avenue. It begins at the intersection with Mel Lopez Boulevard (R-10) at the border between Tondo and San Nicolas and runs the entire length of Recto Avenue, passing through Binondo, Santa Cruz, Quiapo, and Sampaloc up to the intersection with Mendiola Street and Legarda Street (R-6). LRT Line 2 currently runs above the avenue eastwards from Alonzo Street.

=== Legarda Street ===
C-1 turns south on Legarda Street in Quiapo by the San Sebastian Church until it meets Nepomuceno Street by the National Teachers College.

=== Nepomuceno Street ===
C-1 then merges with Nepomuceno Street briefly until it meets P. Casal Street at the intersection with Arlegui Street.

=== P. Casal Street ===
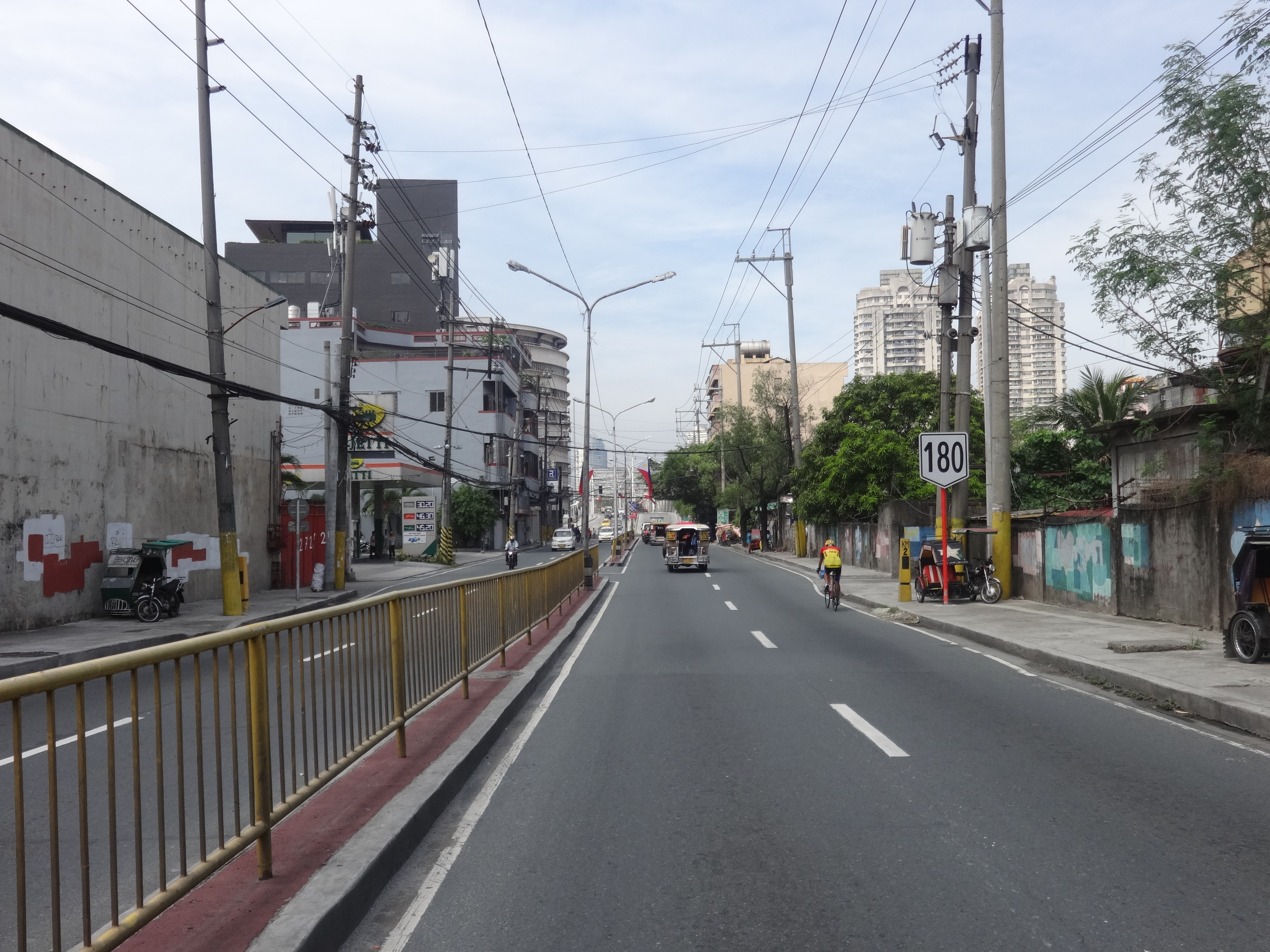
P. Casal Street

Between Arlegui Street and Ayala Bridge, which crosses the Pasig River and Isla de Convalecencia, C-1 is known as P. Casal Street. It passes the Technological Institute of the Philippines campus in Quiapo and enters San Miguel after crossing the Estero de San Miguel. It intersects with General Solano Street and Carlos Palanca Sr. Street, which provides access to the Malacañang Palace complex and the commercial area of Quiapo, respectively, before reaching the Ayala Bridge.

=== Ayala Boulevard ===
Between the Ayala Bridge and Taft Avenue in Ermita, C-1 is known as Ayala Boulevard. It runs through the Concepcion and Arroceros Streets, passing the Philippine Normal University and the Technological University of the Philippines campuses before intersecting with Taft Avenue to become Finance Road.

=== Finance Road ===
In the northeast section of Rizal Park by the National Museum of Fine Arts and National Museum of Anthropology (the former Finance Building), C-1 becomes the short Finance Road until it merges with Padre Burgos Avenue near the intersection with Maria Orosa Street.

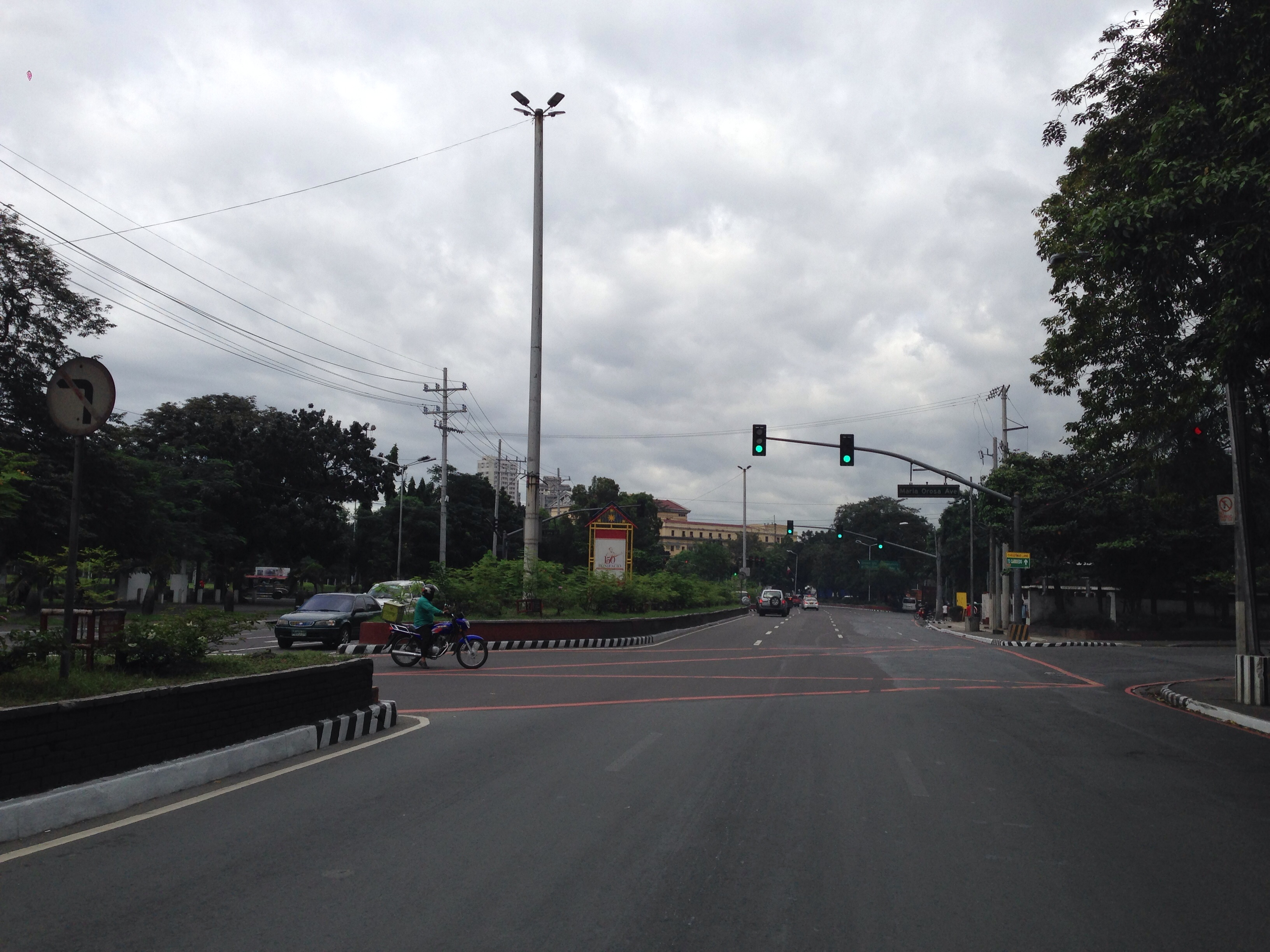
Padre Burgos Avenue near its intersection with Maria Orosa Avenue

=== Padre Burgos Avenue ===
Padre Burgos Avenue carries C-1 between Rizal Park and Intramuros to its terminus at Roxas Boulevard and Bonifacio Drive, both components of R-1.
