= San Miguel, Manila =

District of Manila, Metro Manila, Philippines

Coordinates: 14.600°N 121.000°E

San Miguel
- District of Manila
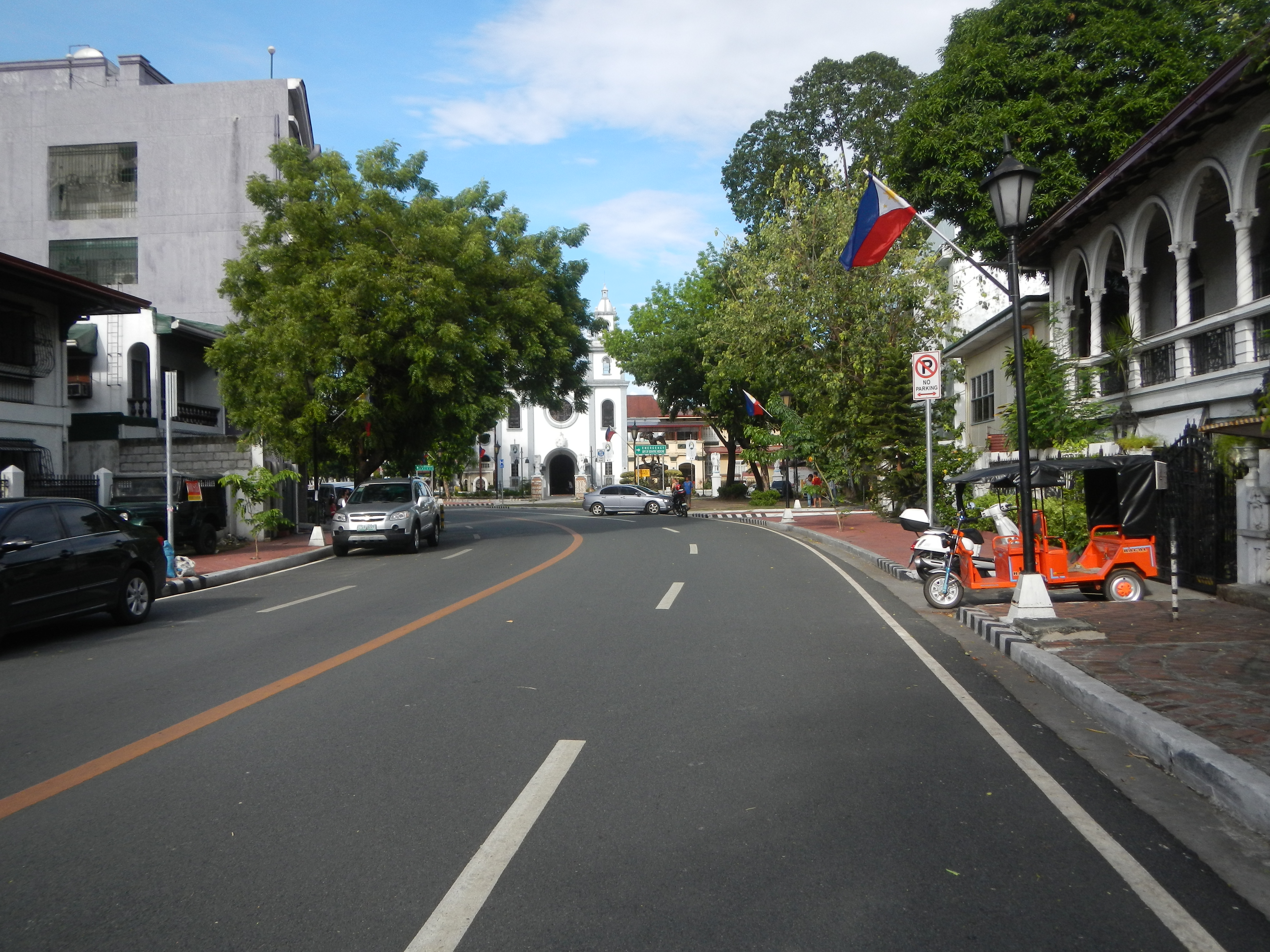
- Jose P. Laurel Street looking towards the San Miguel Church

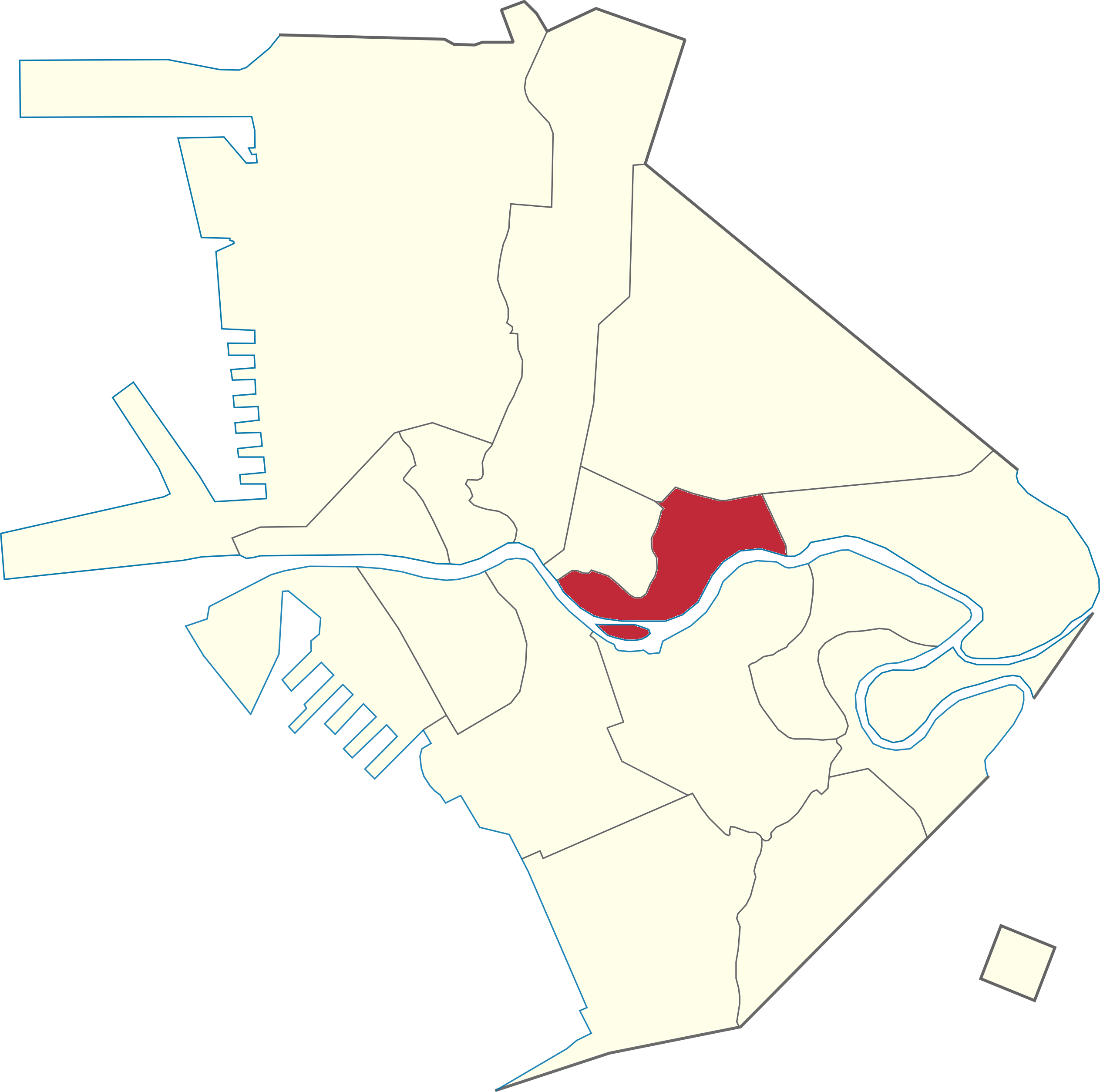
- Country: Philippines
- Region: National Capital Region
- City: Manila
- Congressional district: 6th District
- Barangays: 12

Area
  - Total: 0.9137 km^{2} (0.3528 sq mi)

Population (2019)
  - Total: 18,599
  - Density: 20,360/km^{2} (52,720/sq mi)
- Time zone: UTC+08:00 (Philippine Standard Time)
- ZIP code: 1005
- Area codes: 02

San Miguel (Tagalog pronunciation: [sɐn mɪˈɡɛl]) is a primarily middle-class residential area of the City of Manila and is one of the city's sixteen traditional districts.

== Background ==
Much of San Miguel is located on a riverine island, separated by the mainland by the Estero de (Stream of) San Miguel, and by the Pasig River. In order to reach the district, one has to cross any of the following bridges traversing Estero de San Miguel, from west to east: Carlos Palanca Bridge, P. Casal Bridge, Nepomunceno Bridge, Arlegui Bridge, San Rafael Bridge, Chino Roces Bridge (carrying Mendiola Street), Concepcion Aguila Bridge and J.P. Laurel Bridge. P. Casal Bridge's logical extension is the Ayala Bridge, that connects it to the southern bank of the Pasig.

On the district's eastern parts is another riverine island, bounded by the Estero de San Miguel and Estero de Sampaloc. A small part is on the mainland, at the far eastern corner.

San Miguel also includes the Isla de Convalecencia, the largest island in the Pasig River, which is home to the Hospício de San José, Manila's oldest Catholic welfare institution.

Malacañang Palace, the seat of the Government of the Philippines and official residence of the President of the Philippines, is located in the neighborhood, and outside the Palace gates is Mendiola Street, a popular site for protests against the government.

The San Miguel district is also home to some colleges and universities that form part of Manila's "University Belt" which encompasses San Miguel, and the districts of Quiapo and Sampaloc. Educational institutions that are located in the district include Far Eastern University, San Beda University, Centro Escolar University, College of the Holy Spirit, Saint Jude Catholic School, La Consolacion College Manila and Victorino Mapa High School.

San Miguel Brewery, where the popular San Miguel Beer was originally produced beginning in the Spanish colonial era, was located and, hence, named after San Miguel district. The brewery's buildings were demolished after the property was transferred to the Philippine government, and it today forms part of the Palace complex.

== Etymology ==
According to the writer Nick Joaquin, the island where San Miguel is now centered in was referred to in ancient times as "Malacañang" or "Malakanyan", which was the Tagalog term that meant "there are great ones there".

After the Spaniards arrived in the area, they renamed the island as San Miguel after the archangel Saint Michael.

== History ==
=== Precolonial era ===
San Miguel used to be one of the many places occupied by the precolonial Tagalog polity once known as Namayan, centered around the modern-day barangay of Namayan in Mandaluyong and eventually in Sapa (the district of Santa Ana in Manila), once ruled by a lord known as Lakantagkan with his wife Bouan.

=== Spanish era and founding ===
After the Spaniards arrived, the island of Malakanyang was annexed as a barrio of Dilao (now known as Paco, Manila). However, in 1591, the Jesuits set up a Japanese mission in the island.

In 1611, the Spaniards continued to accommodate Japanese Christians who were persecuted by the Tokugawa Shogunate. It was Justo Takayama, a feudal lord, who led a group of approximately 300 Japanese Christians to the Philippines in 1614.

In 1618, the then Japanese mission in Malakanyan, formerly a barrio of Dilao became known as the parish of San Miguel, a Jesuit creation independent of the Franciscan town of San Fernando Rey.

The Jesuits under the leadership of Fr. Marcelo Francisco Mastrili built the National Shrine of San Miguel de Arcangel in 1630 as an act of gratitude by the Spanish governor-general Sebastián Hurtado de Corcuera who had miraculously escaped death on a military campaign. Since then, Japanese migrants began migrating into the region en masse by the 17th-18th centuries.

Eventually, relations between the Spaniards and Japan had worsened. Missionaries from the Philippines were being martyred in Nagasaki and in 1637, Japan closed itself to the world in what was known as the Sakoku, prohibiting any entrance of foreigners in most areas of Japan.

The Church of San Miguel was damaged during the 1645 Luzon earthquake and during the British occupation of Manila as part of the Seven Years' War in 1762.

==== Expulsion of Jesuits ====
On August 1, 1768, the Philippine Jesuits, numbering 64 were deported from the island on board the Acapulco Galleon San Carlos by the decree of expulsion by King Carlos III of Spain. The Society had served 187 years in the Philippines. The Jesuit expulsion left the parish of the town without pastors. It was ordered attached to the parish of Quiapo and for the next 9 years was under the ministry of the secular order. In 1777 it was placed in the care of the Franciscan friars.

==== Fire of 1778 and rebuilding ====
In 1778, San Miguel was sent on fire, erasing the whole arrabal. The civil authorities forbade the rebuilding of the village and ordered the transfer of the parish to the opposite side of the parish. Fr. Felix de Huerta gives 1783 as the year San Miguel crossed the river. On its new location San Miguel had as its first Franciscan parish priest Fr. Pedro Malo de Molina, who in 1799 started constructing a provisional parish church the camarin or bodega-like structure that later parrocos would recall with a shudder as being squat and ugly. The new shrine of St. Michael took 36 years and 17 parish priests to construct, finally being inaugurated by Fr. Esteban Mena in 1835 although the interior was incomplete.

In 1859, Barrio Uli-uli, formerly part of Pandacan, was annexed to San Miguel, extending the limit of the arrabal to that’s now a Santa Mesa Rotunda. In 1871, Doña Margarita Róxas de Ayala, matriarch of the clan now known as the Ayala, funded the reconstruction of San Miguel parish rectory.

=== American era ===
On August 13, 1898, as a result of the capitulation of Spanish forces in the mock Battle of Manila, San Miguel was one of the towns placed under American occupation and was never liberated by Filipino forces since then. In 1917, the arrabal of San Miguel was created a district of the City of Manila, which had been divided into 14 districts. The limits of the district were proclaimed as being: Azcarraga (CM Recto) to Alix (Legarda), then Alix to Nagtahan, then the Pasig River to the Isla de Convalescencia, then the Isla to the Estero de San Miguel (where began Calle Echague, now Palanca), then Calle Mendiola to the point of beginning on Alix.

=== World War II ===
During the war, Commonwealth authorities declared the City of Manila as an open city to the Japanese forces to avoid its mutual destruction. By January 2, 1942, the Imperial Japanese Army reached Manila and occupied San Miguel. On February 4, 1945, American forces reached San Miguel, kicking the Japanese out of the region.

=== People Power Revolution ===
On February 22, 1986, the People Power Revolution erupted in Metro Manila, which was started by the Reformed the Armed Forces Movement before transpiring into a popular movement. By the 25th, the revolution had reached San Miguel. Government forces and civilians were injured in a clash at Nagtahan Street in the early morning. Not long after, President Ferdinand Marcos evacuated Malacañang for Hawaii and supporters of Corazon Aquino stormed the Malacañang Palace.

== Barangays ==
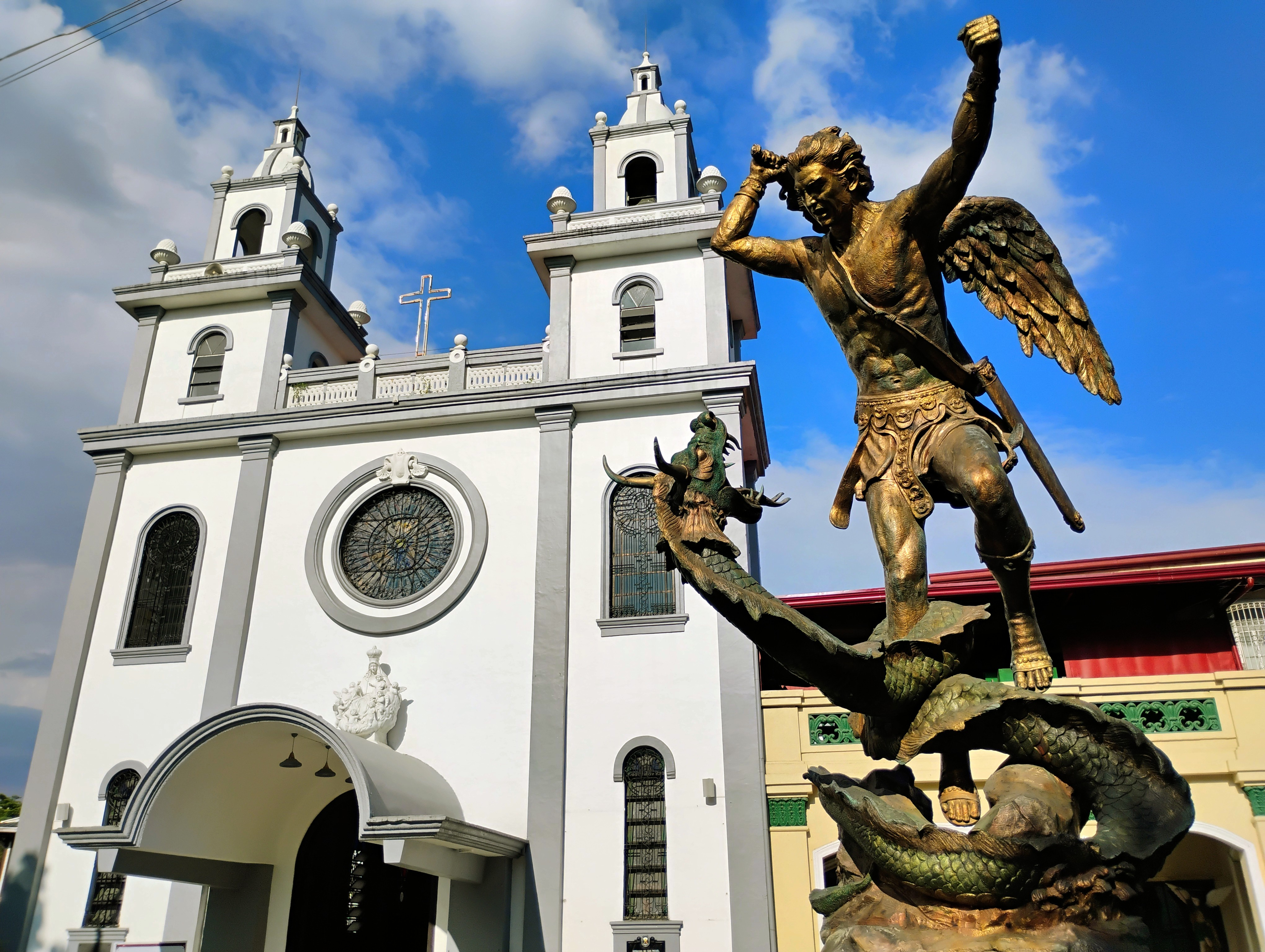
The National Shrine of Saint Michael and the Archangels, the church for which the district was named.

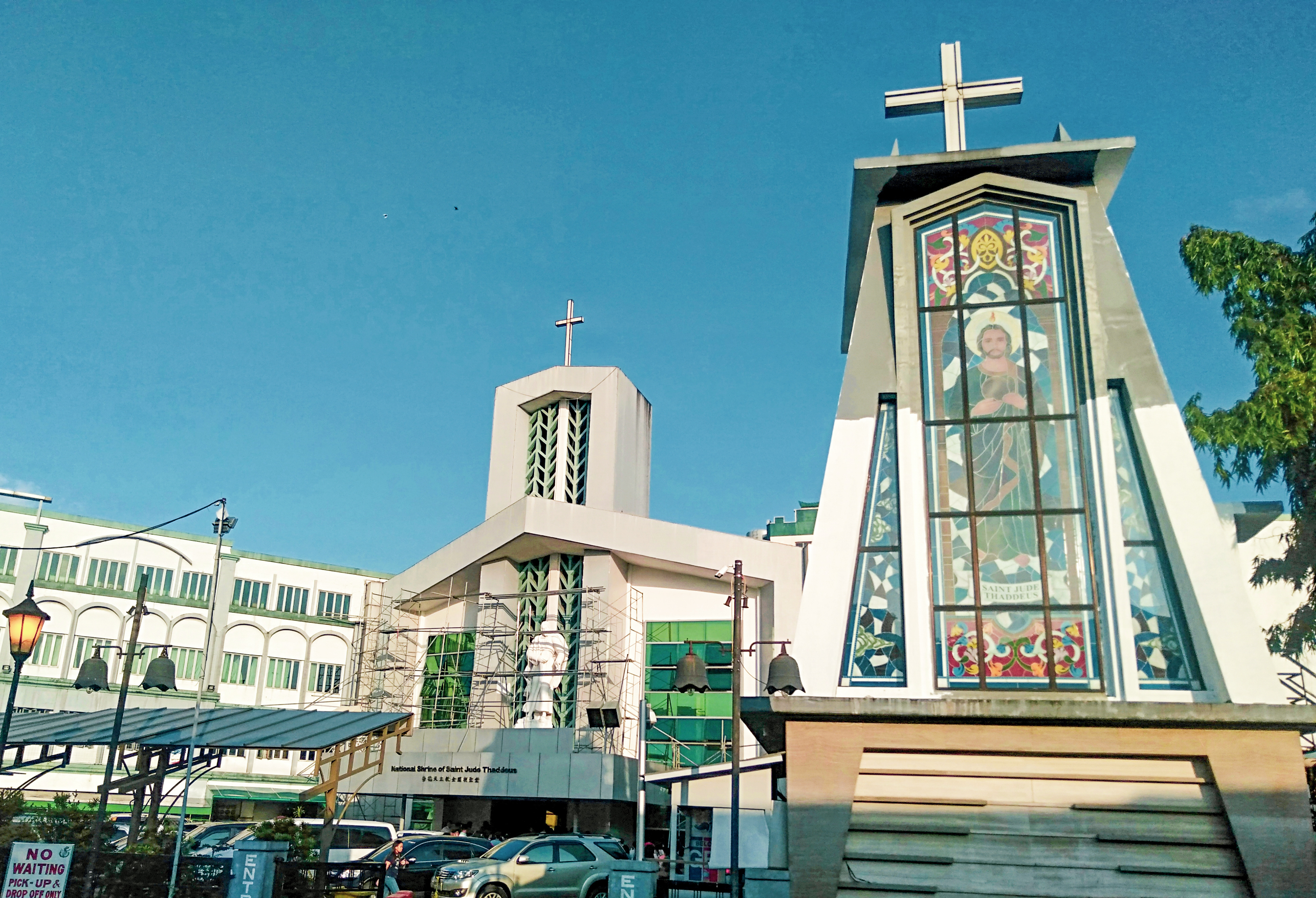
National Shrine of St. Jude Thaddeus

San Miguel is divided into 12 barangays, grouped in three zones of the City of Manila. Barangays 637 to 640 are part of Zone 65, while Barangays 641 to 644 are part of Zone 66 and Barangays 645 to 648 are part of Zone 67.

Barangays of San Miguel

Barangay	Land area (km²)	Population (2020)
Zone 65
Barangay 637	0.03124	1,295
Barangay 638	0.1254	545
Barangay 639	0.03027	490
Barangay 640	0.1055	2,145
Zone 66
Barangay 641	0.08799	763
Barangay 642	0.05602	1,279
Barangay 643	0.1319	657
Barangay 644	0.02500	729
Zone 67
Barangay 645	0.08413	1,704
Barangay 646	0.06953	918
Barangay 647	0.1157	2,440
Barangay 648	0.04226	5,634

== Attractions ==
=== Casa Roces ===
Casa Roces is a 1930s ancestral house of the Roces family which was renovated and turned into a full-service restaurant, café and an art gallery. Casa Roces is located in the district of San Miguel, Manila right across Malacañan Palace, the official residence of the President of the Republic of the Philippines.

Casa Roces was designed in the Pre-war modernist style with Art Deco articulation using a variety of construction materials which includes reinforced concrete, wood and masonry. On the ground floor, the distinguishing feature is the use of "Machuca" tile flooring which is typical with Commonwealth era house. The original layout of the rooms were changed to accommodate its new use as a restaurant and an art gallery.

== Notable people ==
- Angelo Reyes
- Imelda Marcos
- Chino Roces
- Margarita Róxas de Ayala
