= Ayala Bridge =

Main bridge in Manila, Philippines

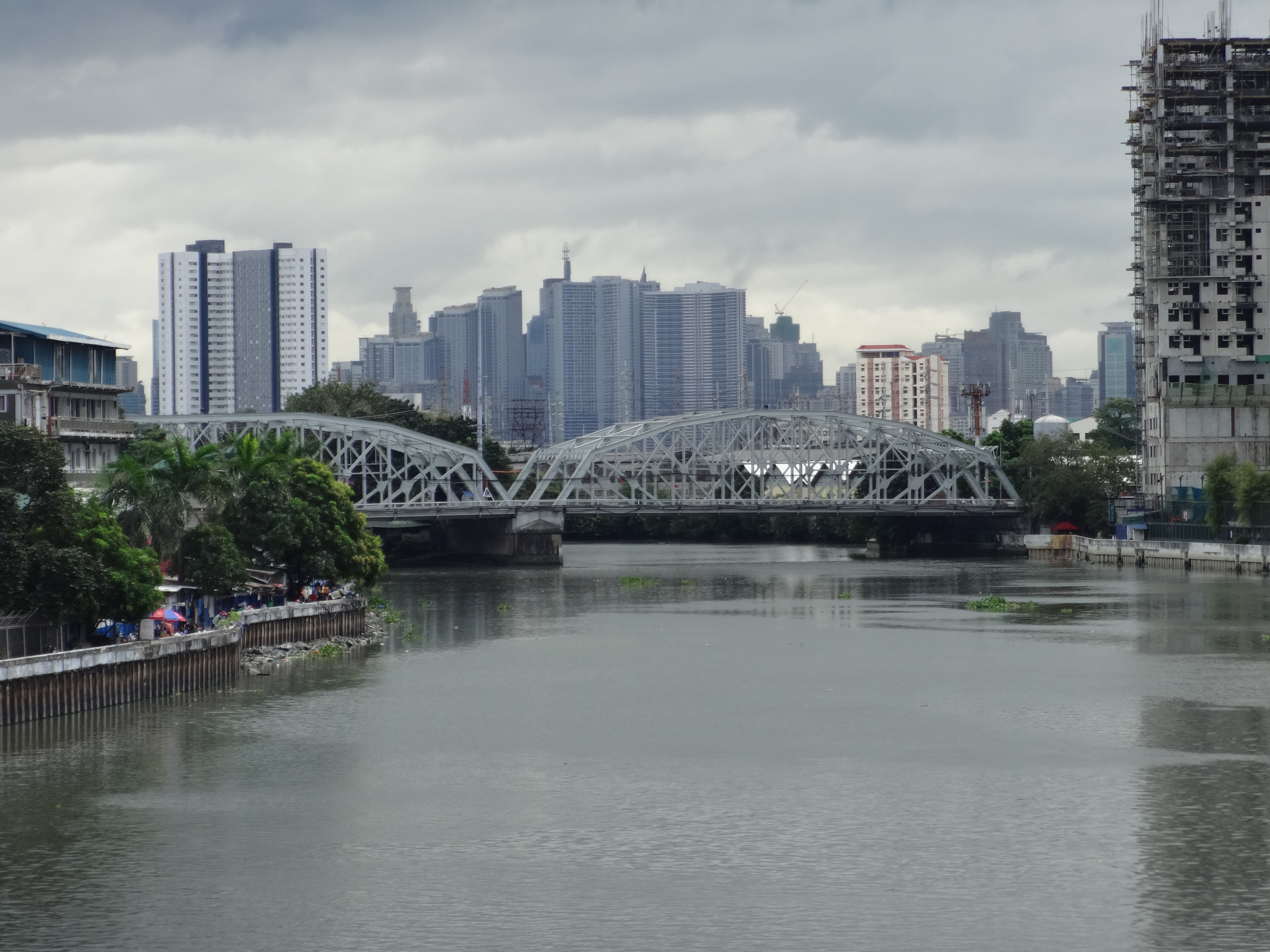
- Ayala Bridge in 2020
- Coordinates: 14°35′28.6″N 120°59′11.1″E
- Carries: Four lanes of N180 and C-1, vehicular traffic and pedestrians
- Crosses: Pasig River
- Locale: Manila
- Other name: Puente de Ayala
- Maintained by: Department of Public Works and Highways – South Manila District Engineering Office
- Preceded by: Quezon Bridge
- Followed by: Mabini Bridge

Characteristics
- Material: Steel
- Total length: 142 m (466 ft)
- Width: 23.5 m (77 ft)
- No. of spans: 2
- Piers in water: 1
- Load limit: 20 t (20,000 kg)
- No. of lanes: 4 (2 per direction)

History
- Constructed by: Don Jacobo Zóbel y Zangroniz
- Construction start: 1872
- Rebuilt: 1908 and 1930s

Location
- Interactive map of Ayala Bridge

The Ayala Bridge (Filipino: Tulay ng Ayala) is a steel truss bridge over the Pasig River in Manila, Philippines. It connects the districts of Ermita and San Miguel, passing over the western tip of Isla de Convalecencia. It carries Circumferential Road 1 (C-1) and National Route 180 (N180), linking Ayala Boulevard in Ermita to P. Casal Street in San Miguel.

== History ==
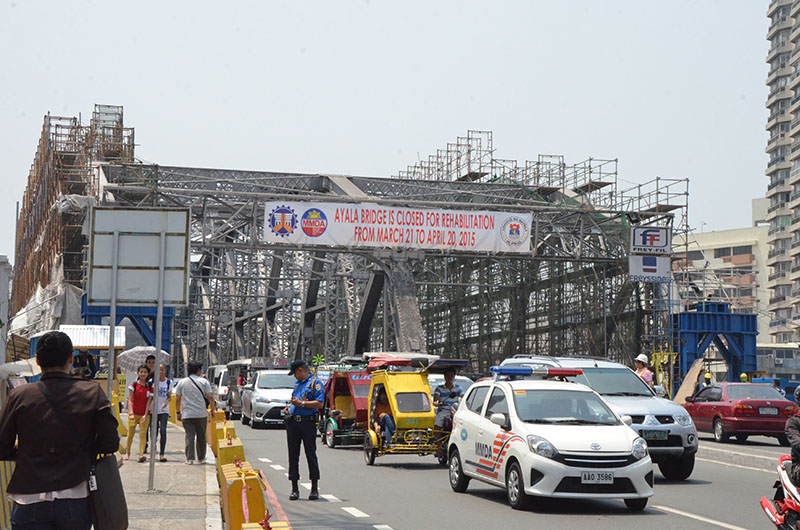
2015 rehabilitation of the bridge.

Ayala Bridge was originally two separate timber-built bridges (divided into the San Miguel and Concepcion sections after each side's point of origin, converging into Isla de la Convalecencia) (Note: The bridge was also sometimes called Puente de la Convalecencia.) when it was first built in 1872 by Don Jacobo Zangroniz Zóbel of Ayala y Compañía (now Ayala Corporation).

Roughly ten years after opened, the bridge's condition had degenerated considerably. In 1899, the San Miguel portion collapsed, with the Concepcion portion following suit months later. In 1908, the bridge became the first steel bridge in the Philippines. Its current form is attributed to a 1930s reconstruction, during which it was decided to unify the bridge in a singular route.

Ayala Bridge was closed to the public in early 2015 to undergo rehabilitation and structural repairs to ensure its integrity. It was raised by 70 centimeters (28 in), enabling it to withstand a 7.2-magnitude earthquake. The bridge fully reopened to motorists in November 2015.

Every January 9 of the year since 2020, the Metropolitan Manila Development Authority has closed the bridge for use as procession route during the Feast of the Black Nazarene.

== See also ==
- List of crossings of the Pasig River
- Media related to Ayala Bridge at Wikimedia Commons
