= Asilo de San Vicente de Paul =

Orphanage in Manila, Philippines

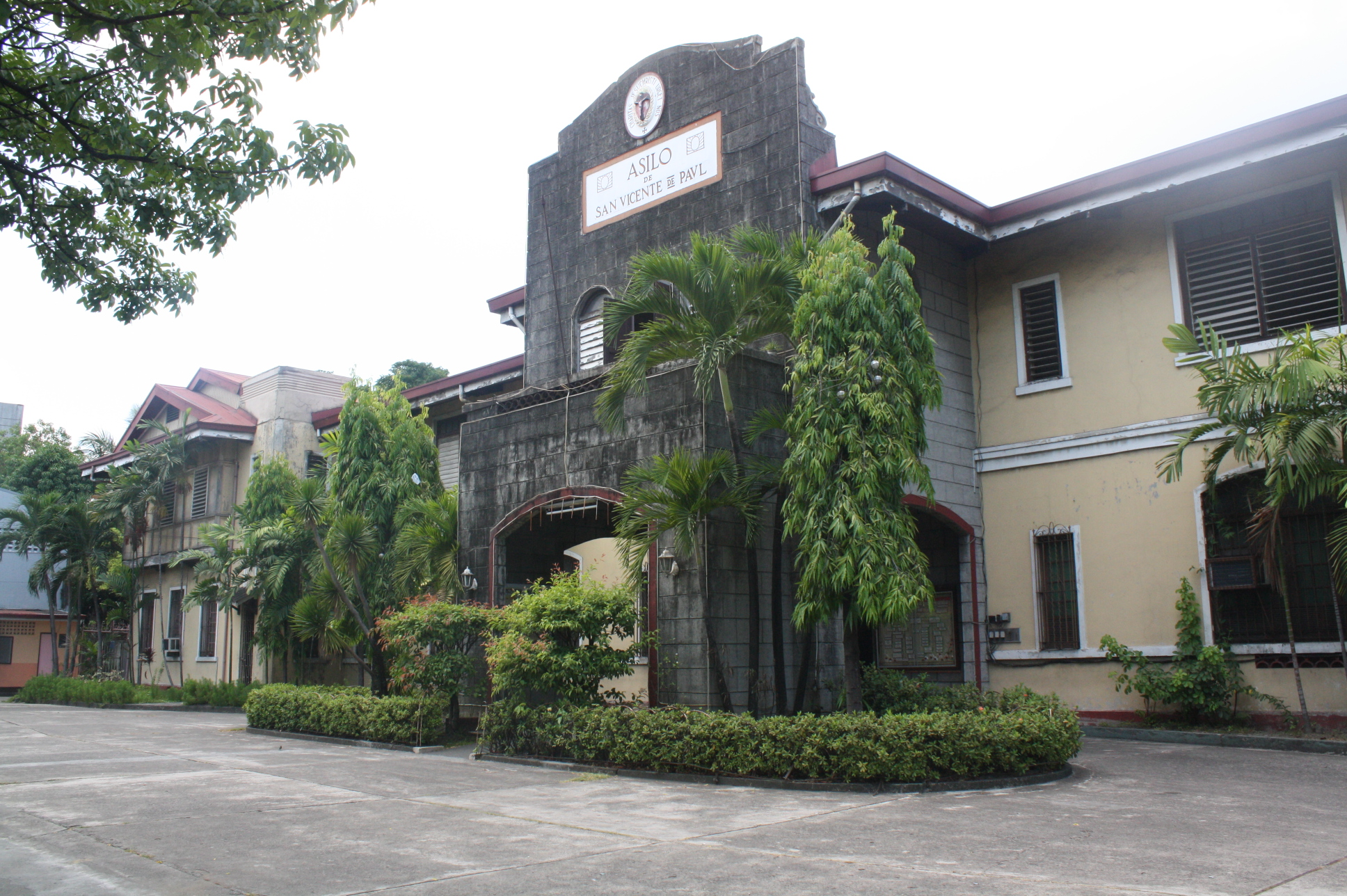
- Façade of the building
- Interactive map of the Asilo de San Vicente de Paul area
- Former names: Casa de San Vicente de Paul
- Alternative names: Looban Convent; Asilo de Looban

General information
- Coordinates: 14.584108°N 120.990564°E
- Completed: 1885
- Renovated: 1945

Asilo de San Vicente de Paul is an orphanage located on UN Avenue in Manila, Philippines. It is run by the Daughters of Charity of Saint Vincent de Paul.

== History ==
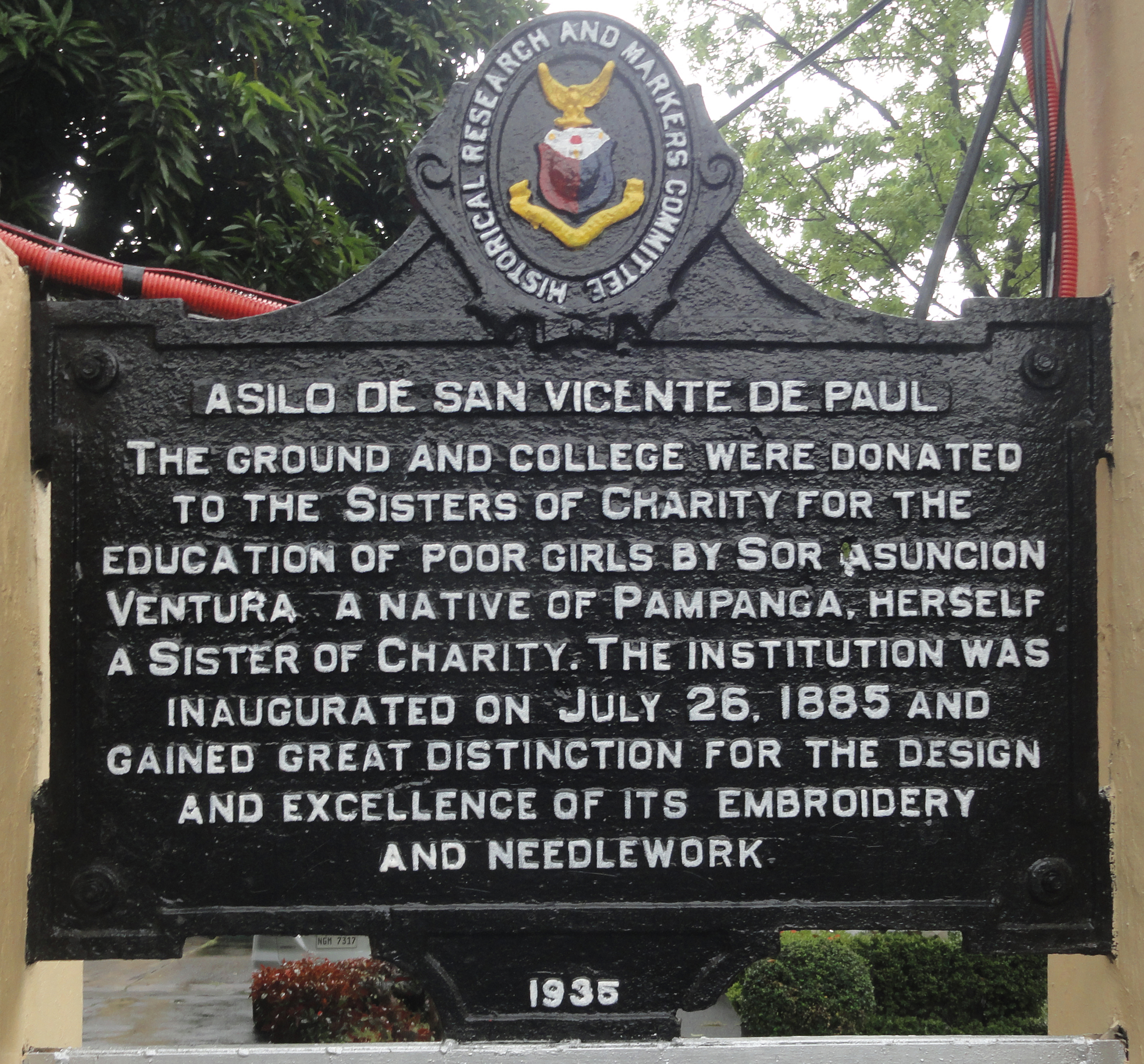
Historical marker installed in 1935

Asilo de San Vicente de Paul (ASVP), formerly known as Casa de San Vicente de Paul, was founded on 26 July 1885 by Sister Asunción Ventura, DC, a native of Bacolor, Pampanga. She donated an inheritance from her family to the Daughters of Charity and purchased a lot of six hectares of land for a building where she established the asylum for girls, making her the first Filipina to build an orphanage in the country.

ASVP began with 33 wards, specifically homeless or orphaned girls. Later on, it expanded its services into providing education and trade training to young girls, particularly in embroidery and needlework, which has become a distinction of the institution. The Spanish government provided a monthly supply of 20 cavans of rice to the orphanage, which was later continued by the Americans until government aid to charitable institutions was ceased due to the prohibition under the Jones Law. Over time, ASVP has sold portions of land until today it retains two hectares for the institution.

In the early days, affluent families visited ASVP to purchase the embroidered products of the girls. Others came to the institution to select wives for their sons among the older residents. The mother of former First Lady Imelda Marcos, Remedios Trinidad, was a ward of the ASVP, also known then as Looban Convent. The mother of Orestes Romuáldez, Imelda’s father, found Trinidad and introduced the couple.

In 1935, the ASVP was given a marker by the Historical Research and Markers Committee.

During World War II, Manila was bombed by the Imperial Japan, and in the conflagration the main buildings of the ASVP were burnt, causing some 200 fatalities. The structure was rebuilt in February 1945 following the city’s liberation. One of the benefactors of ASVP in its rebuilding was Don Teodoro V. Santos (1915-1983), a devout Catholic and philanthropist.

For a time, ASVP also operated as an educational institution but the school was gradually closed between 1982 and 1999 and the ASVP refocused on its role towards childcare services. It was also the temporary home of another institution, Tahanan Santa Luisa from 2000 to 2002.

== See also ==
- Hospicio de San Jose
