= Isla de Convalecencia =

River island in Manila, Philippines

Isla de la Convalecencia
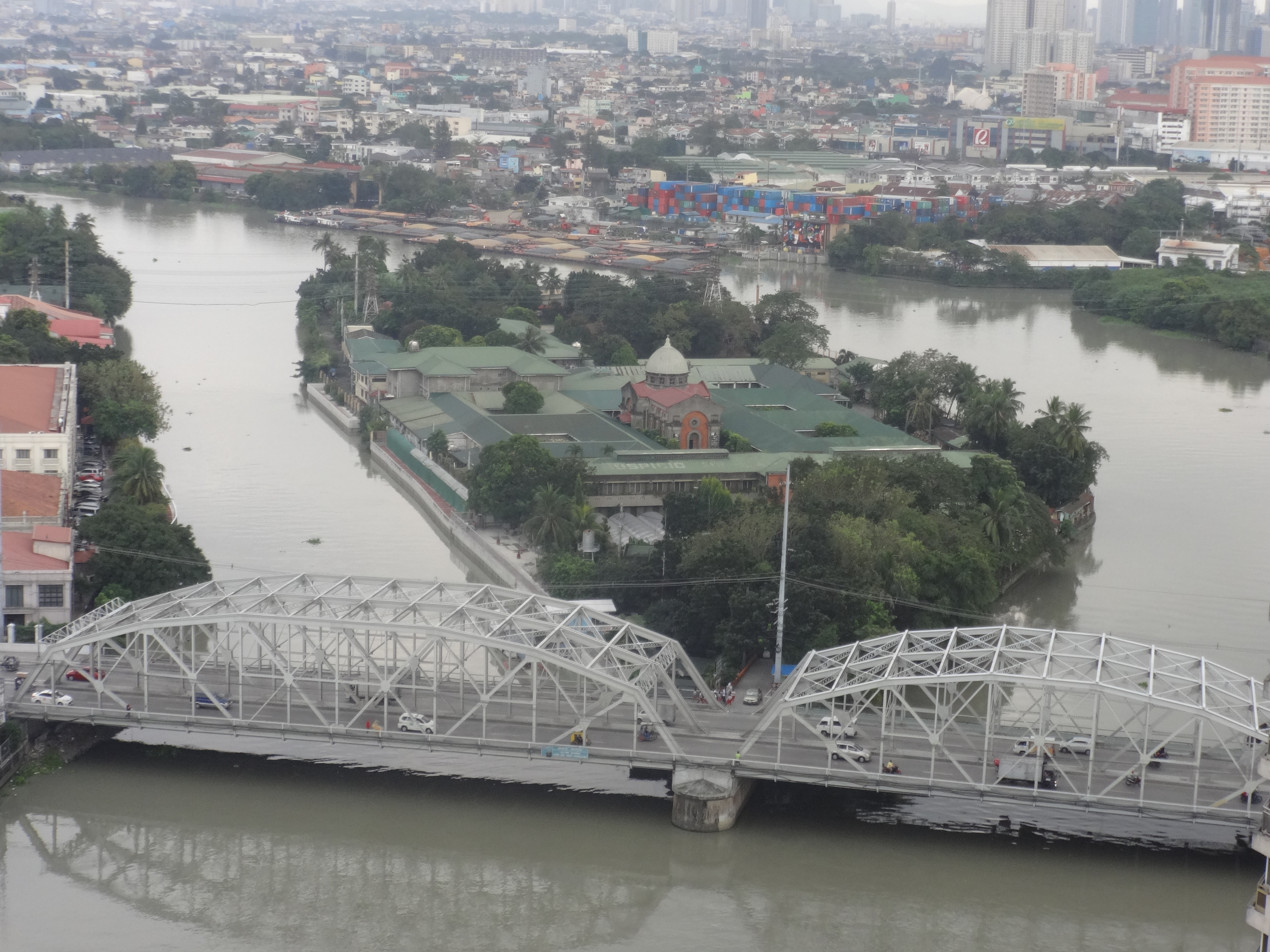
- The island in the middle of the Pasig River with the Ayala Bridge in its foreground, looking due east

- Location within Manila

Geography
- Location: Pasig River
- Coordinates: 14°35′26″N 120°59′20″E
- Area: 42,352.86 m^{2} (455,882.4 sq ft)

Administration
- Philippines
- City: Manila
- District: San Miguel
- Barangay: Barangay 646, Zone 67

Demographics
- Population: 403
- Pop. density: 841.75/km^{2} (2180.12/sq mi)

Additional information

Isla de la Convalecencia (lit. 'Island of Convalescence'), commonly known as simply Isla de Convalecencia (also spelled Isla de Convalescencia and sometimes erroneously called Isla de Convalencia), is a small narrow river island in the Pasig River in Manila, the Philippines. It is the only island dividing the Pasig River in Manila located between the districts of San Miguel on the north bank, and Ermita and Paco on the south. The island, best known as the location of the Hospicio de San José, is administratively part of San Miguel's Barangay 646, Zone 67. It has a total area of approximately 594 square meters (6,390 sq ft) and is connected to both sides of the river by the Ayala Bridge.

Although the island is primarily occupied by the Hospicio, it also hosts a detachment of the Philippine Coast Guard that patrols the periphery of the Malacañang Palace complex located just northwest of the island on the north bank of the Pasig River. The island hosts the Hospicio's small community which includes the 412 children, 64 disabled residents and 120 elderly residents.

== History ==
The island's name dates back to the 1830s when the Hospicio General was built and the island was used principally as a place of recuperation or convalescence for patients of the Hospital of San Juan de Dios. It was earlier called Isla de San Andrés (English: Saint Andrew’s Island) in honor of Don Andrés Blanco Vermúdez, who owned the island but later donated it to the San Juan de Dios religious order. Prior to the construction of the orphanage and hospital, the island was the site of two Spanish fortifications known as Bastión de San Rafael and Bastión de San Andrés. The Bastion de San Rafael located on the island's eastern end had its main gate facing the river with a large wharf made of piedra de China (granite stones). This structure has since been replaced by the convent hospital built by the San Juan de Dios religious order. On the island's southern portion facing San Fernando de Dilao (now Paco) and Concepción (now part of Ermita) was the Bastion de San Andres. The Hospicio General was originally housed in an old ruined building called Petruz on the island's western portion. It had a small chapel, two infirmaries and several wards. It was later renamed Hospicio de San José after Saint Joseph, the orphanage's patron saint.

== See also ==
- List of islands in the Greater Manila Area
