= Hospicio de San Jose =

Catholic welfare institution in Manila, Philippines

Coordinates: 14.591°N 120.988°E

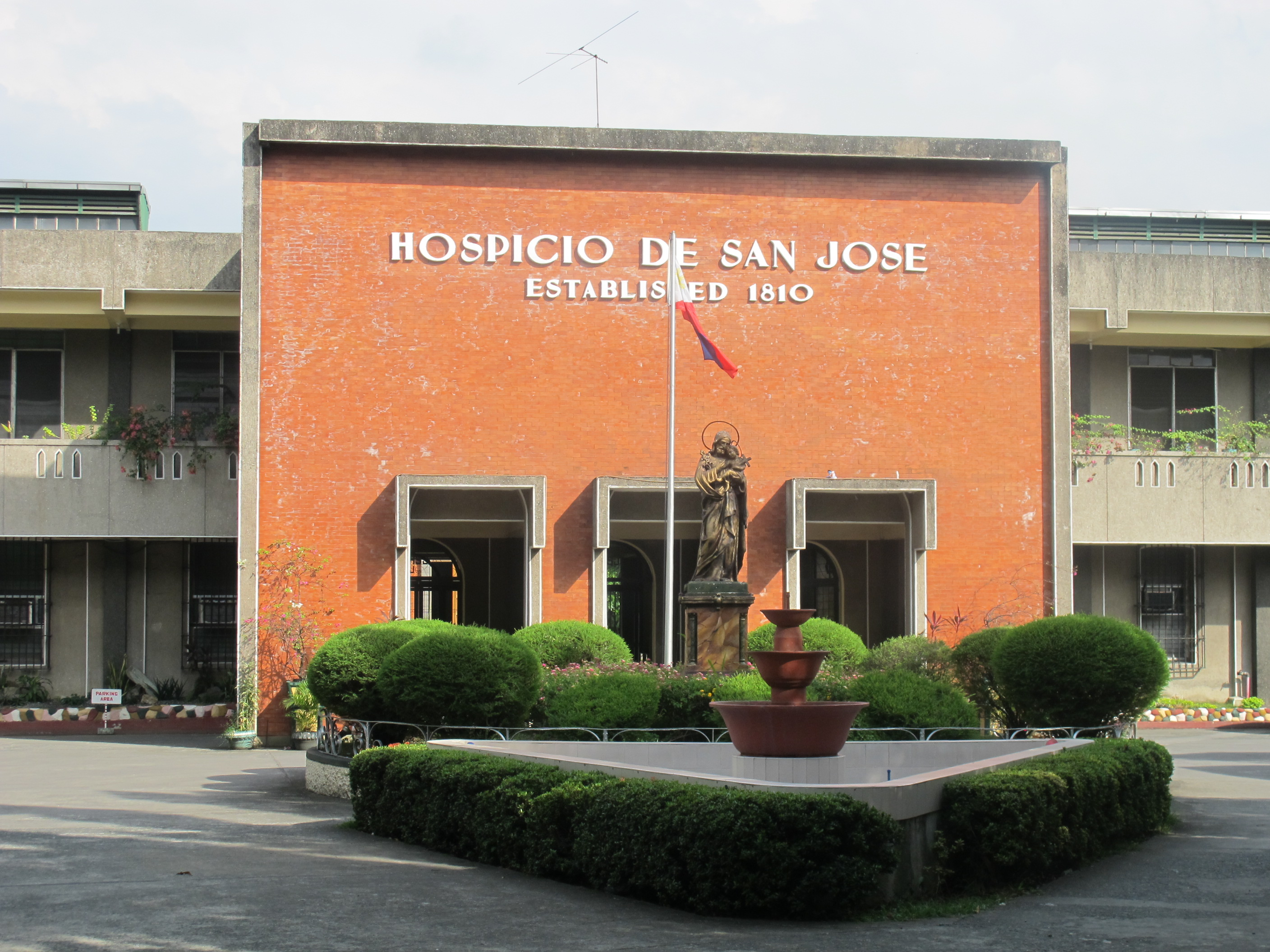
Façade of the Hospicio de San José.

Hospicio de San José is a Roman Catholic welfare institution in the City of Manila, the Philippines. It is the first social welfare agency in the country, and as a foster care institution has been a home for orphans, the abandoned, persons with special needs, and the elderly.

== Location ==
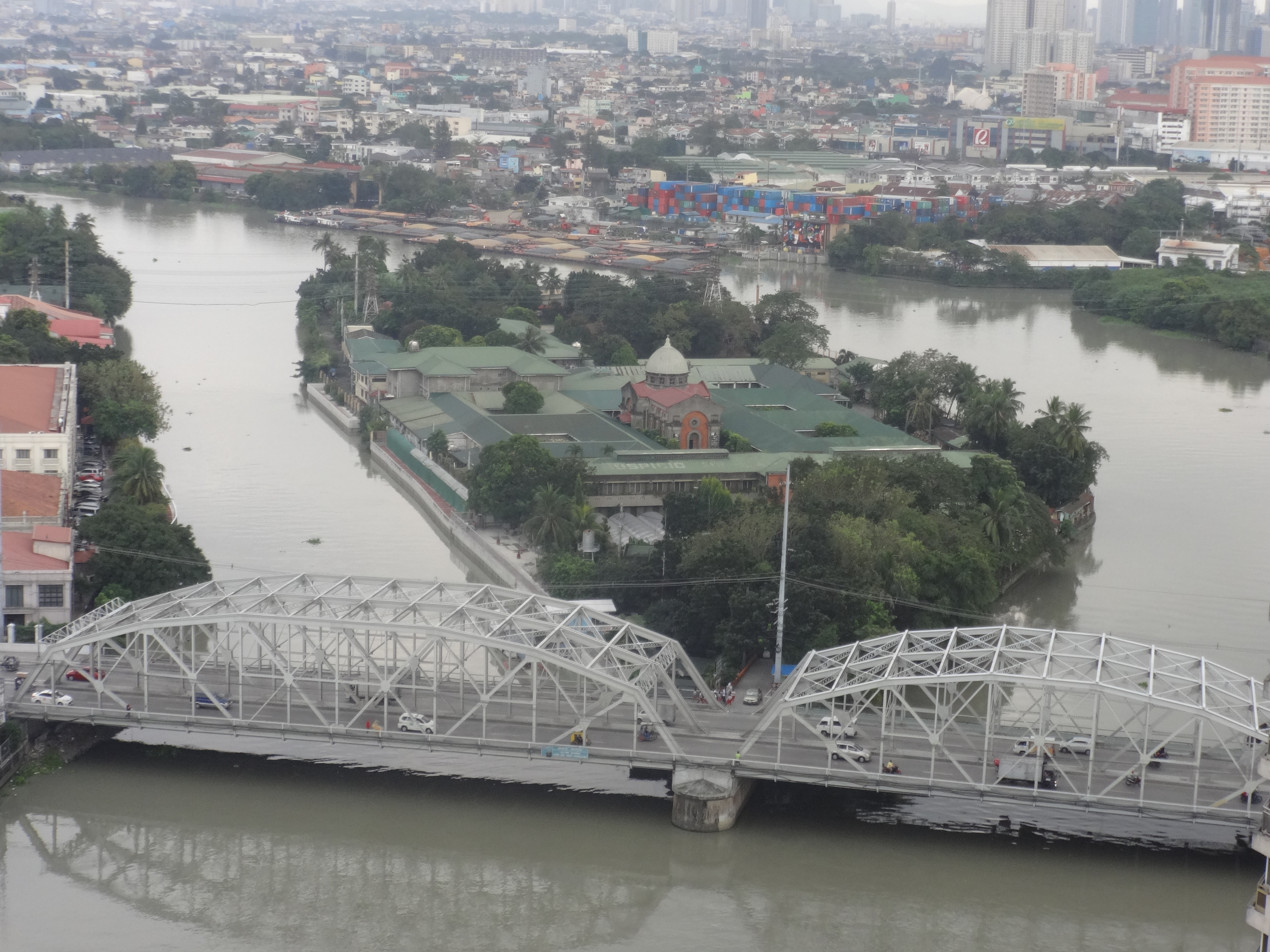
The facility is situated in Isla de Convalecencia.

Hospicio de San José is located on Isla de Convalecencia (Spanish, "Island of convalescence"), an eyot in the middle of the Pasig River, and can only be accessed via Ayala Bridge. It was formerly located in the Pandacan district. From there, it was transferred to Intramuros, Binondo, Nagtahan, and Echague. In 1810, the Hospicio was permanently relocated to Isla de Convalecencia.

== History ==
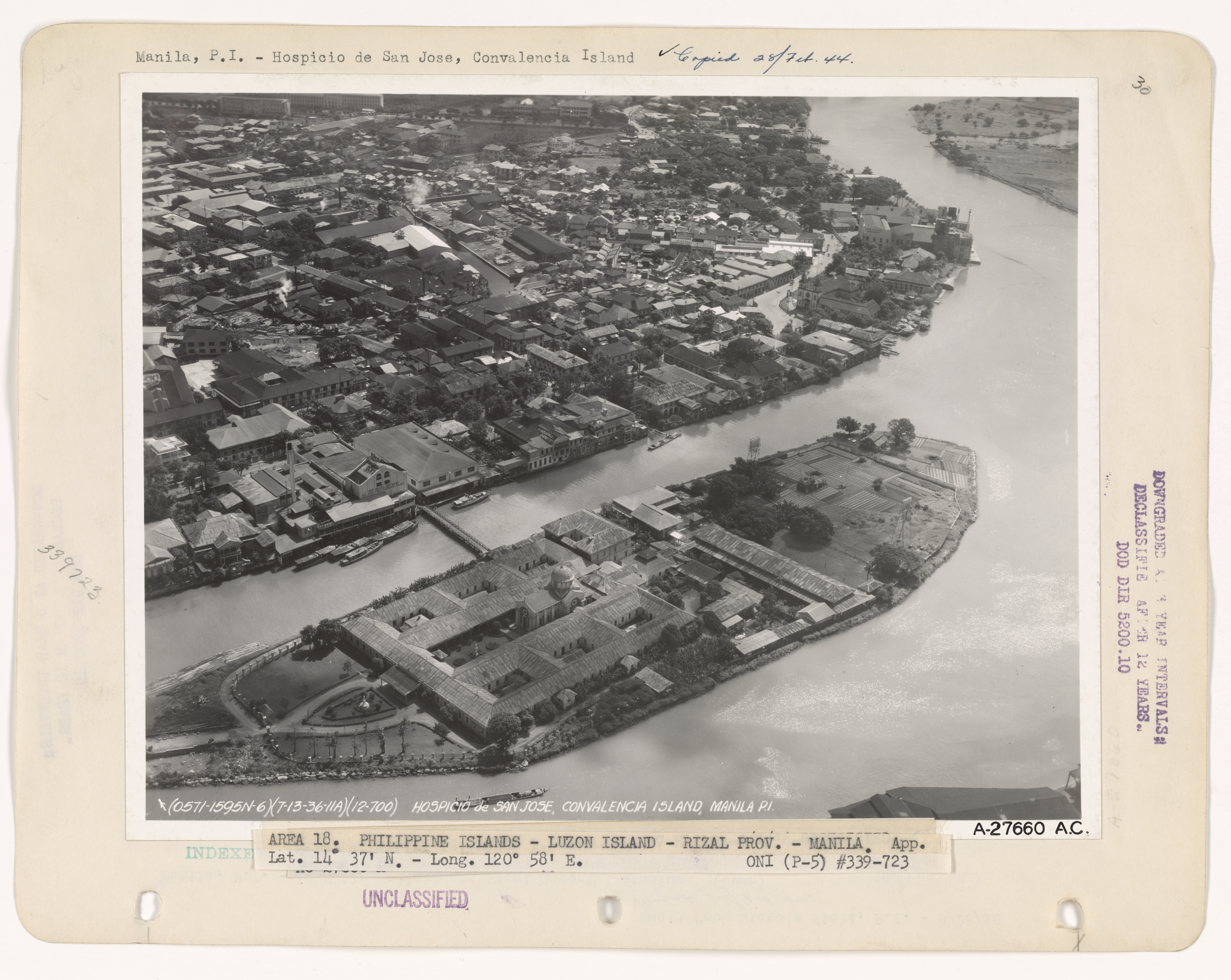
Aerial view of Hospicio de San Jose on Isla de Convalecencia, circa pre-1944

Initially named the Hospicio General (General Hospice), Hospicio de San José was established during the Spanish Era in October 1778 by Francisco Gómez Enríquez and his wife Barbara Verzosa. After being cured of a fever, Gómez Enríquez donated the sum of ₱ 4,000 to found the hospice that would take care of Manila’s “poor and unwanted children”, the physically and mentally disabled, and aging people. The initiative and example of Gómez Enríquez was followed by other charitable people of Manila.

== Administrators ==
From December 27, 1810, and by Royal Decree, the hospice was governed by a Board of Directors chaired by the Archbishop of Manila. On June 1, 1866, through the suggestion to the Governor-General of the Philippines by a benefactor named Doña Margarita Róxas de Ayala, the operation of the hospice became the responsibility of the Daughters of Charity of St. Vincent de Paul.

== Curriculum and programmes ==
The hospice provides an outreach programme and a Christian, social and work-oriented formation programme. It is committed to assisting abandoned people to experience quality life with the aim of making them “agents of social transformation”.

== Commemorative markers ==
The Hospicio de San José has two historical markers. The first, in English, was from the Historical Research and Markers Committee and was unveiled on October 17, 1939. In 1977, a second historical marker in Tagalog was given by the National Historical Institute.

=== 1939 Marker ===
The first historical marker of Hospicio de San José was installed on October 17, 1939, at Ayala Boulevard, San Miguel, Manila. It was installed by Historical Research and Markers Committee.

Hospicio de San Jose
FRANCISCO GOMEZ ENRIQUEZ AND HIS WIFE, BARBARA VERSOZA, FOUNDED THIS INSTITUTION IN 1782 FOR THE POOR AND FEEBLE-MINDED. A LIST OF ITS PATRONS IN THE ENTRANCE HALL INCLUDES THE NAMES OF SOME OF THE MOST NOBLE FAMILIES IN MANILA. THE INSTITUTION CARES FOR THE NEEDY, FROM FOUNDLINGS TO THE MOST AGED AND HELPLESS, AND GIVEN CHILDREN PRACTICAL AND RELIGIOUS EDUCATION. ORIGINALLY LOCATED IN PANDACAN, IT WAS FIRST MOVED TO INTRAMUROS AND THEN TO BINONDO; THENCE TO THIS ISLET IN 1835–1840. THE SISTERS OF CHARITY HAVE BEEN ADMINISTERING IT SINCE 1865; ITS FOUNDLING ASYLUM DATES FROM 1903; FROM 1905 TO 1917 THE PHILIPPINE GOVERNMENT SENT JUVENILE DELINQUENTS TO THIS INSTITUTION.

=== 1977 Marker ===
The second historical marker was installed in 1977 at Hospicio de San José, San Miguel, Manila. It was installed by National Historical Institute.

Hospicio de San Jose
ITINATAG NOONG 1782 NG MAG-ASAWANG FRANCISCO GOMEZ ENRIQUEZ PARA SA MAHIHIRAP AT MAHIHINA ANG ISIP. MULA SA PANDAKAN AY INILIPAT SA INTRAMUROS, PAGKATAPOS AY SA BINONDO, AT KATAPUSTAPUSA'Y SA MUNTING PULONG ITO NOON 1835–40. ANG INSTITUSYONG ITO AY KUMAKALINGA SA MAHIHIRAP AT SA WALANG MAG-ARUGA. ANG PAGKALINGA SA MGA SANGGOL SINIMULAN NOON 1905. MULA NOONG 1905 HANGANG 1917, ANG MGA BATANG MAY PAGKAKASALANG NAGAWA AY IPINADALA DITO NG PAMAHALAAN. MULA NOONG 1865, ANG MGA SISTERS OF CHARITY AY SIYA NANG NAMAMAHALA SA INSTITUSYONG ITO.

== See also ==
- Asilo de San Vicente de Paul
