= Pasig River =

Estuary in Metro Manila, Philippines

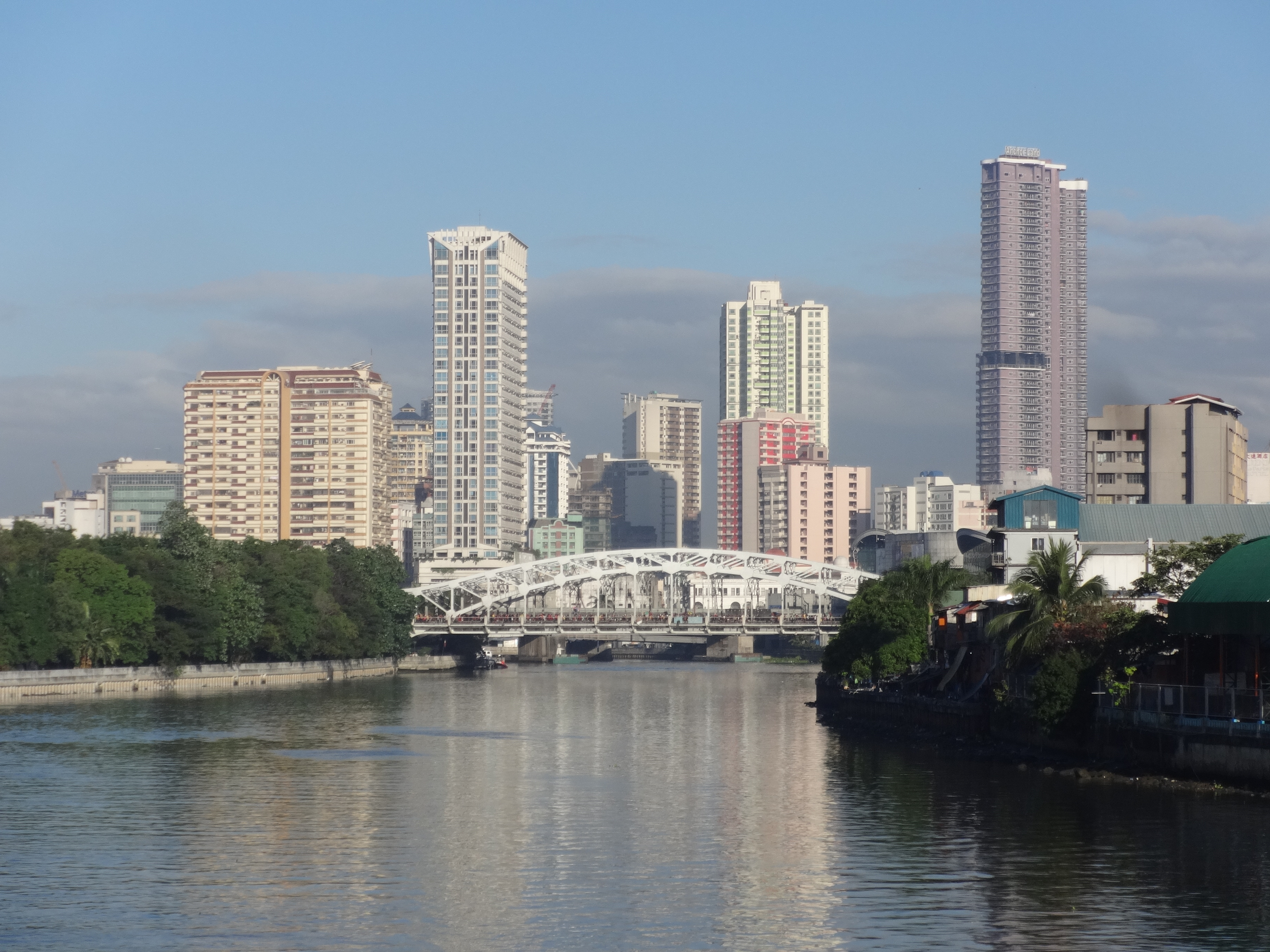
- Pasig River in Manila in 2019

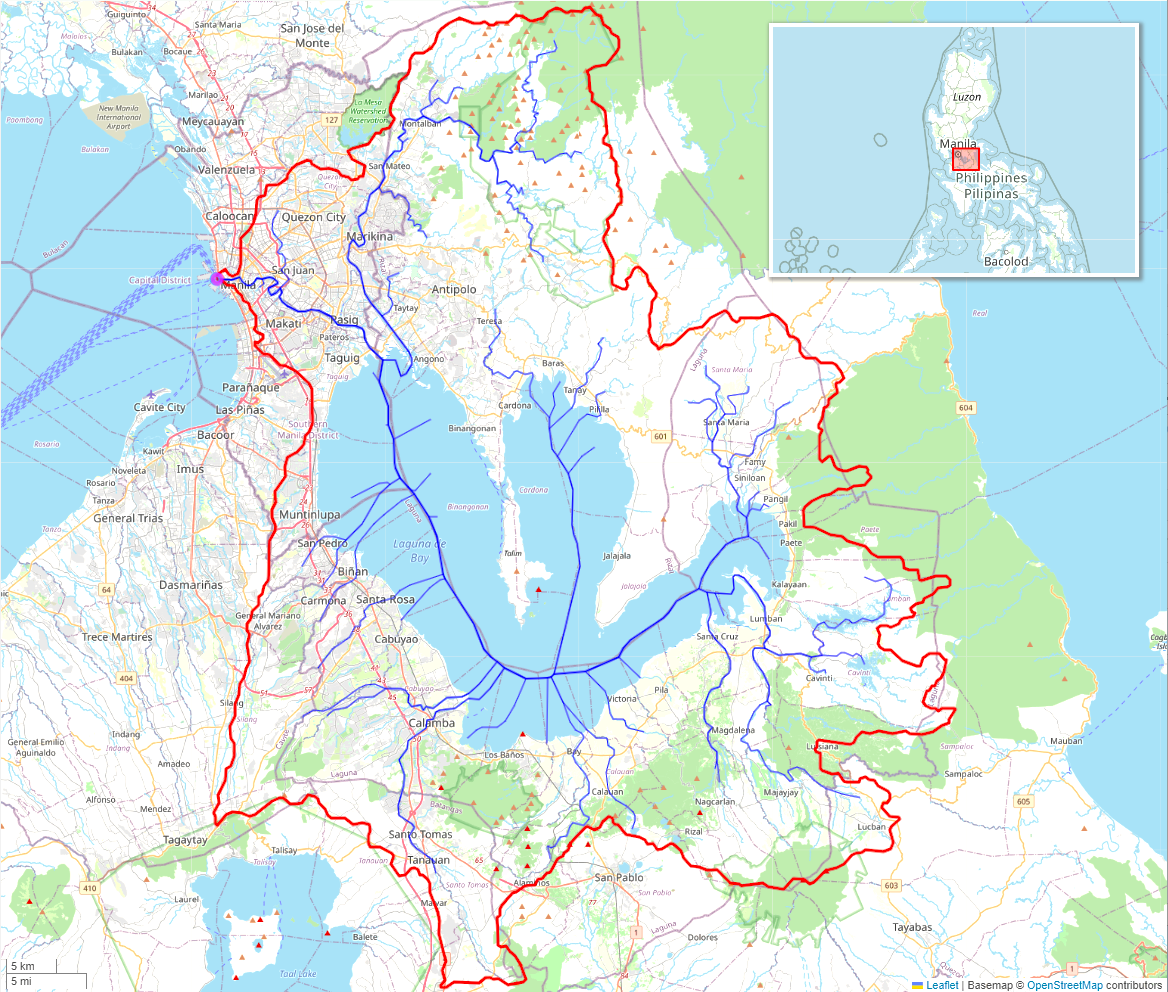
- Drainage basin map of the Pasig River

- Pasig River mouth Pasig River (Philippines)
- Native name: Ilog Pasig (Tagalog)

Location
- Country: Philippines
- Region: National Capital Region; Calabarzon
- Cities: Manila; Mandaluyong; Makati; Pasig; Taguig; Taytay, Rizal

Physical characteristics
- Source: Laguna de Bay
  - location: Taguig/Taytay, Rizal
  - coordinates: 14°31′33″N 121°06′33″E
- Mouth: Manila Bay
  - location: Manila
  - coordinates: 14°35′40″N 120°57′20″E
  - elevation: 0 m (0 ft)
- Length: 25.2 km (15.7 mi)
- Basin size: 4,678 km^{2} (1,806 sq mi)
- Width
  - average: 90 m (300 ft)
- Depth
  - minimum: 0.5 m (1.6 ft)
  - maximum: 5.5 m (18 ft)
- Discharge
  - minimum: 12 m^{3}/s (420 cu ft/s)
  - maximum: 275 m^{3}/s (9,700 cu ft/s)

Basin features
- Tributaries
  - left: Estero de Provisor; Estero de Tanque; Estero de Pandacan; Pateros River
  - right: Estero de Binondo; Estero dela Reina; Estero de Uli-Uli; Estero de San Miguel; Estero de Paco; San Juan River; Balisahan Creek; Marikina River; Napindan River
- Bridges: 20

The Pasig River (Filipino: Ilog Pasig; Spanish: Río Pásig) is a water body in the Philippines that connects Laguna de Bay to Manila Bay. Stretching for 25.2 kilometers (15.7 mi), it bisects the Philippine capital of Manila and its surrounding urban area into northern and southern halves. Its major tributaries are the Marikina River and San Juan River. The total drainage basin of the Pasig River, including the basin of Laguna de Bay, covers 4,678 square kilometers (1,806 sq mi).

The Pasig River is technically a tidal estuary, as the flow direction depends upon the water level difference between Manila Bay and Laguna de Bay. During the dry season, the water level in Laguna de Bay is low with the river's flow direction dependent on the tides. During the wet season, when the water level of Laguna de Bay is high, the flow is reversed towards Manila Bay.

The Pasig River used to be an important transport route and source of water for Spanish Manila. Due to negligence and industrial development, the river suffered a rapid decline in the second half of the 20th century and was declared biologically dead in 1990. Two decades after that declaration, however, a renaturation program designed to revive the river has seen the return of life to the river, including eight fish species, 39 species of birds, and 118 species of trees and other vegetation. As a result, the Pasig River received the Asia Riverprize by the International River Foundation in 2019.

The Pasig River Rehabilitation Commission (PRRC) was a Philippine government agency established to oversee rehabilitation efforts for the river from 1999 until it was abolished in November 2019. Rehabilitation efforts are also aided by private sector organizations through raising funds or assisting river cleanups.

== Etymology ==
The river takes its name from the city of Pasig, which is named after the Tagalog word pasig, meaning "a river that flows into the sea" or "the sandy bank of a river", with the former in reference to the Pasig River's flow from Laguna de Bay towards Manila Bay and out into the South China Sea.

== History ==
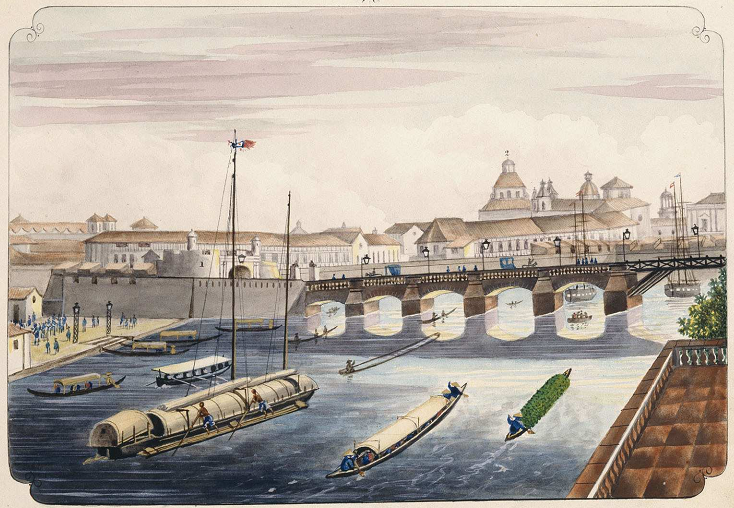
1847 painting by José Honorato Lozano showing a casco barge and sampans traversing the Puente de España bridge (replaced by the Jones Bridge)

The Pasig River served as an important means of transport; it was Manila's lifeline and center of economic activity. Some of the most prominent kingdoms in early Philippine history, including the kingdoms of Namayan, Maynila, and Tondo grew up along the banks of the river, drawing their life and source of wealth from it. When the Spanish established Manila as the capital of their colonial properties in the Far East, they built the walled city of Intramuros on the southern bank of the Pasig River near its mouth.

=== Pollution ===
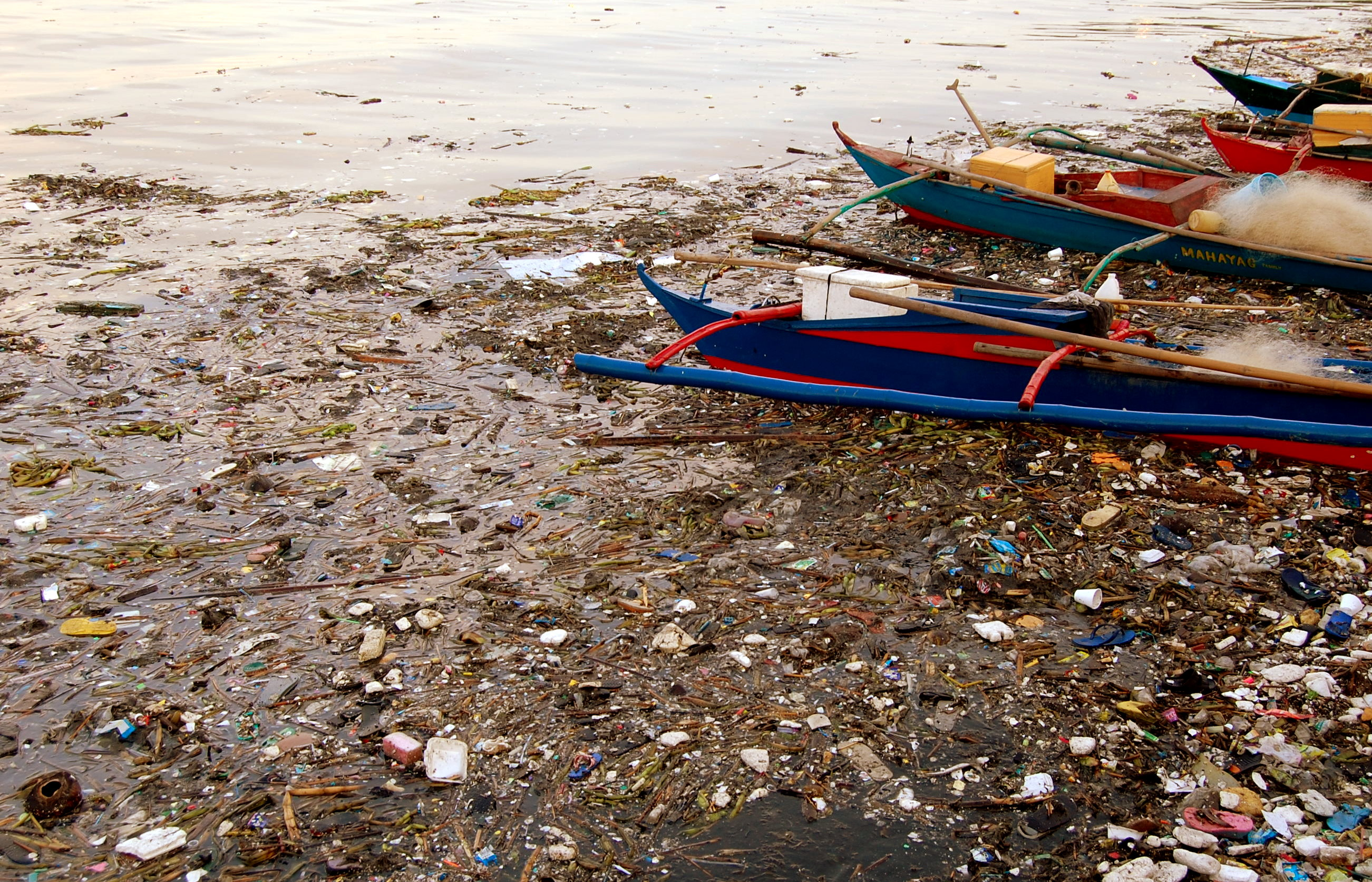
Pollution in Manila Bay in 2008. Manila Bay is the catchment area of the Pasig and Pampanga River Basins.

The Pasig River in the Philippines suffers from a high level of water pollution and efforts are being made to rehabilitate it.

After World War II, massive population growth, infrastructure construction, and the dispersal of economic activities to Manila's suburbs left the river neglected. The banks of the river attracted informal settlers and the remaining factories dumped their wastes into the river, making it effectively a huge sewer system. Industrialization had already polluted the river.

In the 1930s, observers noticed the increasing pollution of the river, as fish migration from Laguna de Bay diminished. People ceased using the river's water for laundering in the 1960s, and ferry transport declined. By the 1970s, the river started to emanate offensive smells as a result of waste from swine and poultry establishments in the area where protected Marikina watershed is located (Pinugay, Baras, Rizal) and in the 1980s, fishing in the river was prohibited. By 1990, the Pasig River was considered biologically dead.

It is estimated that about 60-65 percent of the pollution in the Pasig River comes from household waste disposed into the tributaries of the river. Increasing poverty in the rural areas in Philippines has driven migration to Metro Manila in search of better opportunities. This resulted in rapid urban growth, congestion and overcrowding of land and along the riverbanks, making the river and its tributaries a dumping ground for informal settlers living there. About 30–35 percent of the river pollution is generated from industries located close to the river (such as tanneries, textile mills, food processing plants, distilleries, and chemical and metal plants), some of which do not have water treatment facilities capable of removing heavy metal pollutants. The rest of the pollutants consist of solid waste dumped into the rivers. Metro Manila has been reported to produce as much as 7,000 metric tons (6,900 long tons; 7,700 short tons) of garbage per day. A study conducted by researchers from the Polytechnic University of the Philippines found that the river is also contaminated with microplastics. It is also the world's single largest source of marine plastic pollution, being responsible for 6.43% of global marine plastic pollution.

In 2017, a study on river plastic emissions into the world's oceans cited the Pasig River as the world's eighth most polluting river in terms of unwanted micro and surface concentrations of plastic waste entering the marine environment.

In 2021, a research by the American Association for the Advancement of Science on the world's rivers ranked the Pasig River as the largest contributor of plastic waste to the world's oceans, additionally claiming that 28% of the rivers causing plastic pollution globally are in the Philippines.

==== Rehabilitation efforts ====
Efforts to revive the river began in December 1989 with the help of Danish authorities. The Pasig River Rehabilitation Program (PRRP) was established, with the Department of Environment and Natural Resources (DENR) as the main agency with the coordination of the Danish International Development Assistance (DANIDA).

In 1994, First Lady Amelita M. Ramos founded the Clean & Green Foundation Inc., a non-government and non-profit organization. The organization conducted fundraising projects such as the Piso para sa Pasig (Filipino: "A peso for the Pasig") campaign. The campaign raised around PHP52 million.

In 1999, President Joseph Estrada signed Executive Order No. 54 establishing the Pasig River Rehabilitation Commission (PRRC) to replace the old PRRP with additional expanded powers such as managing of wastes and resettling of squatters. The PRRC was abolished in November 2019, with its functions and powers being transferred to the Manila Bay Task Force, DENR, Department of Housing and Urban Development, Metropolitan Manila Development Authority (MMDA), and the Department of Public Works and Highways (DPWH).

In 2010, the television network ABS-CBN and PRRC headed by ABS-CBN Foundation-Bantay Kalikasan Director Gina Lopez – then chairperson of PRRC – launched a fun run fund-raising activity called "Run for the Pasig River" held every October from 2009 to 2013. The proceeds from the fun run will serve as a fund for the "Kapit-bisig para sa Ilog Pasig" (Collaborate for the Pasig River) rehabilitation project of the Pasig River. No further fun run has been announced since the 2013 event.

In October 2018, the PRRC won the first Asia Riverprize, in recognition of its efforts to rehabilitate the Pasig River. According to the PRRC, aquatic life has returned to the river.

On April 20, 2021, San Miguel Corporation announced that it would initiate a clean-up of the Pasig River in May 2021. SMC will also work with the DENR and the DPWH in this river cleanup. The river cleanup is part of San Miguel Corporation's ₱95 billion Pasig River Expressway project.

===== Pasig River Esplanade =====
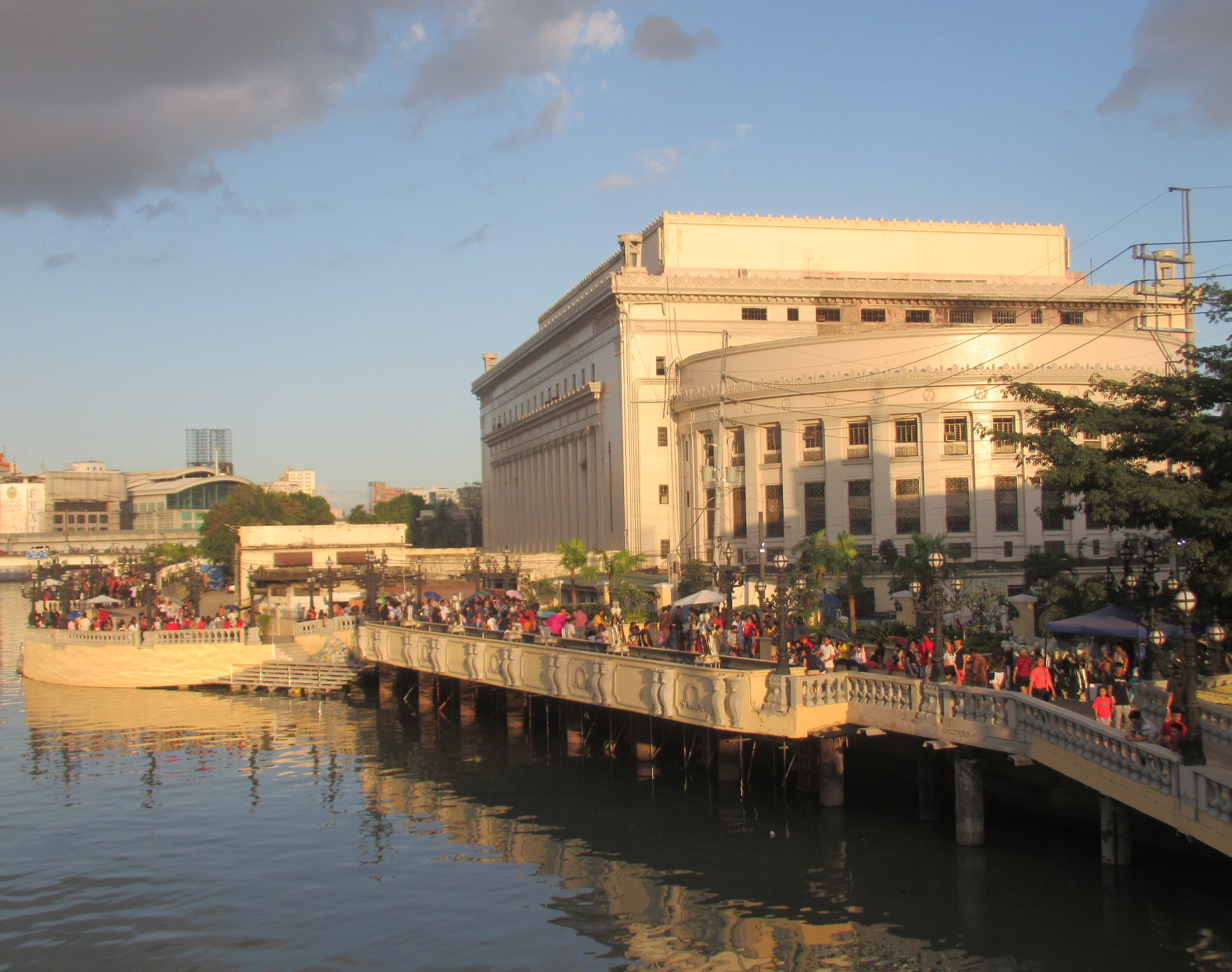
Pasig River Esplanade Phase 2

On January 17, 2024, the Bongbong Marcos administration inaugurated its Pasig Bigyang Buhay Muli (PBBM; lit. 'Give Life to Pasig Again') project, aiming to revitalize the Pasig River through the development of linear parks, walkways, bikeways, and commercial developments. The program also aims to improve the existing Pasig River Ferry System through the addition of more ferry boats and stations.

President Marcos inaugurated on January 17, 2024, the Pasig River Esplanade, the first phase of the P18-billion Pasig River Urban Development of the Rehabilitation of the Pasig River. The Inter-Agency Council for the Pasig River Urban Development (IAC-PRUD) per Jose Acuzar announced that it will build 8 more esplanades in other parts of the 25-kilometer river. The 500-metre (1,600 ft) embankment behind the Manila Central Post Office features the promenade which will be 25 kilometres (16 mi) long on each side of the Pasig River. Acuzar further said that the promenade would lead to a 150-hectare (370-acre) park in Rizal that may be called "Marcos Park".

==== Invasive species ====
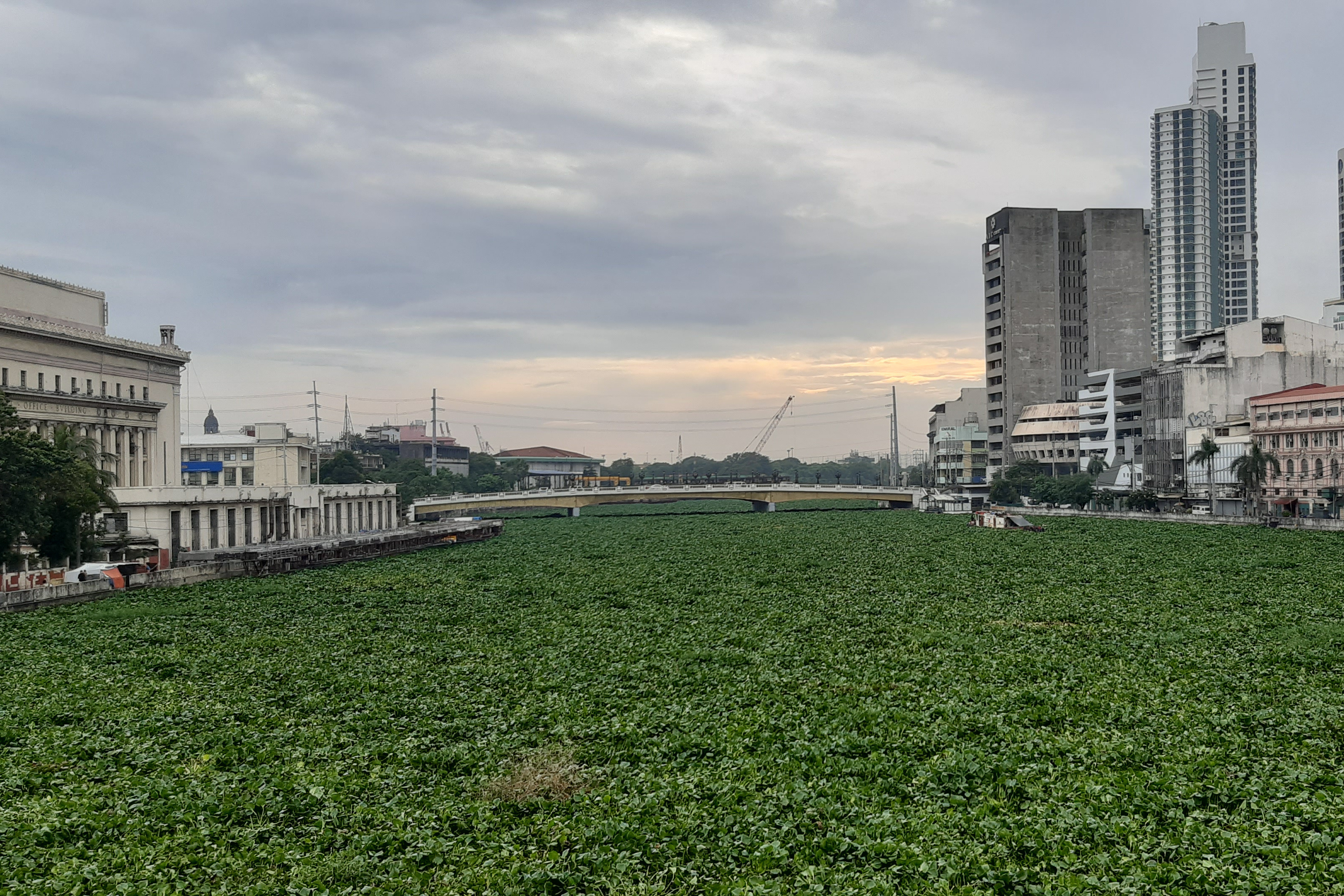
Water hyacinths cover the Pasig River near MacArthur Bridge in Manila in October 2020.

The Pasig River has been infested with invasive species, notably the water hyacinth and the janitor fish. Water hyacinth, introduced in the Philippines around 1912 as an ornamental plant, has been thrown into the Pasig River; this led the profusely-growing plants to thrive in the river as well as Laguna de Bay due to shifting tides. The plants are currently considered a notorious pest as they clog the waterways. Introduced in the 1990s to clean algae, the janitor fish has become one of the most destructive fishes. Aside from preying on small fish and contributing to the river's murkiness, its population has exponentially risen due to lack of natural predators.

=== Memorial ===
In December 2024, as memorial to Pasig River, the Philippine Postal Corporation launched at Bonifacio Shrine, Gelo Andres and Renacimiento Manila's work, the P150 "Simbang Gabi sa Ilog Pasig”. The longest usable stamp measures 234mm x 40mm. The postage stamp design features 9 historical churches from Binondo to Antipolo along the river.

== Geography ==
The Pasig River winds generally northwestward for some 25 kilometers (15.5 mi) from Laguna de Bay, the largest lake in the Philippines, to Manila Bay, in the southern part of the island of Luzon. From the lake, the river runs between Taguig and Taytay, Rizal, before entering Pasig. This portion of the Pasig River, to the confluence with the Marikina River tributary, is known as the Napindan River or Napindan Channel.

From there, the Pasig forms flows through Pasig until its confluence with the Taguig River. From here, it forms the border between Mandaluyong to the north and Makati to the south. The river then sharply turns northeast, where it becomes the border between Mandaluyong and Manila before turning again westward, joining its other major tributary, the San Juan River, and then following a sinuous path through the center of Manila before emptying into Manila Bay.

The whole river and most portions of its tributaries lie entirely within Metro Manila, the metropolitan region of the capital. Isla de Convalecencia, the only island dividing the Pasig River, can be found in Manila and is where the Hospicio de San Jose is located.

=== Tributaries and canals ===
One major river that drains Laguna de Bay is the Taguig River, which enters into Taguig before becoming the Pateros River; it is the border between the municipalities of Pateros and Makati. The Pateros River then enters the confluence where the Napindan Channel and Marikina River meet. The Marikina River is the larger of the two major tributaries of the Pasig River, and it flows southward from the mountains of Rizal and cuts through the Marikina Valley. The San Juan River drains the plateau on which Quezon City stands; its major tributary is Diliman Creek.

Within the city of Manila, various esteros (canals) criss-cross through the city and connect with the Tullahan River in the north and the Parañaque River to the west.

=== Crossings ===
Locations of the bridges within Metro Manila that span the Pasig

A total of 20 bridges currently cross the Pasig. The first bridge from the source at Laguna de Bay is the Napindan Bridge, followed by the Arsenio Jimenez Bridge to its west. Crossing the Napindan Channel in Pasig is the Bambang Bridge. It is followed by the Kaunlaran Bridge that connects barangays Buting and Sumilang in Pasig.

The next bridge downstream is the C.P. Garcia Bridge carrying C-5 Road and connecting the cities of Makati and Pasig. It is followed by the Sta. Monica–Lawton Bridge, the newest bridge opened in June 2021 that connects Lawton Avenue in Makati to Fairlane Street in Pineda, Pasig as part of the Bonifacio Global City–Ortigas Link Road project approved in 2015.

The Guadalupe Bridge between Makati and Mandaluyong carries Epifanio de los Santos Avenue, the major artery of Metro Manila, as well as the MRT Line 3 from Guadalupe station to Boni station. The Estrella–Pantaleon and Makati–Mandaluyong Bridges likewise connect the two cities downstream, with the latter forming the end of Makati Avenue.

The easternmost crossing in Manila is Lambingan Bridge in the district of Santa Ana. It is then followed by the Tulay Pangarap Footbridge (Abante Bridge), the newest pedestrian bridge that connects the Punta area and Santa Ana proper. It is followed by the Abante Bridge (Tulay Pangarap Footbridge) in Santa Ana, Skyway Stage 3, and the Padre Zamora (Pandacan) Bridge connecting Pandacan and Santa Mesa districts, and carries the southern line of the Philippine National Railways. The expressway bridge of Skyway Stage 3, serving as a connection road between the North Luzon Expressway and the South Luzon Expressway, is built near the mouth of the San Juan River where most parts of it is built and another bridge parallel to Padre Zamora and PNR bridges will be built to merge with NLEX Connector in Santa Mesa; it will thus serve as a solution to heavy traffic along EDSA. The Mabini Bridge (formerly Nagtahan Bridge) provides a crossing for Nagtahan Street, part of C-2 Road. Ayala Bridge carries Ayala Boulevard, and connects the Isla de Convalecencia to both banks of the Pasig.

Further downstream are the Quezon Bridge from Quiapo to Ermita, the Line 1 bridge from Central Terminal station to Carriedo station, MacArthur Bridge from Santa Cruz to Ermita, and the Jones Bridge from Binondo to Ermita. The last bridge near the mouth of the Pasig is the Roxas Bridge (also known as M. Lopez Bridge and formerly called Del Pan Bridge) from San Nicolas to Port Area and Intramuros.

=== Landmarks ===
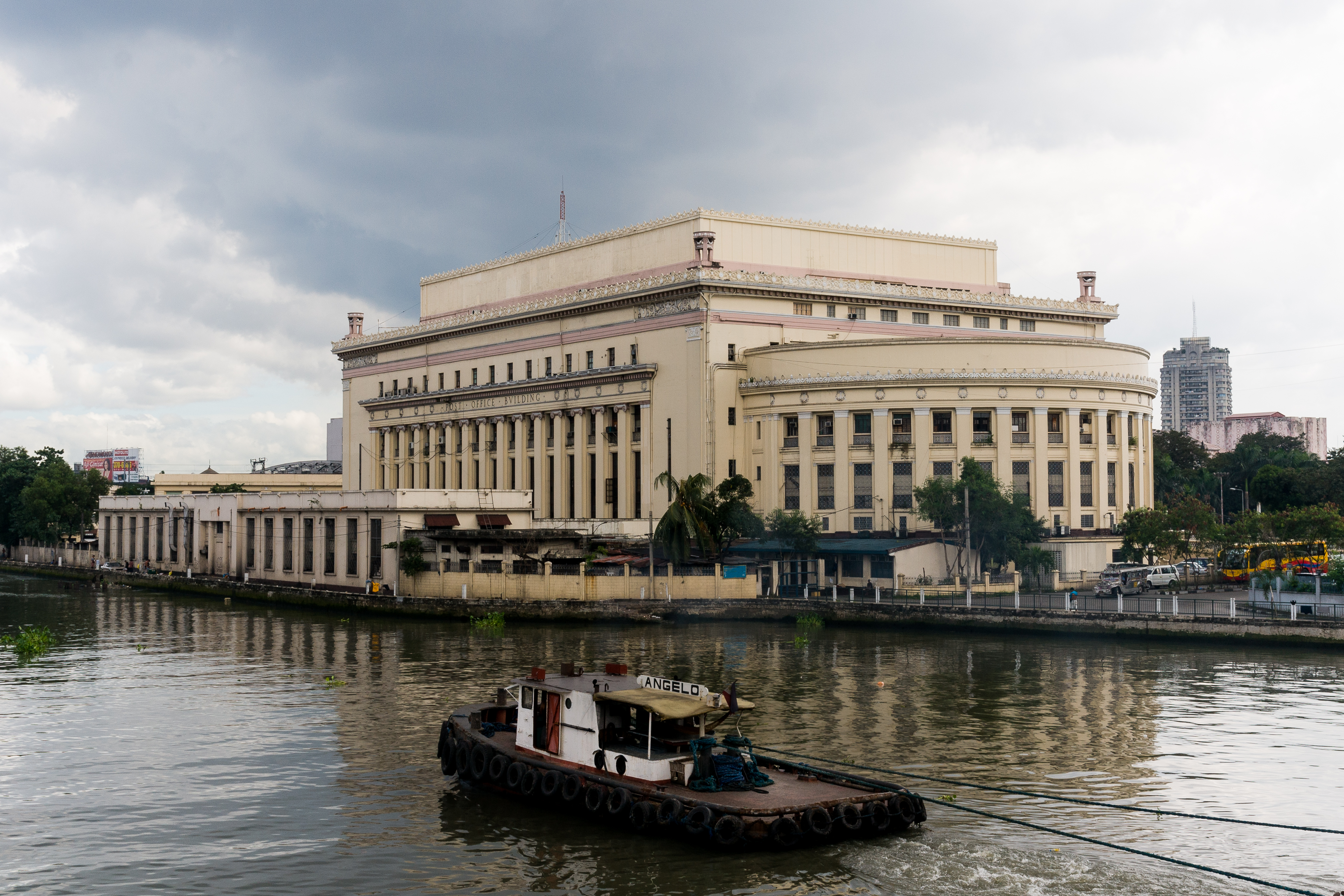
The Pasig River with the Old Post Office Building

The growth of Manila along the banks of the Pasig River has made it a focal point for development and historical events. The foremost landmark on the banks of the river is the walled district of Intramuros, located near the mouth of the river on its southern bank. It was built by the Spanish colonial government in the 16th century. Further upstream is the Hospicio de San Jose, an orphanage located on Pasig's sole island, the Isla de Convalescencia. On the northern bank stands the Quinta Market in Quiapo, Manila's central market, and Malacañan Palace, the official residence of the President of the Philippines. Also on the Pasig River's northern bank and within the Manila district of Sta. Mesa is the main campus of the Polytechnic University of the Philippines.

In Makati, along the southern bank of Pasig, are Circuit Makati (the former Santa Ana Race Track), the Poblacion sewage treatment plant and pumping station of Manila Water, and the Rockwell Center, a high-end office and commercial area. At the confluence of the Pasig and Marikina rivers is the Napindan Hydraulic Control Structure, which regulates the flow of water from the Napindan Channel.

==== Geographical landmarks ====
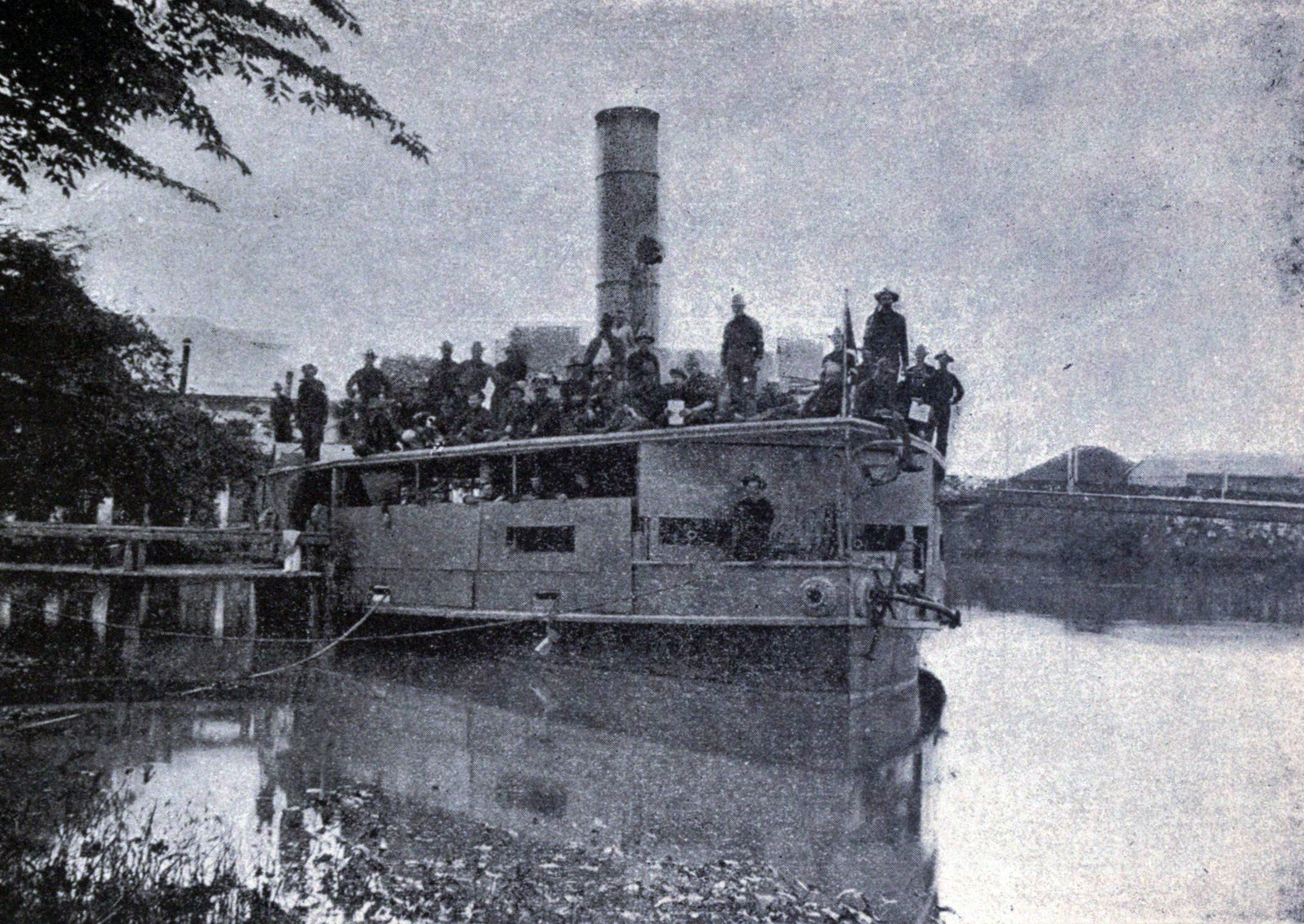
The Laguna de Bay was a Pasig River steamer operated by a Spanish company and was a type of vessel immortalized in José Rizal's novels. It is shown here after its conversion into an American gunboat. The modification of civilian vessels for war by fitting artillery pieces had previously been practiced by the Philippine and Spanish navies. The modern counterparts of the Pasig steamers are the Pasig water buses.

The third chapter of Jose Rizal's novel El filibusterismo mentions several stories surrounding certain geographical features along the Pasig River during the Spanish colonial era, such as the Buwayang Bato, the Malapad na Bato, and Doña Geromina's Cave.

Doña Geromina's Cave, according to legend, was built by the Archbishop of Manila as a sanctuary for his former lover. The cave is believed to be located in Barangay Pineda, Pasig under the Bagong Ilog Bridge, which carries Circumferential Road 5 between Pasig and Taguig.

===== Malapad na Bato =====
In what is now Barangay West Rembo, Taguig, a cliff along the river is known as Malapad-na-bato (lit. '"Wide-rock"'), which was considered to be sacred to the early Tagalog people as a home to spirits. After the Nuestra Señora de Gracia Church was completed in 1630, it eventually became a pilgrimage site for newly converted Christians, resulting in a decline in the importance of Malapad-na-bató as a religious site. It was mentioned in El Filibusterismo that the sacred character of the site disappeared as fears of the spirits living there had disappeared after the cliff was inhabited by bandits.

===== Buwayang Bato =====
The Buwayang Bato (lit. '"crocodile rock"') was a rock formation that allegedly resembled a large crocodile. In El Filibusterismo, the legend tells a story of a rich Chinese man who did not believe in Catholicism that boasted of not being afraid of crocodiles. One day, while trading on the river, the man was attacked by a large crocodile. It was said that after the Chinese man prayed to San Nicholas for mercy, the crocodile turned into stone. The rock formation is believed to have been located at the southeastern shore of Mandaluyong, in the namesake barangay of Buayang Bato. Other rock formations in the country that resemble crocodiles can be found near Boracay, and Santa Ana, Cagayan.

== Geology ==
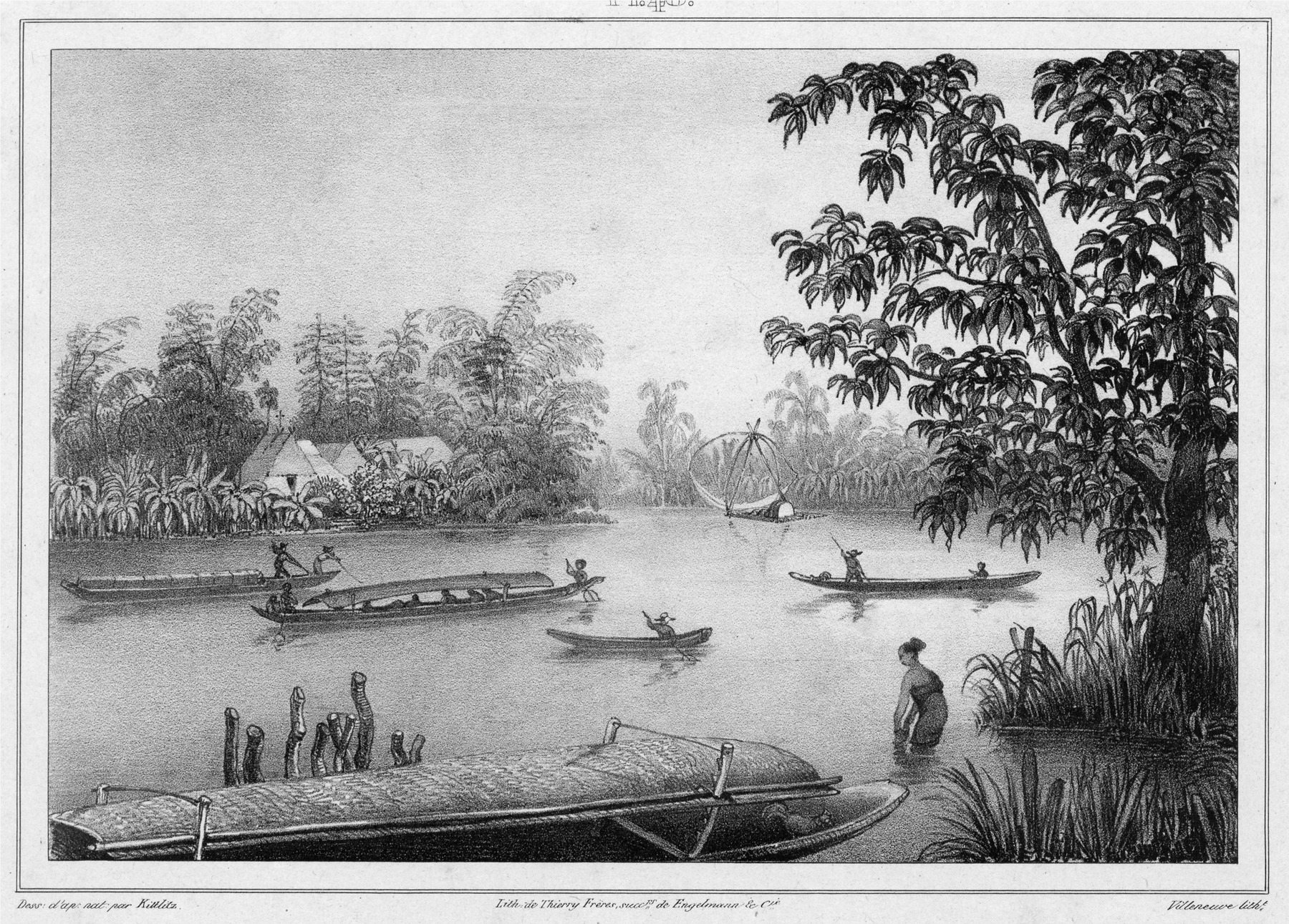
View of the Pasig River in 1826–1829

The Pasig River's main watershed is concentrated in the plains between Manila Bay and Laguna de Bay. The watershed of the Marikina River tributary mostly occupies the Marikina Valley, which was formed by the Marikina Fault Line. The Manggahan Floodway is an artificially constructed waterway that aims to reduce the flooding in the Marikina Valley during the rainy season, by bringing excess water to Laguna de Bay.

=== Tidal flows ===
The Pasig River is technically considered a tidal estuary. Toward the end of the summer or dry season (April and May), the water level in Laguna de Bay reaches to a minimum of 10.5 meters (34 ft). During times of high tide, the water level in the lake may drop below that of Manila Bay's, resulting in a reverse flow of seawater from the bay into the lake. This results in increased pollution and salinity levels in Laguna de Bay at this time of the year.

=== Flooding ===
The Pasig River is vulnerable to flooding in times of very heavy rainfall, with the Marikina River tributary the main source of the floodwater. The Manggahan Floodway was constructed to divert excess floodwater from the Marikina River into Laguna de Bay, which serves as a temporary reservoir. By design, the Manggahan Floodway is capable of handling 2,400 cubic meters (85,000 cu ft) per second of water flow, with the actual flow being about 2,000 cubic meters (71,000 cu ft) per second. To complement the floodway, the Napindan Hydraulic Control System (NHCS) was built in 1983 at the confluence of the Marikina River and the Napindan Channel to regulate the flow of water between the Pasig River and the lake.

=== Archaeology ===
A human cranium and mandible was described by D. Sánchez y Sánchez (1929) from under 2.1–3 m (6 ft 11 in – 9 ft 10 in) of Pasig River alluvium. It was discovered during construction of the Church of the Jesuits in 1921 and was partially damaged during excavation, and was noted to be 'primitive' through a loss of Neanderthal characters and mandibular traits (most notably in the teeth and lack of chin), coining the name Homo manillensis. Sánchez y Sánchez classified the species as pre-indigenous using outdated methods based on racial classification. The specimen remains undated (although a Quaternary age has been suggested), and Romeo (1979) somewhat equates the skull with Homo sapiens in his description. Sarat Chandra (1930) follows suite of Romeo (1979).

== Gallery ==
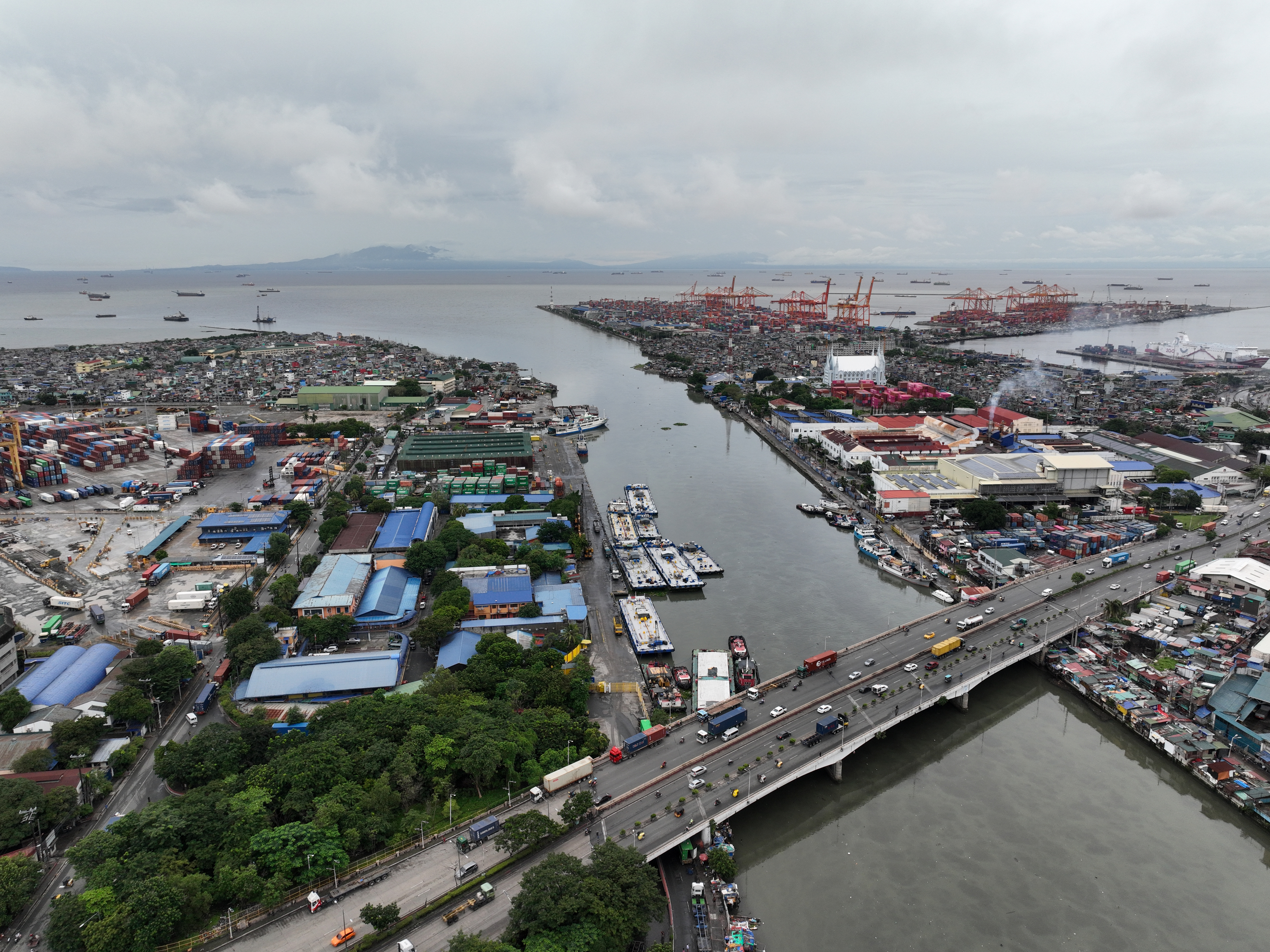
Mouth of the Pasig River at the Manila Bay

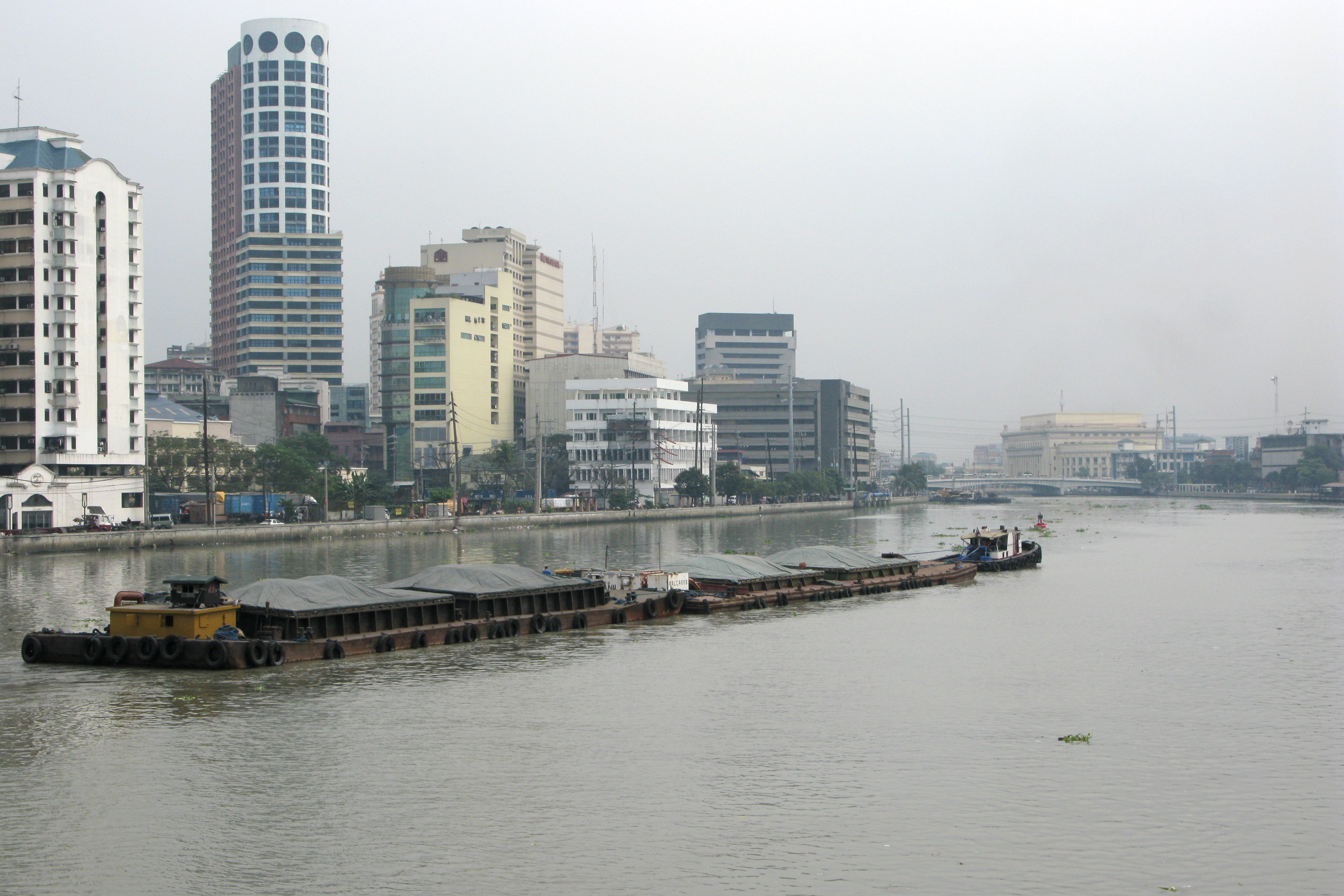
Barge on the Pasig River

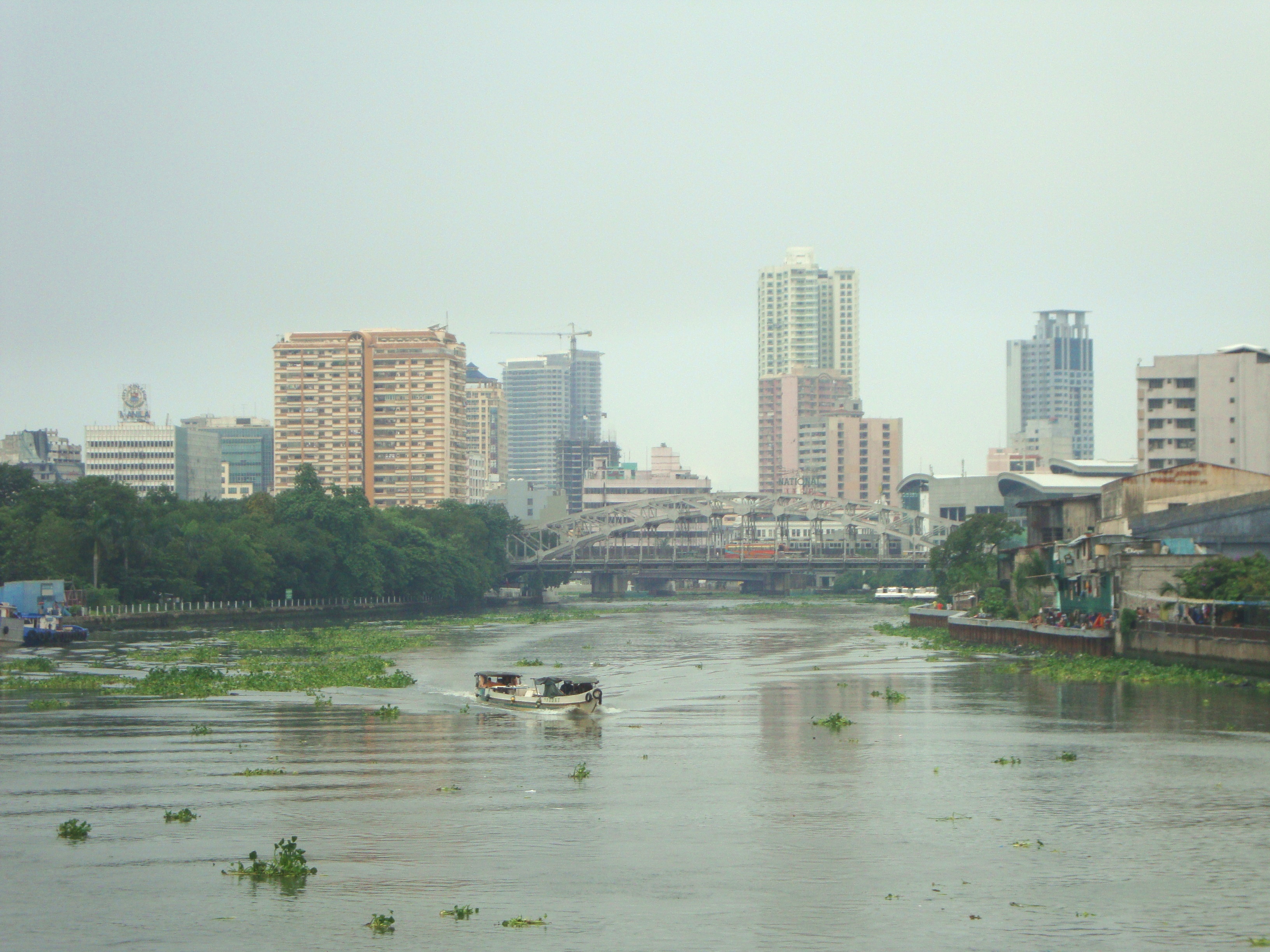
The Pasig River near Quiapo

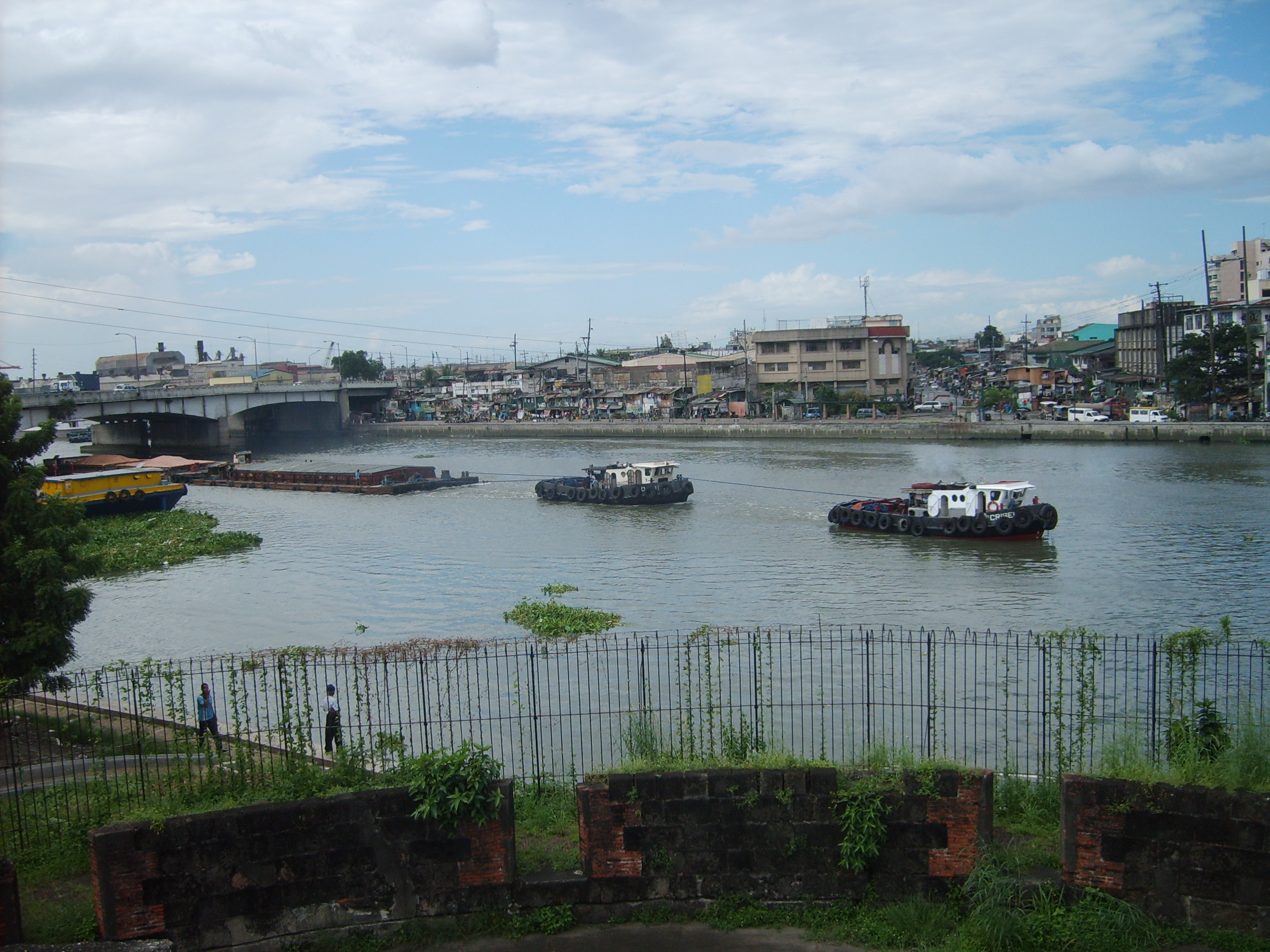
View from Fort Santiago

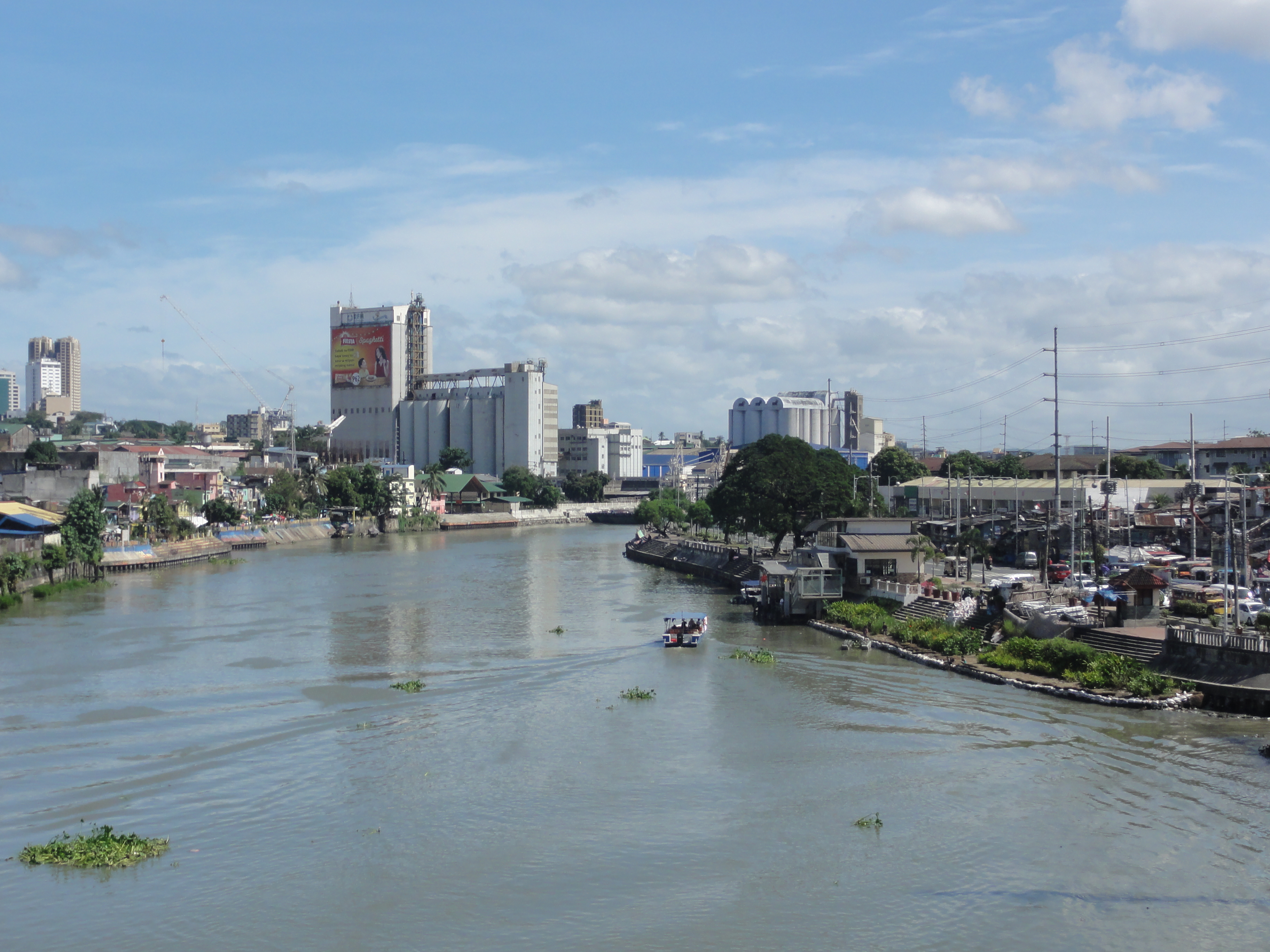
View from Guadalupe Bridge

== See also ==
- List of most-polluted rivers
- List of rivers and esteros in Manila
- 1968 Casiguran earthquake
- Laguna de Bay
- Manila Bay
- Marikina River
- Pasig River Ferry Service
