= Build! Build! Build! =

Infrastructure program in the Philippines

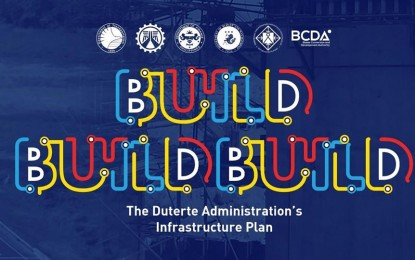
Build! Build! Build! logo

The Build! Build! Build! Infrastructure Program (BBB) was the infrastructure program of the administration of Rodrigo Duterte, the 16th president of the Philippines. A key component of his socioeconomic policy, the program aimed to reduce poverty, encourage economic growth and reduce congestion in Metro Manila, and address the country's infrastructure gap. Launched on April 18, 2017 and mainly implemented by the Department of Public Works and Highways (DPWH) under Secretary Mark Villar, the program also included the continuation of 44 infrastructure projects under previous administrations. By November 2021, DPWH Undersecretary Emil K. Sadain was appointed by Duterte as the program's "chief implementer" after Villar's resignation from the agency.

The Build! Build! Build! program was superseded by the Build Better More (BBM) infrastructure program of the administration of Duterte's successor, Bongbong Marcos. government officials have described the new program as an expansion of the BBB program.

== List of associated projects ==
In November 2019, the government revised its list of flagship infrastructure projects under the program, expanding it to 100. It was revised again in August 2020, bringing the total number of projects to 104, expanding its scope included health, information and communications technology, as well as water infrastructure projects to support the country's economic growth and recovery from the effects of the COVID-19 pandemic. As of September 11, 2020, 24 projects were still in the approval & planning stages, while 80 were under implementation.

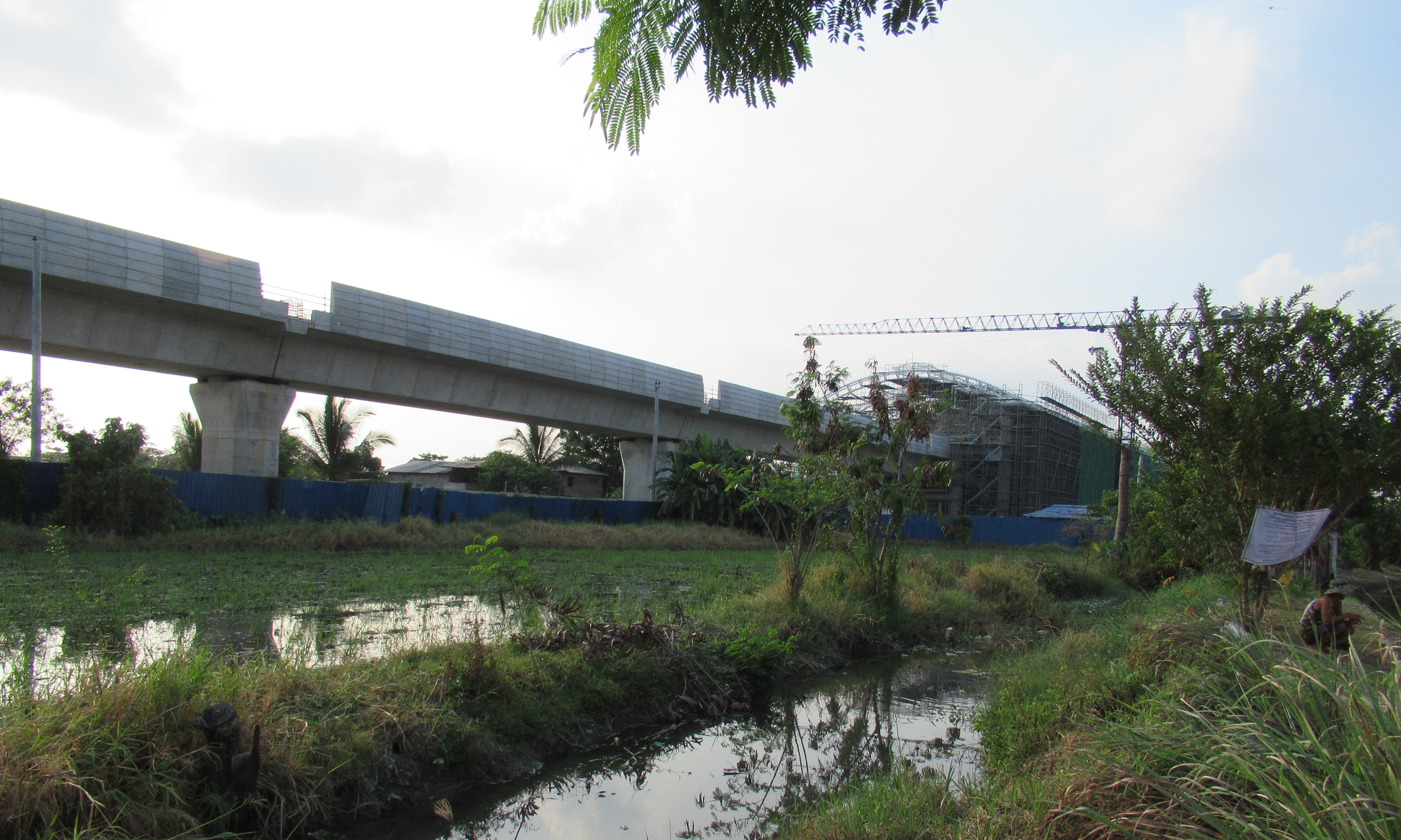
Construction of the North–South Commuter Railway in Balagtas, Bulacan

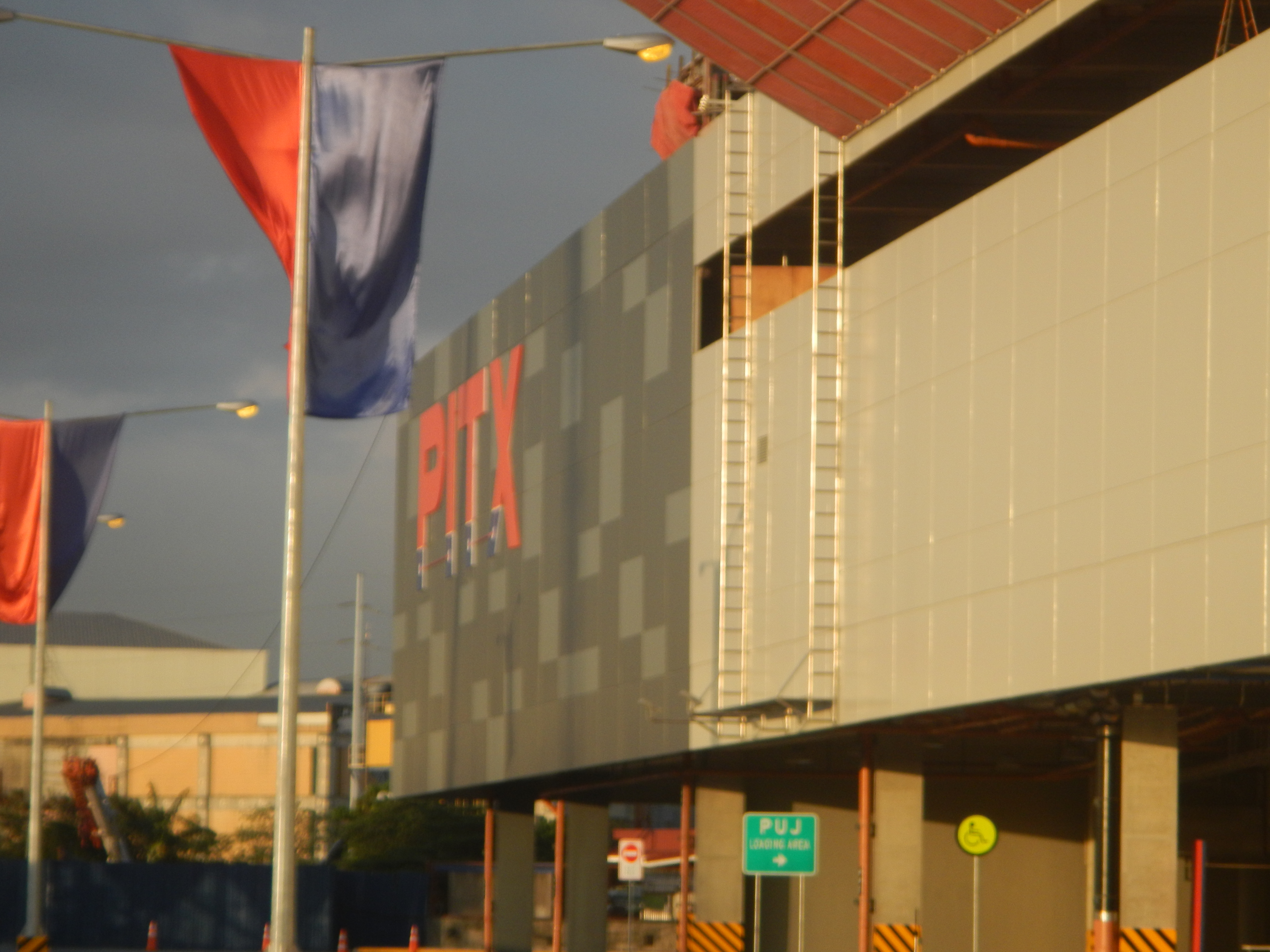
The Parañaque Integrated Terminal Exchange in Parañaque

=== Public transportation ===
Project	Construction	Status	Completion date	Ref.
Rail transportation
Cebu Monorail System		Proposed		
LRT Line 1 south extension	2019–2024	Completed	November 15, 2024	
LRT Line 2 east extension	2015–2021	Completed	July 5, 2021	
LRT Line 2 west extension		Proposed		
LRT Line 6		Proposed		
Metro Manila Subway (Phase 1)	2019–	Under-construction	2029-32	
Mindanao Railway Phase 1 (Tagum–Davao–Digos Segment)		Proposed		
MRT Line 3 rehabilitation	2019–2022	Completed	March 22, 2022	
MRT Line 4		Proposed		
MRT Line 7	2016–	Under-construction	2027	
MRT Line 10		Proposed		
MRT Line 11		Proposed		
North Triangle Common Station	2017–	Under-construction	2027	
Panay Railway		Proposed		
PNR North–South Commuter Railway (NSCR)	2019–	Under-construction	2027	
PNR South Long Haul (or PNR Bicol)		Proposed		
SkyTrain (Fort Bonifacio–Makati SkyTrain)		Proposed		
Subic–Clark Railway		Proposed		
Urban transportation
Cebu BRT System	2023–	Under-construction		
Davao Public Transport Modernization project		Ongoing		
EDSA Busway Concourse project	2021–2022	Under construction	2022	
Metro Manila BRT Line 1 (Quezon Avenue)		Proposed		
Parañaque Integrated Terminal Exchange	2015–2018	Completed	November 5, 2018	
Taguig Integrated Terminal Exchange	2018–2027	Under-construction	2027	

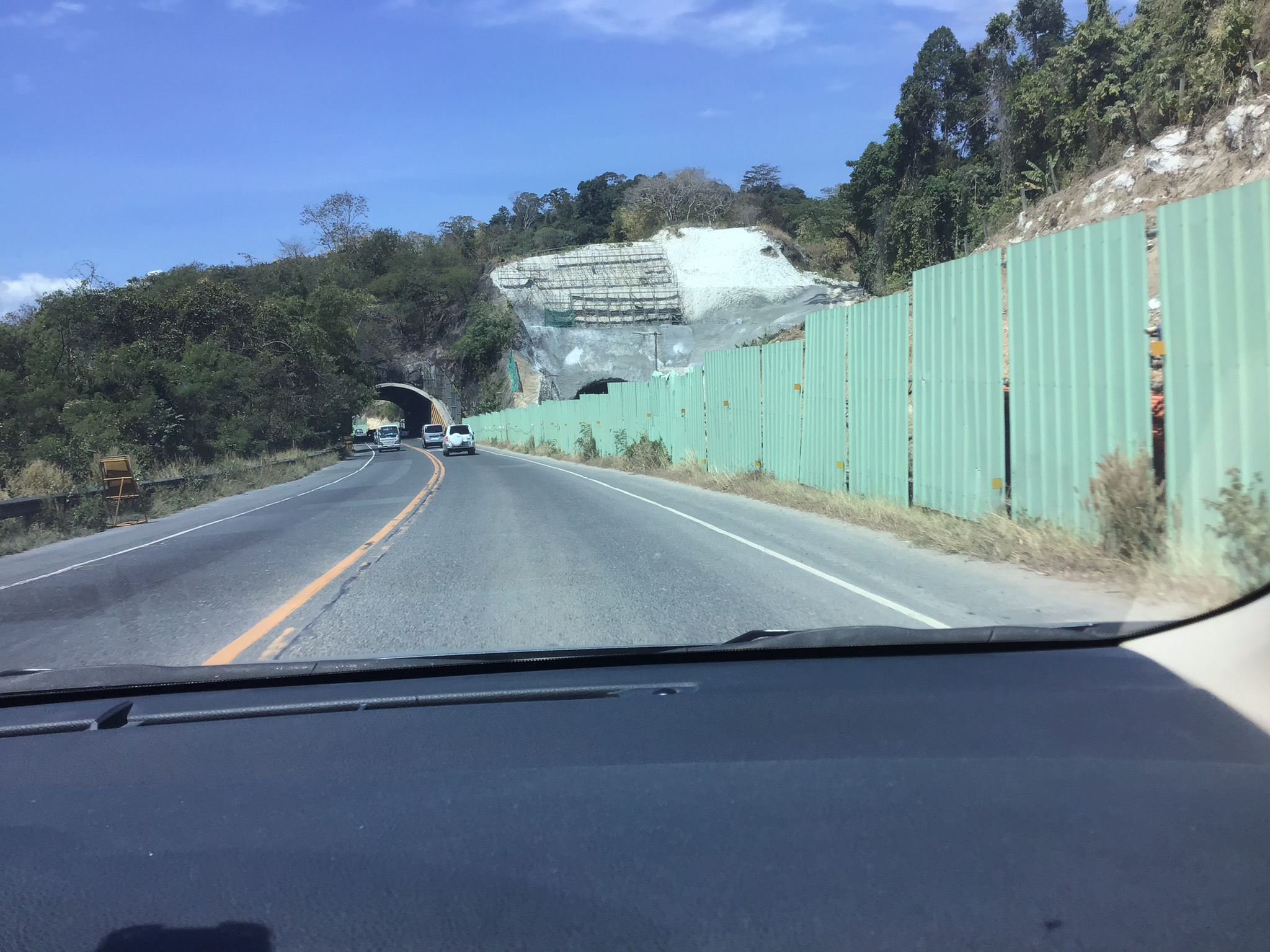
Expansion of the Subic Freeport Expressway

=== Roads ===
Project	Construction	Status	Completion date	Ref.
Bacolod–Negros Occidental Economic Highway	2017–2024	Under-construction	2024	
Boracay Circumferential Road	2018–2022	Completed	March 12, 2022	
Cabagan–Santa Maria Bridge	2014–2025	Completed	February 1, 2025	
Cagayan de Oro Coastal Road	1997–2017	Completed	November 10, 2017	
Camalig Bypass Road	2018–2021	Completed	June 15, 2021	
Camarines Sur High-Speed Highway	2019–	Under-construction		
Davao City Bypass Road	2020–2022	Under-construction	2022	
Davao City Coastal Road	2017–2023	Completed	July 1, 2023	
EDSA Greenways	Late 2025	Proposed	2028	
Iconic Bridges Project: Alcala Bridge	2025–	Under-construction		
Iconic Bridges Project: Camalaniugan Bridge	2021–	Under-construction	January 2026	
Iconic Bridges Project: Pinacanauan Bridge 2	2022–	Under-construction	2028	
Iconic Bridges Project: Solana-Tuguegarao Bridge	2022–	Completed	December 19, 2024	
Improving Growth Corridors in Mindanao Road Sector Project (former Tawi-Tawi Interlink Bridge and Guicam Bridge)		Under-construction		
Mindanao Development Road Network		Under-construction		
New Bacolod Economic Highway		Under-construction		
Pasacao–Balatan Tourism Coastal Highway	2019–	Under-construction		
Road Network Development Project in Conflict Affected Areas in Mindanao		Under-construction		
Samar Pacific Coastal Road	2018–2022	Completed	June 28, 2022	
Sariaya Bypass Road	2014–2021	Completed	October 21, 2021	
Sindangan-Bayog-Lakewood Road	2014–2022	Under-construction	2022	
Sorsogon City Coastal Road	2015–2020	Completed	August 30, 2020	
Surallah-T'boli-San Jose Road	2016–2022	Under-construction	2022	
Urdaneta City Bypass Road	2019–2021	Completed	January 18, 2021	
Inter-island Bridges
Bataan–Cavite Interlink Bridge	2022-2027	Proposed	2027	
Cebu–Mactan Bridge and Coastal Road Construction project		Proposed		
Coron–Culion Bridge	2021–	Under-construction		
Mindoro–Batangas Super Bridge		Proposed		
Panay–Guimaras–Negros Bridge (Phase 1)		Proposed		
Panglao-Tagbilaran City Offshore Connector Bridge		Under-construction		
Panguil Bay Bridge	2021–2024	Completed	September 27, 2024	
Samal Island–Davao City Connector	2022–	Under-construction	September 2028	
Roma Point Bridge	2018–	Under-construction		
Expressways (Note: The Cebu–Cordova Link Expressway (CCLEX, constructed from 2017 to 2022), although often cited as part the Build! Build! Build! program, is not officially enumerated among the program's projects.)
Davao City Expressway		Proposed		
Metro Cebu Expressway	2018–	Under-construction		
Pasig River Expressway		Proposed		
Luzon Spine Expressway Network
CAVITEX–C-5 Link	2016–2026	Completed	March 30, 2026	
Cavite–Laguna Expressway (CALAX)	April 2017–	Under-construction		
Cavite–Tagaytay–Batangas Expressway		Proposed		
Central Luzon Link Expressway (CLLEX)	2017–2021	Completed	July 15, 2021	
Metro Manila Skyway Stage 3	2014–2021	Completed	January 15, 2021	
North Luzon East Expressway (NLEE)		Under-construction		
NLEX Harbor Link	2014–2020	Completed	June 15, 2020	
NLEX Harbor Link Extension to Anda Circle		Proposed		
NLEX Connector	2019–2023	Completed	October 28, 2023	
Plaridel Bypass Road (Phase 2 and 3)	2014–2020	Completed	December 2020	
Quezon–Bicol Expressway		Cancelled		
Southeast Metro Manila Expressway (SEMME)	2018–2022	Under-construction	2022	
SLEX Elevated Extension	2019–2021	Completed	February 15, 2022	
SLEX Toll Road 4	2019–	Under-construction	2029	
SLEX Toll Road 5	March 2025–	Under-construction		
Subic Freeport Expressway Expansion	2019–2021	Completed	February 19, 2021	
Tarlac–Pangasinan–La Union Expressway (TPLEX) Extension		Proposed		
Metro Manila Logistics Improvement Network
Binondo–Intramuros Bridge	2018–2022	Completed	April 5, 2022	
Eastbank–Westbank Bridge 2	2024–	Under-construction		
New Estrella–Pantaleon Bridge	2019–2021	Completed	July 29, 2021	
Bonifacio Global City-Ortigas Center Link Road (Santa Monica–Lawton Bridge and Viaduct)	2018–2021	Completed	September 30, 2021	
J.P. Rizal–Lopez Jaena Bridge		Proposed		
J.P. Rizal–St. Mary Bridge		Proposed		
Laguna Lake Highway	2016–2018	Completed	November 15, 2018	
Lawton Avenue Expansion	2017–2022	Completed	May 2022	
Marikina–Vista Real Bridge		Proposed		
Mindanao Avenue Extension	2017–	Under-construction		
North–South Harbor Bridge	2021–2023	Proposed	2023	
Palanca–Villegas Bridge	2021–2023	Proposed	2023	
Metro Manila Priority Bridges Seismic Improvement Project
Guadalupe Bridge Rehabilitation		Proposed		
Lambingan Bridge Vertical Improvement		Proposed		

=== Airports ===
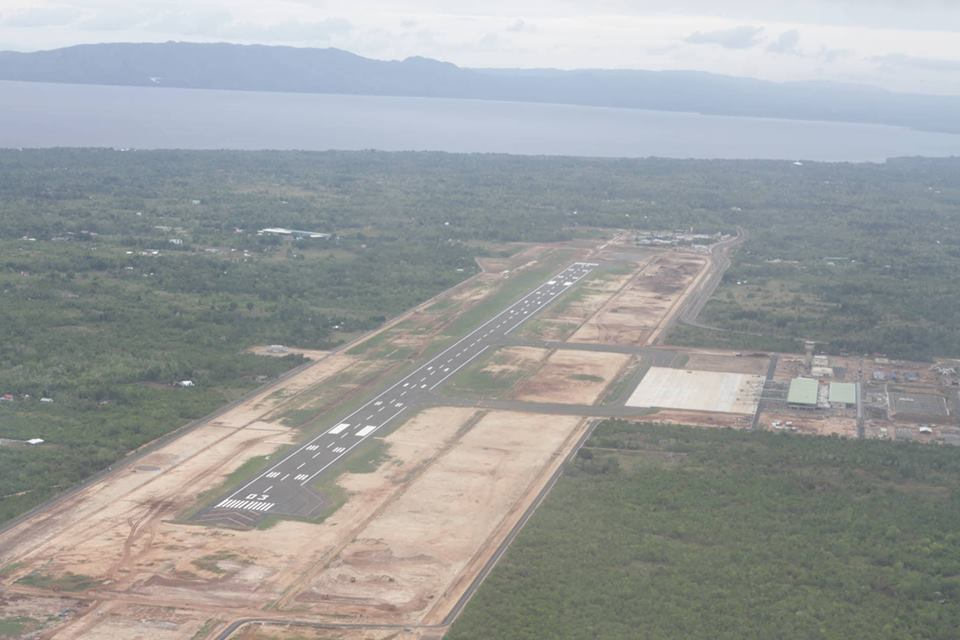
Bohol–Panglao International Airport

Project	Construction	Status	Completion date	Ref.
Bacolod–Silay International Airport		Proposed		
Bicol International Airport Development project (New Legazpi)	2016–2021	Completed	October 7, 2021	
Bohol–Panglao International Airport (New Bohol International Airport)	2016–2018	Completed	November 27, 2018	
Calbayog Airport expansion	2017–2021	Completed	May 5, 2021	
Clark International Airport expansion project Phase 1	2017–2022	Completed	May 2, 2022	
M'lang (Central Mindanao) Airport Development project		Proposed		
Francisco Bangoy International Airport expansion		Under-construction		
General Santos International Airport expansion	2018–2021	Completed	November 2021	
Iloilo International Airport expansion		Proposed		
Kalibo International Airport expansion	2018–2021	Completed	June 4, 2021	
Laguindingan Airport expansion		Proposed		
Mactan–Cebu International Airport expansion	2015–2021	Completed	May 5, 2021	
New Manila International Airport	2020–2026	Under-construction	2026	
Ninoy Aquino International Airport expansion		Proposed		
Puerto Princesa International Airport expansion		Proposed		
Sangley Point Airport	2019–2020	Completed	February 15, 2020	
Siquijor Airport upgrading and expansion	2018–2021	Completed	August 26, 2021	
Cagayan North International Airport (Lal-lo International Airport)	?–18	Completed	March 23, 2018	

=== Seaports ===
Project	Construction	Status	Completion Date	Ref.
Borac Port	?–2019	Completed	November 2019	
New Cebu International Container Port	2021–2024	Proposed	March 28, 2024	
Port of San Fernando	2019–2020	Completed	June 2020	
Port of Bataraza	?–2018	Completed	February 15, 2018	

=== Urban development ===
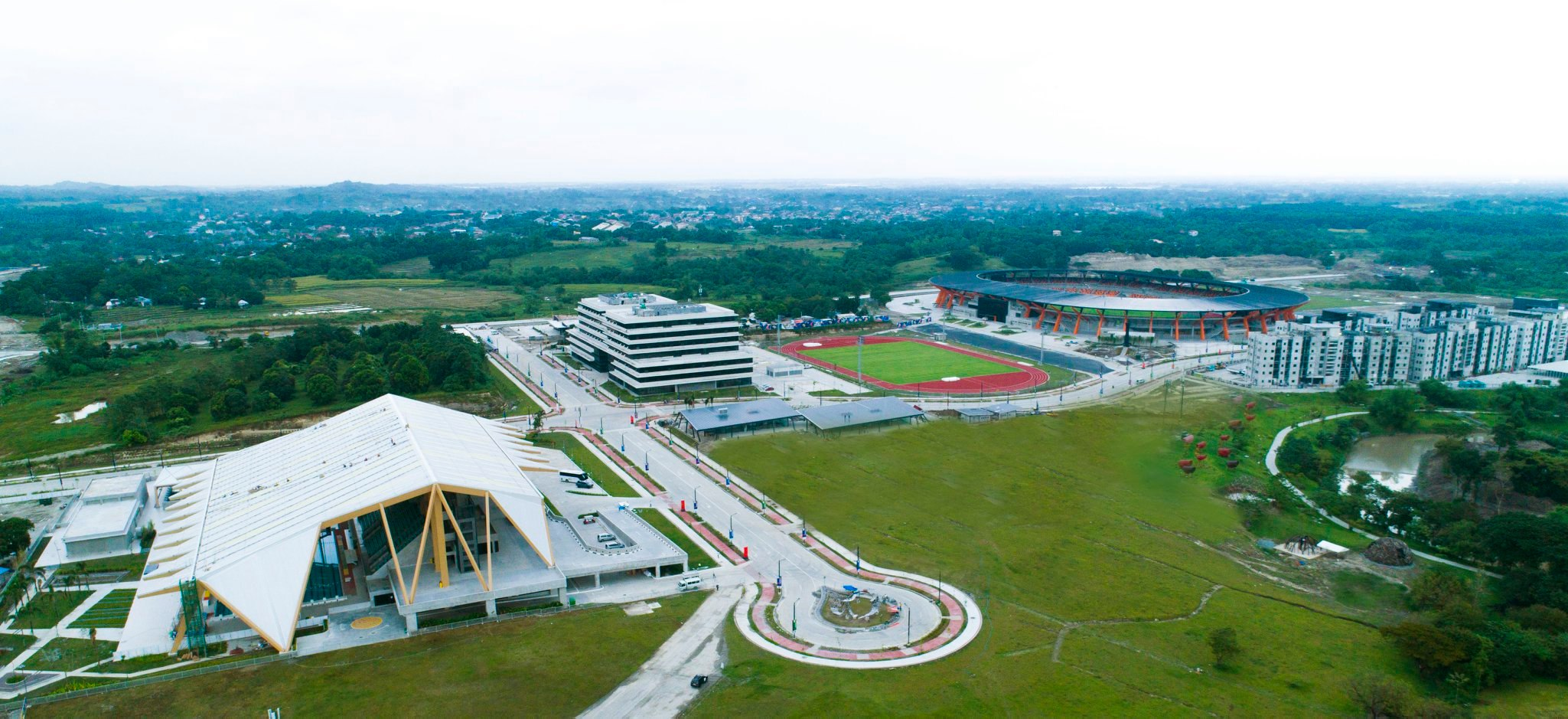
Phase 1 of the New Clark City

Project	Construction	Status	Completion date	Ref.
Ambal Simuay River and Rio Grande de Mindanao Flood Control projects		Proposed		
Bayanihan 2 Bike Lane Networks	2021	Completed	June 30, 2021	
Cavite Industrial Area Flood Management Program		Proposed		
Emergency Assistance for Reconstruction and Recovery of Marawi (Output 2: Reconstruction and Development Plan for a Greater Marawi, Stage 2)	2017–2022	Under-construction	2022	
Integrated Disaster Risk Reduction and Climate Change Adaptation in Low-Lying Areas of Pampanga Bay	2018–2022	Under-construction	March 2022	
Leyte Tide Embankment	2016–2022	Under-construction	2022	
Marawi Rehabilitation (China Grant) a.) Bridge and Bypass project b.) Grand Padian Market and Sports Complex	2017–2021	Under-construction	December 2021	
New Clark City Phase 1: a.) National Government Administrative Center Phase 1A b.) Filinvest Mixed Use Industrial Development Phase 1 (Site Development)	2016–2019	Completed	October 2019	
Pasig–Marikina River Channel Improvement project (Phase IV)		Under-construction		
Reconstruction and Development Plan for Greater Marawi	2017–2022	Under-construction	2022	

=== Water resources ===
Project	Construction	Status	Completion date	Ref.
Angat Water Transmission Improvement project	2016–2020	Completed	June 2020	
Aqueduct No. 7 project		Proposed		
Balog-Balog Multipurpose project Phase II		Under-construction		
Bohol Northeast Basin Multipurpose Dam project		Proposed		
Chico Pump Irrigation project	2018–2022	Completed	June 2022	
Jalaur River Multipurpose project Phase II	2019–2022	Under-construction	2022	
Lower Agno River Irrigation System Improvement project	2018–2022	Under-construction	December 2022	
National Irrigation Sector Rehabilitation and Improvement project	2013–	Ongoing		
New Centennial Water Source – Kaliwa Dam project		Under-construction	2026	
Malitubog-Maridagao Irrigation project		Proposed		
Water District Development Sector projects (ADB-WDDSP)		Proposed		
Wawa Bulk Water Supply project	2022–2025	Completed	2025	
Agus 3 Hydroelectric Power project (225 MW)		Proposed		
Agus-Pulangi Hydropower Rehabilitation project		Proposed		

=== Information and communications technology ===
Project	Construction	Status	Completion Date	Ref.
ICT Capability Development and Management Program		Under-construction		
LTO Central Command Center		Completed	February 4, 2022	
Luzon Bypass Infrastructure project		Completed		
Motor Vehicle Recognition and Enhancement System		Proposed		
National Broadband Program		Under-construction		
National Government Data Center		Proposed		
National Interoperable Automatic Fare Collection System project (formerly Automated Fare Collection Clearing House)		Proposed		
Philippine Identification System	2019–2020	Completed	2020	
Road Transport Information Technology Infrastructure project Phase I (LTO IT)		Under-construction	2022	
Safe Philippines Project Phase 1	November 2019	Cancelled	May 2022	

=== Health ===
Project	Construction	Status	Completion Date	Ref.
Virology Science and Technology Institute of the Philippines		Proposed		

== Impact ==
As of July 2021, 214 airport projects, 451 commercial social and tourism port projects, 29,264 kilometers (18,184 mi) of roads, 5,950 bridges, 11,340 flood control projects, 11,340 evacuation centers, and 150,149 classrooms had been completed under the infrastructure program. The numbers cited include newly built infrastructure, and projects involving the repair, rehabilitation, widening, and expansion of existing infrastructure.

By April 28, 2022, two months before Duterte left office, 12 out of 119 infrastructure flagship projects (IFP) under the Build Build Build program have been completed. Government officials emphasized that despite the low completion rate of IFPs, the Duterte administration had consistently spent more on infrastructure than past administrations. The remaining projects will be passed on to future administrations for completion and consideration.

The Philippine Daily Inquirer, citing a study from Pantheon Macroeconomics, wrote that "the Duterte administration had failed to achieve its ambitious spending targets despite having rolled out more infrastructure projects under the BBB program", citing the effect of the COVID-19 pandemic which affected infrastructure spending in 2020 as large portions of the budget had been reallocated to COVID-19 response efforts.
