= Santa Monica–Lawton Bridge =

Bridge in Metro Manila, Philippines

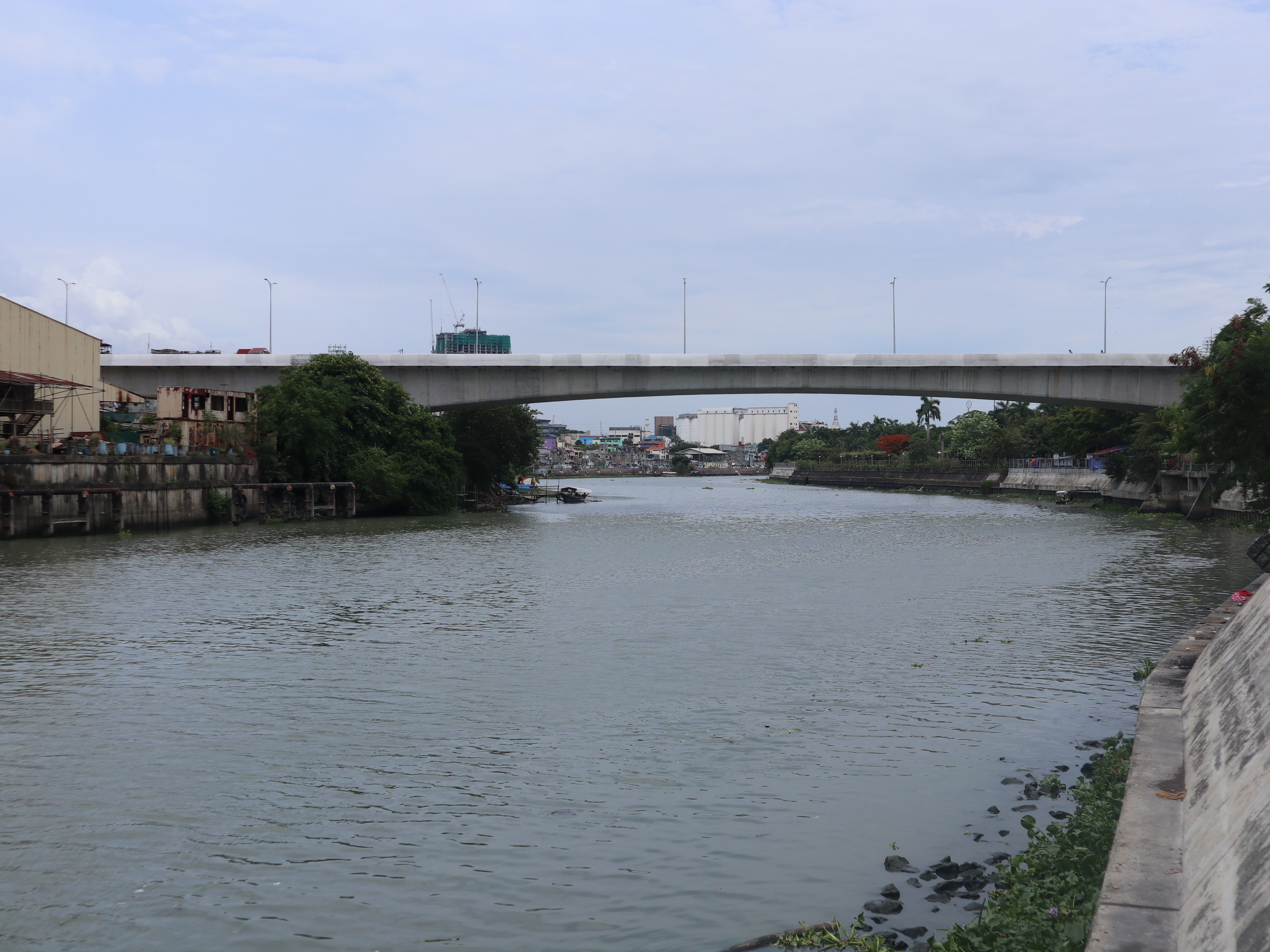
- Kalayaan Bridge, the main bridge, in 2021
- Coordinates: 14°33′58.752″N 121°3′17.6148″E
- Crosses: Pasig River
- Locale: Taguig and Pasig, Metro Manila, Philippines
- Other name(s): Bonifacio Global City–Ortigas Link Bridge; Kalayaan Bridge
- Preceded by: Guadalupe Bridge
- Followed by: C.P. Garcia Bridge

Characteristics
- Total length: 613.77 m (2,013.7 ft)
- No. of lanes: 4

History
- Construction start: July 19, 2017
- Construction cost: ₱1.857 billion
- Opened: June 12, 2021; 4 years ago (main bridge); October 1, 2021; 4 years ago (viaduct)

Location
- Interactive map of Santa Monica–Lawton Bridge

The Santa Monica–Lawton Bridge, also known as the Kalayaan Bridge and Bonifacio Global City–Ortigas Link Bridge, is a four-lane, two-way bridge across the Pasig River that connects Lawton Avenue in the Embo barangays of Cembo and West Rembo in Taguig to Fairlane Street (near Santa Monica Street to where the bridge is also named after) in barangays Kapitolyo and Pineda in Pasig. The bridge spans 613.77 meters (2,013.7 ft), and its construction cost is ₱1.857 billion as of 2017. The bridge also includes a 565-meter (1,854 ft) viaduct that connects it to 8th Avenue in Bonifacio Global City, Taguig.

The bridge aims to decongest nearby thoroughfares like EDSA and Circumferential Road 5 and cut travel time between Taguig and Ortigas from 30 minutes or 1 hour to only 12 minutes. The bridge was partially opened on June 12, 2021, with the completion of its key component, the Kalayaan Bridge, while the Lawton Avenue – Global City Viaduct opened on October 1, signalling the full completion of the bridge.

The bridge is currently passable to light vehicles only and does not allow full pedestrian access along the bridge.

== History ==
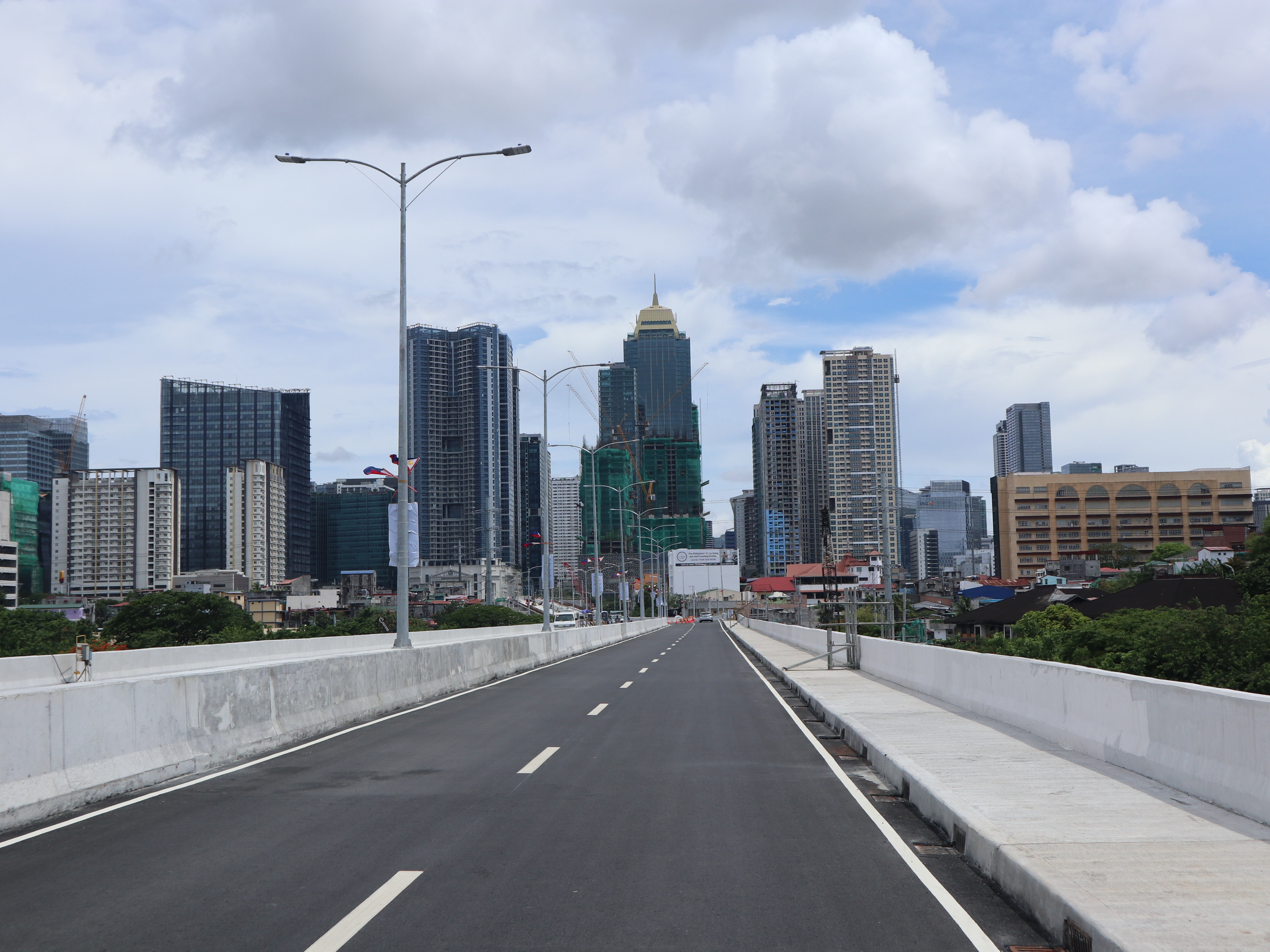
The view from the bridge southbound towards BGC in June 2021

The bridge was conceived only during the administration of President Rodrigo Roa Duterte as Phase I of the 1.48-kilometer (0.92 mi) Bonifacio Global City–Ortigas Link Road Project, which would connect the Bonifacio Global City in Taguig to the Ortigas Center in Pasig. The groundbreaking ceremony on the project took place as part of the Build! Build! Build! Infrastructure Program under the Duterte administration on July 19, 2017, marking the official start of construction. The project is handled by a joint venture of Persan Construction, Inc. and Sino Road and Bridge Group Company Ltd., with consultants DCCD Partners and Pertconsult International. Aside from the bridge itself, the construction project also includes improving access to the bridge by upgrading Brixton and Fairlane Streets on the Ortigas side and 8th Avenue on the BGC side. The bridge was originally expected to open in 2020 but was delayed until 2021 due to the COVID-19 pandemic.

The main section of the bridge was inaugurated by top government officials on June 12, 2021, coinciding with the Philippine Independence Day commemorations. It partially opened to vehicles on the same day. The southbound lane to Lawton Avenue was made accessible to vehicles on the same day, while the northbound lane was accessible to vehicles the following day. The Lawton Avenue – Global City Viaduct was then inaugurated by President Rodrigo Duterte on September 30, 2021, and was opened the next day.

== Bridge layout ==
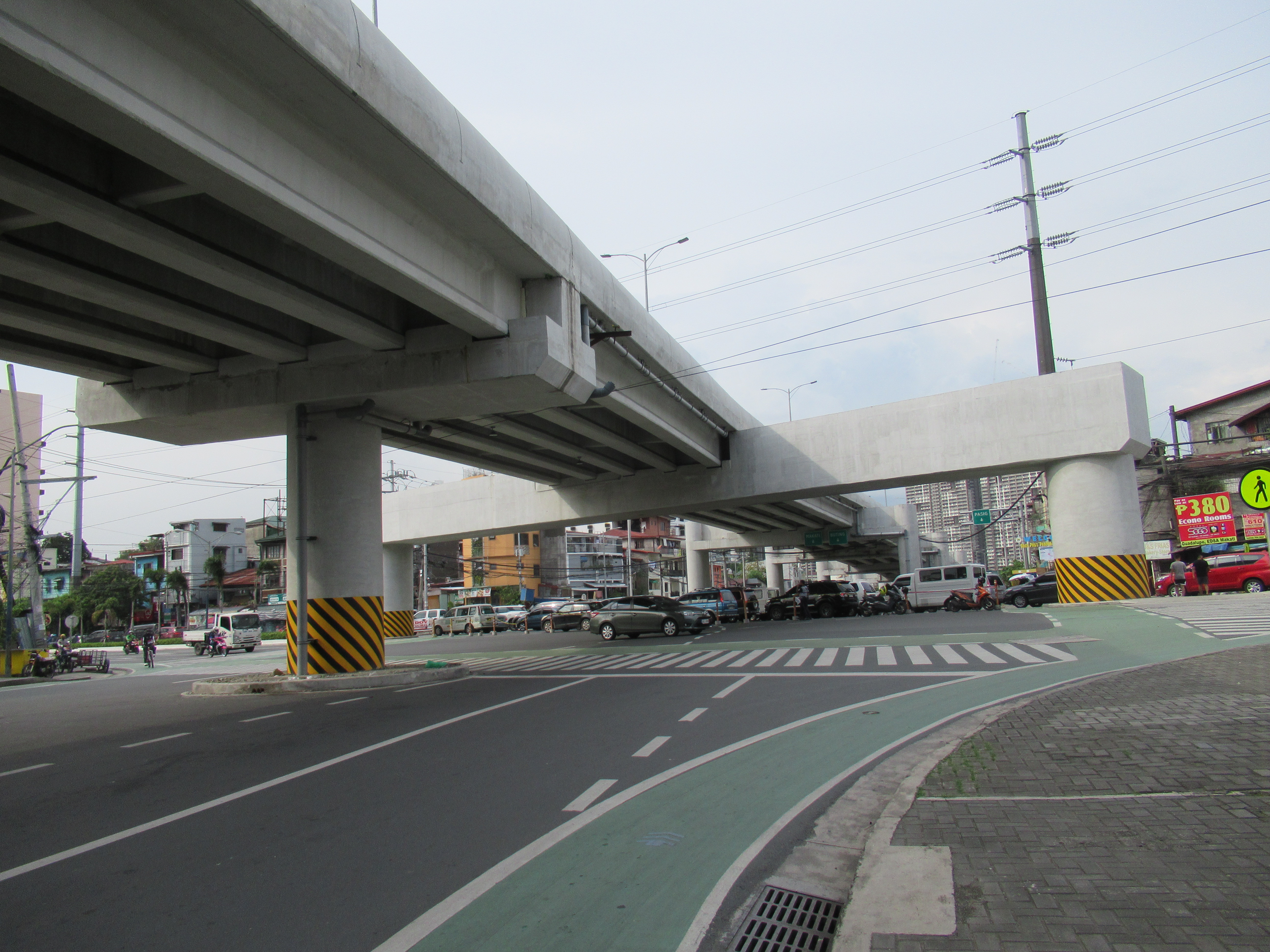
Lawton Avenue – Global City Viaduct

The bridge consists of a 4-lane main bridge spanning 613.77 meters (2,013.7 ft) that connects Lawton Avenue in Taguig to Fairlane Street in Kapitolyo, Pasig, across the Pasig River, Taguig People's Park, and J. P. Rizal Avenue, known as the Kalayaan Bridge. It also includes the Lawton Avenue – Global City Viaduct, a 2-lane, 565 m (1,854 ft) viaduct that connects the main bridge to 8th Avenue in Bonifacio Global City, Taguig, across Kalayaan Avenue.

== Criticism ==
When the Santa Monica–Lawton Bridge was opened to traffic on June 12, 2021, the lack of pedestrian access immediately available upon its opening was criticized online. Furthermore, observations noted that pedestrians were also forced to use several flights of stairs located on both ends of the bridge instead of being able to walk along the bridge from end to end.

The location and route of the bridge on the Mandaluyong and Pasig sides were also criticized for drawing and introducing traffic congestion onto the Kapitolyo neighborhood and the narrow Brixton Street in what an urban planner describes as "an example of Braess's paradox".

On June 23, 2022, Binibining Cebu 2016 winner Raine Baljak posted a video on TikTok where she tried to walk from Bonifacio Global City to Mandaluyong on foot, in which Google Maps gave her directions to use the bridge, despite its narrow and incomplete sidewalk. As a result, the video went viral and sparked multiple online discussions on the quality of pedestrian infrastructure in the country.

== See also ==
- List of crossings of the Pasig River
- Metro Manila Dream Plan
- Build! Build! Build!
