= Alfonso Umali Jr. =

Filipino architect and politician (born 1955)

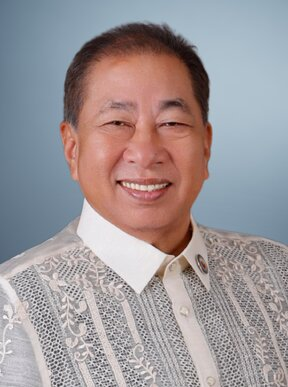
- Official portrait, 2025

Member of Philippine House of Representatives for Oriental Mindoro's 2nd district
- Incumbent
- Assumed office June 30, 2019
- Preceded by: Reynaldo Umali
- In office June 30, 2001 – June 30, 2010
- Preceded by: Manuel Andaya
- Succeeded by: Reynaldo Umali

11th Governor of Oriental Mindoro
- In office June 30, 2010 – June 30, 2019
- Vice Governor: Humerlito Dolor
- Preceded by: Arnan Panaligan
- Succeeded by: Humerlito Dolor

National President of the League of Provinces of the Philippines
- In office 2010–2016
- Preceded by: Loreto Ocampos
- Succeeded by: Ryan Luis Singson

National Treasurer of the Liberal Party
- Incumbent
- Assumed office January 19, 2011
- Preceded by: Rafael Nantes

Personal details
- Born: Alfonso Villar Umali Jr. April 29, 1955 (age 71) Tondo, Manila, Philippines
- Party: Liberal (2001–present)
- Spouse: Susan Magpantay
- Education: University of Santo Tomas (BS)
- Profession: Architect
- Nickname: PA

Alfonso "PA" Villar Umali Jr. (born April 29, 1955) is a Filipino architect and politician who has served as the representative for the Oriental Mindoro's 2nd congressional district in the Philippine House of Representatives since 2019, and previously from 2001 to 2010. A member of the Liberal Party, he served from 2010 to 2019 as the 11th governor of Oriental Mindoro.

== Early life and education ==
Alfonso Villar Umali Jr. was born on April 29, 1955, in Tondo, Manila, to Alfonso Umali Sr. and Alberta Villar. He attended the University of Santo Tomas where he earned a degree in architecture.

== Early career ==
Before entering politics, Umali served as the provincial administrator of Oriental Mindoro under the administration of Governor Rodolfo Valencia.

== House of Representatives (2001–2010) ==
In 2001, Umali ran under the Liberal Party for Oriental Mindoro's 2nd congressional district, succeeding Manuel Andaya. He was re-elected in 2004 and 2007. After reaching the three-term limit, he ran for governor of Oriental Mindoro.

== Governor of Oriental Mindoro (2010–2019) ==
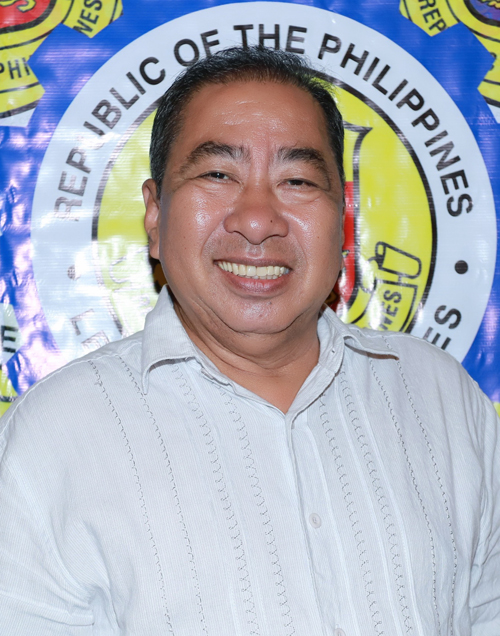
Umali in 2016

Umali ran for governor of Oriental Mindoro in 2010, narrowly defeating incumbent Arnan Panaligan by just over 200 votes. Panaligan filed an electoral protest before the Commission on Elections, which was dismissed on a technicality, upholding Umali's victory. In the same year, he was also elected national president of the League of Provinces of the Philippines.

In April 2015, the Sandiganbayan promulgated a 2008 decision finding Umali guilty of graft for illegally approving a ₱2.5-million loan to a ship owner in 1994 while serving as provincial administrator, alongside then-Governor Valencia and provincial board member Romualdo Bawasanta. Despite facing a penalty of 10 years' imprisonment and perpetual disqualification from holding public office, Umali was able to run in subsequent gubernatorial elections. On July 13, 2015, he filed a complaint for grave misconduct against Sandiganbayan Associate Justice Jose R. Hernandez for allegedly demanding ₱15 million in exchange for clearing him of the charges. A week later, on July 20, the Sandiganbayan denied his motion for reconsideration. The Sandiganbayan's conviction of Umali and his co-accused was later reversed and set aside by the Supreme Court in 2021, which acquitted them after finding that they had not acted in bad faith and that the transfer of public funds to private entities for an essential public purpose was allowed under the 1991 Local Government Code.

As governor, Umali implemented a province-wide ban on numbers games, such as small town lottery (a legal alternative to jueteng) and jai alai, led the provincial administration's opposition to the operation of Intex Resources, a large-scale mining firm, and presided over the inauguration of the proposed Mindoro–Batangas Super Bridge, whose construction had yet to begin as of 2026.

He served three consecutive terms, having been re-elected in 2013 and 2016, before seeking a return to Congress.

== Return to House of Representatives (2019–present) ==
After serving as governor, he returned to the House of Representatives in 2019, and was re-elected unopposed in 2022 and again in 2025.

In November 2024, Umali was recognized as one of the 11 outstanding congressmen at the Gawad Pilipino Awards.

=== Committee membership (20th Congress) ===
- Committee on Ecology (Vice Chair)
- Special Committee on Reforestation (Vice Chair)
- Special Committee on Strategic Intelligence (Vice Chair)
- Committee on Housing and Urban Development
- Committee on Public Works and Highways
- Committee on Science and Technology

== Party affiliation ==
Since 2001, Umali has been a member of the Liberal Party. He also serves as the party's national treasurer since 2011 and was re-elected in 2022 and 2026.

== Personal life ==
Umali is married to Susan Magpantay. He is the brother of the late Representative Reynaldo Umali.

== Electoral history ==
Electoral history of Alfonso Umali Jr.
Year	Office	Party	Votes received				Result
Year	Office	Party	Total	%	P.	Swing	Result
2001	Representative (Oriental Mindoro–2nd)	Liberal	—N/a	—N/a	1st	—N/a	Won
2004	Representative (Oriental Mindoro–2nd)	Liberal	—N/a	—N/a	1st	—N/a	Won
2007	Representative (Oriental Mindoro–2nd)	Liberal	—N/a	—N/a	1st	—N/a	Won
2019	Representative (Oriental Mindoro–2nd)	Liberal	—N/a	—N/a	1st	—N/a	Won
2022	Representative (Oriental Mindoro–2nd)	Liberal	82,761	44.46%	1st	—N/a	Won
2025	Representative (Oriental Mindoro–2nd)	Liberal	114,121	55.44%	1st	+10.98	Won
2010	Governor of Oriental Mindoro	Liberal	149,658	50.02%	1st	—N/a	Won
2013	Governor of Oriental Mindoro	Liberal	216,533	100.00%	1st	+49.98	Unopposed
2016	Governor of Oriental Mindoro	Liberal	217,103	—N/a	1st	—N/a	Won

House of Representatives of the Philippines
Preceded by Reynaldo Umali	Member for Oriental Mindoro's 2nd district June 30, 2019 – present (June 30, 2001 – June 30, 2010)	Incumbent
Preceded by Manuel Andaya	Member for Oriental Mindoro's 2nd district June 30, 2019 – present (June 30, 2001 – June 30, 2010)	Succeeded by Reynaldo Umali
Political offices
Preceded by Arnan Panaligan	Governor of Oriental Mindoro; June 30, 2010 – June 30, 2019	Succeeded by Humerlito Dolor
Party political offices
Preceded by Rafael Nantes	National Treasurer of the Liberal Party; January 19, 2011 – present	Incumbent
