= Makati–Mandaluyong Bridge =

Bridge in Metro Manila, the Philippines

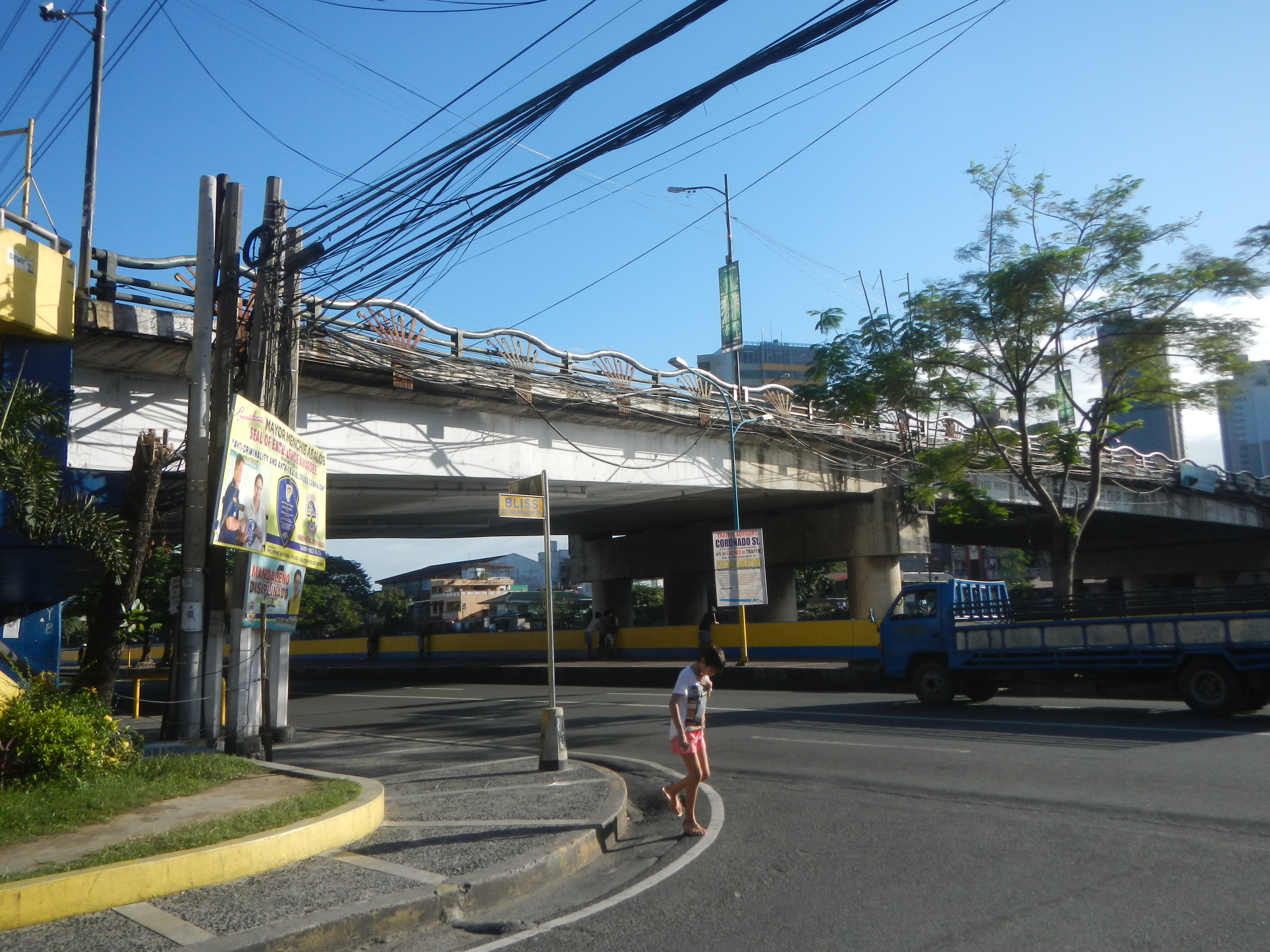
- The Makati–Mandaluyong Bridge from the Mandaluyong side
- Coordinates: 14.5694°N 121.0325°E
- Carries: Vehicular traffic and pedestrians
- Crosses: Pasig River
- Locale: Makati and Mandaluyong, Metro Manila, Philippines
- Maintained by: Department of Public Works and Highways 2nd District Engineering Office
- Segment ID: S04551LZ (northbound); S04552LZ (southbound); B04891LZ (bridge)
- Preceded by: Lambingan Bridge
- Followed by: Estrella–Pantaleon Bridge

Characteristics
- Material: Prestressed concrete, box girder
- Total length: 339 m (1,112 ft) (bridge); 0.29 km (0.18 mi) (road)
- Width: 8.93 m (29.3 ft)
- Height: 6 m (20 ft)
- Load limit: 20 metric tons (20 long tons; 22 short tons)
- No. of lanes: 4 (2 per direction)

History
- Construction start: Post-1970
- Construction end: 1986

Statistics
- Daily traffic: 42,000 vehicles (2013)

The Makati–Mandaluyong Bridge is a four-lane road bridge crossing the Pasig River between Makati and Mandaluyong in Metro Manila, Philippines. It connects P. Burgos Extension, a continuation of Makati Avenue in Poblacion, Makati, at the south bank of the river, to Coronado Street in Hulo, Mandaluyong, at its north bank. The bridge was opened in 1986.

The Hulo jeepney terminal, serving intra-city jeepney and tricycle routes in Mandaluyong, was established in 2015 and can be found under and adjacent to the bridge. Until the opening of the Estrella–Pantaleon Bridge in 2011, the Makati–Mandaluyong Bridge was the only bridge connecting the two cities other than the Guadalupe Bridge that carries EDSA.

== Gallery ==
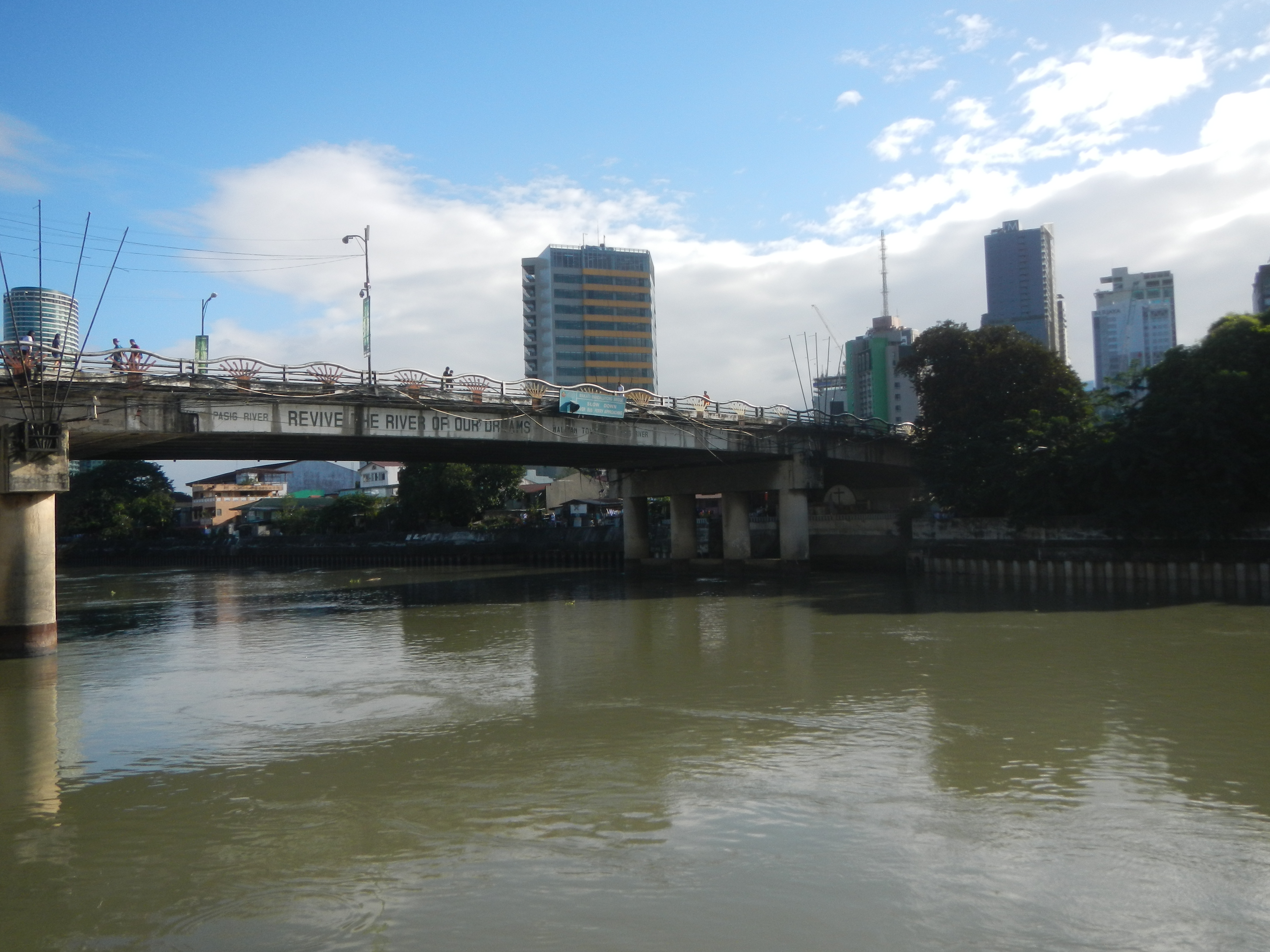
The bridge as seen from the north bank

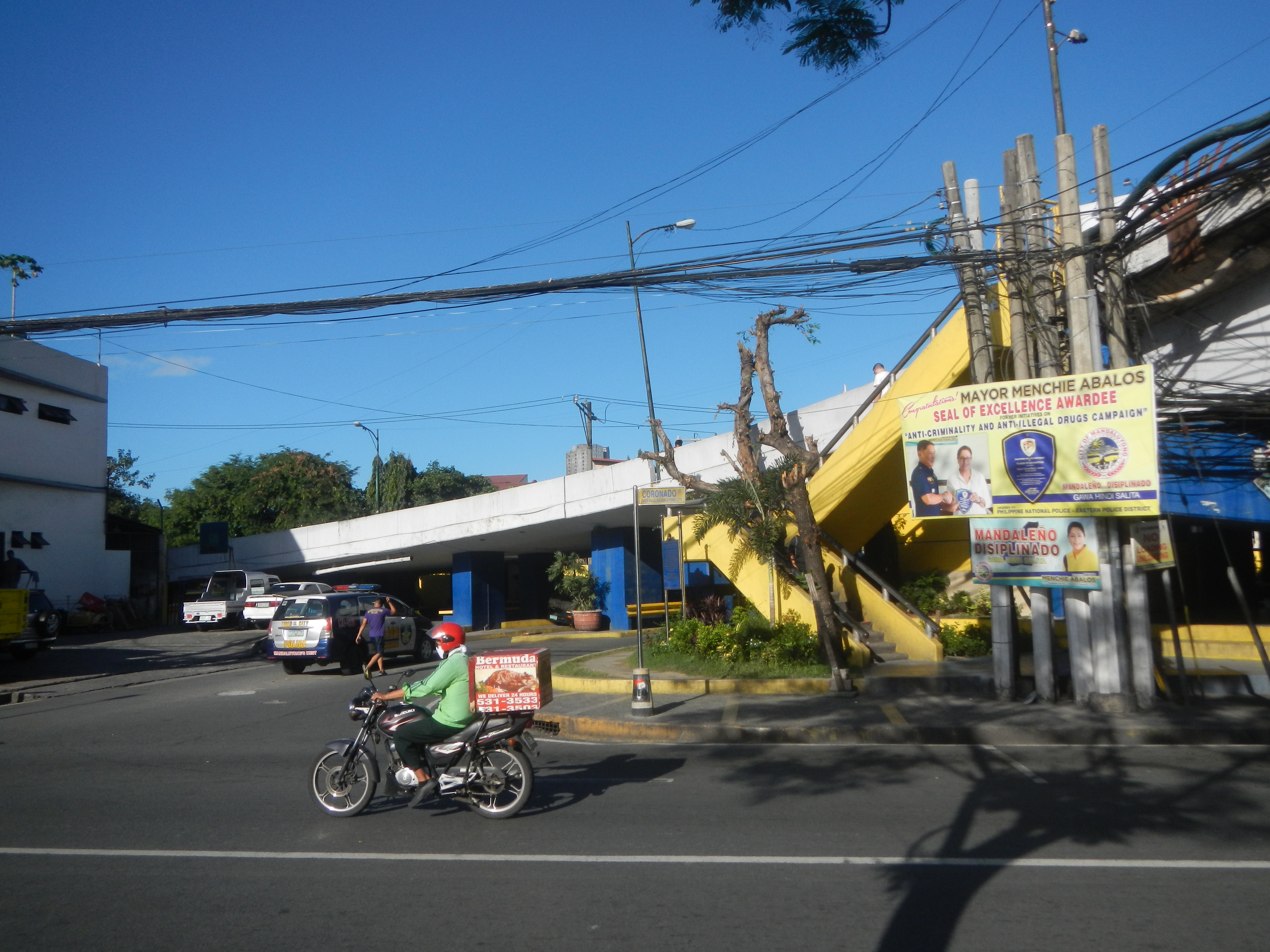
Pedestrian access for the bridge from Mandaluyong

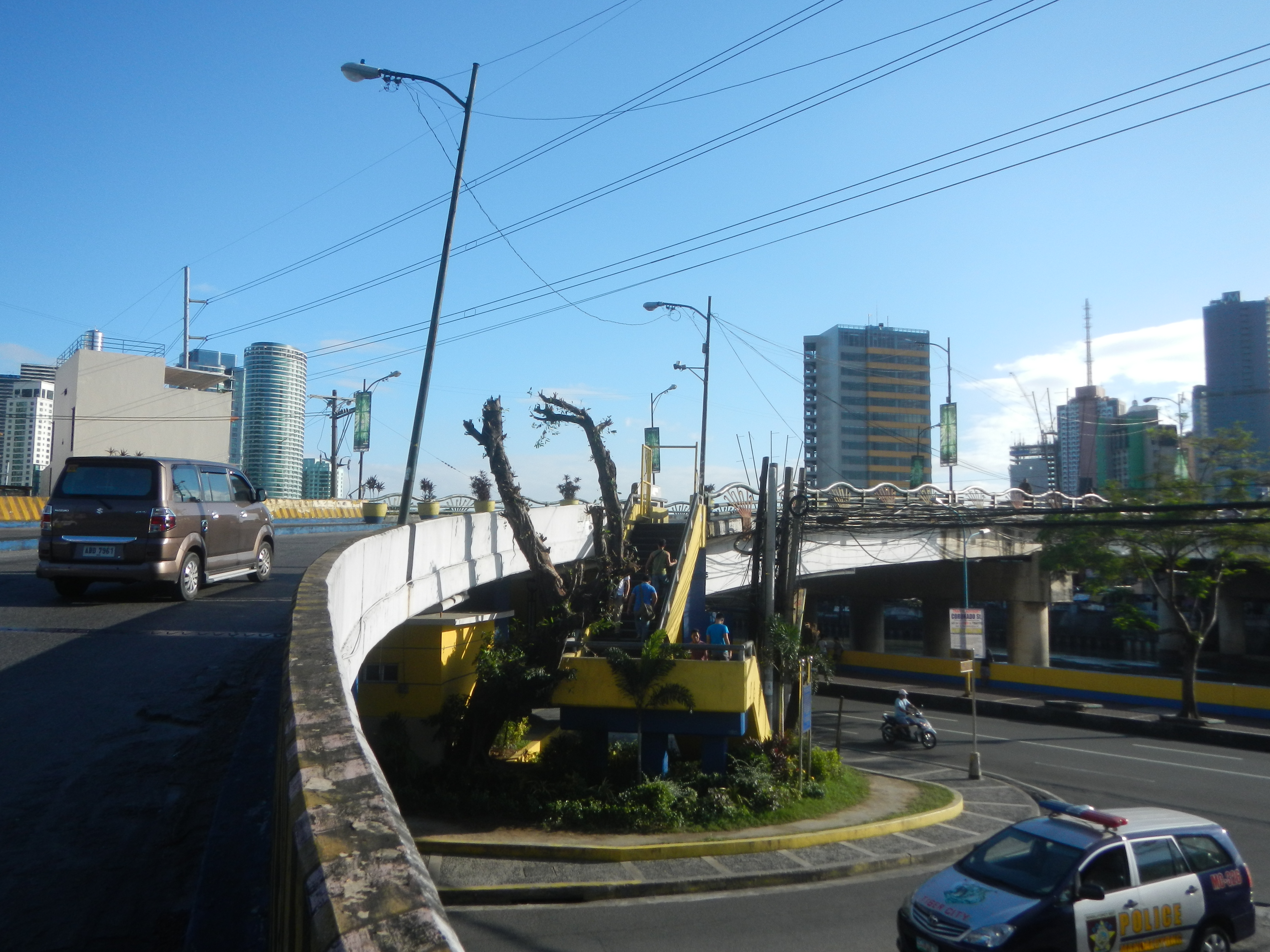
The bridge approaching Makati

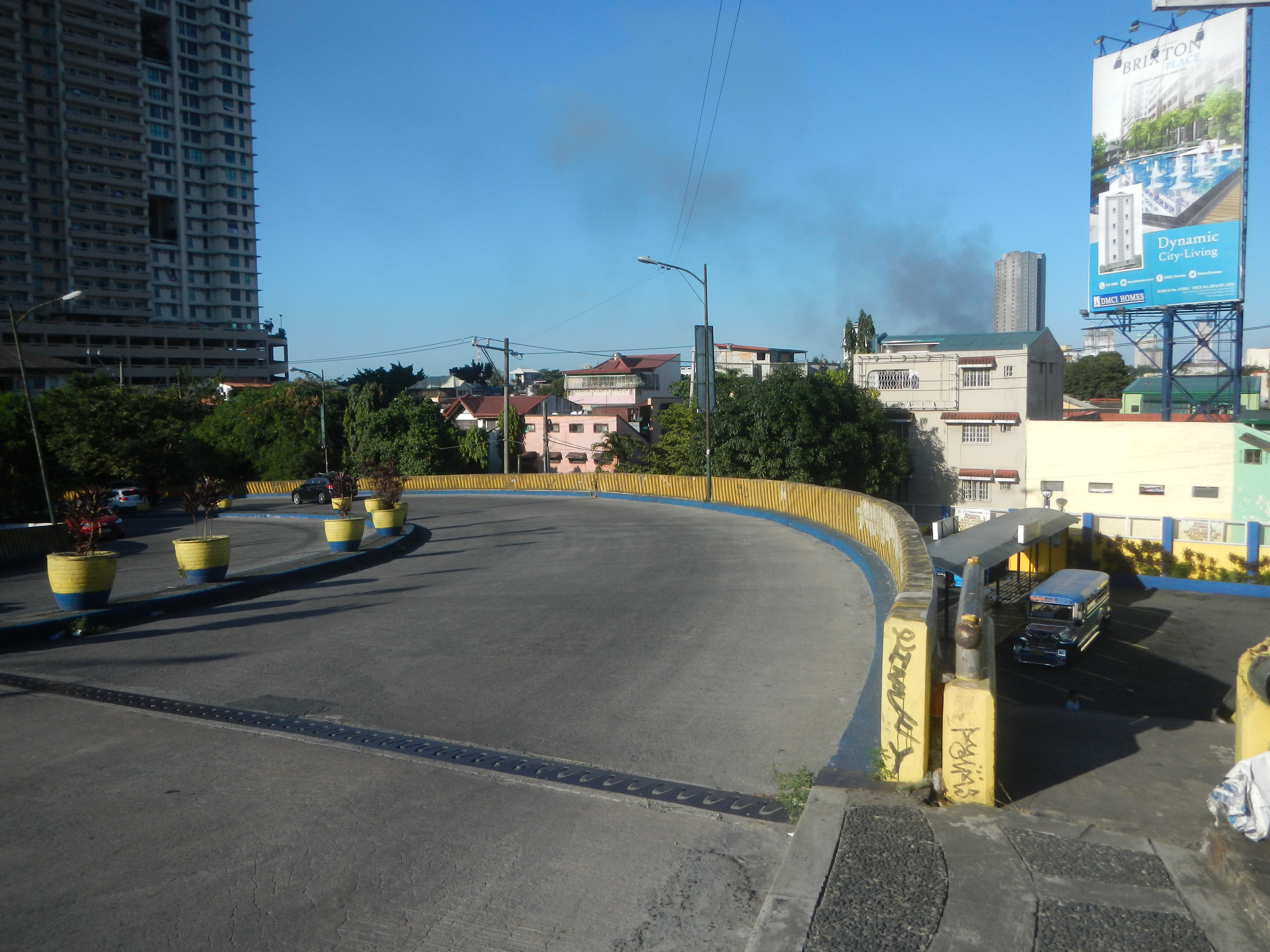
The bridge approaching Mandaluyong

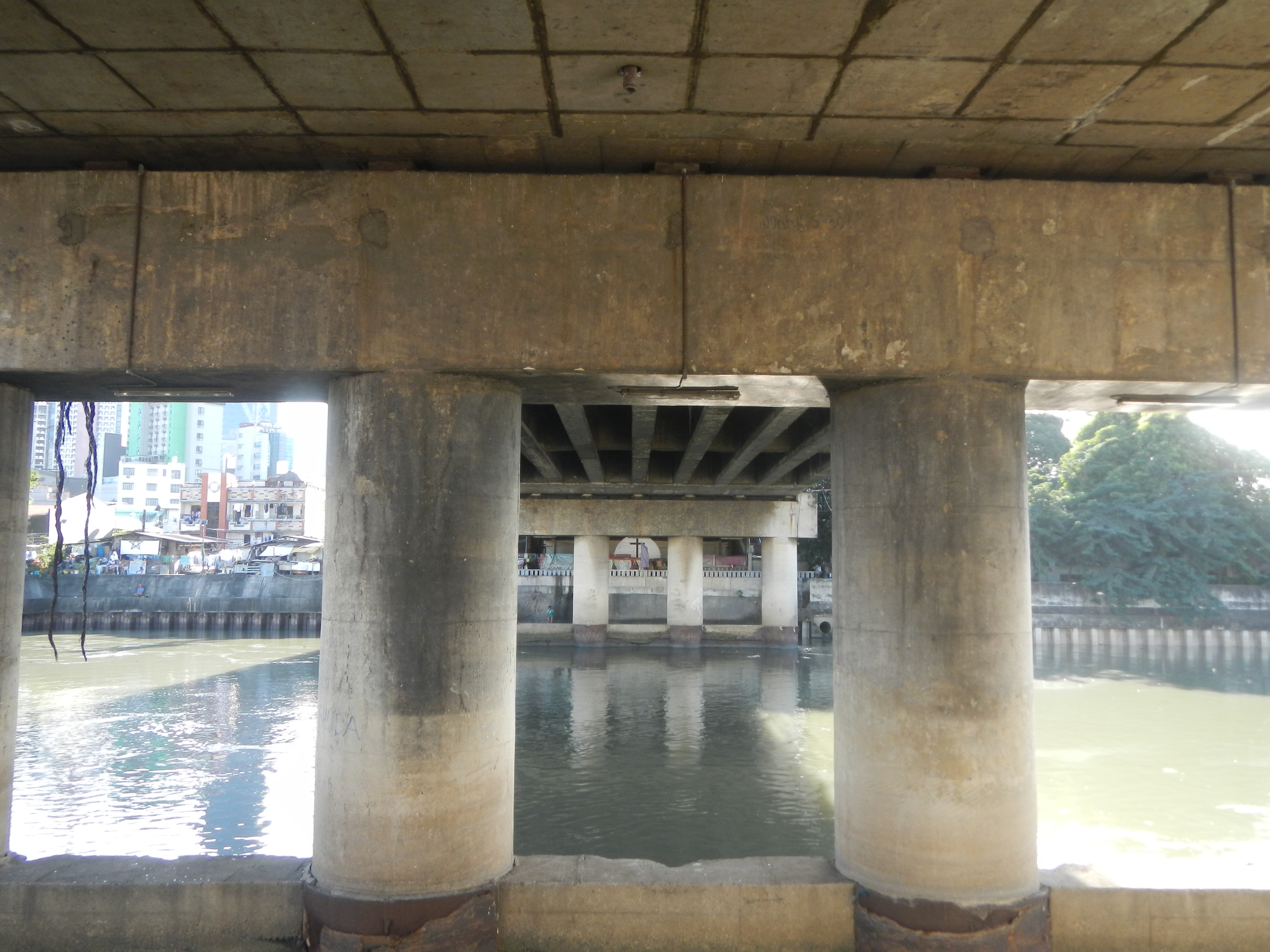
Bridge pier

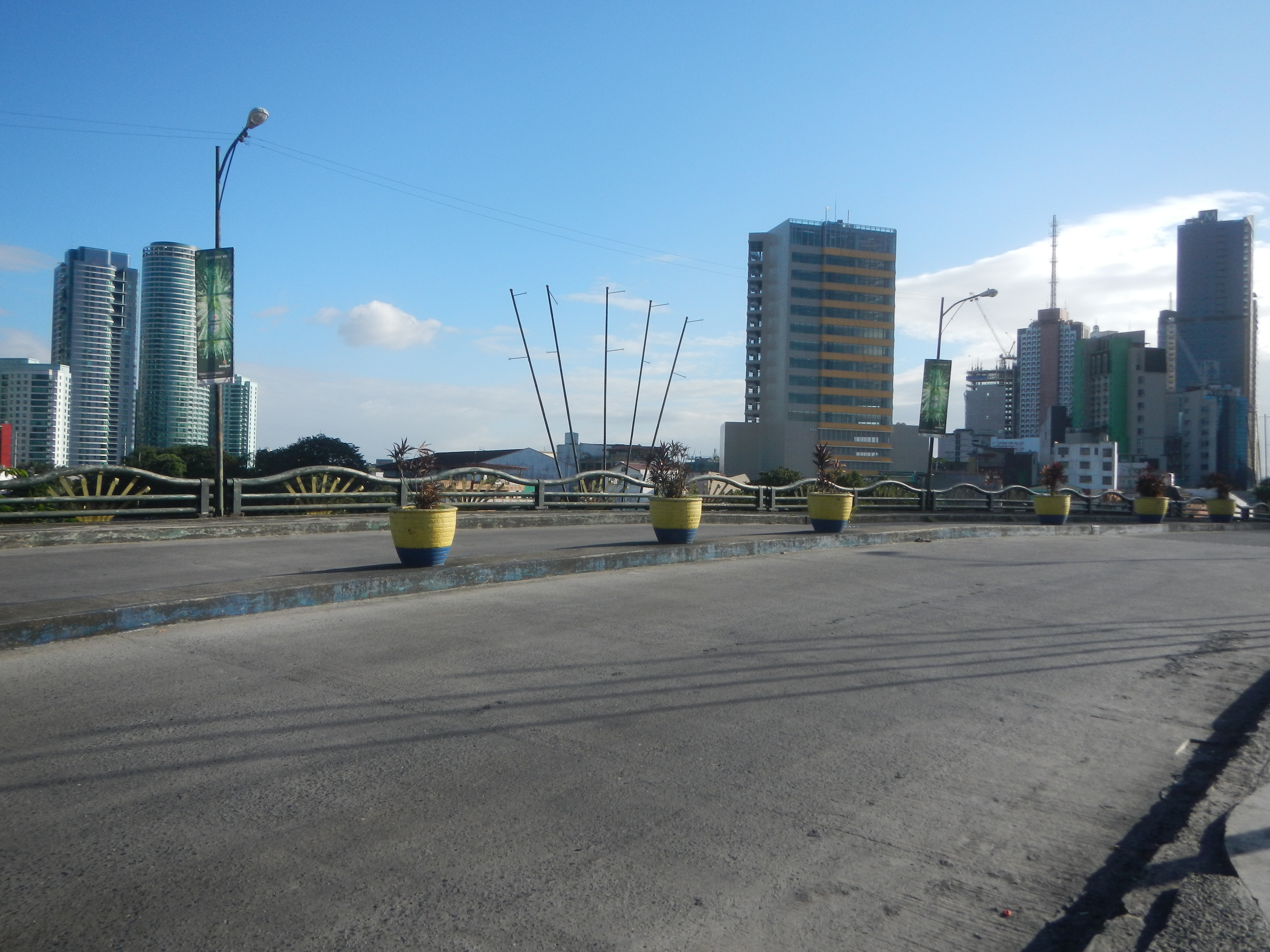
Road bridge
