= List of crossings of the Pasig River =

Locations of the bridges within Metro Manila that span the Pasig

This is a list of bridges and other crossings of the Pasig River in Metro Manila, Philippines.

The crossings are listed in order, starting from the mouth at Manila Bay and proceeding upstream to its source at Laguna de Bay.

As of 2026, there are 24 bridges in Metro Manila that cross the Pasig River, including three rail bridges carrying the LRT Line 1, MRT Line 3, and the Philippine National Railways track and one pedestrian bridge in Santa Ana, Manila. The Metro Manila Skyway is the first and only tollway bridge that crosses the river.

The planned Metro Manila Subway will also cross the Pasig River between Pasig and Makati, making it the first tunnel to cross the river. The proposed MRT Line 10 is the fourth rail bridge parallel to the existing Bagong Ilog Bridge of C-5.

== Current crossings ==
These are arranged from the mouth at Manila Bay to the source at Laguna de Bay.

#	Crossing	Image	North bank	Carries	South bank	Vertical clearance	Built	Coordinates
1	Roxas Bridge; M. Lopez Bridge		San Nicolas, Manila	Eight lanes of AH26 (Mel Lopez Boulevard)	Intramuros and Port Area, Manila	7.5 m (25 ft)	1975	14.595°N 120.965°E
2	Binondo–Intramuros Bridge		Binondo and San Nicolas, Manila	Four lanes between Muelle de Binondo and Muelle de la Industria to Solana Street and Riverside Drive	Intramuros, Manila	8.6 m (28 ft)	2022	14.59527°N 120.97481°E
3	Jones Bridge		Binondo, Manila	Four lanes between Padre Burgos Avenue and Quintin Paredes Street	Ermita, Manila	7.6 m (25 ft)	1946	14.595°N 120.972°E
4	MacArthur Bridge		Santa Cruz, Manila	Four lanes of N150 between Padre Burgos Avenue and Plaza Santa Cruz	Ermita, Manila	7.6 m (25 ft)	1952	14.596°N 120.980°E
	LRT Line 1 viaduct		Quiapo, Manila	LRT Line 1	Ermita, Manila		1984	14.596°N 120.980°E
5	Quezon Bridge		Quiapo, Manila	Four lanes of N170 between Padre Burgos Avenue and Quezon Boulevard	Ermita, Manila	7.0 m (23.0 ft)	1939	14.595°N 120.990°E
6	Ayala Bridge		San Miguel, Manila	Four lanes of N180 and C-1 between Ayala Boulevard and P. Casal Street	Ermita, Manila	4.9 m (16 ft)	1908	14.591°N 120.999°E
7	Mabini Bridge; Nagtahan Bridge		Santa Mesa, Manila	Eight lanes of N140 (C-2) between Quirino Avenue and Nagtahan Street	Paco, Manila	7.7 m (25 ft)	1945	14.595°N 121.005°E
8	Nagtahan Link Bridge; Padre Zamora Bridge; Nagtahan Link Bridge 3		Santa Mesa, Manila	Four lanes of N141 (Paco–Santa Mesa Road)	Pandacan, Manila	9.7 m (32 ft)	1998	14.594°N 121.012°E
	Pandacan Railroad Bridge		Santa Mesa, Manila	Philippine National Railways Metro Commuter Line (PNR South Rail)	Pandacan, Manila			14.594°N 121.012°E
9	Skyway Stage 3		Santa Ana, Manila	Seven lanes of Skyway	Pandacan, Manila		2020	14.58976°N 121.01394°E
	Kalahati–Beata river ferry		Santa Ana, Manila	Ferry	Pandacan, Manila	—N/a		
10	Abante Bridge; Tulay Pangarap Footbridge		Santa Ana, Manila	Pedestrian bridge	Santa Ana, Manila		2023	14.583°N 121.0116°E
	Punta–Santa Ana river ferry		Santa Ana, Manila	Ferry	Santa Ana, Manila	—N/a		
11	Lambingan Bridge		Santa Ana, Manila	Six lanes of New Panaderos Street	Santa Ana, Manila	7.6 m (25 ft)	1990	14.586°N 121.025°E
12	Makati–Mandaluyong Bridge		Hulo, Mandaluyong	Four lanes between P. Burgos Street and Coronado Street	Poblacion, Makati	6.0 m (19.7 ft)	1986	14.569°N 121.030°E
	Hulo–Poblacion river ferry Tawrian		Hulo, Mandaluyong	Ferry	Poblacion, Makati	—N/a		
13	Estrella–Pantaleon Bridge; Rockwell Bridge		Hulo, Mandaluyong	Estrella Street to Pantaleon Street	Poblacion, Makati	7.9 m (26 ft)	2021 (Note: It was originally opened in February 2011 and built as a two-lane steel bridge.)	14.567°N 121.037°E
14	Guadalupe Bridge		Barangka Ilaya, Mandaluyong	Ten lanes of AH26 (Epifanio de los Santos Avenue (C-4))	Guadalupe Viejo and Guadalupe Nuevo, Makati	8.0 m (26.2 ft)	1966	14.568°N 121.045°E
	MRT Line 3 bridge		Barangka Ilaya, Mandaluyong	MRT Line 3	Guadalupe Viejo and Guadalupe Nuevo, Makati		1998	14.568°N 121.054736°E
15	Santa Monica–Lawton Bridge; BGC–Ortigas Link Bridge; Kalayaan Bridge		Kapitolyo, Pasig	Four lanes between Fairlane Street and Lawton Avenue	Cembo and West Rembo, Taguig		2021	14.566°N 121.054°E
16	C. P. Garcia Bridge; Bagong Ilog Bridge; C5 Bridge; Pasig–Makati Bridge		Bagong Ilog, Pasig	Seven lanes of C5 and N11 between Carlos P. Garcia Avenue and Eulogio Rodriguez Jr. Avenue	West Rembo, Taguig	8.7 m (29 ft)	1998	14.560°N 121.066°E
17	Kaunlaran Bridge		Santa Rosa and Sumilang, Pasig	Two lanes between F. Flores Street and Lopez Jaena Street	Buting, Pasig		2015	14.55611°N 121.07075°E
18	Bambang Bridge; Ramon Jabson Bridge		Bambang, Pasig	Two lanes of N142 (Ramon Jabson Street)	San Joaquin, Pasig	6.0 m (19.7 ft)	1992	14.5538°N 121.07608°E
19	Kalawaan Bridge; M. Jimenez Bridge		Bambang, Pasig	Two lanes of M. Jimenez Street	Kalawaan, Pasig			14.554°N 121.081°E
20	Napindan Bridge		Pinagbuhatan, Pasig	Four lanes of Laguna Lake Highway (C-6)	Napindan, Taguig		2018	14.535°N 121.095°E

== Former crossings ==
These are arranged from oldest to newest.

Crossing	Image	North bank	Carries	South bank	Vertical clearance	Built	Destroyed	Replacement
Puente Grande		Binondo, Manila	Calle Nueva (E.T. Yuchengco Street) and Paseo de las Aguadas (Calle Padre Burgos)	Ermita, Manila		1630	1863	Puente de España
Puente Colgante; Puente de Claveria		Quiapo, Manila	South of Calle de Echague (Valderrama Street) and Paseo de Bagumbayan (Calle Padre Burgos)	Ermita, Manila		1852	1939	Quezon Bridge
Puente de Ayala (San Miguel section)		San Miguel, Manila	Calle Pascual Casal and Calle Concepcion (Natividad Almeda-Lopez Street)/Calle Marquez de Comillas (D. Romualdez Street)	Isla de Convalecencia		1872	1899	Ayala Bridge (II)
Puente de Ayala (Concepcion section)		Isla de Convalecencia	Calle Pascual Casal and Calle Concepcion (Natividad Almeda-Lopez Street)/Calle Marquez de Comillas (D. Romualdez Street)	Ermita, Manila		1872	1899	Ayala Bridge (II)
Puente de España; Bridge of Spain		Binondo, Manila	Calle Nueva and Paseo de Bagumbayan (Calle Padre Burgos)	Ermita, Manila		1875	1914	Jones Bridge (I)
Santa Cruz Bridge		Santa Cruz, Manila	Plaza Goiti and Arroceros Street	Ermita, Manila		1900	1945	MacArthur Bridge
Jones Bridge (I)		Binondo, Manila	Calle Rosario (Quintin Paredes Street)	Ermita, Manila		1919	1945	Jones Bridge (II)
Quezon Bridge (I)		Quiapo, Manila	South of Calle de Echague (Valderrama Street) and Paseo de las Aguadas (Calle Padre Burgos)	Ermita, Manila		1939	1945	Quezon Bridge (II)
Estrella–Pantaleon Bridge (I)		Hulo, Mandaluyong	Estrella Street to Pantaleon Street	Poblacion, Makati		2011	2019	Estrella–Pantaleon Bridge (II)

== Planned crossings ==
These are arranged from the mouth to the source.

Crossing	North bank	Carries	South bank	Vertical clearance	Projected completion	Coordinates
North–South Harbor Bridge	San Nicolas, Manila		Port Area, Manila			
Riverlane Bridge	Quiapo, Manila	Pedestrian	Ermita, Manila			14.5961°N 120.9818°E
Ayala Bridge II	San Miguel, Manila	Carlos Palanca Sr. Street to San Marcelino Street	Ermita, Manila			
Beata–F.Y. Manalo Bridge	Santa Ana, Manila		Pandacan, Manila			
Skyway-NLEX Connector Link Bridge	Santa Mesa, Manila	Skyway Stage 3 to NLEX Connector (Tomas Claudio Entry/Exit)	Paco, Manila			
F. Blumentritt–Antipolo Bridge	Hulo, Mandaluyong	F. Blumentritt Street to Antipolo Street	Poblacion and Valenzuela, Makati			
Metro Manila Subway tunnel	Pineda, Pasig	Metro Manila Subway	West Rembo, Taguig	—N/a		
MRT Line 10 Bridge	Bagong Ilog, Pasig	MRT Line 10	West Rembo, Taguig			
