= Build Better More =

Philippine government infrastructure program

The Build Better More (BBM) is the infrastructure program of the Marcos administration (2022–2028). It superseded the Build! Build! Build! infrastructure program of the Duterte administration (2016–2022). The following Infrastructure Flagship Projects (IFP)s were identified by the National Economic and Development Authority (NEDA).

The Marcos administration approved 194 infrastructure projects, ranging from public transport, power, health, information technology, water resources, and agriculture. 77 of those projects were carried from past administrations while 123 are “new and initiated” by the Marcos administration. The total cost for the Build Better More program is ₱9 trillion.

== List of infrastructure flagship projects ==
Project was carried over from the Build! Build! Build! infrastructure program of the previous Duterte administration (2016-2022).

=== Public transportation ===
Project	Construction	Status	Completion date	Ref.
Rail transportation
West Extension		Proposed		
Cavite Extension	2019–	Under-construction	2024	
Metro Manila Subway	2019–	Under-construction	2032 (partial), unknown (full)	
Mindanao Railway (Phase 1)		Proposed		
MRT Line 3 Rehabilitation Project (Phase 2)		Proposed		
MRT Line 3 South Extension Project		Proposed		
MRT Line 4		Proposed		
MRT Line 7	2016–	Under-construction	2027	
North–South Commuter Railway	2019–	Under-construction	December 2027 (Phase 1), October 2028 (Phase 2), January 2032 (full)	
PNR South Long Haul		Proposed	2025	
Subic–Clark Railway		Proposed	2025	
North Triangle Common Station	2017	Under-construction	2027	
Urban transportation
Cebu Bus Rapid Transit System	2023–	Under-construction		
Davao Public Transport Modernization Project		Under-construction		
Taguig City Integrated Terminal Exchange	2024	Under-construction	2028	

=== Roads ===
Project	Construction	Status	Completion date	Ref.
Arterial Road Bypass Project Phase III (Plaridel Bypass)		Completed	October 2023	
Bacolod-Negros Occidental Economic Highway	2017–	Under-construction	December 2024	
Boracay Circumferential Road	2018–2022	Completed	March 12, 2022	
Cagayan de Oro Coastal Road	1997–	Under-construction		
Sariaya Bypass Construction Project		Completed	October 21, 2022	
Davao City Coastal Road Project, including Bucana bridge	2017–	Under-construction	2025	
Improving Growth Corridors in Mindanao Road Sector Project		Proposed		
Laguna Lakeshore Road Network Development, Phase I		Proposed		
Metro Manila Bridges Project (under ADB Financing Facility) - 3 Bridges		Proposed		
Pasacao-Balatan Tourism Coastal Highway		Proposed		
Priority Bridges Crossing Pasig-Marikina River & Manggahan Floodway Bridges Construction Project (under China Government Facility) - 3 Bridges		Proposed		
Road Network Development Project in Conflict Affected Areas in Mindanao		Proposed		
Samar Pacific Coastal Road Project (SPCR)	2018–2023	Completed	July 14, 2023	
Sindangan-Bayog-Lakewood Road, Zamboanga del Sur and Zamboanga del Norte		Proposed		
Surallah-T’Boli-San Jose Road, South Cotabato		Completed		
Expressways
C-5 Southlink Expressway		Under-construction		
Cavite-Laguna Expressway (CALAX)	2015	Under-construction	2019 (Mamplasan to Sta. Rosa), 2021 (Sta. Rosa to Tibig-Kaong Road), Summer 2023 (Tibig-Kaong Road to Aguinaldo Highway) 2023/2024 (Aguinaldo Highway to Kawit)	
Camarines Sur Expressway	2022-	Under-construction		
Central Luzon Link Expressway (CLLEX), Phase I		Under-construction		
Davao City Expressway		Proposed		
Las Piñas–Muntinlupa Expressway		Proposed		
Mega Manila Skyway		Proposed		
Metro Cebu Expressway (Cebu Circumferential Road)	2020–	Under-construction		
NLEX Connector	2019–2024	Completed	March 2023 (partial), December 2024 (full)	
North Luzon Expressway (NLEX) Segment 8.2	2019–2024	Under-construction		
South Luzon Expressway (SLEX) Toll Road 4 (TR4)		Under-construction		
South Luzon Expressway (SLEX) Toll Road 5 (TR5) Segment 1	2019–2024	Under-construction		
Southeast Metro Manila Expressway		Under-construction		
Inter-island Bridges
Bataan–Cavite Interlink Bridge	2023–2027	Under-construction	2027	
Cebu-Bohol Bridge		Proposed		
Cebu-Mactan Bridge (4th Bridge) and Coastal Road		Proposed		
Panay–Guimaras–Negros Island Bridges		Proposed	2030	
Panglao-Tagbilaran City Offshore Bridge Connector		Proposed		
Panguil Bay Bridge	2021–2024	Completed	2024	
Samal Island-Davao City Connector Bridge	2024	Under-construction	2027	

=== Airports ===
Project	Construction	Status	Completion date	Ref.
New Manila International Airport	2020–2026	Under-construction	2026	
Sangley Point International Airport Development Project Phase 2	2022	Under-construction		
New Bukidnon Airport	2022	Under-construction		
Ninoy Aquino International Airport Rehabilitation Project		Proposed		
New Dumaguete Airport Development Project (Bacong International Airport)	2024	Under-construction		
Clark International Airport New Terminal Building	2017	Completed	2022	

=== Seaports ===
Project	Construction	Status	Completion Date	Ref.
Davao Sasa Port		Proposed		
New Cebu International Container Port		Under-construction	March 28, 2024	
Upgrading and improvement of the Iloilo International Container Port		Under-construction		
Calapan Port Passenger Terminal Building	2021	Completed	2023	

=== Urban development ===
Project	Construction	Status	Completion date	Ref.
Ambal Simuay River and Rio Grande de Mindanao River Flood Control and Riverbank Protection Project		Proposed		
Cavite Industrial Area Flood Risk Management Project		Proposed		
Climate Change Adaptation Works National Irrigation Systems (NIS)		Under-construction		
Construction of Farm-to-Mill Roads		Under-construction		
EDSA Greenways		Proposed	2027	
Emergency Assistance for Reconstruction and Recovery of Marawi (Output 2: Reconstruction and Development Plan for a Greater Marawi, Stage 2)		Proposed		
Expansion/Upgrading/Improvement of General Santos Fish Port, South Cotabato		Under-construction		
Flood Risk Improvement and Management Project for Cagayan De Oro River		Proposed		
FMRDP - Farm-to-Market Road (FMR) Projects		Under-construction		
Iconic Bridge Projects for Socio Economic Development, Phase I (UK-Assisted)		Proposed		
Improvement of Service Roads in National Irrigation Systems (NIS)		Under-construction		
Integrated Disaster Risk Reduction and Climate Change Adaptation (IDRR-CCA) Measures in the Low-Lying Areas of Pampanga Bay Project Stage II		Proposed		
Integrated Flood Resilience and Adaptation (InFRA) Project - Phase I		Proposed		
Metro Manila Flood Management Project, Phase I		Proposed		
Metro Manila Priority Bridges for Seismic Improvement Project		Proposed		
Pasig-Marikina River Channel Improvement Project, Phase IV		Proposed		
Pasig-Marikina River Channel Improvement Project, Phase V		Proposed		
Parañaque Spillway Project		Proposed		
Philippines Seismic Risk Reduction and Resilience Project		Proposed		
Pambansang Pabahay para sa Pilipino Housing Projects		Under-construction		
Regional Fish Port Project for Greater Capital Region (formerly Upgrading/Rehabilitation of the Navotas Fish Port Complex		Under-construction		

=== Information and communications technology ===
Project	Construction	Status	Completion date	Ref.
Digital Transformation Centers (Upgraded "Tech4ED" Project)		Proposed		
Maritime Safety Enhancement Project		Ongoing		
National Broadband Program (NBP)		Proposed		
National Government Data Center (NGDC)		Proposed		
Philippine Identification System	2020	Ongoing		
Philippine Sim Card Registration	2022	Ongoing		

=== Health ===
Project	Construction	Status	Completion date	Ref.
Health System Enhancement to Address and Limit (HEAL) COVID-19 Project		Proposed		
Philippines COVID-19 Emergency Response Project (PCERP)		Proposed		
UP PGH Cancer Center Project		Proposed		
Virology and Vaccine Institute		Proposed		
Philippine Center for Disease Control and Prevention		Proposed		

=== Agriculture, forestry and aquaculture ===
Project	Construction	Status	Completion date	Ref.
Requirements of the Program Beneficiaries Development Component of the Comprehensive Agrarian Reform Program		On-going		
Construction/Rehabilitation/Improvement of Fish Ports and Other Fishery Post Harvest Facilities		Under-construction		
Convergence Area Agro-Forestry Abundance & Productivity Using Integrated Technologies Through Barangay-based Agricultural Ventures and Advancement		On-going		
Halal Infrastructure Modernization Project		On-going		
Rice Infrastructure Modernization Project		On-going		
Second Additional Financing for Philippine Rural Development Project		On-going		

=== Energy and power ===
Project	Construction	Status	Completion date	Ref.
Agus-Pulangi Hydropower Plant Complex (APHC) Rehabilitation under Series of Project (SOP 1)		Proposed		

=== Water resources ===
Project	Construction	Status	Completion date	Ref.
Angat Water Transmission Improvement Project - Aqueduct No. 7		Proposed		
Bayabas Small Reservoir Irrigation Project		Under-construction		
Establishment of Groundwater Pump Irrigation Project		Under-construction		
Extension/Expansion of Existing National Irrigation Systems		Under-construction		
Jalaur River Multipurpose Project - Stage II, Iloilo	2019–	Under-construction		
Mindanao Irrigation Development Project		Under-construction		
New Centennial Water Source - Kaliwa Dam Project	2021–	Under-construction		
Repair of Communal Irrigation Systems		Under-construction		
Repair of National Irrigation Systems (NIS)		Under-construction		
Restoration of Communal Irrigation Systems		Under-construction		
Restoration of National Irrigation Systems		Under-construction		
Small Irrigation Project		Under-construction		
Wawa Bulk Water Supply Project		Under-construction	2025	
Water District Development Sector Project (WDDSP)		Proposed		
