= Virology and Vaccine Institute of the Philippines =

Filipino research institute

Agency overview
- Formed: September 12, 2025
- Parent department: Department of Science and Technology

The Virology and Vaccine Institute of the Philippines (VIP), a national research center of the Philippines which has a focus on virology and vaccine research. The VIP has no existing facilities yet with the main headquarters to be built in New Clark City, Capas, Tarlac.

== History ==
In response to the COVID-19 pandemic in the Philippines, proposals have been made to set up a virology research facility in the country. The Department of Science and Technology (DOST), headed by Secretary Fortunato de la Peña, announced in May 2020 that the science agency submitted a proposal to establish the Virology Institute of the Philippines, which is meant to conduct research on viruses and viral diseases affecting plants, animals, and humans. At the time, the Philippines only had the Research Institute for Tropical Medicine, which specializes in the research of infectious and tropical diseases.

There were moves to institutionalize the proposed virology research institute through legislation by Congress, in the House of Representatives alone, at least seven bills have been filed by mid-August 2020. Within the same month, the institute project has been included in the Philippine national government's Build! Build! Build! infrastructure program of President Rodrigo Duterte.

In July 2021, the House bills for the institute and a center for disease control (CDC) were approved on their third and final reading. President Duterte included the institute in a list of priority measures that he mentioned during his sixth and final State of the Nation Address (SONA).

In October 2021, a biosafety level 2+ (BSL-2+) laboratory was inaugurated in Taguig in preparation for the establishment of the VIP. However the laboratory itself is not part of the proposed VIP complex.

It was during the 20th Congress under the administration of President Bongbong Marcos that the Virology and Vaccine Institute of the Philippines (VIP) was institutionalized when he signed Republic Act No. 12290 into law on September 12, 2025.

== Proposed facilities ==
The Virology and Vaccine Institute of the Philippines has no existing facility yet. Its headquarters is proposed to be built at New Clark City in Capas, Tarlac. Five hectares of land have been allocated. The institute will include lecture halls, offices, greenhouses, and laboratories, including a BSL-4 lab, the first in the country.
