= Binibining Cebu =

Filipino beauty pageant competition

Miss Cebu
- Type: Women's beauty pageant
- Headquarters: Mabolo, Cebu City, Philippines
- First edition: 1984–85
- Most recent edition: 2024
- Current titleholder: Zoe Cameron; San Fernando
- Website: binibiningcebu.com

Miss Cebu (formerly Miss Cebu Tourism in 1984 to 1999 and Binibining Cebu in 2018 to 2021) is the oldest running beauty pageant in Cebu, Philippines.

The reigning Binibining Cebu is Beatrice Luigi Gomez from San Fernando.

== History ==
The beauty pageant was held in Cebu City every January during the Sinulog Festival, and it was organized by the city government and the city tourism office. In 2017, the pageant has been held every October with a different name, title, and organization.

== Titleholders ==
=== Miss Cebu Tourism (1984–1999) ===
| Year | Miss Cebu Tourism | Runners-up | | | |
| Year | Miss Cebu Tourism | First | Second | Third | Fourth |
|---|---|---|---|---|---|
| 1984–85 | Janice Bañez | Caroline Sainz | Emmeline Borromeo | Maria Rowena Modina | Sarah Veloso |
| 1986 | Digdig Ebarle | Beth Monson | Angie Veloso | Girlie Maraya | Joan Codina |
| 1987 | Jennifer Wee | Yvonne Aldenese | Kimberly Ruite | Grace Colmenares | Maria Mercedes Abellana |
| 1988 | Kira Arciaga | Lucrecia Perez | Grace Rodriguez | Maria Angelina "Anne" Merced | Cherry Pie Magbanua |
| 1989 | Carolyn Blanco | Daisy Mae Uykimpang | Reve Liza Abelarde | Marites Velez | Myra Macariola |
| 1990 | Monaliza Macariola | Hazel Hope Horfilla | Eve Marie Grace Kintanar | Lorna Quimco | Aissa Stephanie de la Cruz |
| 1991 | Vita Grace Ceniza | Mary Christine Carpio | Maria Therese Pabular | Doreen Dy | Gay Cabrera |
| 1992 | Christine Inocencio | Jade Trixie Pino | Sarah Bequilla | Maria Luz Borces | Carina Bejec |
| 1993 | Jasmin Iris Castillo | Anna Liza Caro | Michelle Orias | Geraldine Campbell | Maria Liza Costales |
| 1994 | Mary Jean Kho | Marie Joy Marababol | May Anne Solis | Cherilynne Antonette Garrido | Marifi Sismar |
| 1995 | Sharon Maureen Serrano | Sheila Suarez | Maria Lourdes Albano | Mary Therese Lilian Borromeo | Hearty Marie Rizarri |
| 1996 | Gretchen Loquias | Faith Clarin | Charlotte Perez | Wilma Tinio | Melanie Kittilsvedt |
| 1997 | Jo Anne Castillo | Malaka Lourdes Macarambon | Grea Tulio | Mahleen Zaragoza | Jesette Cui |
| 1998 | Aline Ramirez | Adriana Mabanta | Rosario Mecaral | Charmaine Bordallo | Riche Batiancila |
| 1999 | Maria del Carmen Antigua | Azenith Parado | Charmaine Christy Ybañez | Lou Ann Bacolod | Gay Manubag |

=== Miss Cebu (2000–2016) ===
| Year | Miss Cebu | Runners-Up | | | | Ref. |
| Year | Miss Cebu | First | Second | Third | Fourth | Ref. |
|---|---|---|---|---|---|---|
| 2000 | Cheryl Lopez | Mary Jane Pahang | Catherine Yap | Rowena Garcia | Elma Preglo | |
| 2001 | Laura Monserrat Salgado | Eva Marie Conel | Cherie Marie Amante | Darlyn Liezl Villanueva | Joey Mae Gayo | |
| 2002 | Melanie Ediza | Charina Dampor | Daniel Gonzales | Cathy Gabrino | Cheryl Pelayo | |
| 2003 | Maria Karla Bautista | Melissa Basubas | Glency Señires | Mariechris Kiara Masong | Niña Mae Villegas | |
| 2004 | Marnelli Abatayo | Golda May Gabriel | Recca Mae Menchavez | Guia Chua | Cermelli Canoy | |
| 2005 | Sarah Katrina Miñoza | Sarah Lei Espagnolo | Maricon Esperanza | Michaelyn Ledda | Marinela Tajanlangit | |
| 2006 | Stephanie Rose Señires | Angel Wella Luzano | Karla Paula Ginteroy Henry | Elaine Lourdes Gica | Jan Marie Aliño | |
| 2007 | Loise Angelique Moile Tan | Katrina Isabelle Ros | Maria Ruby Guinto | Maria Theresa Gorgonio | Carlisle Santos | |
| 2008 | Sian Elizabeth Maynard | Kathy Lynn Atuel | Charish Libatog | Priscilla Mae Honorio | Karen Nacario | |
| 2009 | Kris Tiffany Janson | Rizzini Alexis Gomez | Kim Burden | Micelle Iva Eguia | Tara Frances Oliver | |
| 2010 | Reena Elena Malinao | Maria Gresa Lugo | Maria Eliza Zosa | Rogelie Catacutan | Carole Monique de Leon | |
| 2011 | Mia Zeeba Ali Faridoon | Teffanie Lene Llamada | Vanessa Claudine Ammann | Rosemary Gore | Aiko Lyanne Serrano | |
| 2012 | Pierre Anther Infante | Rachel Chloe Palang | Ella Beverly Sarmago | Jonnie Rose Wee | Herlie Kim Artugue | |
| 2013 | Namrata Neesha L. Murjani | Therese Christine Llamada | Maria Gigante | Patricia Ann Estuart | Ely Rose Apple Angcon | |
| 2014 | Cheriemel Diane Muego | Eva Psychee Patalinjug | Hannah Marie Gore | Grace Anne Marie Yap | Crystal Star Aberasturi | |
| 2015 | Wynonah Van Joy Buot | Maria Genefe Navilon | Alvy Mae Castro | Lucena Rose Magdadaro | Domenic Reynes | |
| 2016 | Gabriele Raine Baljak | Tracy Maureen Perez | Shaila Mae Rebortora | Merl Gayo | Felina Joyce Lim | |

=== Binibining Cebu (2017–2021) ===
| Year | Binibining Cebu | Binibining Cebu Tourism | Binibining Cebu Charity | Runners-up | | Ref. |
| Year | Binibining Cebu | Binibining Cebu Tourism | Binibining Cebu Charity | First | Second | Ref. |
|---|---|---|---|---|---|---|
| 2017 | Apriel Smith; Badian | Samantha Ashley Lo; Asturias | Maria Gigante; Bantayan | Ingrid Elizabeth Gerodias; Minglanilla | Kathleen Mae Lendio; Danao | |
| Year | Binibining Cebu | Binibining Cebu Tourism | Binibining Cebu Charity | Binibining Cebu Heritage | Binibining Cebu Ecology | Ref. |
| 2018 | Steffi Rose Aberasturi; Mandaue | Kimberly Covert; Alegria | Tracy Maureen Perez; Madridejos | Lou Dominique Piczon; Ronda | Isabela Deutsch; Borbon | |
| 2019 | No competition held | | | | | |
| 2020 | Beatrice Gomez; San Fernando | Ameena Allababidi; Cordova | Betty Davis; Cebu City North | Marla Alforque; Carcar | Amanda Basnillo; Dalaguete | |
| 2021 | No competition held due to the COVID-19 pandemic | | | | | |

=== Miss Cebu (2022 – Present) ===
| Year | Miss Cebu | Runners-Up | | | | Ref. |
| Year | Miss Cebu | First | Second | Third | Fourth | Ref. |
|---|---|---|---|---|---|---|
| 2022 | Gabriella Mai Carballo | Dannika Anne Ocampo | Ciairha Jenyne Monsanto | Christine Marie Aberion | Karla Marie Frances | |
| 2023 | Kefaiah Al-zair | Patricia Gail Dueñas | Corinthia Marie Empe | Chynna Julienne Dorado | Niña Danielle Illustrisimo | |
| 2024 | Zoe Cameron | Joelle Devine Uy | Danielle McKaye de la Cruz | Angel Jane Ruiz | Shaina Michelle Reyes | |
| 2025 | Christine Escanilla | Angela Aumonier | Maijezel Sarcol | Tatiana Shantal Benedetti | Kiara Liane Wellington | |
