= Raine Baljak =

Filipino-Australian model

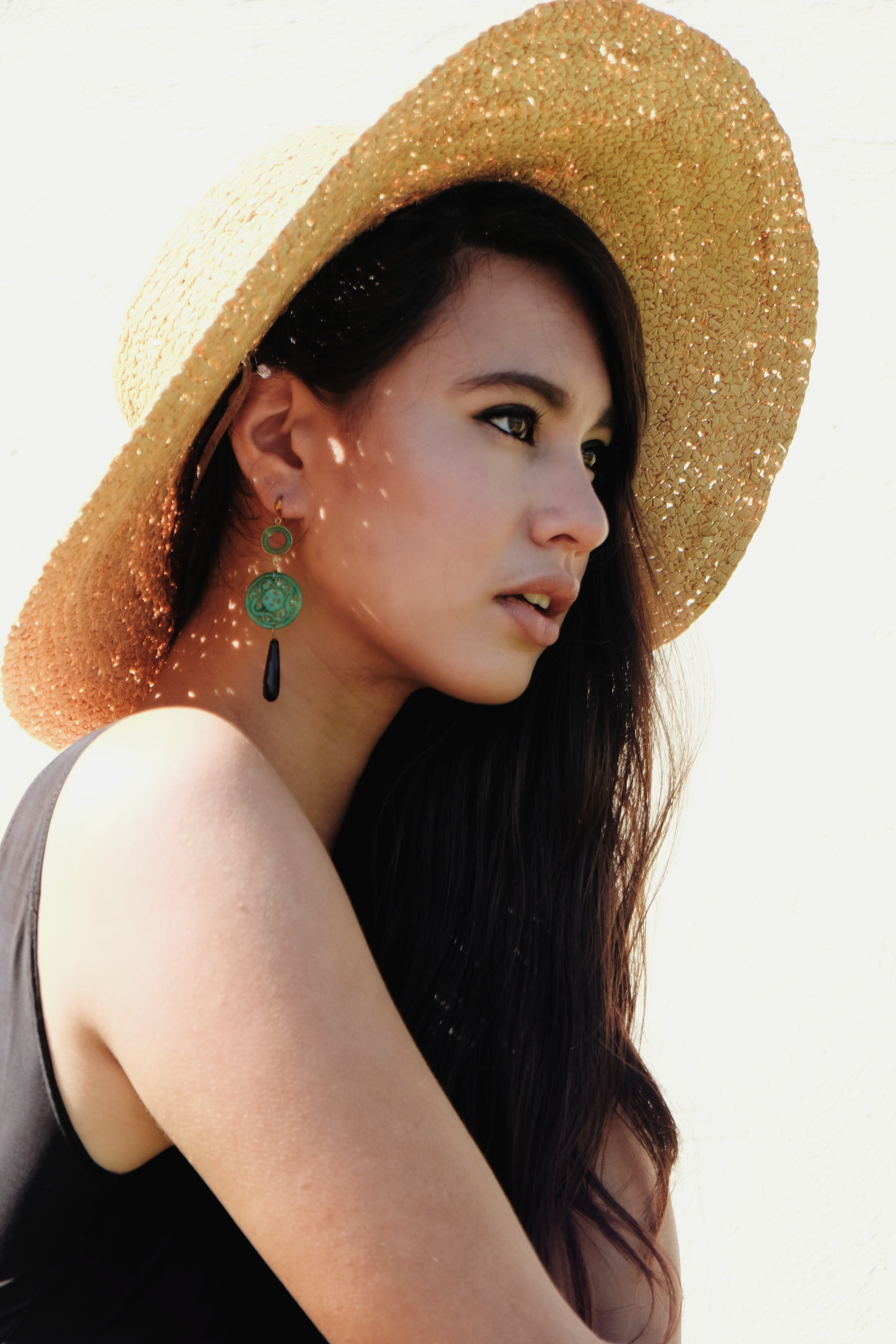
Portrait of Raine Baljak

Gabriele Raine Abellana Baljak (born 1996) is a Filipino-Australian former beauty queen. She was Miss Cebu 2016, and is a public speaker, health and fitness coach, model, researcher and scholar.

== Early life ==
Baljak was born in Sydney, Australia, and moved to Cebu City, Philippines as a child. She is also of Croatian descent.

She attended Cebu International School and is currently attending the University of South Australia (UniSA).

== Miss Cebu 2016 ==
On the first night she was awarded two of the four awards given, Miss Epson for her knowledge of Cebuano history and Best in Funwear in her two-piece creation by Mike Yapching. On the final evening she was named as ABS-CBN's Kapamilya Star of the Night and Best in Evening Gown wearing designer Dino Lloren.

== Researcher and scholar ==
While at UniSA, Baljak was awarded the UniSA Vacation Research Scholarship resulting in her first co-authorship for an editorial publication focused on 'Healthy Sleep and Nursing' in the Australian Journal of Advanced Nursing.

Then in December 2023, Baljak was awarded the New Colombo Plan Scholarship program by the Australian Government.
