= Estrella–Pantaleon Bridge =

Bridge in Metro Manila, Philippines

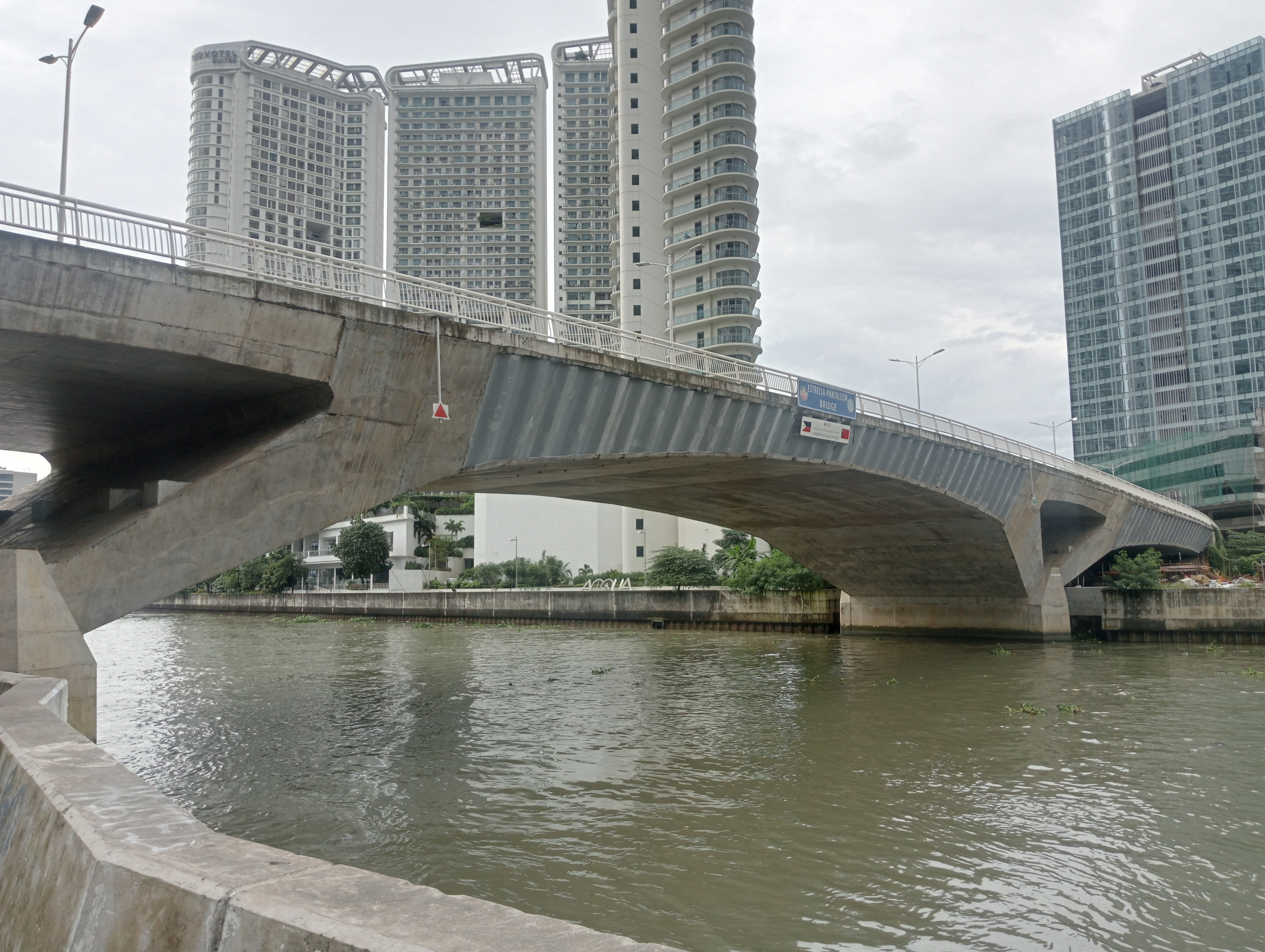
- The bridge in October 2023 from the Makati side
- Coordinates: 14°34′1.2″N 121°2′13.2″E
- Carries: Vehicular traffic and pedestrians
- Crosses: Pasig River
- Locale: Makati and Mandaluyong, Metro Manila, Philippines
- Other name: Rockwell Bridge
- Preceded by: Makati–Mandaluyong Bridge
- Followed by: Guadalupe Bridge

Characteristics
- Design: Truss bridge (first bridge); Box girder bridge (second bridge)
- Material: Steel (first bridge); Concrete (second bridge)
- Total length: 676 m (2,218 ft) (first bridge); 506.46 m (1,661.6 ft) (second bridge)
- Width: 21.65 m (71.0 ft) (second bridge)
- Longest span: 202 m (663 ft) (first bridge); 146 m (479 ft) (second bridge)
- No. of lanes: 2 (first bridge); 4 (second bridge)

History
- Constructed by: Department of Public Works and Highways (first bridge); China Road and Bridge Corporation (second bridge)
- Fabrication by: Waagner-Biro Philippines, Inc. (first bridge)
- Construction cost: ₱303.655 million (first bridge) ₱1.46 billion (second bridge)
- Opened: February 12, 2011; 15 years ago (original); July 29, 2021; 4 years ago (reopening)
- Rebuilt: 2019–2021

Location
- Interactive map of Estrella–Pantaleon Bridge

The Estrella–Pantaleon Bridge, also known as the Rockwell Bridge, is a four-lane box girder bridge crossing the Pasig River in Metro Manila, Philippines. It connects Estrella Street in Makati on the south bank of the Pasig River (near the Rockwell Center) to Pantaleon Street via Barangka Drive in Mandaluyong on the north bank, near the site of the Acqua Private Residences.

It is one of three bridges connecting Makati and Mandaluyong, the other two being the Makati–Mandaluyong Bridge connecting Makati Avenue and Poblacion, Makati, to Mandaluyong, and the Guadalupe Bridge carrying EDSA between the two cities, ultimately serving to help relieve chronic traffic congestion on the two other bridges.

== History ==
=== First bridge ===
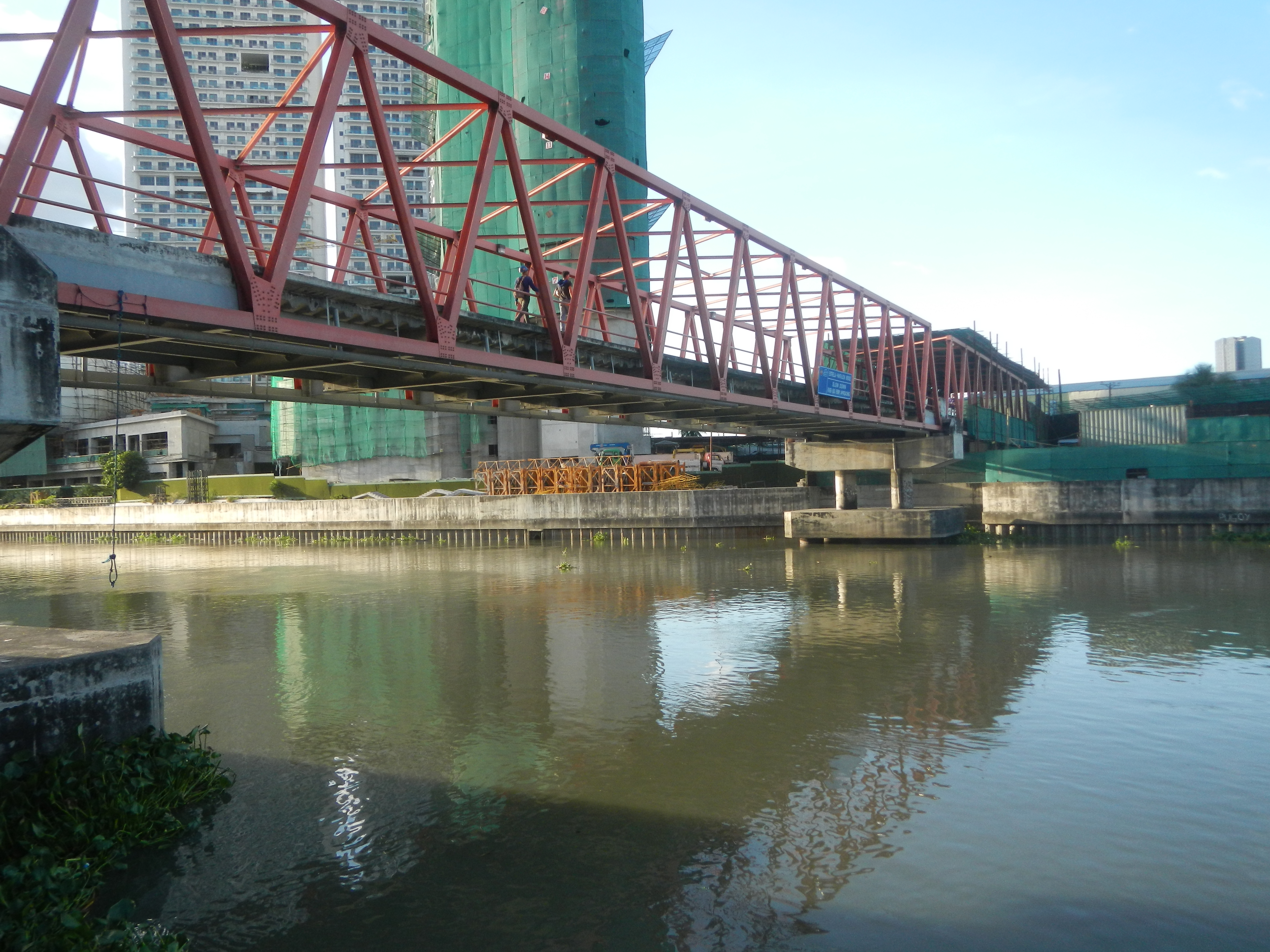
The original two-lane box truss bridge in 2016

Originally announced in 2003 by the Metropolitan Manila Development Authority (MMDA) as one of several bridges to be built by October that year, construction of the bridge would not be realized until several years later, when it was made part of the three-year Bridge Construction and Acceleration Project for Calamity Stricken Areas I (BCAPCSA I) program funded by Austria to help the Philippines build nineteen weather-resistant bridges, building on a similar program executed by the Austrian and Philippine governments between 2001 and 2005. The bridge was a 676-meter (2,218 ft) two-lane box truss bridge. Austrian firm Waagner-Biro provided the modular steel components for the bridge, while actual construction work was performed by the Department of Public Works and Highways (DPWH).

The ₱303.655 million bridge was inaugurated on February 12, 2011, by Vice President Jejomar Binay along with the mayors of Makati and Mandaluyong (Jejomar Binay Jr. and Benjamin Abalos Jr., respectively), Public Works and Highways Secretary Rogelio Singson, and Austrian ambassador to the Philippines Wilhelm Donko. The bridge opened to motorists on the same day.

=== Second bridge ===
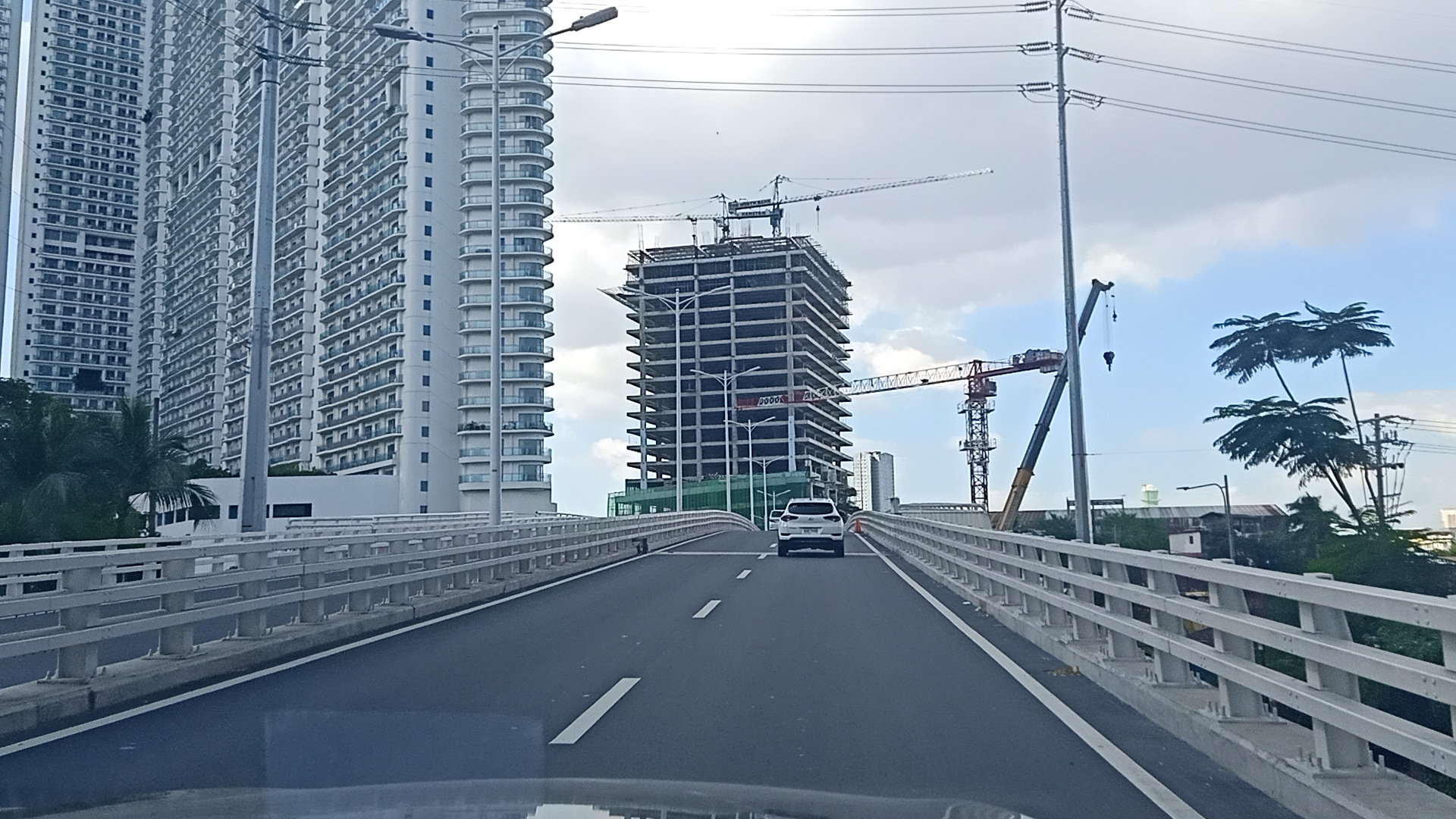
The bridge in October 2021 after expansion to four lanes

In June 2017, Public Works and Highways Secretary Mark Villar announced the expansion of the Estrella–Pantaleon Bridge. Funded by China, the new bridge has four lanes and is a 506.46-meter (1,661.6 ft) twin-spine steel box girder bridge with concrete deck slabs. It will utilize the existing approaches while modifying the abutment and piers to accommodate the new bridge superstructure. The bridge also has wider sidewalks with a width of 3 meters (9.8 ft). The bridge is designed to withstand high-intensity earthquakes. The project is handled by China Road and Bridge Corporation (CRBC). Aside from the bridge itself, the construction project also includes improving access to the bridge by upgrading and widening Barangka Drive and Pantaleon Street on the Mandaluyong side.

The bridge was briefly closed on September 23, 2018, to prepare for expansion works. However, it was reopened on September 25 due to the anticipated heavy traffic during the Christmas holiday season. Plans for expansion works were moved to January 2019. The bridge's closure started on January 19, 2019. It was met with controversies, citing capacity constraints on the Mandaluyong side landing in a two-lane street and the long project duration originally expected to last 30 months.

The bridge expansion is part of the Build! Build! Build! Infrastructure Program.

On April 23, 2021, DPWH announced the final concrete pouring and completion of the second bridge's substructure and superstructure. The bridge was expected to open in June 2021 but was delayed repeatedly due to the COVID-19 pandemic, among other developments.

President Rodrigo Duterte inaugurated the newly expanded ₱1.46 billion bridge on July 29, 2021, and it was reopened to vehicular traffic on the same day.

== Traffic regulation ==
In September 2015, Cabinet Secretary Jose Rene Almendras announced that the government was looking into implementing a one-way traffic scheme on the Estrella–Pantaleon and Makati–Mandaluyong Bridges.

== See also ==
- List of crossings of the Pasig River
- Media related to Estrella–Pantaleon Bridge at Wikimedia Commons
