= Guadalupe Bridge =

Guadalupe Bridge Tulay ng Guadalupe
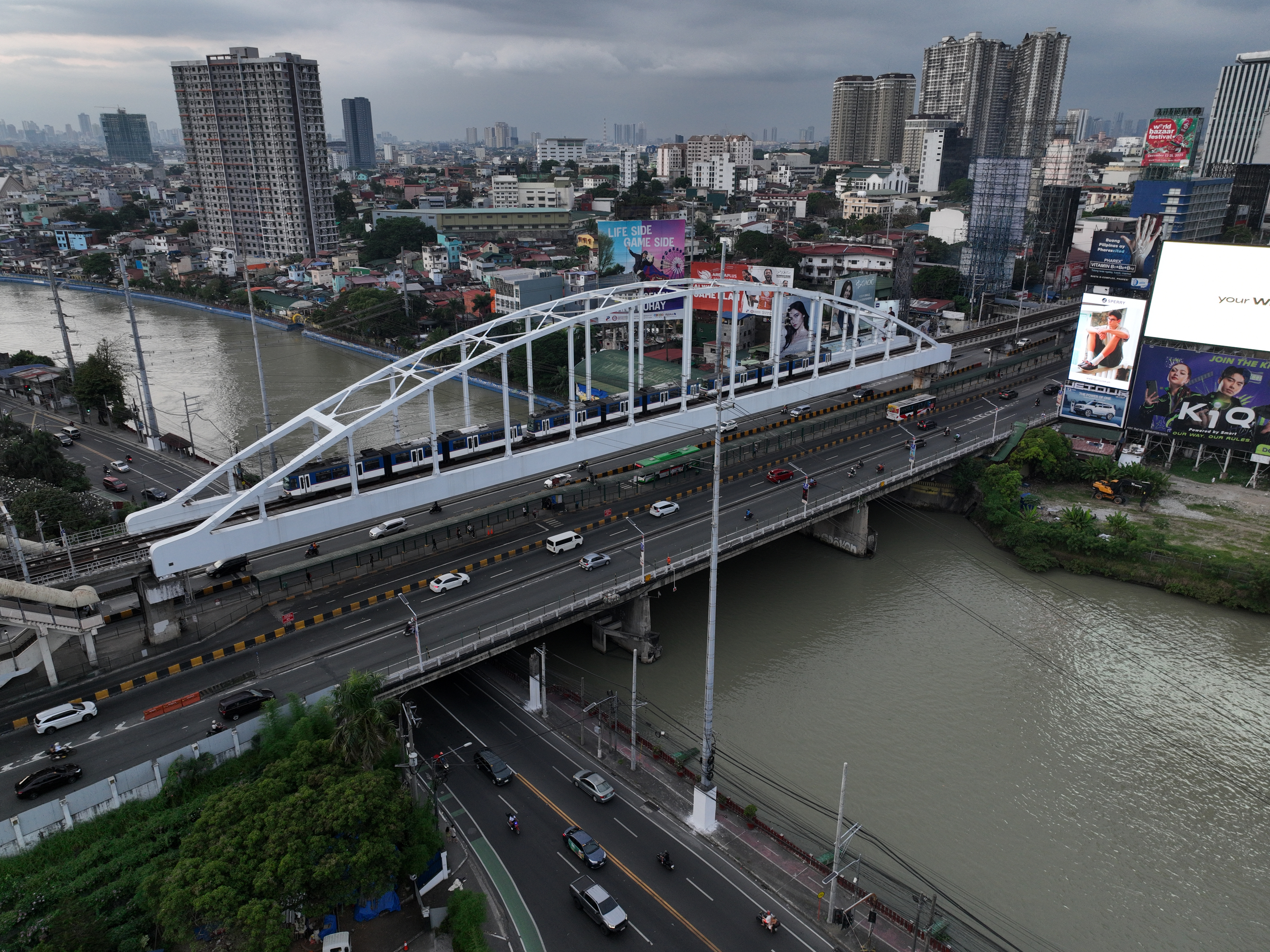
- Drone shot of the Guadalupe Bridge
- Coordinates: 14°34′06.5″N 121°02′45.6″E
- Carries: 10 lanes of AH 26 (N1) (EDSA), vehicular traffic and pedestrians, including 1 EDSA Carousel
- Crosses: Pasig River
- Locale: Guadalupe Viejo and Guadalupe Nuevo, Makati and Buayang Bato and Barangka Ilaya, Mandaluyong, Metro Manila, Philippines
- Maintained by: Department of Public Works and Highways and Metropolitan Manila Development Authority
- Preceded by: Estrella–Pantaleon Bridge
- Followed by: BGC-Ortigas Center Bridge

Characteristics
- Design: Girder bridge (outer bridges); Tied-arch bridge (inner bridge)
- Material: Prestressed and reinforced concrete (Outer bridges); Steel (Inner bridges)
- Total length: Inner bridge: 135 m (443 ft); Outer bridges: 114.44 m (375.5 ft)
- Width: Inner bridge: 9.1 m (30 ft); Outer bridges: 18.7 m (61 ft) each
- Load limit: Outer bridges: 20 metric tons (20 long tons; 22 short tons)
- No. of lanes: 10 (5 per outer bridge)

Rail characteristics
- No. of tracks: Double-track
- Track gauge: 1,435 mm (4 ft 8 1/2 in) standard gauge
- Electrified: Yes; through 750 V DC overhead lines

History
- Constructed by: Umali-Pajara Construction Company (outer bridges); EEI Corporation (inner bridge)
- Construction start: 1962 or 1963
- Construction end: 1966; 1974 (widening); 1979 (two outer lanes)
- Inaugurated: 1999 (inner bridge)

Statistics
- Daily traffic: 220,000 vehicles (2013)

Location
- Interactive map of Guadalupe Bridge

The Guadalupe Bridge is a road bridge crossing the Pasig River in Metro Manila, Philippines, linking the cities of Makati and Mandaluyong. It serves as a conduit for EDSA and the MRT Line 3.

== Background ==
The modern-day Guadalupe Bridge consists of an inner bridge and two outer bridges.

Plans to finalize the then-partially opened Highway 54 (now EDSA) and link the north and south banks of the Pasig River were conceived in the 1950s. The bridge, which has effectively connected the highway's both segments separated by the river, was originally narrow, but it underwent replacement in the 1960s. Construction began in 1962 or 1963 and was finished on November 23, 1966. It was later widened in 1974.

The two outer bridges were constructed in 1979 with Umali-Pajara Construction Company as its general contractor. The length of the bridge from its two abutments is 114.44 meters (375.5 ft). The outer bridges have ten lanes in total, and a junction at the Makati side of the bridge connects to J. P. Rizal Avenue. Each outer bridge is around 18.7 meters (61 ft) in width, has five lanes that are 3.35 meters (11.0 ft) each and a 1.2-meter (3.9 ft) pedestrian sidewalk near the railings. Located on the median of the road bridge is the Guadalupe station of EDSA Carousel, which began operations in 2020.

A separate but unconnected tied-arch rail bridge of the Manila Metro Rail Transit System Line 3 exists above the road bridge. The rail bridge, hovering above the road bridge and constructed by the EEI Corporation, has a length of 135 meters (443 ft) and a width of 9.1 meters (30 ft).

According to a December 2013 report by the Japan International Cooperation Agency (JICA), the Guadalupe Bridge has the highest traffic volume among the 12 main bridges in Metro Manila, with 220,000 vehicles crossing the bridge daily.

== Planned renovation ==
By 2016, the bridge had been identified as one of the structures expected to collapse following a hypothetical strong earthquake in Metro Manila. Major repairs were done on the bridge in 2019.

The outer bridges were replaced by three-span steel deck box girders, while the inner bridge, assessed by JICA to be in good condition, was retrofitted. The pedestrian sidewalk was expanded to 1.5 meters (4.9 ft) while the outer bridges remained at ten lanes in total.

Retrofitting works on the bridge, funded by JICA, were scheduled to begin in October or November 2025, involving a partial closure.

== See also ==
- List of crossings of the Pasig River
