= North–South Harbor Bridge =

- Coordinates: 14°35′44″N 120°57′37″E
- Carries: Motor vehicles, pedestrians and bicycles
- Crosses: Pasig River
- Locale: Manila, Philippines

Characteristics
- Total length: 2,026 m (6,647 ft)
- No. of spans: 3
- No. of lanes: 4

History
- Construction start: May 20, 2026

Location
- Interactive map of North–South Harbor Bridge

The North–South Harbor Bridge is an under-construction cable-stayed bridge that will connect Barangay 20 (Parola) in the North Harbor and Barangay 649 (Baseco Island) in the South Harbor of the Port of Manila. It will cross over the Pasig River and is parallel to the M. Roxas Jr. Bridge (Delpan Bridge).

Civil works were expected to begin in 2021, and the bridge was scheduled to be completed and operational by 2023. It was later pushed back at the end of 2024 or early 2025. However, actual construction began on May 20, 2026.

== Background ==
The bridge was initially submitted as the Robinson Bridge and is a part of the Pasig-Marikina River and Manggahan Floodway Bridges Project, which aims to construct 12 additional bridges to improve transportation in Metro Manila. The three-span prestressed concrete cable-stayed bridge will have four lanes (two lanes per direction) and three-meter sidewalks on both sides. It will have a total length of 2,026 m (6,647 ft), of which 300 m (984 ft) is the main bridge.

Proposals of the bridge received opposition from local officials in Manila, stating that construction of the bridge will displace around 1,249 families and force the demolition of a nearby school. The bridge was also criticized as it was intended for trucking cargo and would form a choke point with a two-lane road. The construction cost of the bridge is ₱6.7 billion.

== Construction ==
Construction of the bridge was planned to start at the end of 2024 or on early 2025. However, groundbreaking was held on May 20, 2026, two years later than its planned construction. Three days later, a fire broke out at a residential area in Parola Compound, displacing 2,134 families. The area that was razed is affected by the right of way of the bridge. The cause of the fire is questionable, as the timing of the fire happened when several developments, including the bridge, are set to start in the area.
