= Mindoro–Batangas Super Bridge =

Bridge connecting Mindoro Island to Batangas Province

- Coordinates: 13.5709078°N 121.0422134°E
- Crosses: Isla Verde Passage
- Official name: Mindoro–Batangas Super Bridge

Characteristics
- Design: pontoon bridge
- Total length: 14 km (8.7 mi)

History
- Construction cost: ₱18 billion (2015 estimate)

Location
- Interactive map of Mindoro–Batangas Super Bridge

The Mindoro–Batangas Super Bridge is a proposed 14 km (8.7 mi) pontoon bridge which is planned to connect the Philippine province of Batangas and Mindoro island.

== History ==
Proposals to construct a bridge to connect Batangas and Mindoro island has been made as early as 2011. The bridge is meant to facilitate easier transport of agricultural goods from Mindoro island to Metro Manila which are usually exported from the island using inter-island vessels. In early 2011, Oriental Mindoro Governor Alfonso Umali Jr. has coordinated with President Benigno Aquino III regarding the conducting a study to construct a bridge in the area. Aquino has delegated Department of Public Works and Highways (DPWH) secretary, Rogelio Singson to start conducting a feasibility study on the bridge within 2011. On December 22, 2011, Umali met with principal Chinese investors in Calapan regarding plans to construct such a bridge. Chinese engineers also conducted a site survey in the area. The bridge is planned to span across the Isla Verde Passage and will cross Verde Island.

The DPWH announced in January 2012 that construction of the bridge will commence in February 2012, Although construction of the bridge did not commence as announced.

=== 2015 developments ===
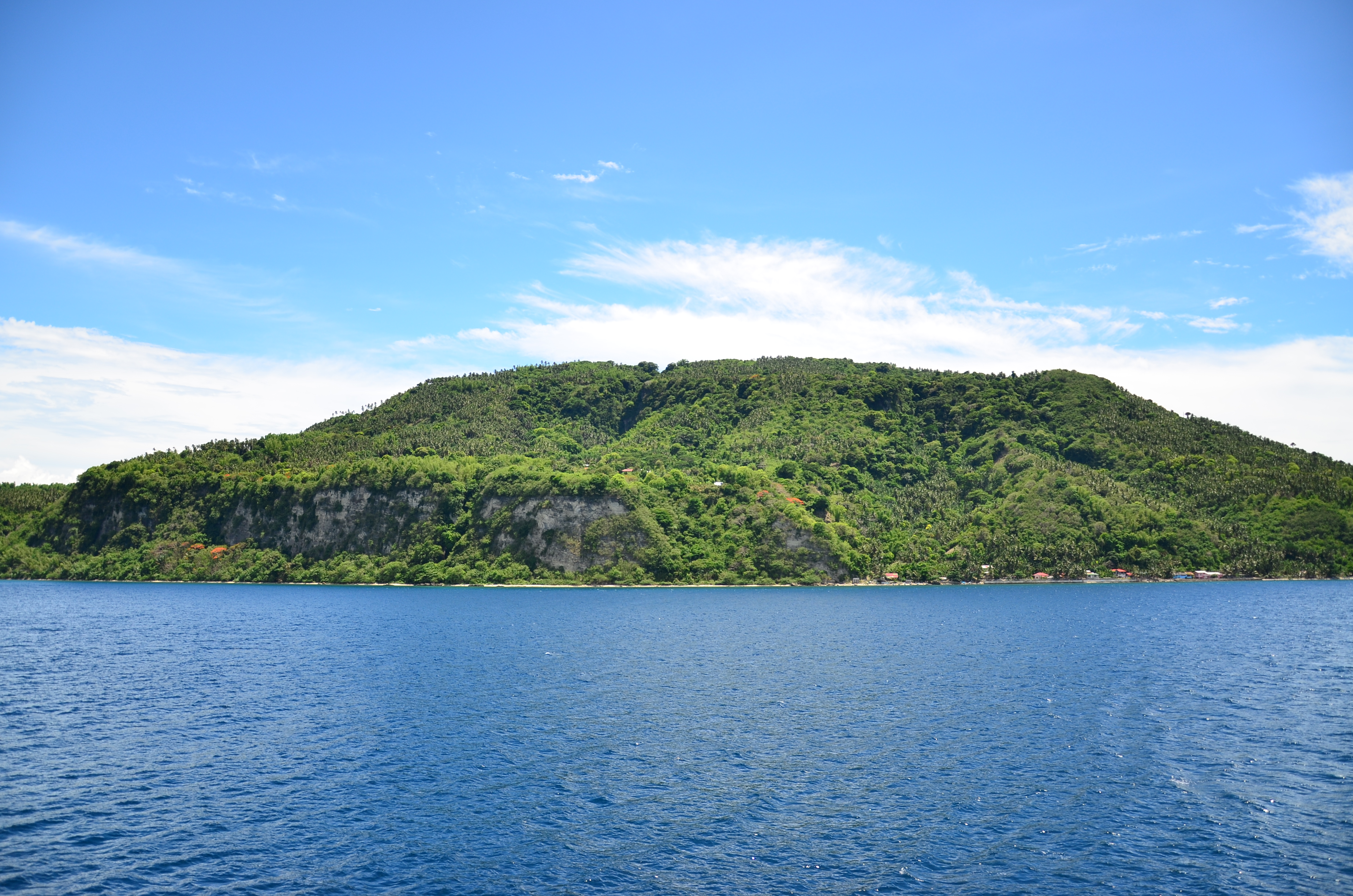
The bridge will cross through Verde island.

San Miguel Corporation first expressed interest to construct the bridge in 2013. In early 2015, a group of Malaysian investors led by Mohammed Jamil expressed interest in the project and is eyeing to import rice from Oriental Mindoro. A floating bridge or pontoon bridge design was adopted to avoid damaging the seabed of the Isla Verde Passage which is considered a "center of biodiversity".

San Miguel Corporation presented a plan for the bridge was presented to Governor Vilma Santos of Batangas and Governor Alfonso Umali Jr. of Oriental Mindoro. The cost of the construction of the 14-kilometer-long (8.7 mi) bridge is ₱18 billion and will take five years to build.

The bridge is planned to span the Isla Verde Passage. The bridge compose of two components. The first will span 6.4 kilometers (4.0 mi) from Barangay Ilijan in Batangas City to Verde Island. The second component spanning 4.4 kilometers (2.7 mi) will continue from Verde Island to Barangay Sinandigan in Puerto Galera, Oriental Mindoro.

The Batangas-Mindoro bridge is touted to be the first floating bridge in Asia with high ship passage on its pontoons. The bridge will have pedestrian and bicycle lanes. The bridge will be also designed to withstand typhoons with winds up to 350 km/h (220 mph).
