= Marcos Highway =

Marcos Highway may refer to any of the following highways in the Philippines formerly named after former President Ferdinand Marcos prior to the People Power Revolution:

- Marikina–Infanta Highway, connecting Marikina to Infanta, Quezon
- Mel Lopez Boulevard (formerly known as Marcos Road and Pres. Ferdinand E. Marcos Highway), a component of Radial Road 10 in Manila
- Aspiras–Palispis Highway (formerly the Agoo–Baguio Road), connecting Agoo, La Union to Baguio
