= Mel Lopez Boulevard =

Major street in Metro Manila, Philippines

Coordinates: 14°37′31″N 120°57′35″E

R-10 Mel Lopez Boulevard

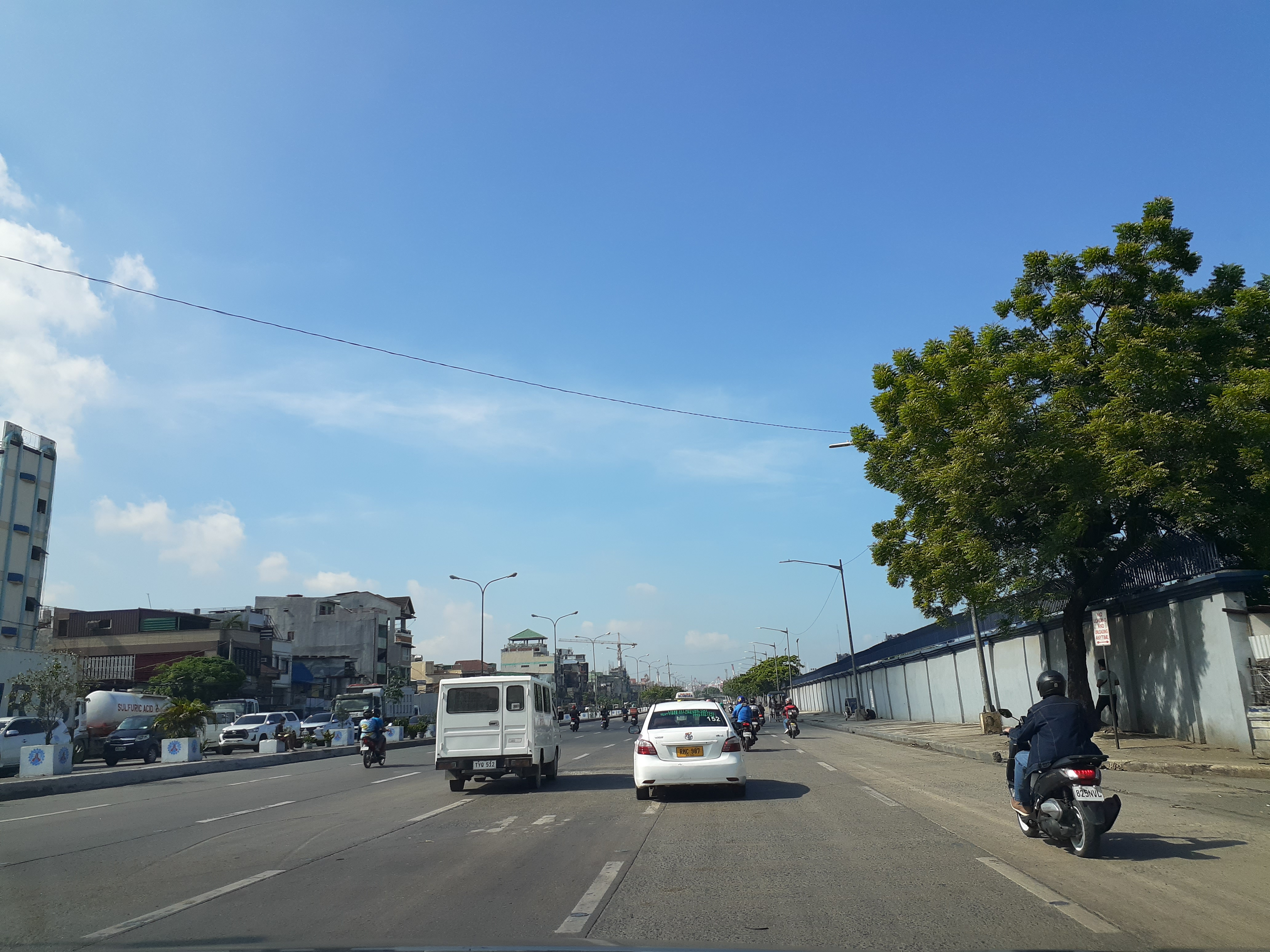
- The boulevard going south

Route information
- Auxiliary route of AH 26 (26)
- Maintained by the Department of Public Works and Highways
- Length: 6.28 km (3.90 mi)
- Existed: 1976–present
- Component highways: AH 26 (N120); R-10 R-10

Major junctions
- North end: Maralla Bridge at the Manila–Navotas boundary
- N140 (Capulong Street); N145 (Recto Avenue)
- South end: Anda Circle in Port Area and Intramuros, Manila

Location
- Country: Philippines
- Major cities: Manila

Highway system
- Roads in the Philippines; Highways; Expressways; List

Mel Lopez Boulevard, formerly known as President Ferdinand E. Marcos Highway or simply as Marcos Road, is a 6.2-kilometer (3.9 mi), six-to-ten-lane divided highway in northern Manila, Philippines, connecting Bonifacio Drive in Port Area and Intramuros in the south with Radial Road 10 (R-10) in Navotas in the north. The highway is the main component of the R-10 network, which runs north of the Pasig River until Anda Circle, and is an extension of Bonifacio Drive, running north–south through the Manila North Port area serving the coastal districts of Tondo and Port Area, as well as San Nicolas and Intramuros. It is also a component of the Pan-Philippine Highway's (Asian Highway 26) auxiliary route through western Metro Manila and of National Route 120 (N120).

The boulevard is named after former Manila Mayor Mel Lopez, who hailed from Tondo, one of the city's districts that it traverses.

== Route description ==
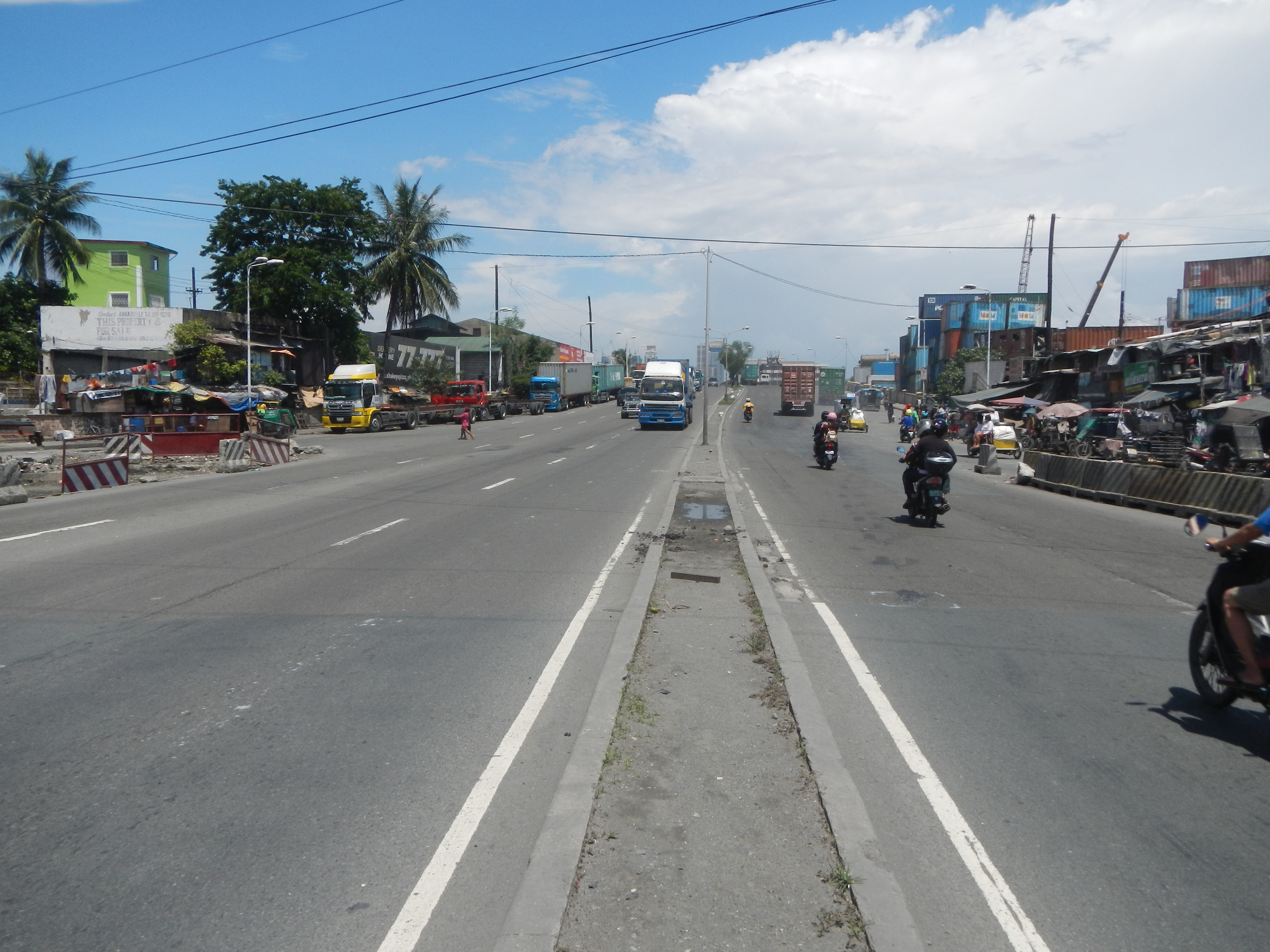
The south end of M. Lopez Flyover looking south towards Pasig River

Mel Lopez Boulevard originates at Anda Circle, the intersection with Andres Soriano Avenue, Bonifacio Drive, and Roberto Oca Street, as a continuation of Bonifacio Drive in the Port Area. It crosses the Pasig River via Roxas Bridge (also known as Mel Lopez Bridge and Del Pan Bridge). It then comes into an intersection with Recto Avenue, Del Pan Street, and MICT South Access Road at the district boundary of San Nicolas and Tondo; traffic passing above is carried by the M. Lopez Flyover. The boulevard then heads northwest toward Pier 4 of the Manila North Harbor before bending north into the Moriones and Don Bosco areas in Tondo. The road passes east of the Manila North Port terminal complex and leaves Barrio Magsaysay for Barrio Vitas past Capulong Street (C-2). Continuing north, it soon crosses over the Estero de Vitas (Vitas Creek) and enters the Balut area of Tondo, where the old dumpsite of Smokey Mountain is located. The boulevard terminates at the Maralla Bridge, which crosses the Estero de Marala (Navotas River).

North of the estero, the boulevard extends into the reclaimed fish port complex of Navotas, running parallel to North Bay Boulevard plainly as Radial Road 10 (R-10), which runs up to Circumferential Road 4 (C-4) above the Tullahan River.

== History ==
The boulevard's section, particularly north of the Pasig River, was built on reclaimed land called Tondo Foreshoreland, reclaimed in the 1950s as part of a government plan to expand and improve port facilities in Manila. It soon became the resettlement site of thousands of urban poor families, which turned the area into what was once Southeast Asia's largest squatter colony. The road itself was also named Dewey Boulevard Extension in the planning stage and was conceived as part of the planned route from Manila to Bataan under the Manila Bay Coastal Road project initiated during the administration of President Ferdinand Marcos. It was later constructed between 1976 and 1979 as part of the Manila Urban Development Project; meanwhile, the Roxas Bridge (also known as Del Pan Bridge and currently the Mel Lopez Bridge), which connects the new road to Bonifacio Drive south of the Pasig River, and a flyover crossing Recto Avenue were built in 1975. The new road occupied the old Vives Street (Spanish: Calle de Vives) in San Nicolas. It was initially named Marcos Road after the sitting president during that time.

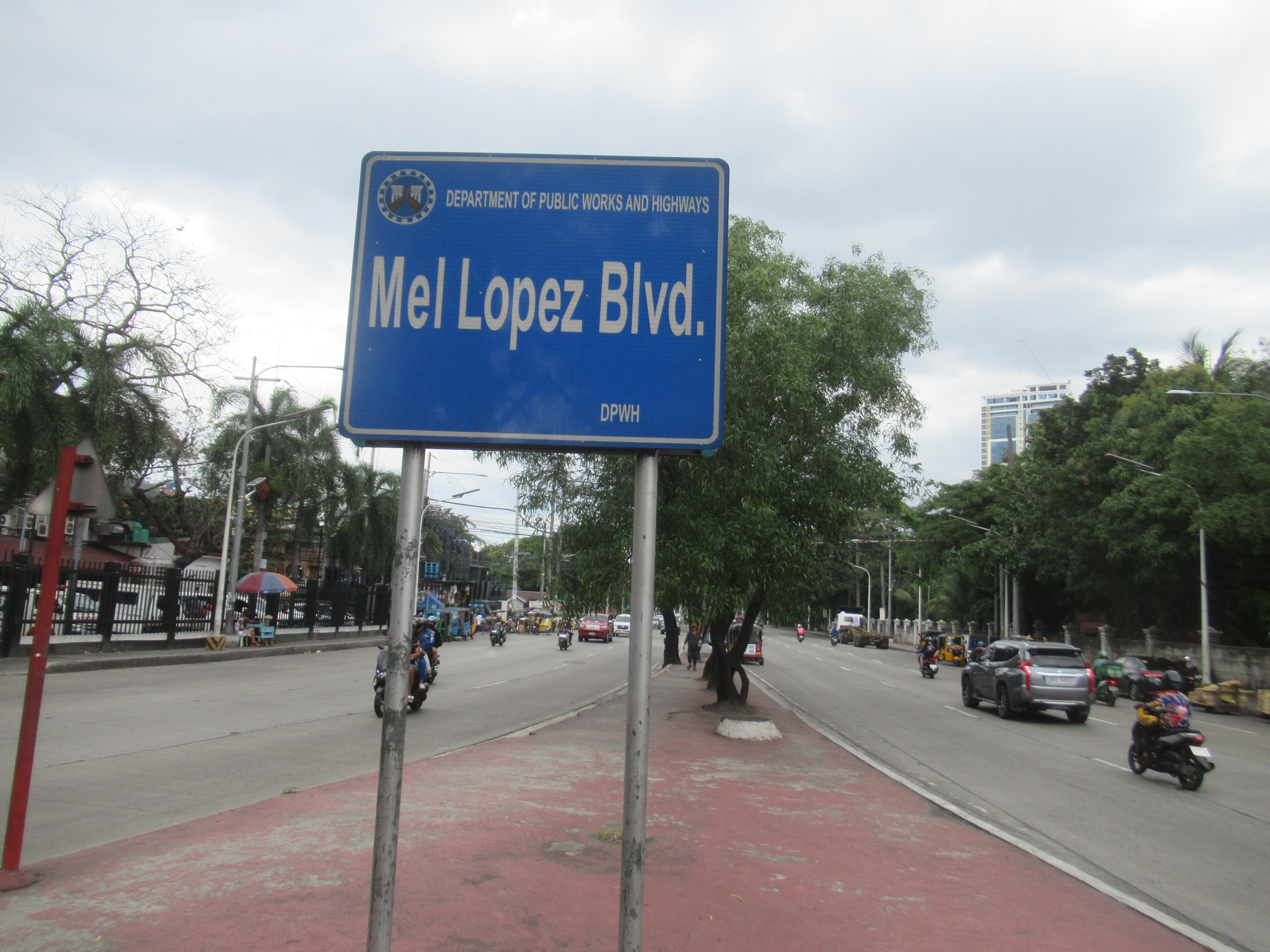
Mel Lopez Boulevard street sign near Anda Circle. The section north of the circle was integrated into the boulevard from Bonifacio Drive in 2019.

In January 2017, a bill was filed by Buhay Party-List Representative and former Manila Mayor Lito Atienza in the Philippine House of Representatives changing the name of this portion of Radial Road 10 to Mayor Gemiliano Lopez Boulevard in honor of the late Manila Mayor Mel Lopez. In April 2019, President Rodrigo Duterte signed Republic Act No. 11280, officially renaming the highway to Mel Lopez Boulevard. With the renaming, the segment of Bonifacio Drive, which is in place since the Spanish colonial era, from Roxas Bridge to Anda Circle became part of Mel Lopez Boulevard.

== Landmarks ==
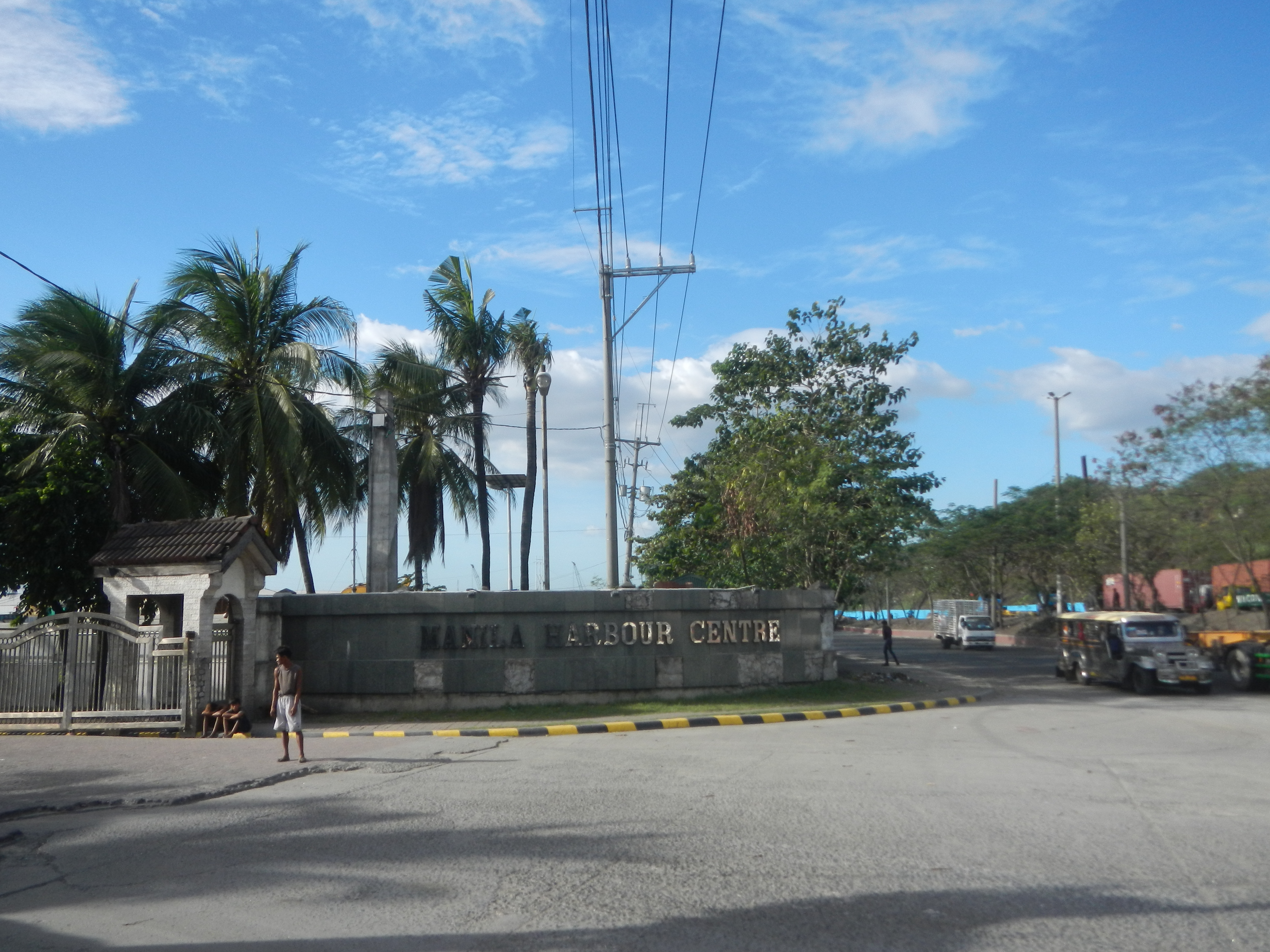
Manila Harbour Centre

This is from south to north, all in Manila:

- Anda Circle
- Philippine Red Cross Port Area
- Club Intramuros Golf Course (Clubhouse)
- Department of Public Works and Highways – South Manila District Engineering Office
- Roxas Bridge (Pasig River)
- Delpan Sports Complex
- Manila North Harbor
- Philippine Ports Authority
- Don Bosco Tondo Church
  - Don Bosco Tondo Football Field
- Amado Hernandez Elementary School
- Vitas Industrial Estate
- Tondominium
- Mel Lopez Bridge (Estero de Vitas)
- Manila Harbour Centre
- Smokey Mountain
