= Paterio Aquino Avenue =

Road in Malabon, Philippines

Coordinates: 14°39′35″N 120°57′19″E

- Letre Road
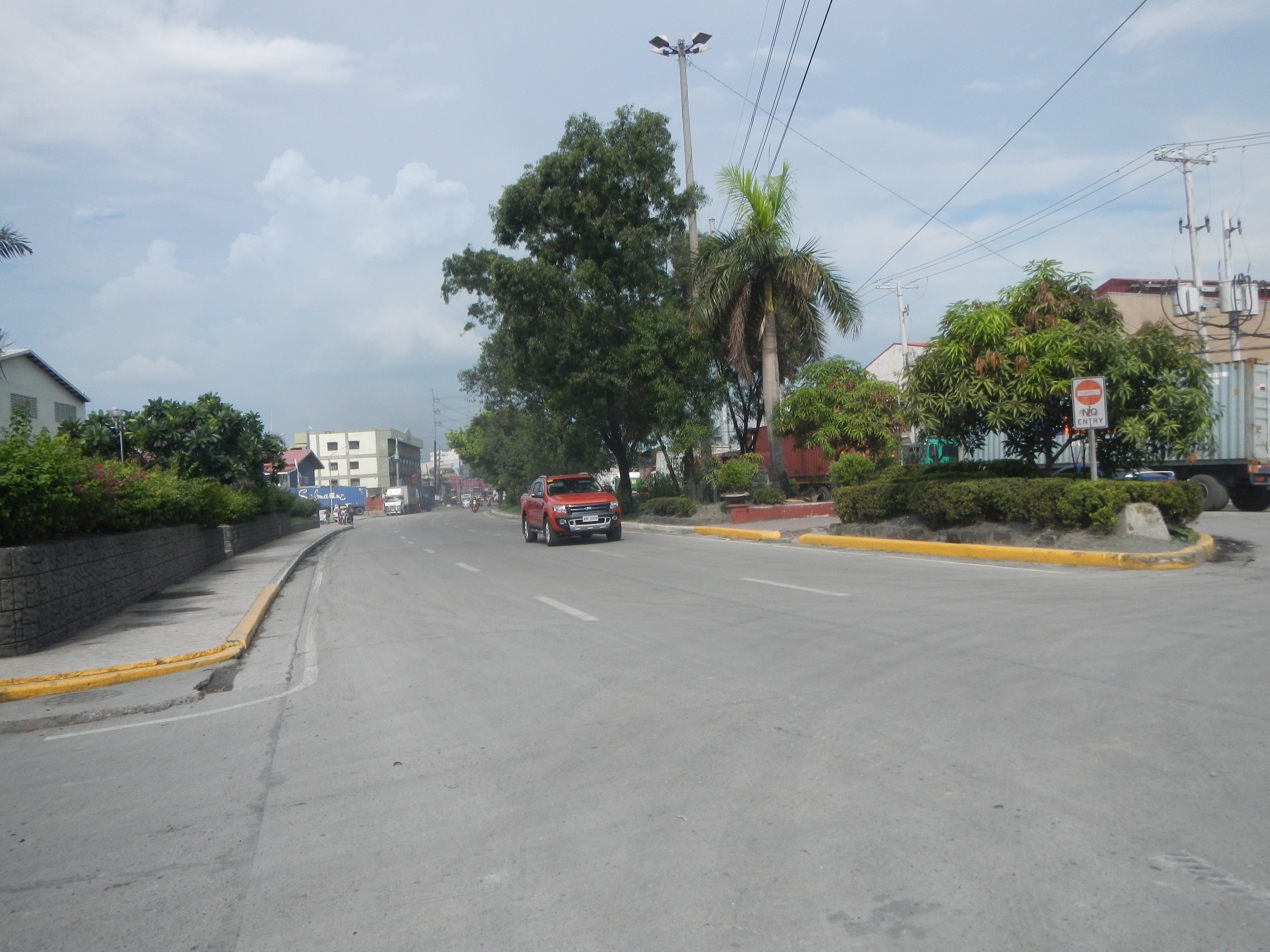
- View of Paterio Aquino Avenue from the junction with C-4 Road
- Interactive map of Paterio Aquino Avenue
- Former name: Manila Circumferential Road
- Length: 1.6 km (0.99 mi)
- Location: Malabon and Caloocan
- East end: AH 26 (N120) (C-4 Road) at Malabon–Caloocan boundary
- West end: Malabon City Hall Roundabout in Malabon

Paterio Aquino Avenue is the main street in Malabon, northern Metro Manila, Philippines. It runs from Caloocan, beginning at the intersection with C-4 Road and terminating at F. Sevilla Boulevard at the Malabon City Hall roundabout. It is named for Paterio Aquino, who served as municipal mayor of Malabon from 1946 to 1951 and from 1956 to 1959. The street is sometimes called Letre Road after the old barrio in Malabon through which it passes. The section west of Tonsuya Bridge in Barangays San Agustin and Tañong in Malabon is alternatively named Rizal Avenue Extension.

The six-lane undivided street houses several notable Malabon establishments, including the Malabon City Hall, San Bartolome Church, St. James Academy, Our Lady of Lourdes Cemetery, and Pescadores Restaurant. The Metropolitan Manila Development Authority included it on the list of the metropolis's most flood-prone areas.

From the 1940s to the 1950s, the street was part of the Manila Circumferential Road (Route 54 / Highway 54).
