= North Bay Boulevard =

Main road in Navotas, Philippines

Coordinates: 14°38′35″N 120°57′16″E

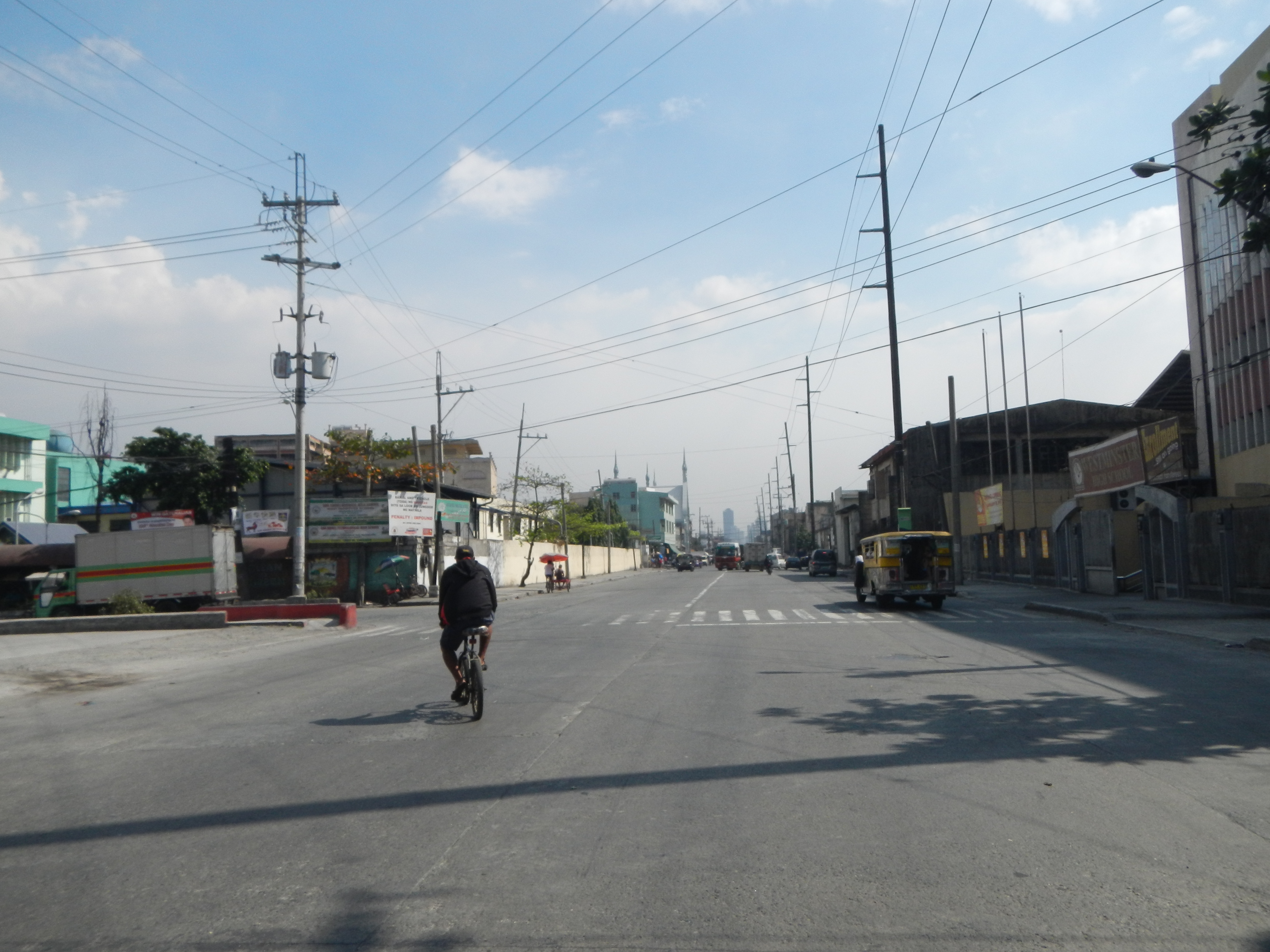
- North Bay Boulevard southbound towards Tondo
- Interactive map of North Bay Boulevard
- Maintained by: Department of Public Works and Highways - Malabon-Navotas District Engineering Office
- Length: 2.34 km (1.45 mi)
- Location: Navotas
- North end: AH 26 (N120) (C-4 Road) / Mariano Naval Street in Bagumbayan South & Bagumbayan North
- Major junctions: Lapu-Lapu Avenue; N130 (C-3 Road)
- South end: Honorio Lopez Boulevard in San Rafael Village

North Bay Boulevard is a 2.34-kilometer-long (1.45 mi) two-to-four-lane access road in the Navotas Fish Port Complex of northern Metro Manila, Philippines. It is one of the main roads in Navotas, which travels north-south through the southern parts of the city, running parallel to Radial Road 10 (R-10) to the west. The road links the Balut area of Tondo in Manila and San Rafael Village in the south to the central Navotas barangay of Bagumbayan South in the north. It was named after its location in Manila Bay, north of the Manila North Harbor complex.

== Route description ==
North Bay Boulevard continues from Honorio Lopez Boulevard from Tondo, Manila. From the Balut–Navotas Bridge south over the Estero de Sunog Apog, it travels northwest, and upon crossing Circumferential Road 3 (C-3), it curves north-northwest and continues in that direction until it reaches Pescador II Street in Bangkulasi village. Between C-3 Road and Pescador II Street, the road forms the boundary between the barangays Northbay Boulevard North and Northbay Boulevard South. It thus runs in parallel to Radial Road 10 (R-10). The road continues for a few hundred meters through Bangkulasi until it terminates at the Bagumbayan Bridge over the Bangkulasi Channel.

The road continues north of the Bangkulasi Channel as Mariano Naval Street, which heads to San Jose (poblacion) and through the remaining parts of northern Navotas.

A notable site along the boulevard is the Navotas Agora Complex, a popular marketplace. The road is also the location of many shipping line warehouses, including Philippine Span Asia Carrier Corporation and Solid Shipping Lines Corporation.

== History ==
North Bay Boulevard used to refer to the road segment from Juan Luna Street in Tondo, Manila to San Rafael Village, Navotas (formerly a municipality in the province of Rizal), presently known as Honorio Lopez Boulevard, since 1967. It was later extended to an artificial island called the Navotas Fish Port Complex, the biggest and oldest fish port in the Philippines. It was reclaimed in 1977 during the Marcos administration. The island is bounded on the north by the Bangkulasi Channel, on the east by the Malabon Channel, on the south by Estero de Sunog Apog (Sunog Apog Creek), and on the west by Manila Bay. The 47.5-hectare (117-acre) land became a resettlement site for many urban poor families from Tondo and is now administratively divided into three barangays, namely Bangkulasi, Northbay Boulevard North, and Northbay Boulevard South, the city's largest with a population in 2010 of 68,375.
