= Metropolitan Manila Development Authority =

Philippine government agency

Metropolitan Manila Development Authority Pangasiwaan sa Pagpapaunlad ng Kalakhang Maynila (Filipino)
- Abbreviation: MMDA
- Motto: Marangal, Matapat, Disiplinado Ako "[I am] Honorable, Honest, and Disciplined"

Agency overview
- Formed: November 5, 1975; 51 years ago
- Annual budget: ₱4.78 billion (2020)

Jurisdictional structure
- Operations jurisdiction: Philippines
- Legal jurisdiction: National Capital Region
- Specialist jurisdiction: Highways, roads, traffic

Operational structure
- Headquarters: MMDA Building, Doña Julia Vargas Avenue cor. Molave Street, Ugong, Pasig, Metro Manila, Philippines
- Traffic enforcers: 2,158 (March 2018)
- Agency executives: Atty. Romando S. Artes, Chairperson; Usec. Frisco S. San Juan Jr., Deputy Chairperson; Usec. Nicolas Torre III, General Manager and Spokesperson
- Parent agency: Office of the President of the Philippines

Website
- www.mmda.gov.ph

Map of Metro Manila

The Metropolitan Manila Development Authority (MMDA; Filipino: Pangasiwaan sa Pagpapaunlad ng Kalakhang Maynila) is a government agency of the Philippines responsible for constituting the regional government of Metro Manila, comprising the capital city of Manila, the cities of Quezon City, Caloocan, Pasay, Mandaluyong, Makati, Pasig, Marikina, Muntinlupa, Las Piñas, Parañaque, Valenzuela, Malabon, Taguig, Navotas and San Juan, and the municipality of Pateros.

The MMDA is under the direct supervision of the Office of the President of the Philippines. It performs planning, monitoring and coordinative functions, and in the process exercises regulatory and supervisory authority over the delivery of metro-wide services within Metro Manila without diminution of the autonomy of the local government units concerning purely local matters.

The agency is headed by a chairman, who is appointed by, and continues to hold office at the discretion of, the President of the Philippines. The chairman is vested with the rank, rights, privileges, disqualifications, and prohibitions of a cabinet member.

== History ==
=== Establishment of Metro Manila ===
The former MMDA headquarters along EDSA and Orense Street in Makati

On November 7, 1975, President Ferdinand Marcos issued Presidential Decree No. 824 creating Metro Manila and its managing public corporation, the Metropolitan Manila Commission (MMC) after the residents of the affected cities and municipalities approved the creation of Metro Manila in a referendum held on February 27, 1975. The move consolidated the Philippine capital Manila and adjacent Quezon City with two cities and twelve municipalities of the province of Rizal and one municipality of the province of Bulacan into Metro Manila and designated Metro Manila as the national capital region of the Philippines. Marcos appointed his wife, First Lady Imelda Marcos, as governor and Ismael Mathay Jr. as vice governor. November 7, thus, is marked as the anniversary of both the region and the government body that supervises it, the MMDA.

On May 29, 1976, President Ferdinand Marcos issued Presidential Decree No. 940, restoring the City of Manila as the capital city of the Philippines, and designating Metro Manila as the permanent seat of national government.

The MMC became effectively defunct when on January 9, 1990, President Corazon Aquino issued Executive Order No. 392, in accordance to Article 18, Section 8 of the 1987 Philippine Constitution which replaced the commission with the Metropolitan Manila Authority (MMA). The Metro Manila mayors will choose from themselves as chairman. Jejomar Binay of the municipality of Makati served as its first chairman. The agency transferred to its office at the intersection of Epifanio de los Santos Avenue (EDSA) and Orense Street in Guadalupe Nuevo, Makati. Binay was followed by Ignacio Bunye of the municipality of Muntinlupa in 1991, Ismael Mathay Jr. of Quezon City in 1992 then Prospero Oreta of the municipality of Malabon in 1994.

Since the elected chairman is one of the mayors of Metro Manila, the role to their constituency gave less attention. Thus, the Congress of the Philippines, composed of the Senate and the House of Representatives, passed Republic Act No. 7924 creating the Metropolitan Manila Development Authority (MMDA) on March 1, 1995. President Fidel V. Ramos appointed former Malabon mayor Prospero Oreta, who did not run in the Malabon municipal election, as the first Chairman of the MMDA in May 1995 and made him independent of the Metro Manila mayors.

=== Current developments ===
In August 2017, the MMDA has adopted the use of a black beret in order to improve its public image. The berets are used by the traffic enforcers under the agency, which alternate these with a black baseball cap.

On May 23, 2022, President Rodrigo Duterte inaugurated the new headquarters of the MMDA at the intersection of Doña Julia Vargas Avenue and Molave Street in Ugong, Pasig. The building was initially conceptualized by a collaboration between former MMDA Chairman Danilo Lim and the Makati chapter of the United Architects of the Philippines in 2018, with the conceptual design being done by architect Daryl Van Abaygar and was constructed by the Robinsons Land Corporation.

== Divisions ==
- Highway Patrol Division also part of the Traffic Enforcement Division
- Road Emergency Group
- Traffic Enforcement Division
- Traffic Engineering Center
- Towing Services

== Metro Manila Council ==
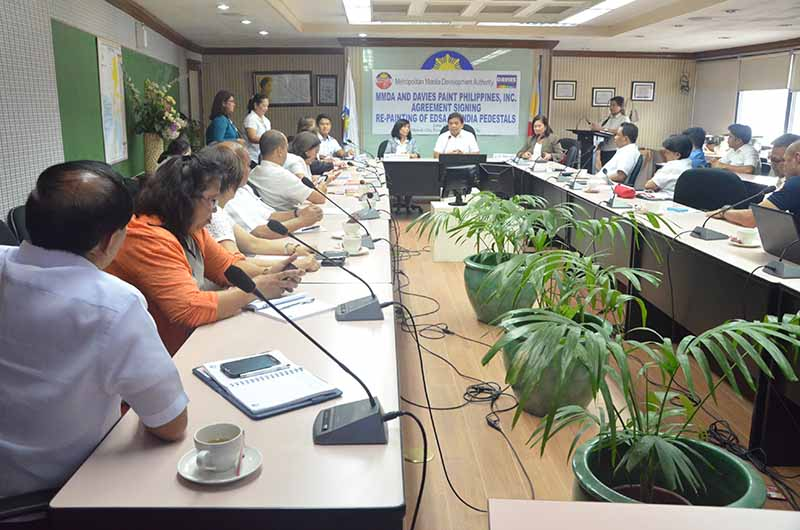
A meeting of the Metro Manila Council in June 2016.

The governing board and policy making body of the MMDA is the Metro Manila Council, composed of the mayors of the cities and municipalities.

The heads of the Department of Transportation (DOTr), Department of Public Works and Highways (DPWH), Department of Tourism (DOT), Department of Budget and Management (DBM), Department of Human Settlements and Urban Development (DHSUD), and Philippine National Police-National Capital Region Police Office (PNP-NCRPO) or their duly authorized representatives, attend meetings of the council as non-voting members.

The council is the policy-making body of the MMDA.

- It approves metro-wide plans, programs and projects and issues rules, regulations and resolutions deemed necessary by the MMDA.
- It may increase the rate of the allowances and per diems of the members of the council to be effective during the term of the succeeding Council. It fixes the compensation of the officers and personnel of the MMDA, and approves the annual budget thereof for submission to the Department of Budget and Management (DBM).
- It promulgates rules and regulations and sets policies and standards for metro-wide application governing the delivery of basic services, prescribes and collects service and regulatory fees, and imposes and collects fines and penalties.

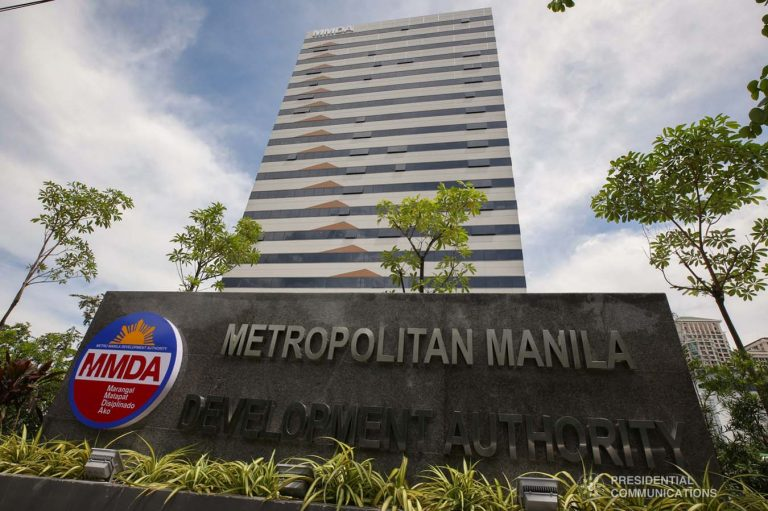
The 20-story Metropolitan Manila Development Authority Head Office in Pasig, which opened in 2022

=== Current Metro Manila Council members ===
Members of the Metro Manila Council (2025–2028)
MMDA Chairman (presiding officer)
Secretary Romando S. Artes
Mayors
Mayor	Locality
Along Malapitan	Caloocan
April Aguilar	Las Piñas
Nancy Binay	Makati
Jeannie Sandoval	Malabon
Carmelita Abalos	Mandaluyong
Isko Moreno	Manila (proper)
Marjorie Ann Teodoro	Marikina
Ruffy Biazon	Muntinlupa
John Rey Tiangco	Navotas
Edwin Olivarez	Parañaque
Emi Rubiano	Pasay
Vico Sotto	Pasig
Gerald German	Pateros
Joy Belmonte	Quezon City
Francis Zamora	San Juan
Lani Cayetano	Taguig
Wes Gatchalian	Valenzuela

The council consists of voting and non-voting members. Voting members are the mayors of the localities in Metro Manila, as well as the Presidents of the Metro Manila Vice Mayors League and the Metro Manila Councilors League. Non-voting members are representatives by the following who serve as council members ex-officio:

- Department of Budget and Management
- Department of Tourism
- Department of Transportation
- Department of Public Works and Highways
- Department of Human Settlements and Urban Development
- and the Philippine National Police National Capital Region Police Office

== Transport and traffic management ==
=== Traffic jurisdiction ===
The MMDA has exclusive authority to enforce traffic laws, rules and regulations, and that the local government units in Metro Manila may participate only when their own traffic enforcers are deputized by the agency. Furthermore, MMDA has traffic jurisdiction over Metro Manila's ten radial roads, five circumferential roads and other roads it may include to enforce traffic laws and traffic management activities. However, the MMDA has route designations for radial roads and circumferential roads different from the route classifications of the Department of Public Works and Highways due to the MMDA's focus on only major roads and thoroughfares.

==== Radial roads ====
- R-1 Roxas Boulevard (Recto Avenue to NAIA Road)
- R-2 Taft Avenue (Lawton to Redemptorist Road)
- R-3 Osmeña Highway (Quirino Avenue to Sales Interchange)
- R-4 Shaw Boulevard, Victorino Mapa Street, and Paula Sanchez Street (Magsaysay Boulevard to Pasig Boulevard)
- R-5 Ortigas Avenue (Bonny Serrano Avenue to Pasig-Cainta border)
- R-6 Aurora Boulevard and Magsaysay Boulevard (Legarda Street to Katipunan Avenue)
- R-7 España Boulevard, Quezon Avenue, and Commonwealth Avenue (Carlos Palangca to Mindanao Avenue)
- R-8 Andres Bonifacio Avenue (Blumentritt Road to Balintawak Interchange)
- R-9 Rizal Avenue (Carriedo Street to Bonifacio Monument)
- R-10 Radial Road 10 (Recto Avenue to Circumferential Road 4)

==== Circumferential roads ====
- C-1 Recto Avenue (Roxas Boulevard to Legarda Street)
- C-2 Lacson Avenue and Quirino Avenue (Roxas Boulevard to Radial Road 10)
- C-3 Gregorio Araneta Avenue and Sergeant Rivera Avenue (N. Domingo Street to Radial Road 10)
- C-4 Circumferential Road 4 (Radial Road 10 to Macapagal Boulevard)
- C-5 Circumferential Road 5 (Commonwealth Avenue to Mindanao Avenue)
- C-6 Laguna Lake Highway

==== Other major thoroughfares ====
- A. Mabini Street (Samson Road to C-3 Road)
- Alabang–Zapote Road (Alabang to Quirino Avenue)
- MacArthur Highway (Bonifacio Monument to Valenzuela-Meycauayan border)
- Marikina–Infanta Highway (Katipunan Avenue to Sumulong Highway)

=== Pasig River Ferry ===
Since 2014, the agency took over the mothballed Pasig River ferry system in anticipation of huge traffic along the metropolis, from the Skyway Stage 3 construction. In reviving the defunct transportation, many of the old ferry stations were reactivated and new vessels purchased. Ridership of the waterway service increased over time since the agency's takeover, with the offering of discounts to students and senior citizens, until these were made totally free of charge. The MMDA intends to continue operating the ferry service until a private investor takes over.

=== No Physical Contact Policy ===
Since 2003, the MMDA has implemented a No Contact Apprehension Policy in apprehending traffic violators in Metro Manila using traffic enforcement cameras and closed-circuit television to capture violators without the presence of an on-site traffic enforcer.

=== Mabuhay Lane ===
To ease traffic congestion on main roads in Metro Manila, the MMDA under Chairman Francis Tolentino launched Christmas Lanes, marking 17 alternative routes for motorists during the Christmas season of 2014. Since then, they have been renamed as year-round Mabuhay Lane, designating alternative routes on roads that should be cleared of obstructions at all times. This was underscored by strict parking restrictions, where parked motor vehicles along these priority roads would be immediately towed.

=== Illegal Parking and Towing ===
The MMDA is tasked to clear obstructions from the roads at all times, and conducts daily clearing operations against stalled and illegally parked vehicles, with subcontracted towing companies. Illegally parked vehicles will be given 5 minutes to leave, and will be towed otherwise. Incapacitated vehicles are almost immediately towed to clear traffic.

Primary and secondary roads, unless with designated parking areas, are considered "No-Parking-Zones".

=== No left turn scheme ===
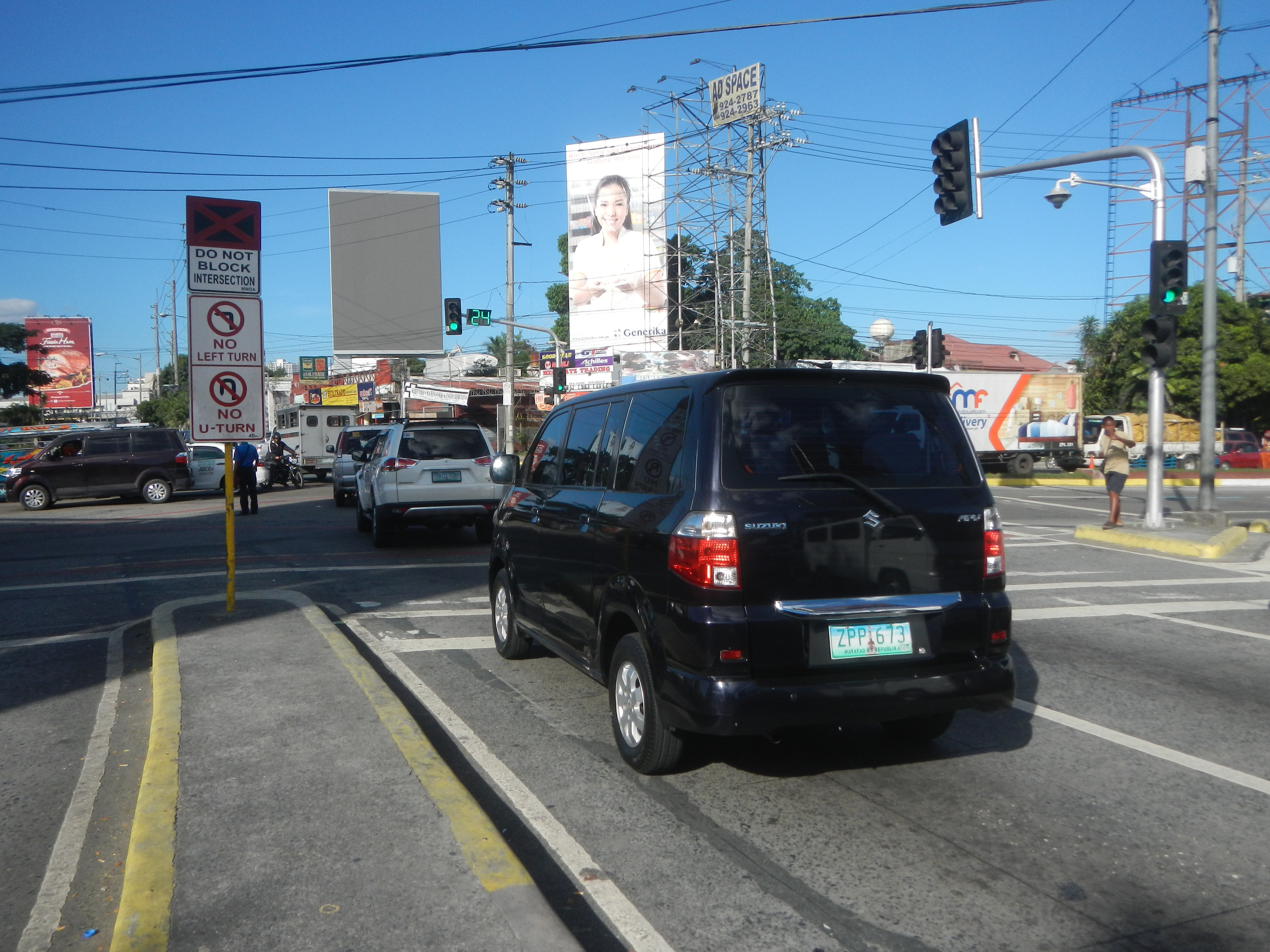
A no left-turn scheme at the intersection of Bonny Serrano Avenue and Katipunan Avenue (part of Circumferential Road 5) in Quezon City, Metro Manila.

The MMDA under Bayani Fernando implemented a "no left-turn" scheme in the early 2000s along several major roads in Metro Manila, prohibiting motor vehicle traffic from turning left at intersections and instead requiring them to make a U-turn at designated U-turn slots and making a right turn after. These U-turn slots were designed to mimic the Michigan left turn design by creating continuous traffic, mitigating bottlenecks caused by traffic light signals.

The scheme was controversial due to longer travel time and difficulties in navigating to these U-turn slots. Several academic studies also summarized that the "no left-turn" design was only beneficial under low traffic conditions and minimal lane changing, as the U-turn slots also became congested themselves. Following the end of Fernando's term, many of these U-turn slots were closed and left-turning at most intersections was restored, although some still remain along roads such as EDSA, Quezon Avenue, and Circumferential Road 5.

== Flood control and sewerage management ==
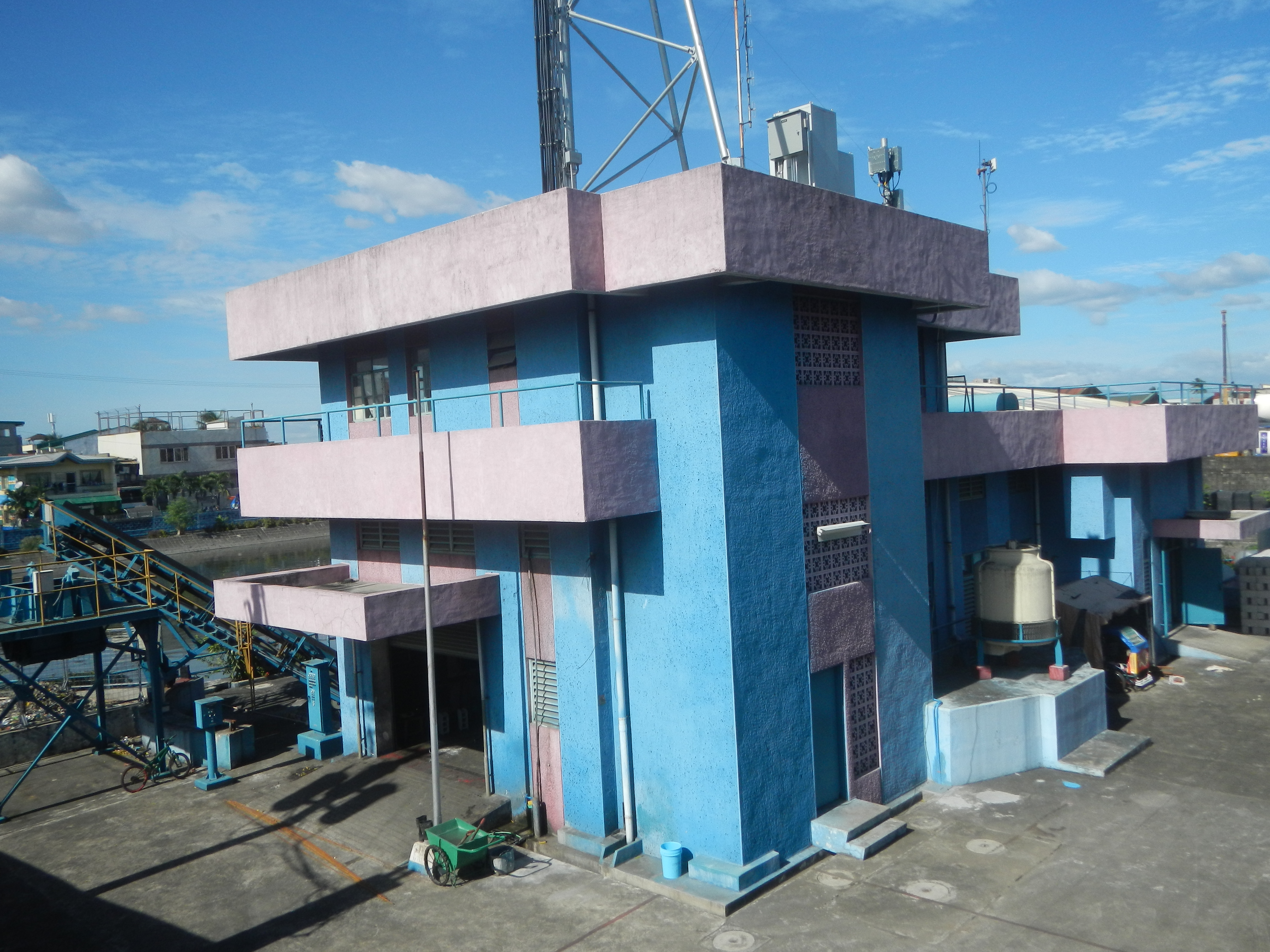
Balut Pumping Station in Manila

=== Pumping Stations ===
MMDA operates and maintains 73 pumping stations across Metro Manila, and the agency has 11 mobile pumps.

=== Waterway dredging ===
Starting with Bayani Fernando's tenure, the Estero Blitz (Waterway Blitz) became an annual waterway clearing operation with emphasis on river dredging activities, particularly at flood-prone areas, to reduce the risk and impact of flooding all over the metropolis. The clearing operation is usually conducted during the dry summer season.

== Urban renewal, zoning, and land use planning, and shelter services ==
=== Adopt-a-park ===
The adopt-a-park program seeks to use underutilized open spaces and turn it into functional parks and rehabilitate underutilized parks within Metro Manila, in cooperation with local government units. There are 17 identified open spaces around the metropolis that is planned to be develop.

I Love Metro Manila Adopt-a-Park Project
Park name	Image	Location	Inauguration	Ref.
Buting Linear Park		San Joaquin, Pasig	2022	
Navotas Green Zone Park		North Bay Boulevard North, Navotas	2025	
MMDA-Valenzuela Friendship Park		Disiplina Village, Bignay, Valenzuela	2022	
Roxas Boulevard Promenande		Roxas Boulevard, Libertad Channel, Metpark, Bay City, Pasay	2024	
Urban Green Space and Recreational Park		Bayanan Baywalk, Bayanan, Muntinlupa	2022	

=== Footbridges ===
The MMDA has built 140 footbridges across Metro Manila. However, some of these footbridges have been criticized such as the Kamuning Footbridge, whose steep height have made it inconvenient to the public and inaccessible to people with disabilities, senior citizens, pregnant women, and children. The footbridge has since been demolished and was replaced with a new one whose design is more accessible and convenient to users.

== Health and security ==
=== Public health ===
The agency supports the campaign against tobacco use and exposure to second-hand smoke. Aside from promotion and public awareness, MMDA also provides technical assistance to the local government units to develop policies, communication strategies, capacity building, and monitoring of compliance.

=== Public safety ===
The MMDA has no police powers and the agency's function is purely administrative.

A first metro-wide earthquake drill was conducted on July 30, 2015, to prepare the public in the event of a magnitude 7.2 earthquake. Various government agencies, educational institutions and the private sector participated in the drill spearheaded by the Metropolitan Manila Development Authority (MMDA). Different scenarios were re-enacted to simulate a destructive earthquake that is expected to happen when the 100-kilometer (62 mi) West Valley Fault moves. Buoyed by its success the MMDA has since hosted annual regional drills for the capital.

== Discontinued programs and projects ==
=== Gwapotel ===
The Gwapotel was a hotel chain run by the MMDA. The first Gwapotel opened on 2007 in Port Area, Manila, and was a big hit to transients due to its affordability and safety. Another branch of the hotel was opened along Abad Santos Avenue in Tondo, Manila in 2008, which operates as a capsule hotel. However, the second branch closed in 2011 due to low occupancy. In 2015, the Port Area hotel was renovated and more amenities and facilities were added. However, just a year later, the hotel deteriorated badly. The hotel was finally closed in 2017, citing outdated building standards which deemed it unsafe.

=== Public urinals ===
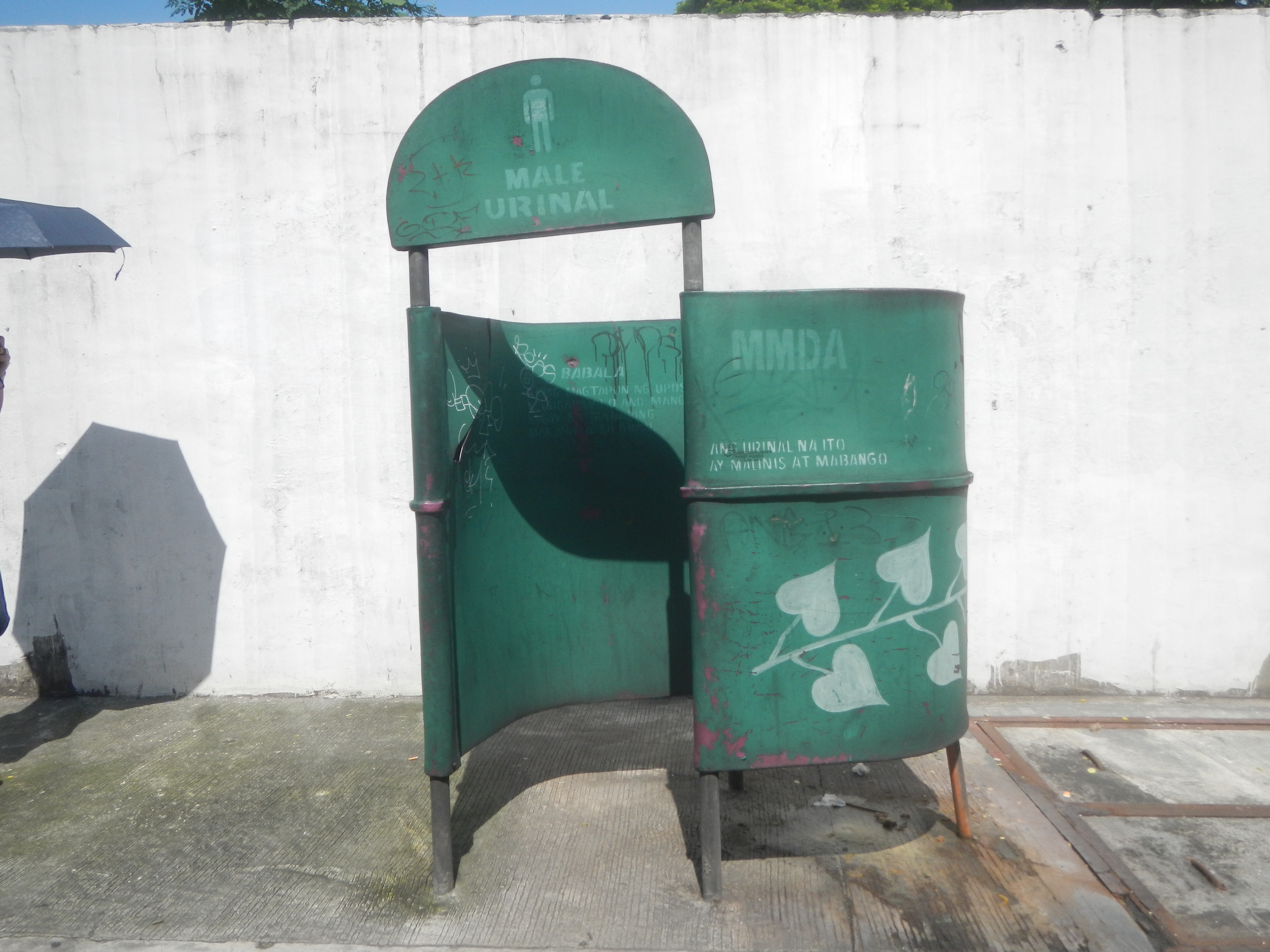
An MMDA public urinal

A short-lived curiosity all around Metro Manila is the pink urinals made popular by then-MMDA Chairman Bayani Fernando, which he implemented prominently in Marikina in an effort to curb public urination. They have since been removed, however, with remaining urinal units distributed instead to local government units. The project drew mixed reactions from the public, and many male motorists and commuters find it useful, while others view it as an unsanitary booth were men are encourage to relieve in public.

=== TV and radio stations ===
The agency formerly had a TV and radio stations known as the MMDA Teleradyo. They ceased operations on August 17, 2010. The MMDA Traffic Radio broadcasts traffic updates, and it started as a test broadcast on September 24, 2007. Meanwhile, the MMDA TV broadcasts traffic updates via live feed by monitoring cameras along the highways and streets, with simulcast over MMDA Traffic Radio 1206. It was started as a test broadcast on August 20, 2008. To compensate for the closure of these communication mediums, the MMDA turned to social media such as Facebook and Twitter to broadcast traffic updates to users following them. Live billboards, particularly at EDSA, have been also constructed. The MMDA app for iOS and Android have also been made available for free, broadcasting traffic updates directly.

== Criticisms ==
In the past, such practices were justified by rhetoric that street children need to be 'rescued' from the street. Advocacy groups contend that in seeking to create a beautiful metropolis, the MMDA often treat Metro Manila's urban poor like 'rubbish' on the street.

A report from PREDA that was funded by UNICEF, claims inhumane proceedings to caught vagrants.

In 2018, the MMDA constructed the Kamuning Footbridge, a pedestrian footbridge connecting Scout Borromeo Street and NIA South Road in Quezon City. The footbridge has been the subject of ridicule since its construction due to its steep height and the agency's responses defending it as "prioritizing safety over convenience" and "only for the able-bodied". As of 2025, the footbridge is planned to be rebuilt by the Department of Transportation to be more inclusive and convenient for road users and commuters.

== See also ==
- Capital City Authority
- Department of Transportation
- Department of Public Works and Highways
- Department of Tourism
- Department of Budget and Management
- Department of Public Works and Highways
- Department of Human Settlements and Urban Development
- Philippine National Police
- Metro Manila
- Office of the President
- Pasig river rehabilitation
- Metro Manila Dream Plan
