= MMDA TV =

Defunct Television channel in the Philippines

MMDA TeleRadyo (MMDA TV)
- Country: Philippines
- Broadcast area: Defunct
- Network: Metropolitan Manila Development Authority

Programming
- Picture format: 480i (SDTV)

History
- Launched: August 20, 2008
- Closed: August 17, 2010

MMDA TeleRadyo was the official radio program of the Metropolitan Manila Development Authority. It gave traffic updates and news about the agency together through its radio station DWAN. The studios and facilities were located at EDSA, Makati. It was aired on channel 4 on Global Destiny Cable (now Destiny Cable).

MMDA TeleRadyo and DWAN-AM permanently ceased operations on August 17, 2010, in order to cost-cutting measures.

== See also ==
- DWAN
- Metropolitan Manila Development Authority
- DZRH News Television
- One PH
- DZMM TeleRadyo
- GMA News TV (defunct)
- Inquirer 990 Television (defunct)
