= Capital City Authority =

Capital City Authority may refer to:

- Capital Development Authority, a government agency in Bangladesh
- Capital Development Authority, a government agency in Pakistan
- Federal Capital Development Authority, a government agency in Nigeria
- Kampala Capital City Authority, a government agency in Uganda
- Metropolitan Manila Development Authority, a government agency in the Philippines
- National Capital Authority, a government agency in Australia
- Nusantara Capital City Authority, a government agency in Indonesia
