= Valenzuela station =

Former station on the Northrail line of the Philippine National Railways (PNR)

West Valenzuela station
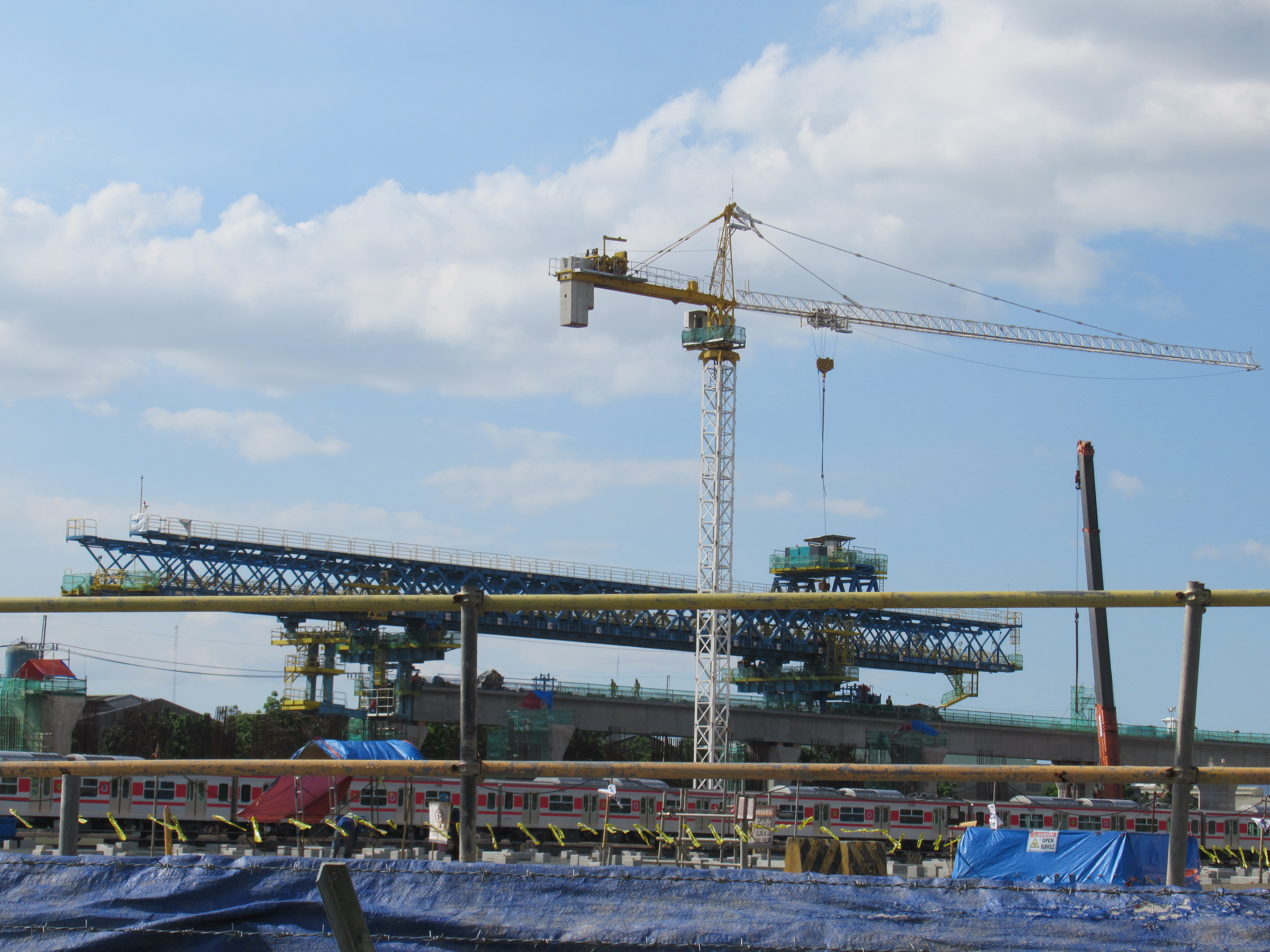
- The station under construction in 2022, with the depot in the foreground

General information
- Location: NFA–MFC Compound, MacArthur Highway, Malanday, Valenzuela, Metro Manila; Philippines
- Coordinates: Former: 14°42′31″N 120°57′37″E
- Owner: Philippine National Railways
- Operator: Philippine National Railways
- Lines: Planned: North Commuter; Former: North Main Line
- Platforms: Island platform
- Tracks: 2

Construction
- Structure type: Elevated
- Parking: Yes (Wilcon Depot Valenzuela)

Other information
- Status: Under construction
- Station code: VAL

History
- Opened: March 24, 1891
- Former names: Polo

Services
Commuter rail
Location

Valenzuela station, also known as West Valenzuela station, is an under-construction elevated North–South Commuter Railway (NSCR) station located in Valenzuela, Metro Manila, Philippines. The station was part of the Philippine National Railways (PNR) North Main Line before its closure in the 1980s.

Beside the station is the main depot of the NSCR. This depot will also serve as the operations control center for the entire railway system.

== History ==
=== Polo station ===
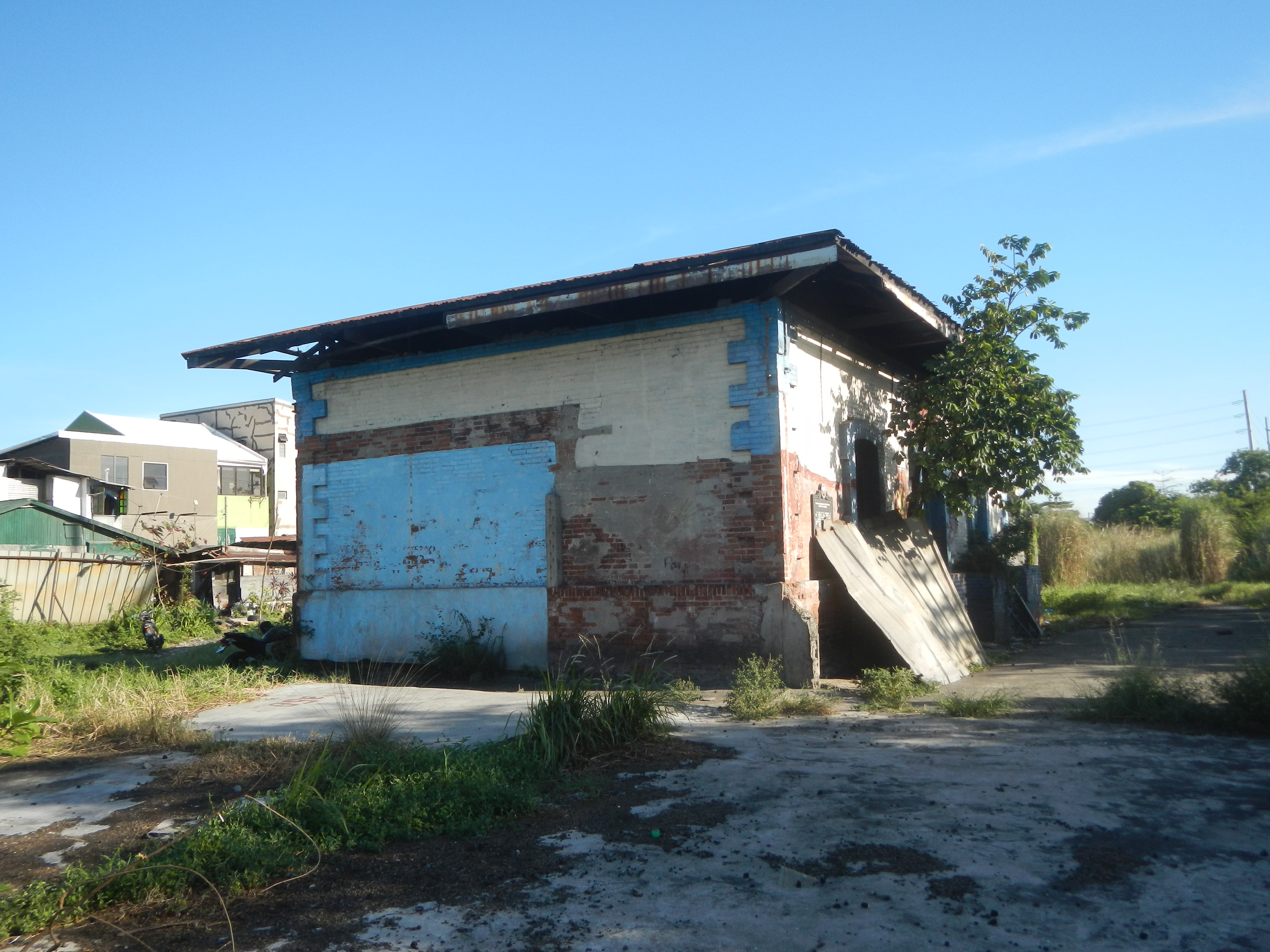
The old Polo station in 2018.

The station opened in as Polo station, in what was then the municipality of Polo, in Bulacan. This was originally part of the railway line connecting Manila to northern Luzon. It once served as a flag stop. Along with the then-municipality, it was later renamed and became known as the Valenzuela station.

The station was abandoned in 1997 after services to Meycauayan ceased. It was supposed to be built as a result of the Northrail project – a rebuilding of the line from Manila to Pampanga which would partly use the old right-of-way. The project commenced in 2007, however, construction was halted as of 2011. The ill-governed project did not continue even after a renegotiation, due to China calling off the overseas development assistance fund for the project.

With the full swing construction of the North-South Commuter Railway, the old station is cordoned off and will be restored as part of the construction agreement. The new elevated station will be located a half-mile away north from the old one.

=== Revival ===
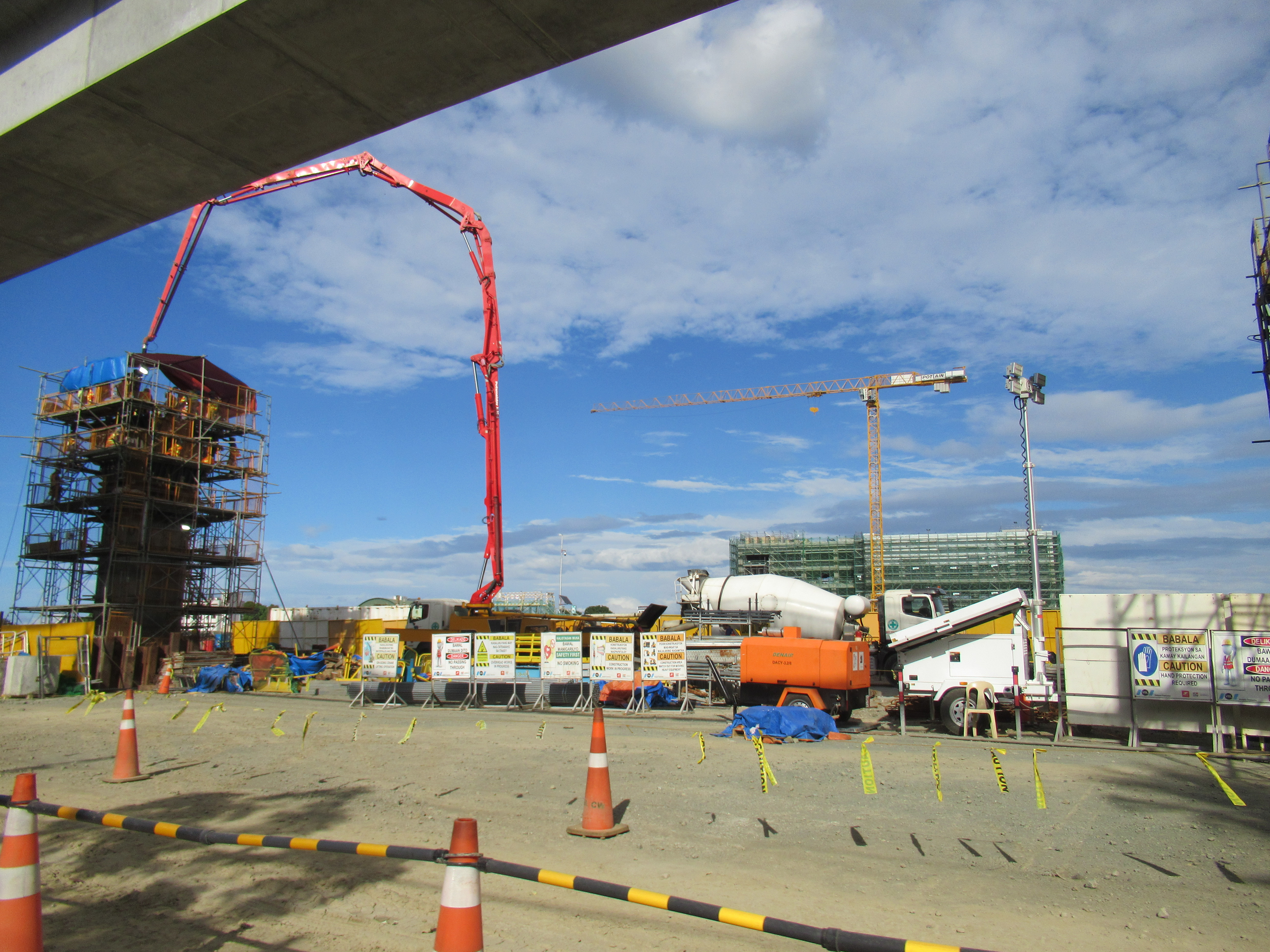
Construction of West Valenzuela station in March 2022

This station, which is named West Valenzuela station (to apparently distinguish it with Metro Manila Subway's East Valenzuela station), will be one of the first six stations of the Manila–Clark Railway or North–South Commuter Railway — a mass transit railway between Laguna, Metro Manila and the Clark metropolitan area. It is expected to open in 2027.

It is also a likely target for restoration for the Metro North Commuter Line as the station before it, Acacia station, is reopened. Two stations may be considered. One candidate site, apart from the old station in Polo, Valenzuela, is near the PNR bridge tunnel in the Karuhatan-Malinta border – the Malinta Bridge. If realized, this bridge will be within the historical railway station in Dalandanan. This is where Antonio Luna once planned defenses against the Americans during the precursors of the Philippine-American war. It is highly implied that the restoration of services may reach Meycauayan and beyond, as it did in the past.

Railway restoration was hampered by the construction of NLEX Harbor Link Segment 10.1, which runs at vital parts of the route going to Valenzuela, which has been opened on March 1, 2019. A vital component to the restoration of the services is the reconstruction of the railway bridge crossing Tullahan River, which has since been demolished and destroyed due to the aforementioned obsolescence and the construction of the expressway. Studies to rebuild the bridge and eventually reintroduce railway services in Polo have started.
