= Samson Road =

Street in Caloocan, the Philippines

Coordinates: 14°39′26″N 120°58′38″E

C-4
- Circumferential Road 4
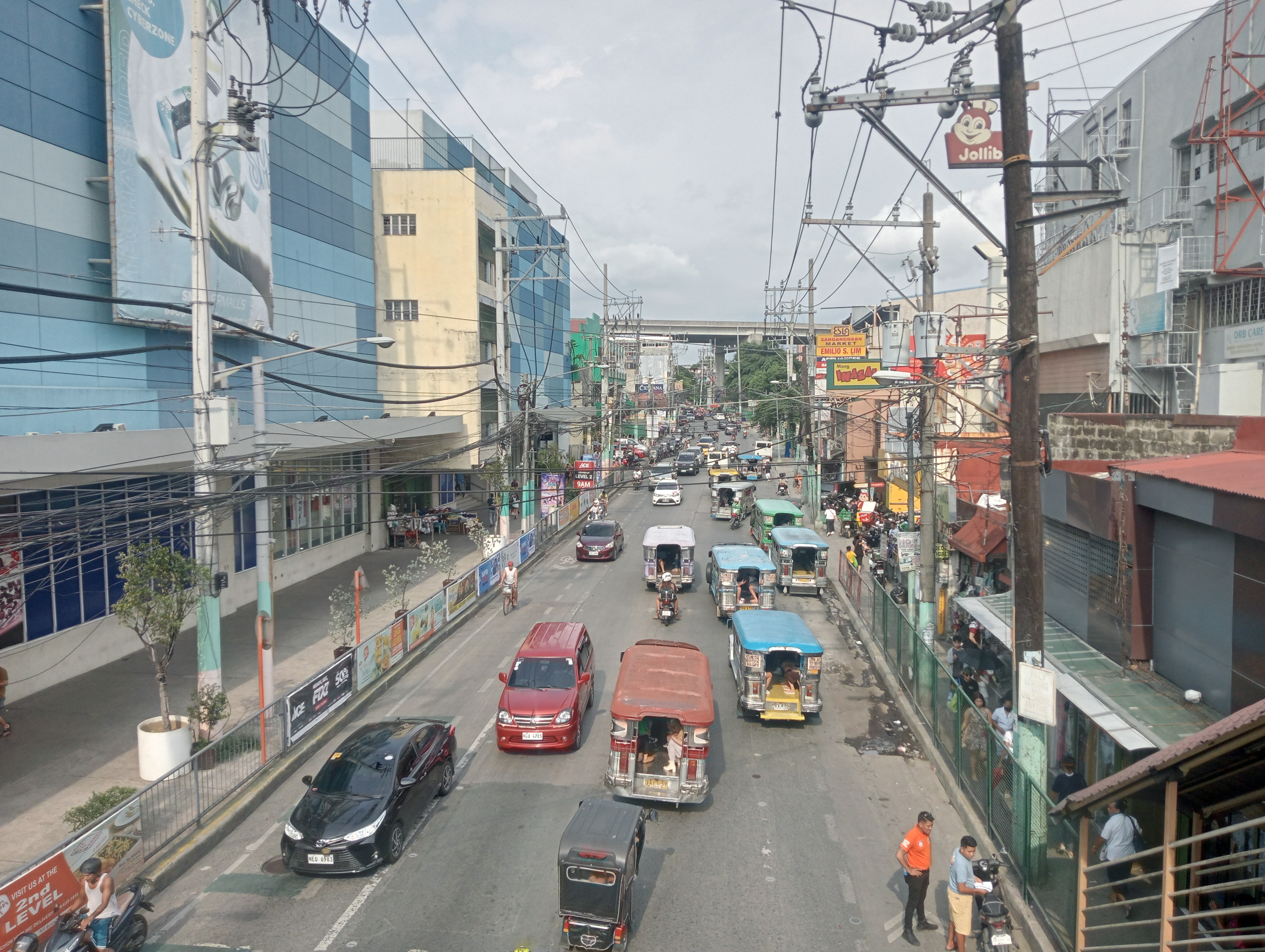
- Samson Road, looking east near SM Center Sangandaan
- Interactive map of Samson Road
- Part of: C-4 C-4; AH 26 (N120)
- Namesake: Apolonio Samson
- Maintained by: Department of Public Works and Highways – Metro Manila 3rd District Engineering Office
- Length: 1.06 km (0.66 mi)
- Location: Caloocan
- East end: Bonifacio Monument Circle
- West end: A. Mabini Street / Marcelo H. Del Pilar Street

Samson Road is a major east–west street in Caloocan, northern Metro Manila, Philippines. It is a continuation of Epifanio de los Santos Avenue (EDSA), linked to it via the Bonifacio Monument Roundabout (Monumento) to form a single through route. These roads form part of Circumferential Road 4 (C-4) of Metro Manila's arterial road network, National Route 120 of the Philippine highway network, and Asian Highway 26 of the Asian highway network.

Samson Road is named after Apolonio Samson, a Katipunan barrio lieutenant from Sitio Kangkong, Balintawak, Caloocan (now part of Quezon City), who fought alongside Andres Bonifacio during the Philippine Revolution.

== Route ==
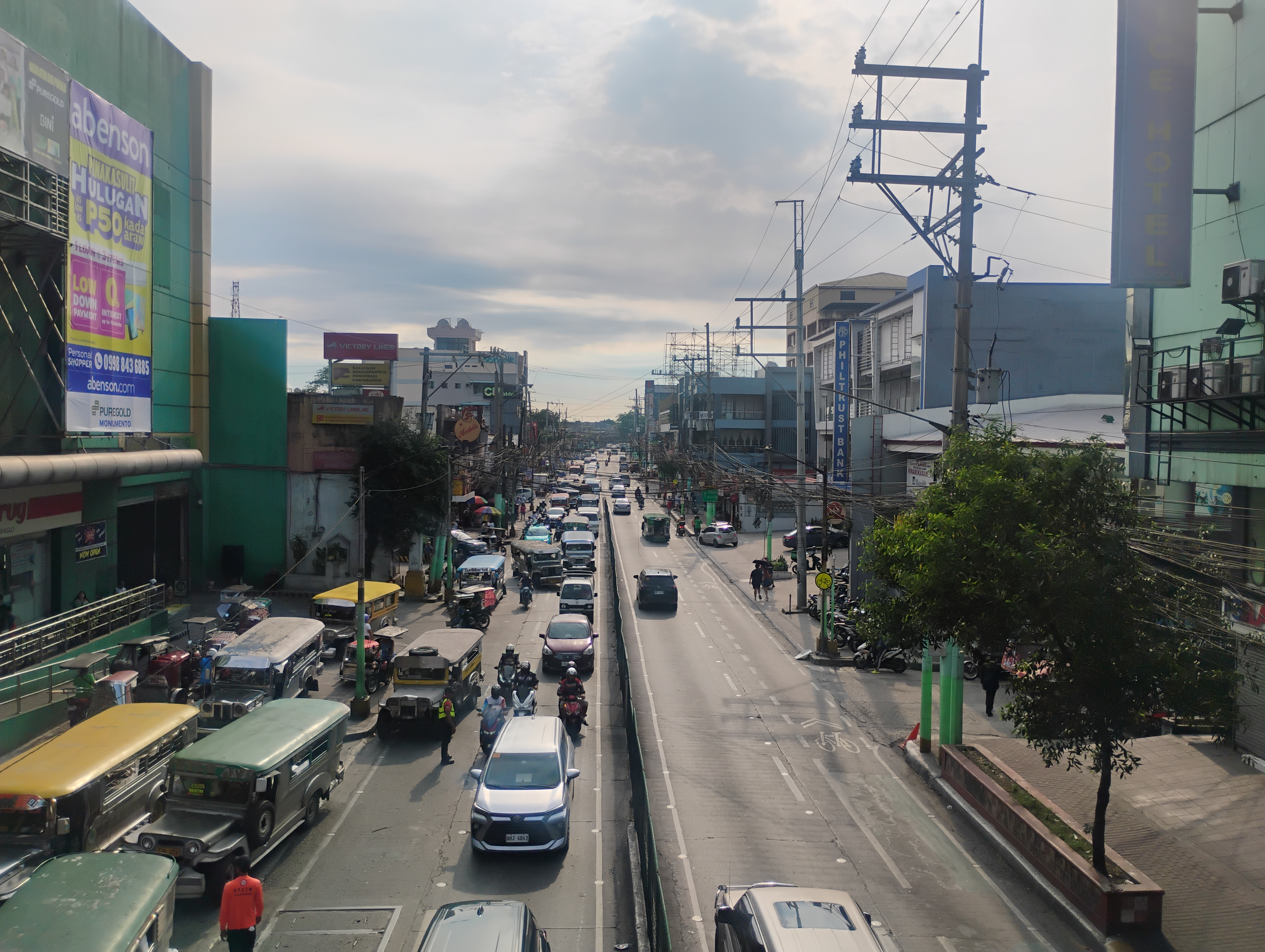
Samson Road looking west from Samson Road Footbridge near Bonifacio Monument

Samson Road, the main road in South Caloocan, officially begins at the Bonifacio Monument Roundabout (Monumento), the junction with EDSA, MacArthur Highway and Rizal Avenue Extension, and ends at the junction with A. Mabini and Marcelo H. Del Pilar Streets. At its eastern terminus, it runs between Araneta Square Mall and Puregold Monumento (on the northwest corner of Rizal Avenue and Samson Road) and SM Hypermarket Monumento (on the southwest corner of MacArthur Highway and Samson) at Monumento. The road is generally commercial for most of its length, with a mix of high-density residential zones and a few schools. Notable sites along the road are the University of the East Caloocan (formerly UE Tech), SM Center Sangandaan, and the Caloocan railway station. It is also the home of the University of Caloocan City and the Philippine National Railways Hospital (Col. Salvador T. Villa Memorial Hospital). At its western terminus, it continues west as Gen. San Miguel Street.

== History ==
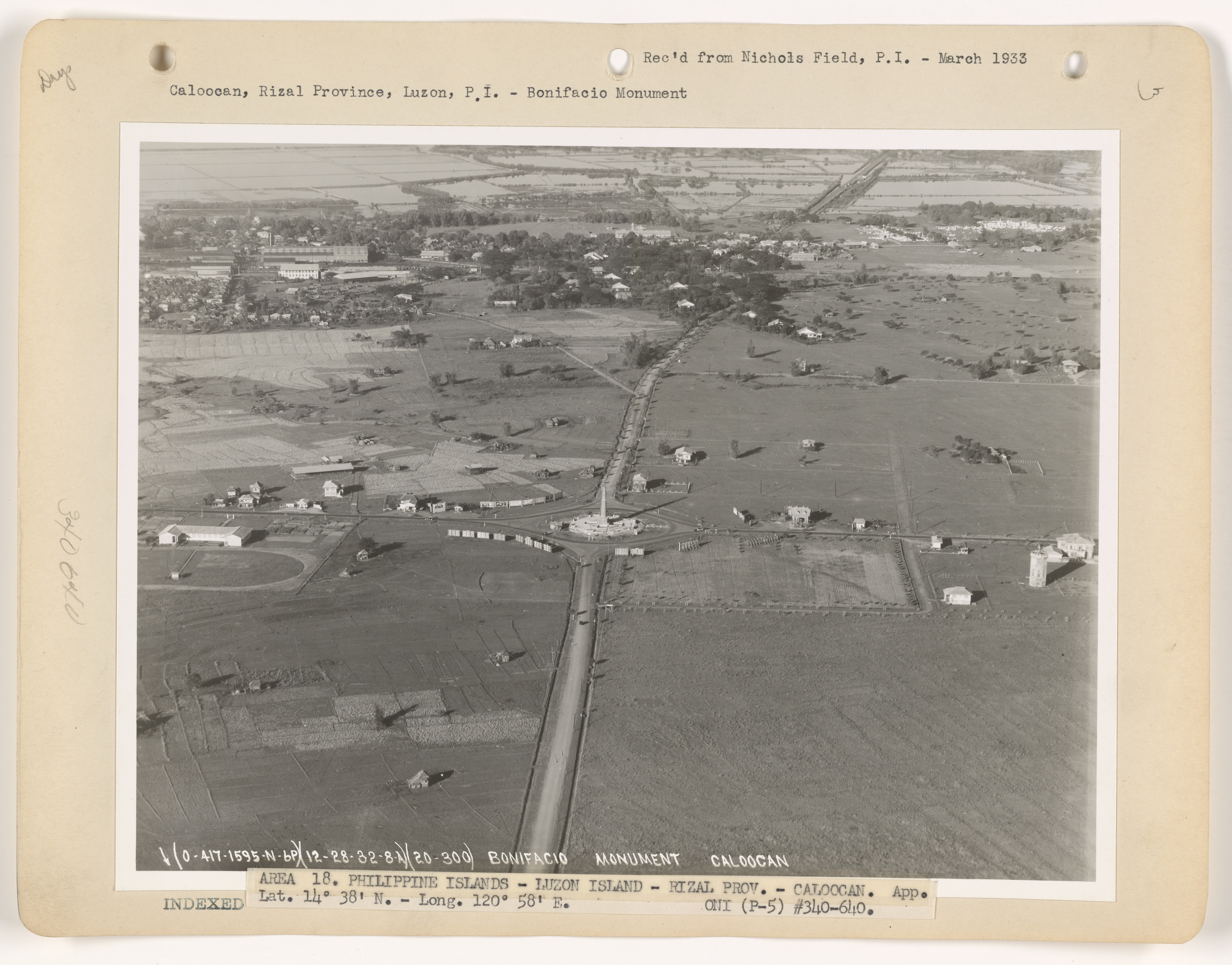
Aerial view of Caloocan showing Calle Samson, 1933

Samson Road, formerly called Calle Samson, used to reach as far as nearby Malabon to the west and San Francisco del Monte in present-day Quezon City to the east. It comprised the segments currently known as Gen. San Miguel Street, EDSA (from Monumento to Balintawak), and apparently the Old Samson Road that reached Sitio Kangkong, where its namesake, Katipunero Apolonio Samson, hailed from. Its section west of Mabini and Del Pilar, now Gen. San Miguel Street, used to be the right-of-way alignment of tranvia's Manila–Malabon line until 1945. It became part of the Manila Circumferential Road (present-day EDSA; Highway 54 or Route 54) until the 1950s. It was later made part of Circumferential Road 4 when the proposal for the Metro Manila Arterial Road System was made in the late 1960s.
