= Radial Road 10 =

Radial road of Manila, Philippines

R-10 Radial Road 10
- Road 10
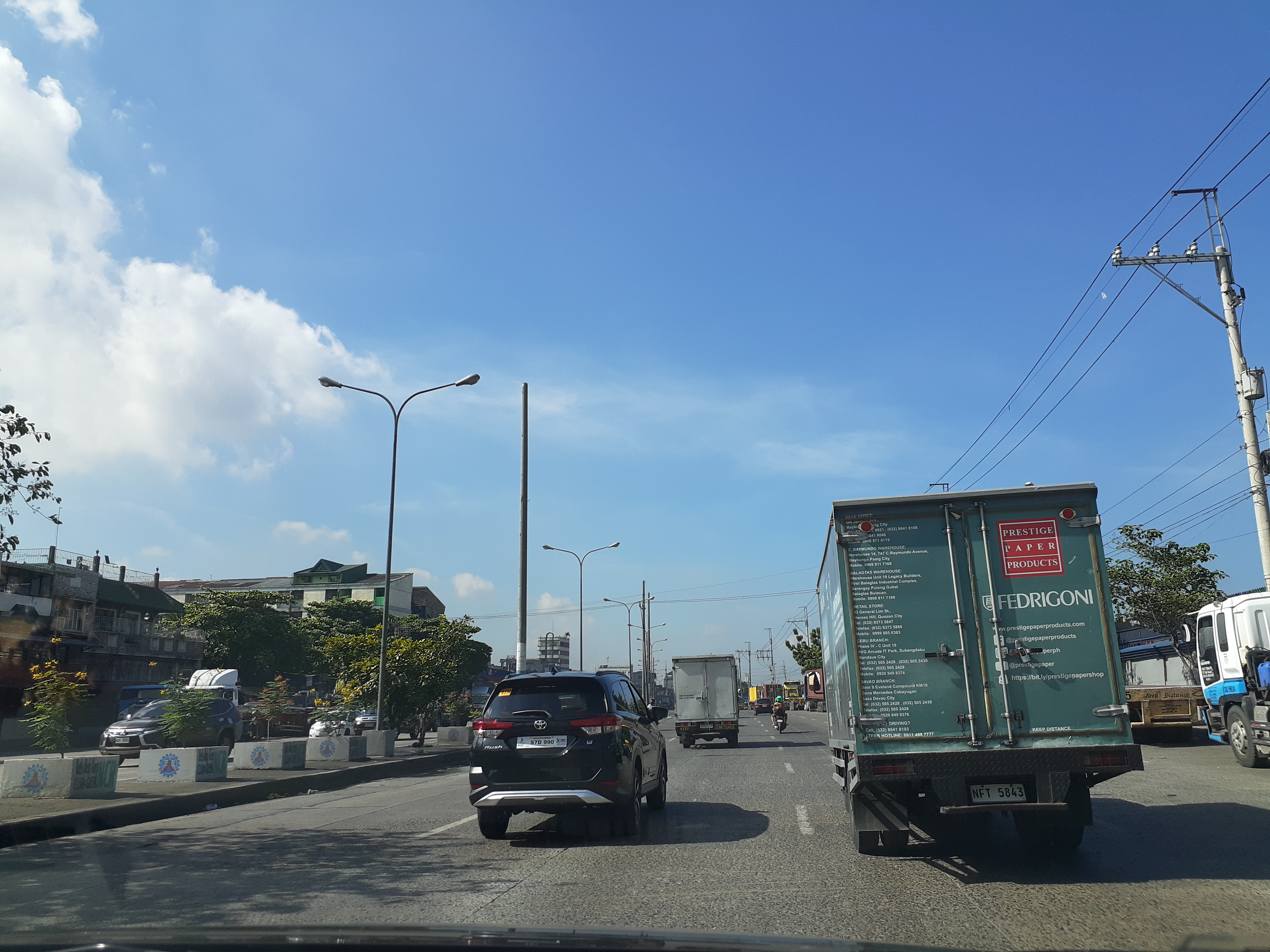
- Mel Lopez Boulevard, a segment of R-10

Route information
- Maintained by Department of Public Works and Highways and Metropolitan Manila Development Authority
- Length: 105.0 km (65.2 mi) Including the existing 6.7 km (4.2 mi) Manila–Navotas segment (calculation from Google Maps)
- Component highways: AH26 in Manila and Navotas

Major junctions
- South end: Anda Circle in Manila
- N145 (Recto Avenue) in Manila; N140 (Capulong Street) in Manila; E5 (NLEX Harbor Link) in Navotas; N130 (C-3 Road) in Navotas
- North end: AH26 in Navotas; Future: Bataan

Location
- Country: Philippines
- Major cities: Manila and Navotas

Highway system
- Roads in the Philippines; Highways; Expressways; List

Radial Road 10 (R-10), informally known as the R-10 Road, and commonly Road 10, is a network of roads and bridges which will comprise the tenth radial road of Manila in the Philippines once completed. It is the westernmost of the radial roads north of the Pasig River, running north–south close to the shoreline of Manila Bay. When completed, the road would link the city of Manila with Navotas and the northern coastal provinces of Bulacan, Pampanga, and Bataan in Central Luzon.

At present, only the Manila–Navotas segment of the road is complete.

== Route description ==
=== Mel Lopez Boulevard ===
Between Anda Circle and the Maralla Bridge over Marala Creek (Sunog Apog Creek), R-10 is known as Mel Lopez Boulevard, formerly President Ferdinand E. Marcos Highway. It is the only segment of R-10 in the city of Manila that passes through the Manila North Harbor complex in Tondo before arriving in the city of Navotas, where it continues simply as R-10.

=== Radial Road 10 ===
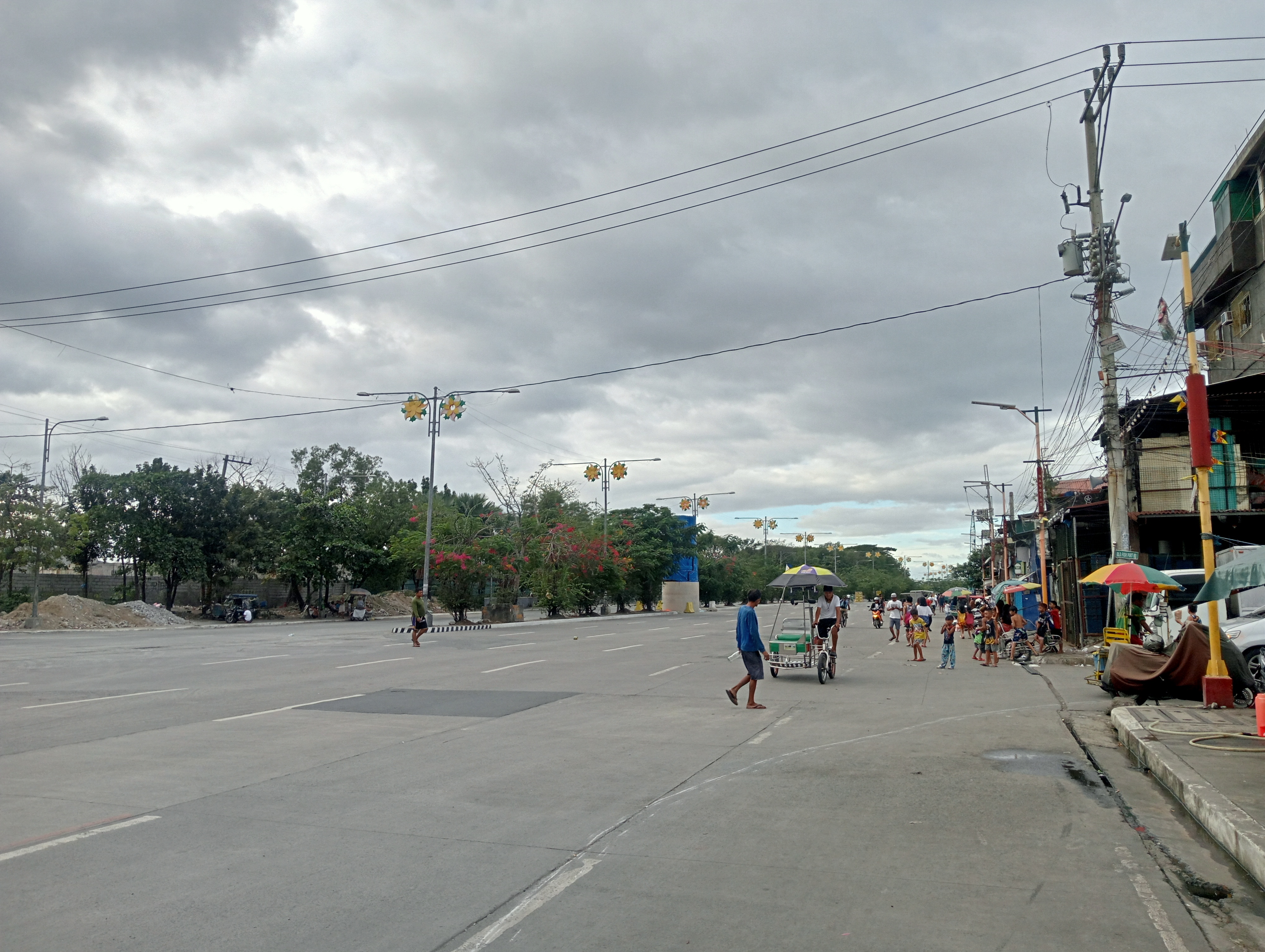
R-10 in Navotas

North of the Estero de Marala, R-10 serves the Navotas Fish Port Complex and terminates at the Bangkulasi Bridge over the Tullahan River, where it continues towards South Caloocan and Quezon City as Circumferential Road 4 (C-4).

=== Manila–Bataan Coastal Road ===
A highway linking Manila and the province of Bataan has been proposed as an extension of R-10. The plan was conceptualized during the presidency of Ferdinand Marcos. Like Radial Road 1 and its segments, Roxas Boulevard and the Manila–Cavite Expressway, the highway would run along the coast of Manila Bay north of the Pasig River. From the current terminus of R-10 in Navotas, Phase 1 will travel north along the coastal Bulacan municipalities and end at the proposed North Luzon Expressway (NLEX) Phase 3 in Bacolor, Pampanga, while Phase 2 will travel south from NLEX Phase 3 in Lubao, Pampanga to Balanga, Bataan. The proposed highway would be built over fishponds and serve as flood barriers for the coastal provinces.

== See also ==
- List of roads in Metro Manila
