= Circumferential Road 4 =

Beltway road in Metro Manila, Philippines

C-4 Circumferential Road 4
- C-4 Road
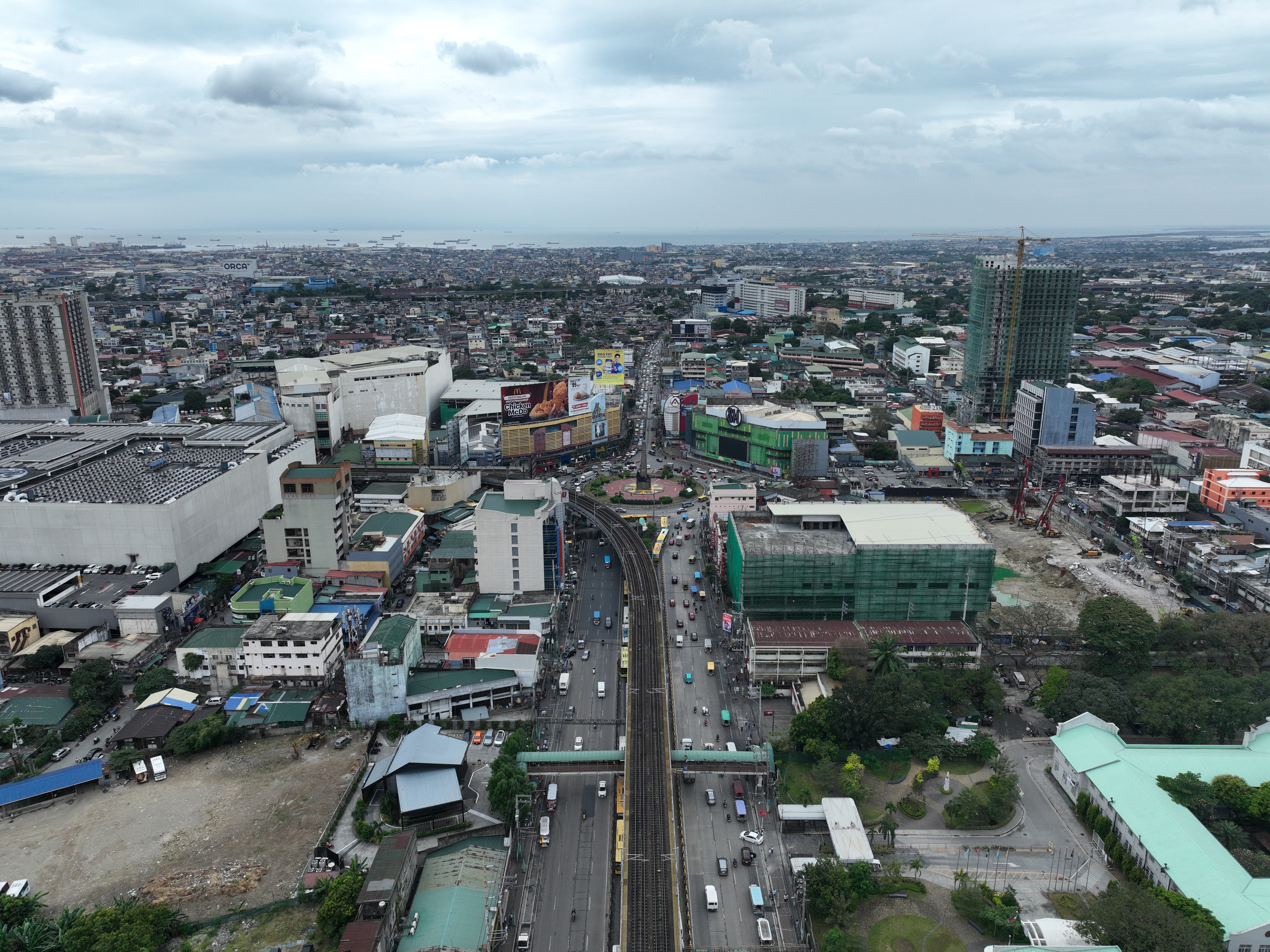
- EDSA and Samson Road, both components of C-4, intersecting at the Monumento Circle in Caloocan

Route information
- Maintained by the Department of Public Works and Highways and the Metropolitan Manila Development Authority
- Length: 27.35 km (16.99 mi)
- Component highways: AH 26 (N120) from Navotas to Caloocan; AH 26 (N1) from Caloocan to Pasay

Major junctions
- Beltway around Manila
- North end: AH 26 (N120) (Radial Road 10) in Navotas
- South end: AH 26 (N120) / N61 (Roxas Boulevard) in Pasay

Location
- Country: Philippines
- Regions: Metro Manila
- Major cities: Caloocan, Makati, Malabon, Mandaluyong, Navotas, Pasay, Quezon City, and San Juan

Highway system
- Roads in the Philippines; Highways; Expressways; List

Circumferential Road 4 (C-4), informally known as the C-4 Road, is a network of roads and bridges which comprise the fourth beltway of Metro Manila, Philippines. Spanning some 27.35 kilometers (16.99 mi), it connects the cities of Caloocan, Makati, Malabon, Mandaluyong, Navotas, Pasay, Quezon City, and San Juan. The entire stretch is a component of the Pan-Philippine Highway, with the segment between the Balintawak and Magallanes Interchanges serving as the main route and the remaining sections forming the western Metro Manila spur.

== Route description ==
=== C-4 Road ===
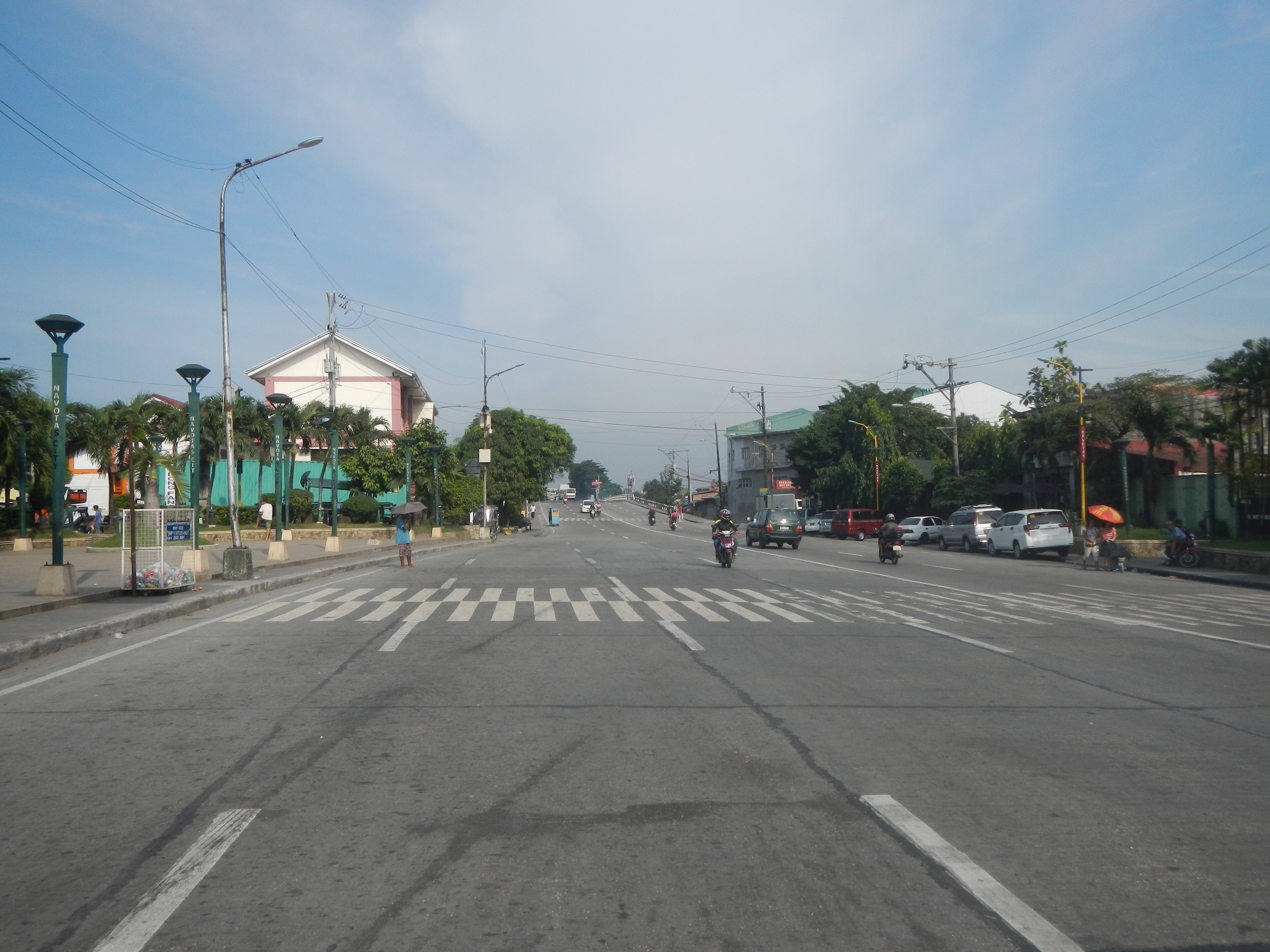
C-4 Road in Navotas

The section of C-4 Road is known as such from R-10 at the Bangkulasi Bridge over the Tullahan River in Navotas to Paterio Aquino Avenue (Letre Road) at the boundary of Malabon and Caloocan.

=== Gen. San Miguel Street ===
After passing Paterio Aquino Avenue (Letre Road), C-4 becomes General San Miguel Street, a four-lane road in Caloocan.

=== Samson Road ===
After passing the junction with Marcelo H. Del Pilar and A. Mabini Streets in Caloocan, C-4 becomes Samson Road. Also called Caloocan Road and Monumento Avenue, it is a main road in Caloocan with four lanes, running up to the roundabout at Monumento, a monument to Andrés Bonifacio.

=== Epifanio de los Santos Avenue ===
EDSA is a 10-lane highway that utilizes interchanges and grade separations. It forms the majority of C-4, passing through the cities of Caloocan, Quezon City, San Juan, Mandaluyong, Makati, and Pasay. The C-4 segment of EDSA starts at Monumento in Caloocan and ends at the intersection with Roxas Boulevard (R-1) in Pasay.

== Intersections ==
Intersections are numbered by kilometer post, with Rizal Park in Manila designated as kilometer zero.

Province	City/Municipality	km (Note: Sources:)	mi	Destinations	Notes
Navotas		10– 13	6.2– 8.1	AH 26 (N120) (Radial Road 10).	Western terminus of C-4. Continues south as AH 26 (N120) (Radial Road 10).
Navotas				P. Cadomiga Street	One-way to and from C-4 Road.
Navotas				San Marcos Street	One-way to and from C-4 Road.
Navotas		10– 13	6.2– 8.1	M. Naval Street	One-way to M. Noval Street (northbound).
Navotas–Malabon boundary				C-4 Bridge II	
Malabon				Leoño Street	
Malabon				Manapat Street	
Malabon				C-4 Bridge I	
Malabon		12	7.5	General Borromeo Street	Access to C-3 Road.
Malabon				Dagat-Dagatan Avenue	Access to C-3 Road.
Malabon–Caloocan boundary		11	6.8	Paterio Aquino Avenue	One-way from C-4 Road. Westbound access only.
Caloocan				West end of C-4 Road. East end of Samson Road.	
Caloocan				Marcelo H. Del Pilar Street / A. Mabini Street	
Caloocan				Philippine National Railways Metro Commuter Line crossing	
Caloocan				UE Tech Street	
Caloocan				New Abbey Road	
Caloocan				Caimito Road	
Caloocan				Malonzo Road	
Caloocan				University Avenue	
Caloocan				Villarosa Street	
Caloocan		10	6.2	Araneta Avenue	One-way to Samson Road.
Caloocan				Torres Street	
Caloocan				P. Bonifacio Street	
Caloocan		10	6.2	Dagohoy Street	One-way access from Samson Road. Westbound access only.
Caloocan				Lapu-Lapu Street	Westbound access only.
Caloocan				General Pio Valenzuela Street	Westbound access only.
Caloocan				N1 (MacArthur Highway) / AH 26 (N1) (EDSA) / N150 (Rizal Avenue Extension)	Bonifacio Monument Circle (Monumento).
1.000 mi = 1.609 km; 1.000 km = 0.621 mi: Concurrency terminus; Incomplete access

== See also ==
- List of roads in Metro Manila
