= Pasig River Ferry Service =

Water transportation in Metro Manila, the Philippines

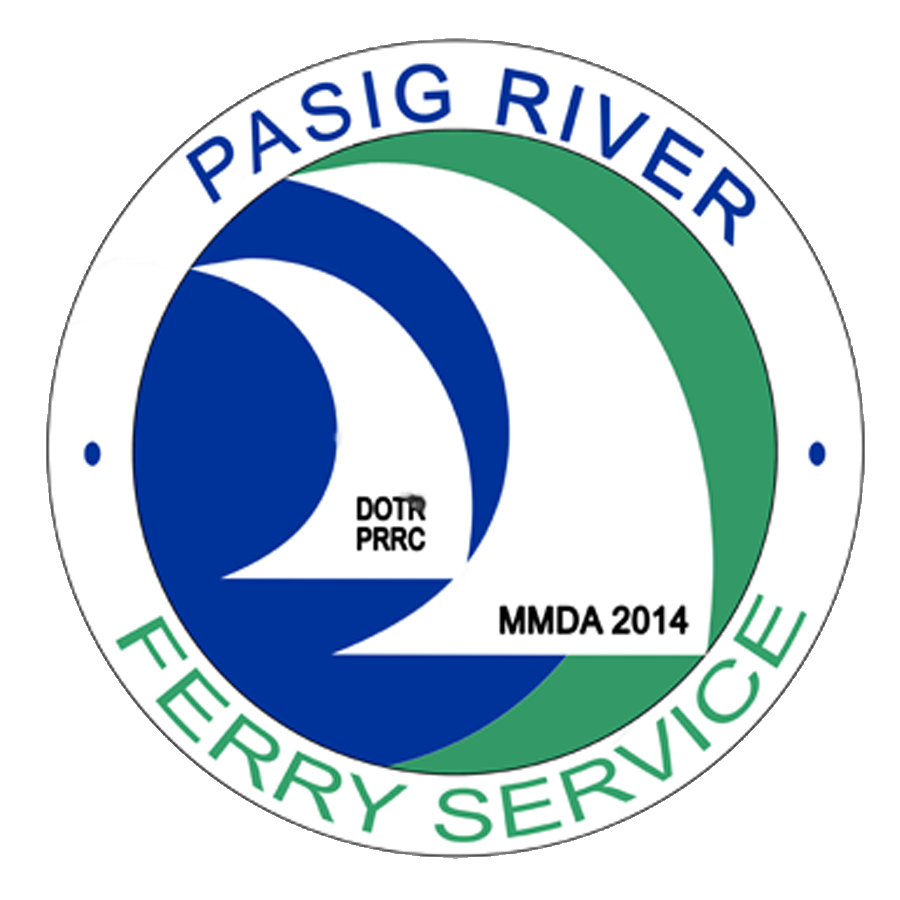

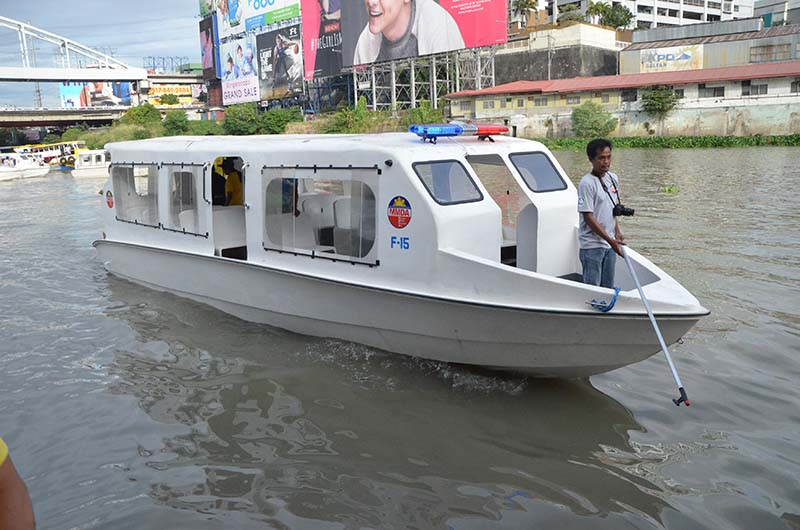
- Locale: Metro Manila
- Waterway: Pasig River
- Transit type: Water bus
- Owner: Pasig River Rehabilitation Commission (2007–2017); Metropolitan Manila Development Authority (2017–present)
- Operator: SCC Nautical Transport Services Incorporated (2007–2011); Metropolitan Manila Development Authority (2014–present) and Philippine Coast Guard (2023–present)
- Began operation: February 14, 2007
- System length: 28 km (17.40 mi)
- No. of lines: 2
- No. of vessels: 7
- No. of terminals: 13
- Daily ridership: ~330 per month (2025)
- Website: MMDA; Facebook

The Pasig River Ferry Service (PRFS) is a public water bus service based in Metro Manila, the Philippines. It is currently the only water-based transportation service in Metro Manila that cruises the length of the Pasig River and Marikina River, passing through the cities of Manila, Makati, Mandaluyong, Pasig, Marikina, and Taguig.

Originally owned and operated by a private company, SCC Nautical Transport Services Incorporated, the service was suspended in February 2011, but was reopened on April 28, 2014, and is currently owned and operated by the Metropolitan Manila Development Authority, together with the Philippine Coast Guard. Although the service is commonly referred to as a ferry, it is more akin to a water bus given its multiple stops.

== History ==
Prior to the 1990s, there were several short-lived ferry operators that provided passenger services along the Pasig River. According to the Metro Manila Urban Transportation Integration Study (MMUTIS) conducted by the Japan International Cooperation Agency (JICA) in March 1999, there was a ferry service that used to operate between the districts of Santa Cruz and Santa Ana in Manila from 1969, which had eventually ceased operations. It is said that pollution in the Pasig River contributed to the decline in ferry transport in the river in the 1960s.

In the 1980s, the Philippine government began showing interest in a ferry service along and across the Pasig River when the Ministry of Transport and Communications (now the Department of Transportation) conducted feasibility studies for ferry passenger traffic in 1980, with another feasibility study being conducted in 1989.

=== Metro Ferry ===
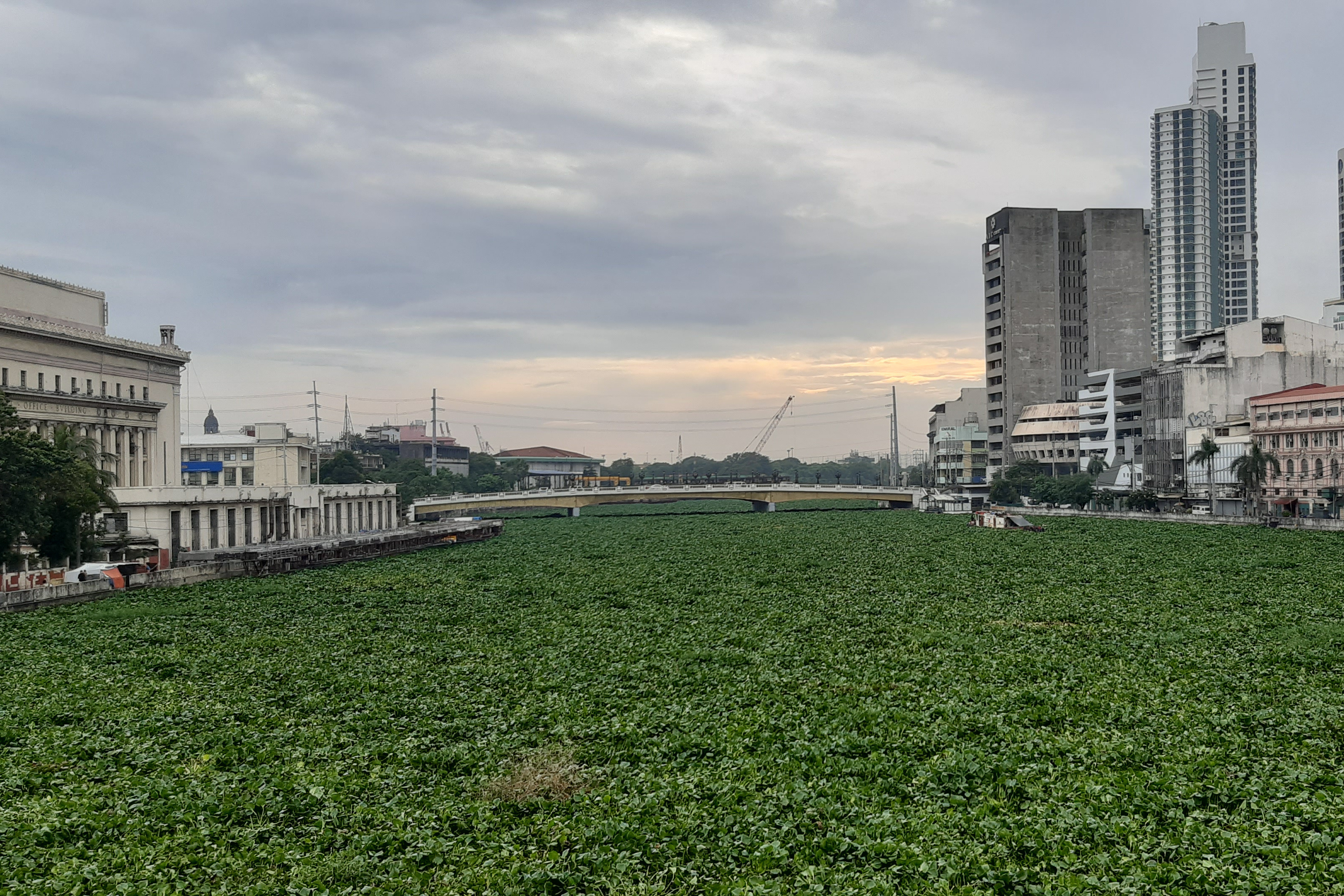
The proliferation of water hyacinths in the Intramuros-Binondo segment of the Pasig River.

In 1990, Filipino shipping conglomerate Magsaysay Lines began operating Metro Ferry as an alternative mode of transport along the Pasig River to alleviate the traffic problem in Manila. The Metro Ferry operated a route from Guadalupe in then-municipality of Makati down to Escolta Street in Manila, spanning a total length of 15 kilometers (9.3 mi) using river-side sheds as stations and piers constructed by the Philippine Ports Authority. The service, however, lasted only for a year, closing in 1991. Its short-lived operation was beset by problems such as the proliferation of informal settlers along the route, water lilies, garbage and other debris clogging the waters. Aside from the foul odors permeating the environs, these problems also prevented the boats from traveling at normal speeds.

=== StarCraft Ferry ===
In 1995, the StarCraft Ferry Corporation submitted proposals to provide passenger services on the river. A year earlier, however, Uniwide Sales-owned Marilag Transport Systems also submitted a proposal for ferry services not only along the Pasig River but also to and from the province of Cavite and the Baclaran area in Parañaque using foreign-made boats. The company hoped to use its Pasig River ferry services to provide transport services between its shopping centers but eventually dropped its proposal after the Philippine government prohibited the use of foreign-made boats, rendering the project unattractive.

In response to concerns about competing ferry operations along the river, President Fidel V. Ramos formed an inter-agency committee composed of national government agencies and local government units to prepare guidelines for ferryboat service on the Pasig River and plan future interconnections with ferry services in Laguna de Bay.

Eventually, StarCraft Ferry was awarded the project, with operations beginning in October 1997. The company operated a 16.2 kilometers (10.1 mi) route spanning the seven stations of Escolta, Lawton, PUP, and Punta in Manila, Hulo in Mandaluyong, Guadalupe in Makati, and Bambang in Pasig. The total trip duration from end to end took an average duration of 45 to 50 minutes, with an average headway of 30 minutes during off-peak hours and 15 to 20 minutes during peak hours at operating speeds of 18 kilometers per hour (11 mph) to 27 kilometers per hour (17 mph). The service operated with an average load factor of 80 percent and had fares ranging from ₱10 to ₱30 pesos (equivalent to ₱27 to ₱81 pesos today)

The company had a fleet of 30 locally constructed Manta boats (the same type used by the current Pasig River Ferry Service). Each boat had the seating capacity for 32 passengers. By 1999, however, only 19 such boats were still in operation as many of StarCraft boats were damaged by chipped debris or had clogged propellers.

Ridership of the StarCraft Ferry at the time was recorded at 900 to 1,200 passengers per day, with the most common trips being recorded between its Guadalupe station in Makati and the Escolta or Lawton stations in Manila. Additionally, StarCraft Ferry also operated a ferry service between Escolta in Manila and Los Baños, Laguna from 1998 onwards until its license was revoked by the Laguna Lake Development Authority due to insufficient paperwork. StarCraft's ferry services in the Pasig River lasted for almost three years until it closed in 1999, facing the same problems with foul odor and debris along the river that hampered its operating speeds.

=== Current iteration ===
==== Initial reopening ====
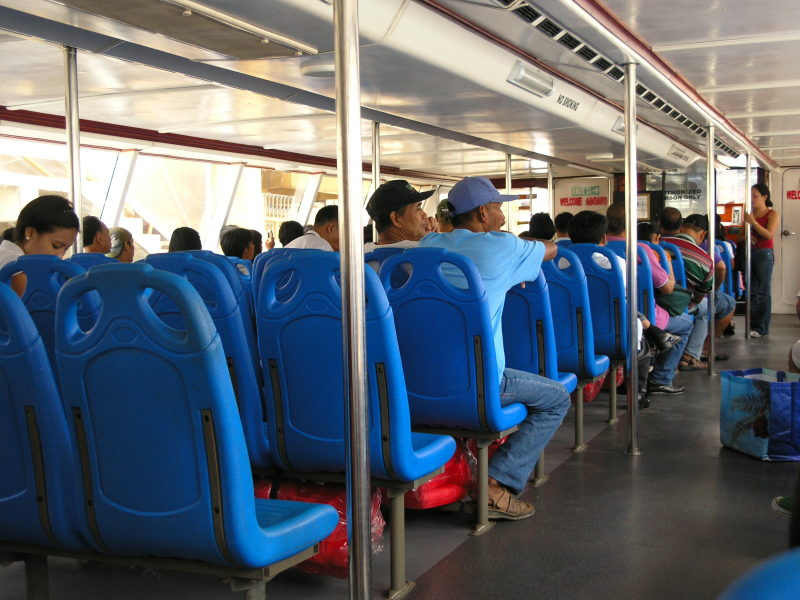
Passengers in one of the boats of the ferry service in 2008

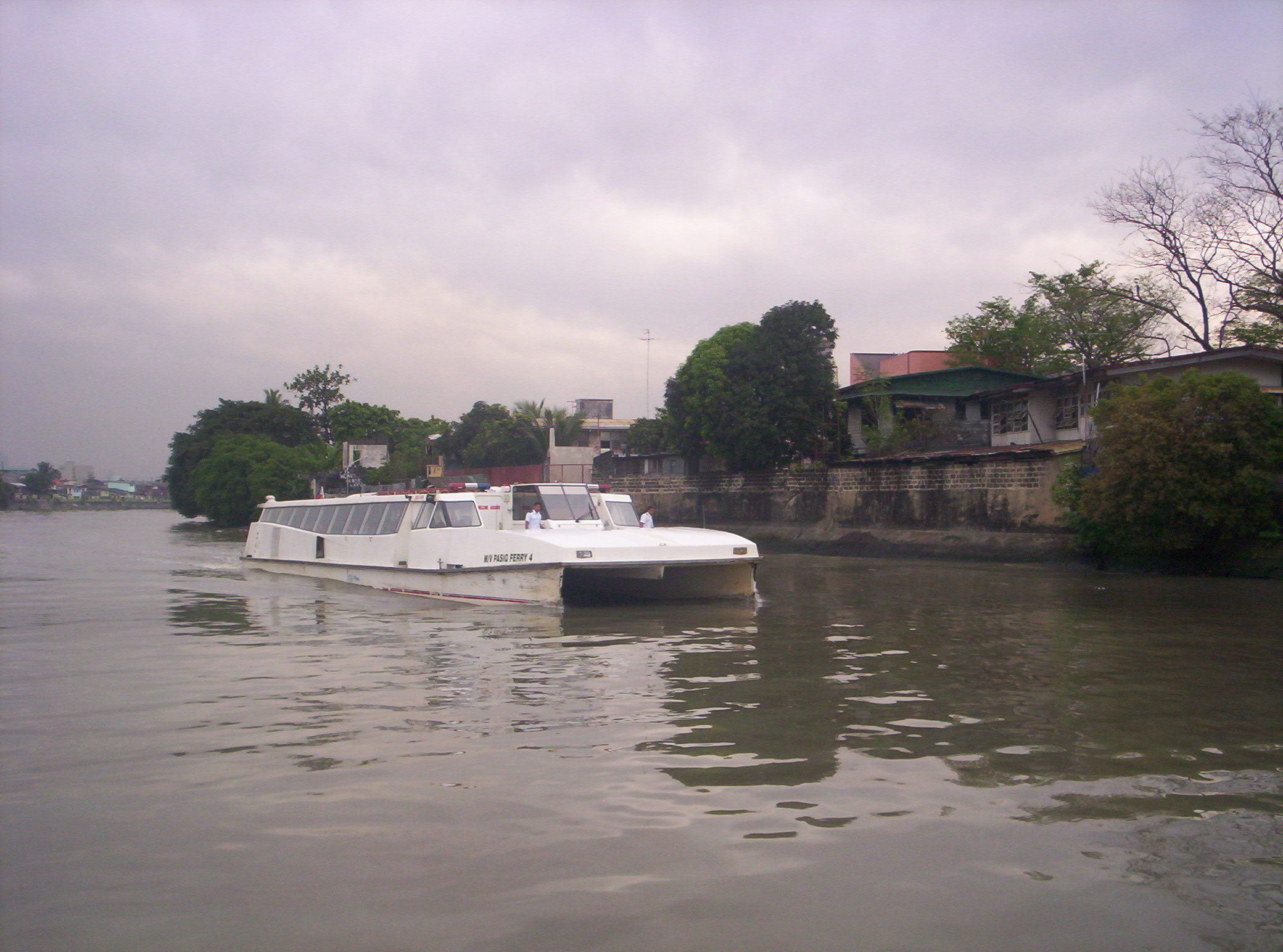
A catamaran boat used on the Pasig River Ferry Service in 2009

The current ferry service, the Pasig River Ferry Service, was first inaugurated by President Gloria Macapagal Arroyo on February 14, 2007, that initially covered 15 stations, namely Escolta, Plaza Mexico, Quezon Bridge, PUP, Lambingan, and Santa Ana in Manila, Valenzuela and Guadalupe in Makati, Hulo in Mandaluyong, San Joaquin and Caniogan in Pasig, Riverbanks, Santa Elena, and Marcos Bridge in Marikina, and Napindan in Taguig. The service was launched with an initial fleet of three catamaran boats operated by private operator SCC Nautical Transport Services Incorporated under a franchise granted by Maritime Industry Authority (MARINA) and an agreement between the Pasig River Rehabilitation Commission (PRRC), Department of Transportation and Communications (DOTC), and Metropolitan Manila Development Authority (MMDA).

The service was planned to use air-conditioned boats with faster travel speeds and onboard amenities such as payphones, a security system, and a ticketing system with single journey and storage value RFID ticketing. However, after four years, operational losses and overabundant water hyacinths forced the Pasig River Ferry Service to cease operations in 2011. A Commission on Audit report in 2011 revealing that the operating expenses of the service amounted to ₱101.4 million against a revenue of ₱7.33 million. This resulted in the service being highly dependent on government subsidies. In response to the report, the PRRC stated that ferry revenue declined due to a dwindling number of passengers and frequent cancellation of regular trips in order to accommodate river tours.

==== Current service ====
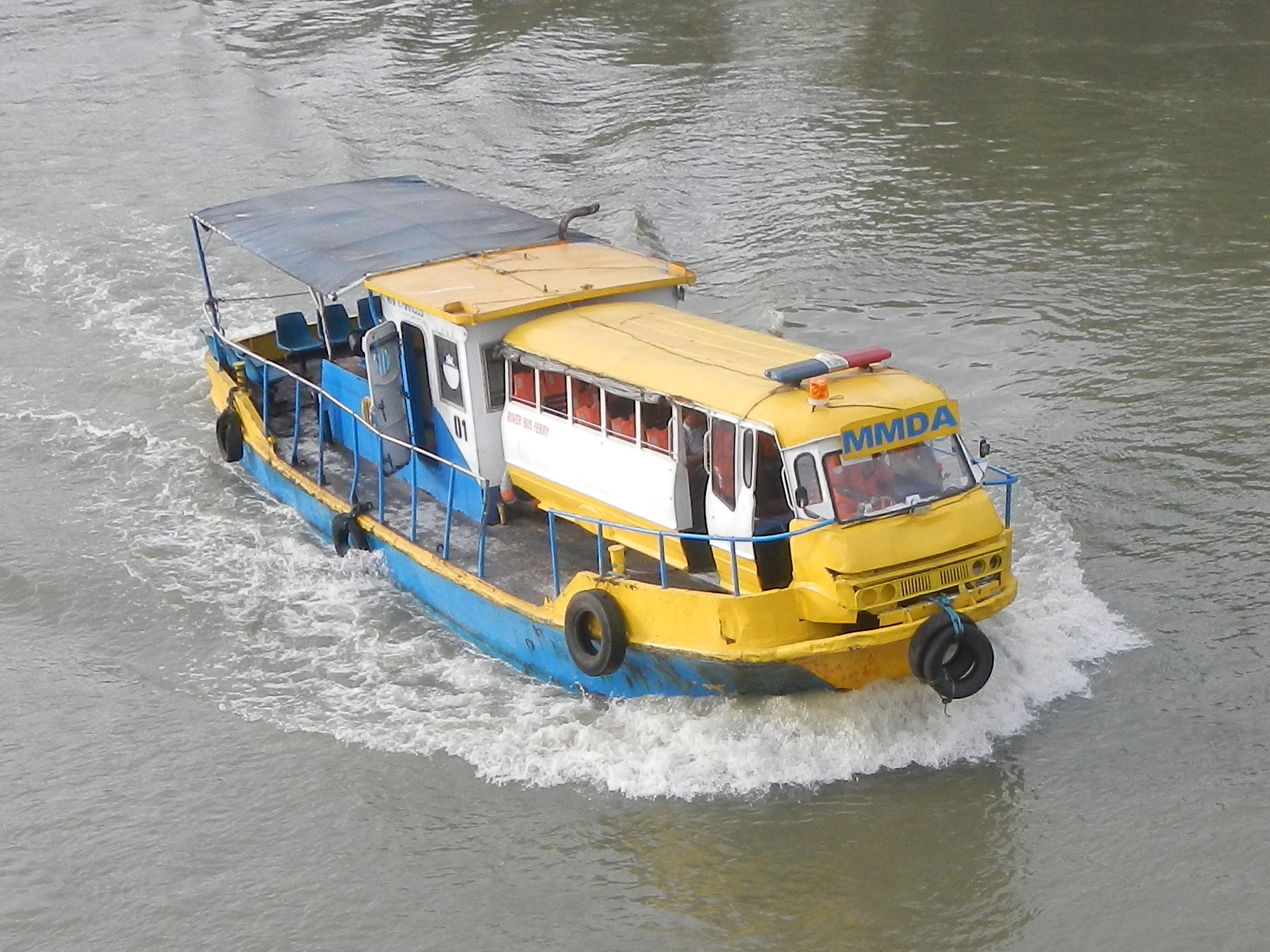
Water bus-style boats used by the MMDA for the Pasig River Ferry Service in 2017.

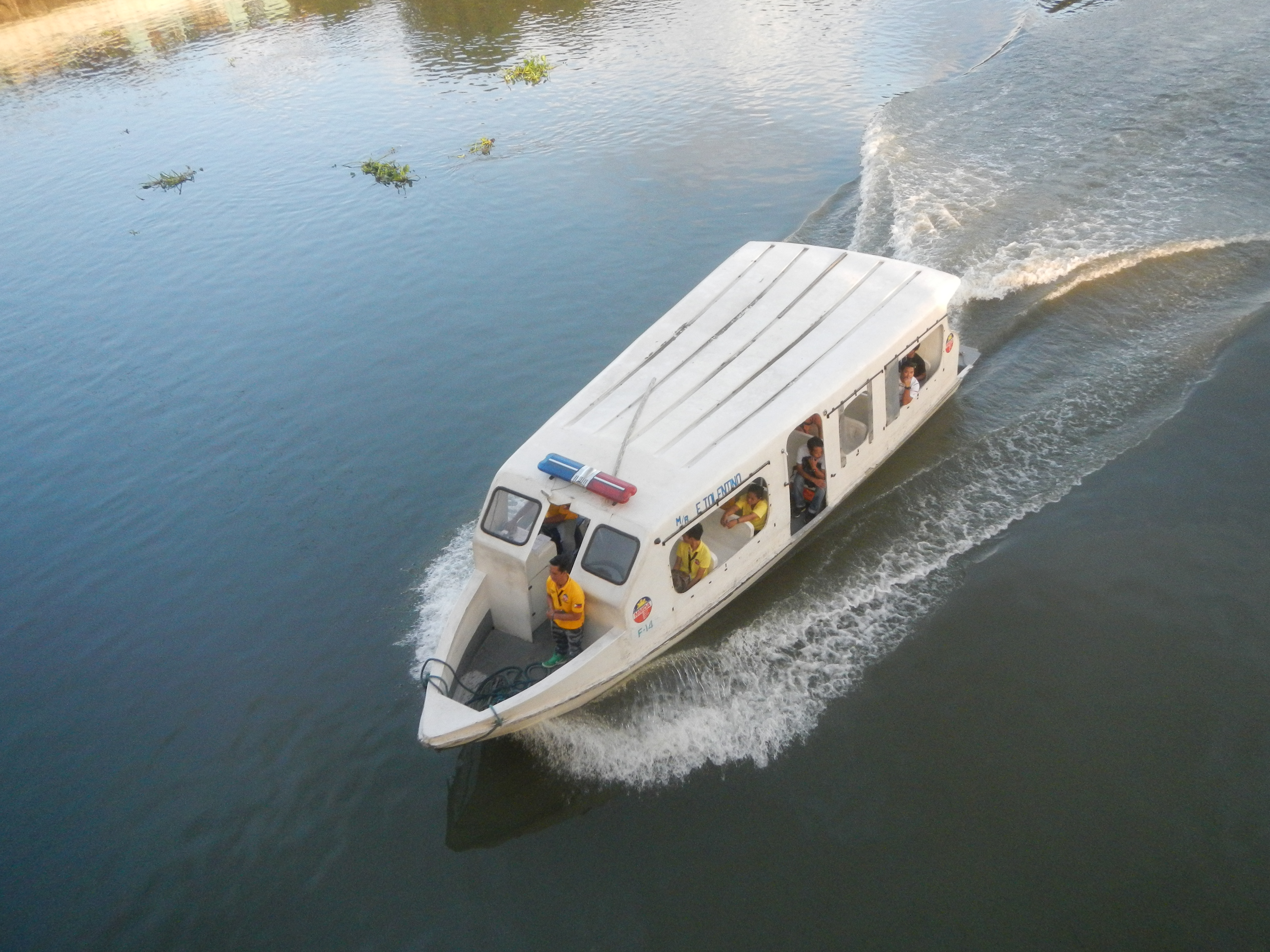
M/R E. Tolentino, one of the ferry boats of the Pasig River Ferry Service

In 2014, the Metropolitan Manila Development Authority (MMDA) proposed a revival of the Pasig River Ferry Service to alleviate the traffic situation in Metro Manila in light of several infrastructure projects being constructed simultaneously. Ferry services were officially relaunched with four privately owned ferries and a MMDA vessel on April 28, 2014, with the service being operated by the MMDA in conjunction with the DOTr and the PRRC.

In January 2017, Pasig River Ferry Service operations were turned over from the PRRC to the MMDA. At this time, several new ferry boats were purchased and its ferry stations were rehabilitated.

=== Rehabilitation and current developments ===
In 2018, the Department of Budget and Management (DBM) pitched the Pasig River Ferry Convergence Program, a plan to develop an additional 17 stations in the next four years to serve up to 76,800 passengers daily and to bid out a contract to operate the Pasig River Ferry Service to a private firm. The MMDA had also committed to build three more stations at Circuit Makati and Quinta Market, and Kalawaan in Pasig. The DBM also bared plans to put up stations near bridges across the river, use air-conditioned vessels with a seating capacity of 50 passengers each, to operate under all weather conditions, and a planned headway of 15 minutes.

The rehabilitated Pasig River Ferry Service was relaunched on December 9, 2019. Both Pasig mayor Vico Sotto and Manila mayor Isko Moreno have both committed to donate at least two boats to the ferry service. On March 4, 2020, Mayor Sotto led the turnover of two 57-seater vessels, the M/B Mutya ng Pasig 1 (lit. 'Jewel of Pasig') and M/B Mutya ng Pasig 2 to the ferry service. A 50-seater ferry, M/B Vicente, was also donated to the MMDA by real estate company New San Jose Builders in a turnover ceremony on March 5, 2021.

On December 12, 2023, the MMDA and the Philippine Coast Guard (PCG) signed an agreement wherein the PCG would handle the operations and maintenance of the ferry system.

On January 17, 2024, the Marcos administration inaugurated its Pasig Bigyang Buhay Muli (lit. 'Give Life to Pasig Again') project, which aims to improve the existing Pasig River Ferry System through the addition of more ferry boats and stations alongside the development of linear parks, walkways, bikeways, and riverside commercial developments.

== Ridership ==
The MMDA has reported that a total of 233,082 passengers have rode the Pasig River Ferry Service in 2024, down from a total of 254,333 passengers in 2023. For the full year of 2025, the MMDA has reported a total ridership of 120,632 passengers, which is around 48.24% lower compared to 2024's total tally of 195,789 passengers.

Key
†	Highest recorded ridership

Year	Annual ridership	% change	Highest single-month ridership
2014 (Note: Data from April 28 to December 31, 2014.)	69,625	Steady	12,503 (December 2014)
2015	89,993	▲129.25	11,323 (December 2015)
2016	105,475	▲117.20	12,171 (February 2016)
2017	74,178	▼70.33	12,046 (February 2017)
2018	46,728	▼62.99	7,375 (December 2018)
2019	61,381	▲131.36	9,249 (February 2019)
2020 (Note: No ferry operations from April to July 2020.)	33,670	▲54.85	12,319 (February 2020)
2021	58,574	▲173.96	13,166 (December 2021)
2022	170,902	▲291.77	21,328 (December 2022)
2023	254,333 †	▲148.82	28,302 (March 2023) †
2024	195,789	▼23.01	23,012 (February 2024)
2025	120,632	▼48.24	15,692 (January 2025)

== Ferry network ==
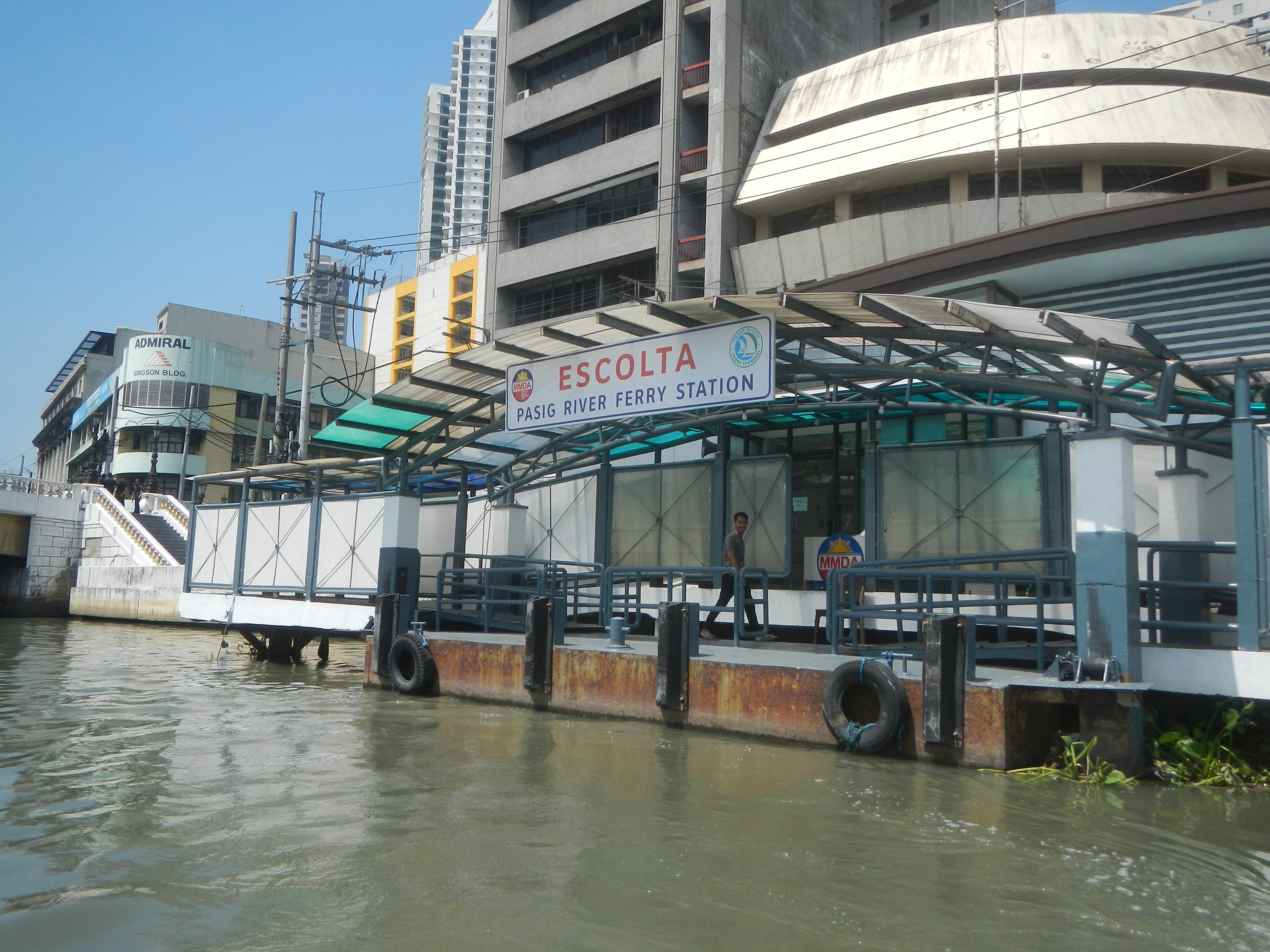
Escolta station, the current western terminus.

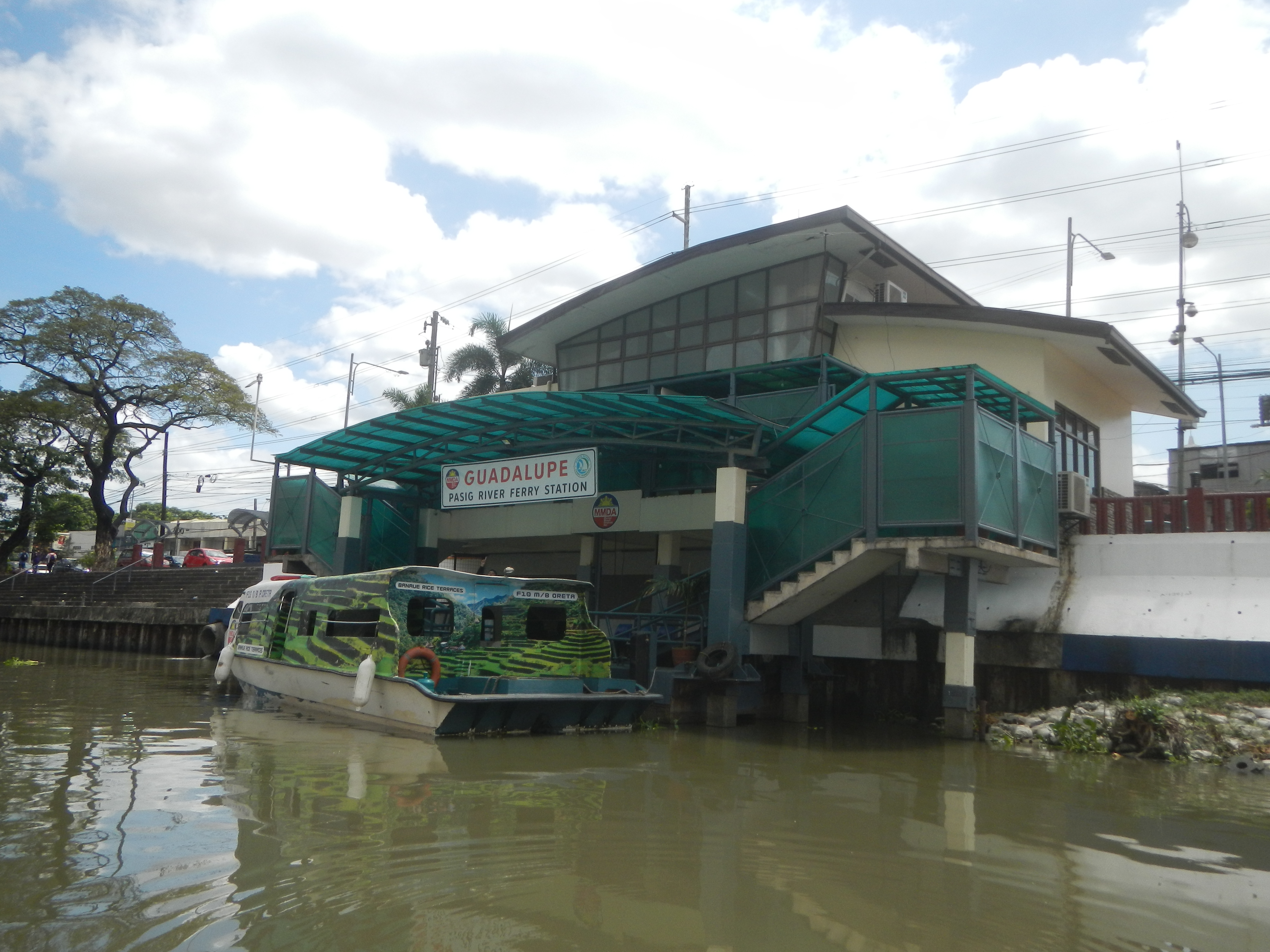
Guadalupe station

The entire ferry network has 13 stations in operation. The first line is the Pasig River Line which stretches from the Escolta ferry station along Escolta Street in Binondo, Manila to the Pinagbuhatan ferry station in Pasig. The second line is the Marikina River Line which goes from the Guadalupe ferry station in Cembo, Taguig (formerly Makati) up to the Maybunga ferry station in Pasig.

During the first iteration of the ferry service, what is now Line 2 was the Marikina River Line, which was to begin operation with the opening of the Riverbanks Station near the recently opened SM City Marikina in Marikina. The Marikina River Line as of February 23, 2009 is still closed and is still undergoing vehicular planning.

The Pasig River Ferry Service operates from Monday to Saturday between 6:00 am and 6:00 pm, with an average headway of 30 minutes between trips. The ferry is free of charge and requires presenting a valid ID upon entry. Until 2019, it had fares ranging from ₱15 to ₱95.

Through its entire operation, the ferry service changed their trip schedules several times. Each boat has a 30-minute, 1-hour, 2-hour and 3-hour trip intervals depending on the time of the day. Rush hours tend to have shorter boat intervals while off-peak hours tend to have longer boat intervals. This was done to maximize the efficiency of each boats and to reduce over-consumption of fuel.

Bicycles are allowed to be brought onto the ferry boats, including bikes as large as mountain bikes.

=== Stations ===
As of July 10, 2022, there are 13 operational ferry stations. Prior to the MMDA takeover, the Eastwood station in Quezon City and Riverbanks station in Marikina were operational. Though plans were laid out to eventually restore services there, these are currently not operational. The MMDA plans to repair and reopen the Riverbanks station once the Marikina River is confirmed to be navigable for ferry services, and has plans to construct an additional station in the vicinity of the Department of Budget and Management central office and Isla de Convalecencia in San Miguel, Manila, and Intramuros, Manila.

In September 2018, the Plaza Mexico station was demolished to give way to the construction of the Binondo-Intramuros Bridge. In its place, the MMDA is planning to reconstruct the station along Maestranza Street. In 2024, a new ferry station is set to be opened at the Bridgetowne development in Quezon City.

Key
†	Existing terminus

List of stations
Image	Name	Distance (km)		Transfers	Location
Image	Name	Between stations	Total	Transfers	Location
Line 1 (Escolta to Pinagbuhatan)
	Plaza Mexico	—	—	none	Manila
	Escolta†	—	—	Manila LRT: Carriedo	Manila
	Quezon Bridge; Lawton	—	—	Manila LRT: Central Terminal; Bus Routes: 5 6 7 14 17 23 24 25 27 34 38 40 42 48 49 53 53 Manila City Hall; P2P Bus Routes: Manila Multimodal Terminal	Manila
	Quinta	—	—	Manila LRT: Carriedo; Bus routes: 2 3 Hidalgo Street; 3 19 20 21 Avenida; 5 6 7 14 17 34 38 40 49 52 53 54 Quiapo	Manila
	PUP	—	—	Manila LRT: Pureza; Philippine National Railways: Santa Mesa; Bus Routes: 2 3 Pureza	Manila
	Santa Ana	—	—	Bangkaan Santa Ana	Manila
	Lambingan	—	—	none	Manila
	Circuit Makati (proposed)	—	—	Manila MRT: 5 Circuit	Makati
	Valenzuela	—	—	none	Makati
	Hulo	—	—	Tawiran Hulo-Poblacion	Mandaluyong
	Guadalupe	—	—	Manila MRT: Guadalupe 5 Guadalupe; EDSA Carousel: 1 Guadalupe	Taguig
	San Joaquin	—	—	none	Pasig
	Bambang (defunct)	—	—	none	Pasig
	Kalawaan	—	—	none	Pasig
	Pinagbuhatan; Napindan	—	—	none	Pasig
Line 2 (Guadalupe to Maybunga)
	Guadalupe	—	—	Manila MRT: Guadalupe 5 Guadalupe; EDSA Carousel: 1 Guadalupe	Taguig
	Caniogan (defunct)	—	—	none	Pasig
	Maybunga	—	—	none	Pasig
	Bridgetowne (under construction)	—	—	Bus Routes: 16 18 36 39 41 50 56 61 65 Ortigas Avenue; 2 SM IPI	Quezon City
	Eastwood (defunct) (Note: According to a MMDA freedom of information request, Eastwood station was operated and owned by the previous private ferry operator and as such, cannot be re-opened by the government agency without negotiations.)	—	—	Bus Routes: 16 18 36 39 41 50 56 61 Eastwood	Quezon City
	Marcos Bridge (defunct)	—	—	none	Marikina
	Riverbanks	—	—	Bus Routes: 36 Riverbanks Center	Marikina
	Santa Elena (defunct)	—	—	none	Marikina
Stations and ferry systems in italics are either under construction, proposed, or closed.

=== Active fleet ===
The Pasig River Ferry System has a fleet composed of more than 11 boats of varying passenger capacity. As of 2024, a total of 15 boats are in operation.

Ferry boats
Name	Type	Manufacturer	Status	Speed	Capacity	Launched	Image	Namesake	Notes
M/B Mutya ng Pasig 1	Fiberglass motorboat	Stoneworks Corporation	In service		51 passengers	2019		"Mutya ng Pasig" song by Nicanor Abelardo	Donated by the Pasig government. Both vessels have toilets on board.
M/B Mutya ng Pasig 2	Fiberglass motorboat	Stoneworks Corporation	In service		51 passengers	2019		"Mutya ng Pasig" song by Nicanor Abelardo	Donated by the Pasig government. Both vessels have toilets on board.
M/B Phileco	Fiberglass motorboat	Stoneworks Corporation	In service	12 knots (22 km/h)	55 passengers	2020		Phil Ecology Systems Corporation (PhilEco)	Donated by the Phil Ecology Systems Corporation under the RII Group of Companies.
M/B Soledad D.	Fiberglass motorboat	Stoneworks Corporation	In service		55 passengers	2020		Soledad Roa-Duterte	Vessel is air-conditioned.
M/B Vicente D.	Fiberglass motorboat	Stoneworks Corporation	In service	16 knots (30 km/h)	54 passengers	2021		Vicente Duterte	Donated by the New San Jose Builders. Vessel is air-conditioned.
M/B Iswims			In service		55 passengers			International Solid Waste Integrated Management Specialist (SWIMS), Inc.	
M/B B. Abalos			In service		36 passengers			Benjamin Abalos Jr.	
M/B P. Oreta			In service		36 passengers			Prospero Oreta	
M/B Bridgetowne			Unknown					Bridgetowne	
M/B E. Carlos			Unknown					Emerson Carlos	
M/B B. Fernando			Unknown					Bayani Fernando	

4 vessels used and operated by the MMDA are notably named after past MMDA chairpersons.

=== Former fleet ===
The system formerly used twin-hulled, double-engine catamaran-type ships with a maximum seating capacity of 150 people. These ships were air-conditioned, had restrooms, equipped with radio, sound systems, a public address system, and utilized fixed plastic chairs. These boats were constructed by the Nautical Transport Services, Inc, and were approved by the Maritime Industry Authority on December 10, 2006.

The 2014 iteration of the Pasig River Ferry System operated 14 Manta boats manufactured by the Cebu-based Stordal Marine Corporation. Each boat can carry 15 passengers each.

The Pasig river also formerly operated boats known as River buses, which notably featured Minibus bodies derived from the Baby Buses of Cavite.

== Incidents ==
- Some ferry stations have been subject to short or long periods of suspended operations due to a high volume of water hyacinths along the Pasig River.
- On February 5, 2010, an upstream Pasig River Ferry catamaran boat tilted to its port side at Valenzuela ferry station, causing the boat to become half-submerged. A PCG detachment in Hospicio de San Jose was able to dispatch divers to the vessel and assisted in transferring 139 passengers and three crew members to another Pasig River Ferry boat. The damaged boat was then moored and ordered for repairs. After water was pumped out, a 10 inches (25 cm) crack was reportedly found on its left front side fiberglass hull.

== See also ==
- Pasig River Expressway
- Water taxi
- Maritime Industry Authority
- Pasig River Rehabilitation Commission
- Department of Transportation (Philippines)
- Metropolitan Manila Development Authority
- Pasig river rehabilitation
