= Pasig River Expressway =

Cancelled limited-access toll highway in Metro Manila, Philippines

Route information
- Length: 19.365 km (12.033 mi) excluding the 2.70 km (1.68 mi) portion of Skyway Stage 3
- Status: Cancelled (2023); Resumed (May 2024)

Major junctions
- West end: AH26 (Radial Road 10) in Manila
- East end: E2 (Southeast Metro Manila Expressway) in Taytay, Rizal

Location
- Country: Philippines
- Municipalities: Taytay
- Major cities: Manila, Mandaluyong, Makati, Pasig, Taguig

Highway system
- Roads in the Philippines; Highways; Expressways; List

The Pasig River Expressway (PAREX) was a proposed elevated expressway in Metro Manila, Philippines skirting the banks of the Pasig River and connecting the cities of Manila, Mandaluyong, Makati, Pasig, Taguig and the municipality of Taytay. The expressway is proposed to alleviate east-west traffic congestion in Metro Manila. It is envisioned as a joint venture between the Philippine National Construction Corporation and the San Miguel Corporation. The project broke ground on September 24, 2021, while construction of the expressway was yet to start, pending the approval of its Environmental Compliance Certificate (ECC). The project was deemed cancelled in 2024 due to public uproar against the project. However, Ramon Ang announced renewed interest in the project, albeit citing the need to adjust it toward public sentiment.

== Route description ==
The expressway is planned to start from Radial Road 10 in Manila and is proposed to end at the Southeast Metro Manila Expressway in the municipality of Taytay. Three segments are planned, in addition to utilizing the portion of the Skyway Stage 3 from Plaza Azul (Nagtahan) to San Juan River in Manila.

Segment	Coverage	Kilometers
Segment 1	Radial Road 10 to Plaza Azul	5.74
MMSS3	Plaza Azul to San Juan River	2.70
Segment 2	San Juan River to C-5 Intersection	7.32
Segment 3	C-5 Intersection to C-6 Intersection	6.30

From Manila in the west, the expressway is planned to travel through the southern bank of the Pasig River. It would turn to the land in Paco, where it is proposed to use the right-of-way of Paz Mendoza-Guazon Street and Quirino Avenue before meeting Skyway Stage 3's Nagtahan Exit at Plaza Azul. Its utilization of Skyway's segment starts at the Plaza Dilao Exit and ends at the future San Juan Intersection with Skyway Stage 3 above the San Juan River. From there, it would resume and cut through Punta, Santa Ana, Manila before retaking the Pasig River alignment at the southern bank up to the future Southeast Metro Manila Expressway/C-6 in Taytay, Rizal.

== History ==
Plans to build an expressway over the Pasig River were revealed as early as 1993 when the Japan International Cooperation Agency (JICA) conducted a study on the proposed urban expressway system in Metro Manila. The proposed expressway over the river was called Expressway Route R-4, referring to the proposed new alignment of Radial Road 4 that would run from the proposed Inner Circumferential Expressway (Circumferential Road 3) in Santa Ana, Manila to Circumferential Road 6 in Taguig. In the 1999 Metro Manila Urban Transport Integrated Study, the expressway was also proposed as the R-4 Expressway, with a 12.5-kilometer (7.8 mi) route from the Metro Manila Skyway, extending toward the southeast, and being connected to the C-6 to serve traffic demand between Manila CBD and northern Laguna de Bay. A partially elevated 6-lane Pasig Expressway, measuring 16.55 km (10.28 mi) in length and beginning at the intersection of Ayala Avenue and Gil Puyat Avenue in Makati and ending at the intersection of C-6 and Ortigas Avenue, was proposed by the joint venture of Strategic Alliance Development Corporation (STRADEC), Marubeni, and Kumagai Gumi under the build-operate transfer (BOT) scheme arrangement that same year.

First proposed circa 2017 as the Manila–Taguig Expressway (MTEX), a project of Citra Group and PT Citra Persada Infrastruktur, the expressway is planned as a viaduct over the Pasig River and Laguna de Bay, and a network of bridges similar to the proposed Metro Manila Skybridge. The expressway would have had three segments and two- to six-lane viaducts and bridges. The overall length of the expressway would have been 19.365 kilometers (12.033 mi). The project has an estimated cost of ₱95.413 billion and an estimated implementation period of 36 months. The expressway is also said to undertake river dredging and cleanup works on the Pasig River before, during, and after construction.

In September 2021, the San Miguel Corporation named Filipino green architect Felino "Jun" Palafox as a prospective consultant to introduce "green architectural and urban features" in the Pasig River Expressway system. Initially denying his involvement, Palafox later confirmed his involvement in the project, emphasizing the need for a "missing link for the eastern and western parts of Metro Manila".

The project's technical aspects and financial aspects were approved by the Toll Regulatory Board on July 14, and a public scoping was held by the Department of Environment and Natural Resources (DENR) on the same day. The project scoping report indicated that 101 representatives were present at the scoping, most of which had raised concerns about the project's environmental impacts and a lack of information on the project's detailed engineering designs. The report stated that each concern was responded to with a promise for a follow-up public scoping in October 2021.

On September 21, 2021, the Supplemental Toll Operations Agreement (STOA) was approved by the government, wherein a formal agreement was signed between the San Miguel Corporation, the Department of Transportation, and the Department of Public Works and Highways at a groundbreaking ceremony held on September 24, 2021.

On March 14, 2022, the STOA was approved by the Office of the President. A follow-up project scoping was later held on March 25, 2022.

Construction of the expressway was expected to begin in 2022 and be complete by 2023, pending President Bongbong Marcos's signature to start construction. However, as of 2023, construction has not yet begun, pending regulatory requirements.

In December 2023, a column in The Philippine Star stated that Ramon Ang had decided to drop the proposed Pasig River Expressway project due to public criticism. This was confirmed when Ang stated in a press conference on March 18, 2024, that the project had been shelved, wishing to respect public opinion. Ang's cancellation is reported to have been rescinded following renewed interest in the project.

According to the Toll Regulatory Board Executive Director Alvin A. Carullo, the P81.53-billion PAREX "is still on the table" for further evaluation in its final engineering design process. On May 27, 2024, in a PSE disclosure, Ang announced the company is still conducting a viability study of the project. "We cannot [withdraw], We are addressing the concerns, but it is currently on hold," he explained.

In October 2025, urban planner Paolo Alcazaren stated that elevated expressways "never work" in a sustainable urban context. He identified induced demand as the primary reason for their failure, noting that while the main thoroughfares might see temporary relief, the increased capacity attracts more vehicles that eventually clog the on-and-off ramps. As an alternative to the expressway, Alcazaren proposed the Pasig River Esplanade (PARES), a pedestrian-centric linear park system designed to prioritize public transport and active mobility. Since then, the intended project has not advanced.

== Criticism and concerns ==
=== Environmental and mobility concerns ===
Transport and environmental advocates in April and July 2021 opposed the project, citing environmental concerns that the concrete megastructure would hamper the river's control of floods and contribute to the urban heat island effect, which would have worsened urban heat in Metro Manila.

Concerns were raised that building the Pasig River Expressway would also introduce air and noise pollution in the area, as well as non-exhaust emissions, such as microplastics from car tires, road dust, and particulate matter that would have worsened the pollution in the Pasig River and the communities around it. Advocates also pointed out that constructing more new roads would only worsen traffic congestion by attracting more vehicle use, thus decreasing mobility in a phenomenon called induced demand.

Among the figures who opposed the expressway's construction is Senator Manny Pacquiao, who envisioned developing the sides of the Pasig River into a tourist spot if elected President in the 2022 Philippine presidential elections. Labor lawyer Luke Espiritu and environmentalist David D'Angelo, both under the senatorial slate of Partido Lakas ng Masa, have also called for rejecting the project.

=== Heritage concerns ===
The Intramuros Administration and heritage advocates also opposed the project, noting that the alignment of the project, particularly Segment 1 from Radial Road 10 to Plaza Azul, would transverse multiple heritage sites and historical buildings such as the Intramuros fortifications, Fort Santiago, the Aduana Building, the Bureau of Immigrations building, the National Press Club building, and the Manila Central Post Office. Both parties raised concerns about the project's proximity to these heritage sites, as advocates noted that the project would not only disrupt the visual integrity of these heritage sites but also damage the structural integrity of these landmarks due to vibrations caused by construction.

=== Issues during public scoping ===
Mobility advocates have urged the DENR to postpone the second public scoping that was held on March 25, 2022, citing concerns that the first project scoping held last July 14, 2021, was not carried out correctly and should be invalidated, noting several inaccuracies and deficiencies in the project briefing materials. Advocates also noted the absence of key agencies such as the National Commission for Culture and the Arts, the National Historical Commission of the Philippines, the Department of Tourism, the Department of Science and Technology, and the Philippine Institute of Volcanology and Seismology at the previous public scoping, declaring the need to hold a new public scoping meeting that would have included the inputs of the mentioned agencies. In April 2022, the Intramuros Administration also informed the Environmental Management Bureau under the DENR that it had not been consulted about the project before the public hearing.

Discrepancies between the project alignment shown during the project scoping and in the environmental impact assessment (EIA) report were also raised, as 20 per cent of the total alignment shown during the first project scoping has been modified in the EIA report. Advocates raised that stakeholders in these areas were not properly notified and informed of these changes, noting that the informed consent of these stakeholders is missing from the EIA report.

==== Environmental impact assessment plagiarism ====
In April 2022, it was found out that the EIA report for the project contained entire sections that were plagiarized from the environmental impact assessments of the Makati Intra-city Subway in 2019 and a coal-fired power station expansion project in Misamis Oriental in 2017 and the project components section of the Cavite–Laguna Expressway. In response, advocates have petitioned the Environmental Management Bureau to investigate RHR Consulting Services, the company responsible for the preparation of the report, for any findings of misconduct and irregular practice present in the drafting of the EIA report.

=== Response ===
The issues with the expressway were responded to by San Miguel Corporation President Ramon Ang, who emphasized the fact that the project would be at no cost to the government, dispelled misinformation suggesting that the expressway would cover the whole Pasig River instead of being built along it, and mentioned parallel plans to rehabilitate the river by widening and dredging the river at certain points. In response to concerns about induced demand, Ang responded that the project would not be exclusive to private car owners as it would also have a bus rapid transit system, bike lanes, and pedestrian infrastructure

Advocates indicated, however, that whether or not the project would be built along or above the river is irrelevant as the project itself would be inviting air pollution into a corridor that previously did not have any. Mobility advocates also questioned Ang's mention of including a bus rapid transit system, bike lanes, and pedestrian infrastructure in response to criticism, as these features were not detailed in the project's EIA report. Alcazaren also agreed that the elevated nature of the proposed bus rapid transit system, bike lanes, and pedestrian infrastructure would pose accessibility and connectivity issues.

The project's "unusually fast" approval process was also criticized, given the approval of the STOA despite the lack of an Environmental Compliance Certificate (ECC) from the DENR, which is needed before any construction can start. On June 27, 2023, DENR secretary Toni Yulo-Loyzaga stated that the DENR is currently evaluating the community impact of the Pasig River Expressway project and stated that there is still no timeframe for the issuance of an ECC for the project.

Green architect Jun Palafox, who initially denied involvement with the project in September 2021, has since been onboarded, committing to develop it according to "his own vision of Pasig River development". Palafox has also responded to the criticism, denying that the expressway would only cause additional congestion if built, believing there is an "unmet demand" for an east-west transportation corridor. Palafox's involvement with the project has also been seen as a complete reversal of his long-standing principles for revitalizing decades of urban decay in Metro Manila with sustainable practices.

== Exits ==
Exits and intersections are proposed to be numbered by kilometer posts and station, starting from the R-10 intersection designated as Kilometer 0. However, station markers of Segment 2 from San Juan to C-5 Intersection apparently designate Rizal Park as Kilometer 0.

Region	Province	City/Municipality	km	mi	Exit	Name	Destinations	Notes
Metro Manila	Manila		0.000	0.000		R-10	AH26 (Mel Lopez Boulevard)	T-interchange; western terminus and start of Segment 1
Metro Manila	Manila					U-Belt	N180 (Circumferential Road 1)	Half diamond interchange; westbound-only entrance and exit
Metro Manila	Manila		5.740	3.567		Plaza Azul	Skyway	Y-interchange with Metro Manila Skyway; end of Segment 1
Metro Manila	Manila				Metro Manila Skyway alignment from Plaza Dilao to San Juan River			
Metro Manila	Manila		5.360– 8.440	3.331– 5.244		San Juan	N141 (Tomas Claudio Street) / Skyway	Y-interchange with Metro Manila Skyway; start of Segment 2
Metro Manila	Makati					Makati	F. Zobel Street	Eastbound-only entrance
Metro Manila	Mandaluyong					Mandaluyong	Coronado Street / Makati–Mandaluyong Bridge	Westbound-only entrance
Metro Manila	Makati					Rockwell	J.P. Rizal Avenue	Half diamond interchange; westbound-only entrance and eastbound-only exit
Metro Manila	Taguig–Pasig boundary		11.310	7.028		BGC	Lawton Avenue / J.P. Rizal Avenue – BGC	Half diamond interchange; eastbound-only exit and westbound-only entrance
Metro Manila	Taguig–Pasig boundary		15.765	9.796		C-5	N11 (Circumferential Road 5)	Eastbound-only half diamond interchange with elevated u-turn slots; end of Segment 2 and start of Segment 3;
Calabarzon	Rizal	Taytay	22.065	13.711		SEMME (C-6)	E2 (Southeast Metro Manila Expressway)	Y-interchange with the Southeast Metro Manila Expressway; end of Segment 3; eastern terminus
1.000 mi = 1.609 km; 1.000 km = 0.621 mi: Unopened

== See also ==
- Pasig River Ferry Service
- Rehabilitation of the Pasig River
