= Makati Intra-city Subway =

Cancelled railway project in Metro Manila, Philippines

Overview
- Other name: Makati Subway
- Status: Cancelled
- Owner: Makati City Government
- Locale: Makati
- Termini: Ayala EDSA; Comembo
- Stations: 9

Service
- Type: Rapid transit
- System: Manila Metro Rail Transit System
- Services: 1
- Operator(s): Philippine Infradev Holdings, Inc.
- Rolling stock: Electric multiple units
- Daily ridership: 500,000 (projected)

Technical
- Line length: 10.1 km (6.3 mi)
- Character: Underground
- Track gauge: 1,435 mm (4 ft 8 1/2 in) standard gauge
- Minimum radius: 300 m (980 ft)
- Electrification: 1,500 V DC overhead lines
- Operating speed: 80 km/h (50 mph)

The Makati Intra-city Subway (MkTr) was a planned underground rapid transit line to be located in Makati, Metro Manila, that will link establishments across the city's business district. Its construction was planned through a public-private partnership program between the Makati City Government and a private consortium headed by Philippine Infradev Holdings. Proponents of the subway were expected to begin construction by December 2018, and Makati Mayor Abigail Binay projects completion by 2025. The subway costed $1.8 billion (or ₱90 billion) and was expected to accommodate 500,000 passengers daily. It would have had seven stations, with connections to the existing MRT Line 3 and Pasig River Ferry Service.

The Makati Intra-city Subway was designed to complement the Metro Manila Subway (MMS), a national government project under the Department of Transportation (DOTr). Plans included interconnections between the two systems to facilitate seamless transfers for commuters. Specifically, the MkTr was expected to link with the MMS at the proposed University of Makati (UMak) station.

Construction of this project was initially put on hold after the transfer of jurisdiction of the ten EMBO barangays from Makati to Taguig was finalized in 2023. This is because its planned depot and some stations were intended to be located in the formerly disputed area, according to the original proposed alignment, thus requiring a reworking. However the project was cancelled following Infradev's withdrawal in May 2025.

== Route ==
The line would have been 10.1 kilometers (6.3 mi) long with initially 10 stations. The termini would have been at Ayala EDSA station, which has connections with the namesake MRT Line 3 station and One Ayala transport hub, and at Comembo station. Rockwell station, which was to be located near Rockwell Center, was later dropped, reducing the final station count to 9.

List of stations
Station	Connections	Location
Ayala EDSA	Manila MRT: 3 Ayala; EDSA Carousel: 1 Ayala; Bus routes: 10 11 12 38 40 42 45 46 One Ayala	Makati
Ayala Paseo	Bus routes: 10 11 12 38 40 42 45 46 Paseo de Roxas	Makati
Makati Fire Station	Bus routes: 4 10 11 12 38 40 42 45 46 Ayala Avenue	Makati
Circuit		Makati
Makati City Hall		Makati
Guadalupe	Manila MRT: 3 Guadalupe; EDSA Carousel: 1 Guadalupe; Pasig River Ferry Service: Guadalupe Ferry Station	Makati
University of Makati	Metro Manila Subway: MMS Kalayaan	Taguig
Buting		Taguig
Comembo		Taguig

== History ==
=== Early planning ===
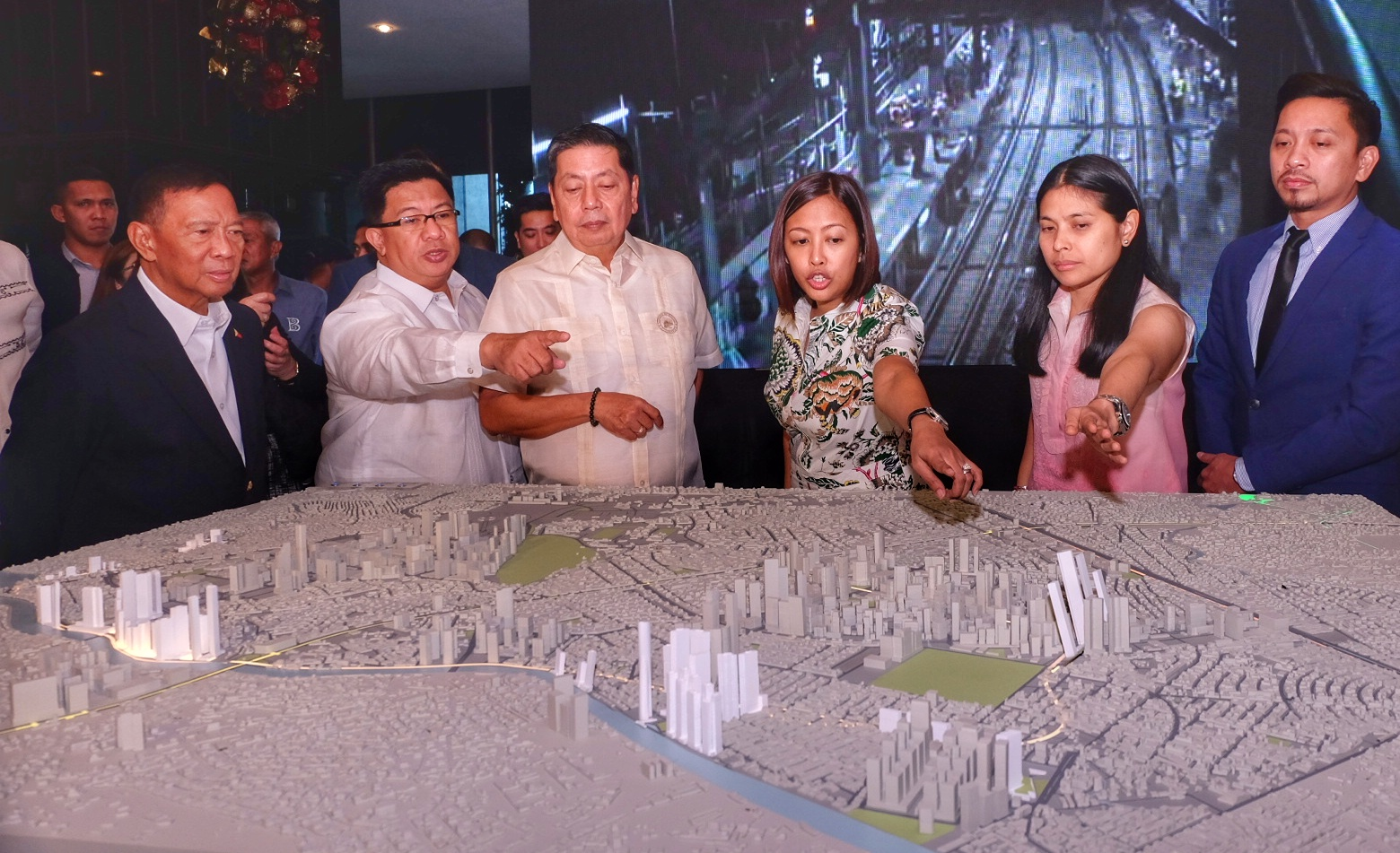
Former Vice President Jejomar Binay (left), Makati Mayor Abigail Binay (third from right), Vice Mayor Monique Lagdameo (second from right), and 1st District Councilors Luis Javier Jr. (second from left) and Jhong Hilario (right) viewing the scale model of the planned Makati City Subway project at the Makati City Hall on December 12, 2018

In 2015, the National Economic and Development Authority approved the construction of the Makati-Pasay-Taguig Mass Transit System Loop, which would have been a 20-kilometer-long underground railway from Bonifacio Global City to Taft Avenue. The project was to be funded through the PPP scheme, but after former President Benigno Aquino III stepped down from office, the project was later shelved.

Preparatory work officially began on December 12, 2018, following a ceremonial drilling ceremony at the front of the Makati City Hall, which is near the site of one of the supposed stations of the subway. The signing of the memorandum of understanding between the Makati city government and a consortium consisting of Philippine Infradev and Chinese firms Greenland Holdings Group, Jiangsu Provincial Construction Group Co. Ltd., Holdings Ltd., and China Harbour Engineering Company Ltd. were also held on the same day. Preparatory work included soil testing and feasibility studies of the proposed locations for the subway line's stations.

By June 2019, 8 out of the 10 proposed stations had been finalized. The two proposed stations along Ayala Avenue had not been finalized due to "non-response" from their owners. The proponents had stated that they might divert the subway toward the Philippine National Railways Buendia station or the Mile Long property in Legazpi Village instead. In the interim, the first station would have been in the current location of the Makati Central Fire Station, which was to be demolished, and then towards a Lucio Tan-owned property near Circuit Makati and the Makati City Hall. The remaining stations would have been located near Century City, Rockwell Center, Guadalupe Bliss Housing in Cembo, BGC-Ortigas Link Bridge, University of Makati and the final station in the vicinity of Ospital ng Makati.

In July 2019, soil testing related to the subway completed as Philippine Infradev and the Makati government had signed a joint venture agreement for the project

By October 2019, the plan to move the terminus of the line to the Mile Long property being redeveloped by the national government along Amorsolo Street had been finalized. Favorable soil test results and the route diversion meant that the cost of the project might go down to as low as $2.5 billion.

A joint venture with Megaworld Corp. was formed to build a common station located in Guadalupe for the subway system and for the planned SkyTrain. In a disclosure to the stock exchange, the Philippine Infradev wholly owned subsidiary, Makati City Subway Inc. (MCSI) had received the term sheet from Megaworld. The joint venture would have built access and connections to the MRT Guadalupe Station and the Pasig River Ferry.

=== Construction ===
Philippine Infradev Holdings, Inc. received an Environmental Compliance Certificate (ECC) from the Department of Environment and Natural Resources (DENR) and is looking to commence works before the year 2020. If pushed through, the subway may be completed in 2024, a year ahead of schedule.

On July 20, 2020, the EPC contract was signed and awarded to China Construction Second Engineering Bureau Ltd. (CCSEB) and Shanghai Electric Automation Group for the subway line's construction. Former Philippine Vice President Jejomar Binay and Makati Mayor Abigail Binay delivered their speeches via video conference as gratitude for the project. On July 23, 2020, the right-of-way acquisition has commenced for the project, of which 55 landowners received a total of ₱1,000,000 (US$20,270) as compensation. The affected landowners will receive a total compensation of ₱1.18 billion (US$23.9 million).

On August 18, 2020, groundbreaking for the Station 3's transit-oriented development took place, where former parking lots and transport terminal used to stand. To recall, Philippine Infradev executed an agreement with China Construction First Group Corp. Ltd. (CCFG) to build the Station 3's transit-oriented development. Construction will last for 42 months.

Acquisition of properties was conficted in the vicinity of Makati City Hall, as several homes and structures were closed and demolished. The vicinity, also known as Station 5, was identified as the project's main construction site, where the tunnel boring machine was to be assembled and lowered. On October 25, 2020, a city ordinance was enacted to approve and hasten the Right-of-Way acquisition.

On May 14, 2021, the first of five tunnel boring machine was received by the Philippine Infradev Chairman Ren Jinhua in Shanghai, China from its manufacturer. It will arrive in the country once the Station 5 construction site was demolished and cleared up.

On November 8, 2021, the Fiscal Incentives Review Board (FIRB) approved the grant of tax incentives for subway's operations.

=== Cancellation ===
With Makati losing ten barangays to Taguig in a territorial dispute between the two cities in 2023, the subway alignment will need to be reworked because its depot and a few stations were in the affected areas.

In an interview with the Philippine Daily Inquirer, Makati Mayor Abigail Binay mentioned that there have been talks with the private proponents on planning on a different transportation initiative as the subway project is no longer viable to proceed.

In August 2024, an audit of the project revealed ₱44 billion in losses in 2023. Following the transfer of disputed territory to Taguig, Infradev incurred ₱5 billion for its subway unfinished work and ₱39 billion for intangible assets, while the project was suspended after five stations went under Taguig's jurisdiction. Infradev managed to complete the excavation and shoring works of Yakal (Makati Fire Station) station on a lot bounded by Gil Puyat Avenue, Dela Rosa Street, Urban Avenue, and Amorsolo Street. On May 2, 2025, InfraDev announced it was exiting its joint agreement venture with the Makati city government. In response, the Makati government said it was searching for another partner for the project.

In July 2025, newly installed Makati Mayor Nancy Binay flagged a deal she described as a "midnight settlement," entered by the administration of her sister and predecessor Abigail Binay on June 23, 2025, obligating the city to pay ₱8.96 billion to Philippine InfraDev Holdings Inc. The Singapore International Arbitration Center (SIAC) obligated the city to pay within 90 days, while a $30 million penalty plus interest will be imposed if the city misses the payment deadline. However, due to the cancellation of the Makati City Subway Project, the city could not pay the amount according to Nancy. Abigail asserted that the city had funds of nearly ₱30 billion before leaving office, implying that the city could settle the subway project obligations.

In January 2026, the Makati City Council passed Resolution Nos. 2026-008 and 2026-011, authorizing and ratifying a settlement agreement intended to permanently resolve all claims related to the joint venture between Infradev and the Makati City Government. The agreement was signed on January 20, 2026, by Makati city officials and Infradev's Youmin Ren. Thus, the city government has assumed full ownership of the project.

== Fares and ticketing ==
The upcoming line was to use a distance-based fare structure and would have charged 20% to 25% higher than the fares of LRT Line 1 and MRT Line 3. A 25 percent premium would have brought the subway's rate to about ₱38 (69 U.S. cents) for 10 stops.

== Infrastructure ==
=== Station layout ===
All stations would have had a standard layout, with a concourse level and a platform level. The stations were designed to be barrier-free. All stations would have had island platforms with full-height platform screen doors.

=== Rolling stock ===
The line was to operate electric multiple units in a 6-car configuration, with a headway of three minutes.

Rolling stock	Train dimensions
Train length	140 m (459 ft 4 in)
Car length	DM: 24.4 m (80 ft 1 in); M/T: 22.8 m (74 ft 10 in)
Width	3 m (9 ft 10 in)
Height (from top of rail)	3.81 m (12 ft 6 in)
Floor height (from top of rail)	1.13 m (3 ft 8 in)
Configuration	DM–M–T–T–M–DM
Capacity	1,350 passengers
Doors	1,400 mm (4 ft 7 in) sliding
Traction power	1,500 V DC overhead line
Traction control	IGBT–VVVF
Top speed	80 km/h (50 mph)
Safety system(s)	Semi-ATO GoA 2
Gauge	1,435 mm (4 ft 8 1/2 in)
Status	Cancelled

== Expansion ==
In the aftermath of the 2019 elections, Antonio Tiu, President of Philippine Infradev, had stated that he was open to initiating and entering a similar partnership deal with Makati's neighboring cities for the expansion of the subway system. The cities of Manila, Mandaluyong, San Juan, Pasay, and Pasig were specifically mentioned by Tiu.

With the finalized move of the terminus to the Mile Long property, a 2-hectare (4.9-acre) complex along Amorsolo Street, Tiu had started negotiations with the Calixto siblings, Mayor Emi and Congressman Tony, of Pasay to extend the line up to Ninoy Aquino International Airport, which is only three kilometers away from Mile Long and was slated for redevelopment.

== See also ==
- Metro Manila Subway – Future subway line in the Philippines
