= Guadalupe station (MRT) =

Train station in Makati, Philippines

Coordinates: 14°34′00.70″N 121°02′43.68″E

Guadalupe	YL09
- Guadalupe station in October 2026

General information
- Location: EDSA, Guadalupe Viejo & Guadalupe Nuevo; Makati, Metro Manila; Philippines
- Owner: Department of Transportation
- Operator: Department of Transportation
- Line: MRT Line 3
- Platforms: 2 (2 side)
- Tracks: 2
- Connections: E Guadalupe; Guadalupe Ferry Station; Future: 5 Guadalupe

Construction
- Structure type: Elevated
- Cycle facilities: Bicycle racks (Northbound entrance)
- Accessible: Concourse: Northbound and southbound entrances Platforms: All platforms

History
- Opened: December 15, 1999; 26 years ago

Services
Preceding station	Manila MRT	Following station
Boni towards North Avenue	MRT Line 3	Buendia towards Taft Avenue
Track layout
Location

Guadalupe station is an elevated Metro Rail Transit (MRT) station located on the MRT Line 3 (MRT-3) system in Makati. It is named because of its location between the barangays of Guadalupe Nuevo and Guadalupe Viejo, both are in turn named after Our Lady of Guadalupe.

The station is the ninth station for trains headed to Taft Avenue and the fifth station for trains headed to North Avenue. It is the last station of the line south of the Pasig River and before crossing over to Mandaluyong.

== History ==
Guadalupe station was opened on December 15, 1999, as part of MRT's initial section from North Avenue to Buendia.

== Nearby landmarks ==
Guadalupe station is near two major seminaries: the San Carlos Seminary and the Our Lady of Guadalupe Minor Seminary, both of which are staffed by the Roman Catholic Archdiocese of Manila. It is also near the Guadalupe Commercial Complex, a shopping complex and public market connected to the station's concourse, overpass, and northbound (east) entrance by an elevated walkway. Other nearby landmarks include the centuries-old Nuestra Señora de Gracia Church, Loyola Memorial Chapels & Crematorium, parks such as Guadalupe Viejo Cloverleaf Park and Kennely Ann L. Binay Park, and hotels such as Hotel Sogo Yabut, Hotel Sogo EDSA Guadalupe, My Inn Edsa Guadalupe, and Astrotel Hotel Guadalupe. The Makati City Hall and University of Makati are also accessible via J. P. Rizal Avenue. Guadalupe station is also the nearest station to the Rockwell Center, home to the Power Plant Mall.

== Transportation links ==
Passengers can board jeepneys, taxis, buses, and UV Express to various points from the station, including western Makati, Makati Central Business District, Taguig passing through Bonifacio Global City, Pasay, Pasig, Pateros, and southern Manila. Tricycles can be found in areas further away from EDSA that serve locally within Guadalupe. The Guadalupe Pasig River Ferry Station is also located nearby along J.P. Rizal Avenue in Cembo, Taguig. An EDSA Carousel station is located on the nearby Guadalupe Bridge and is accessible through the MRT station's southbound platform.

The station will be adjacent to the upcoming SkyTrain, built by Alliance Global, that will run from this station to Uptown Bonifacio in the northern side of Bonifacio Global City. It will also be connected to the future Guadalupe Station of the planned Makati Intra-city Subway.

== Gallery ==
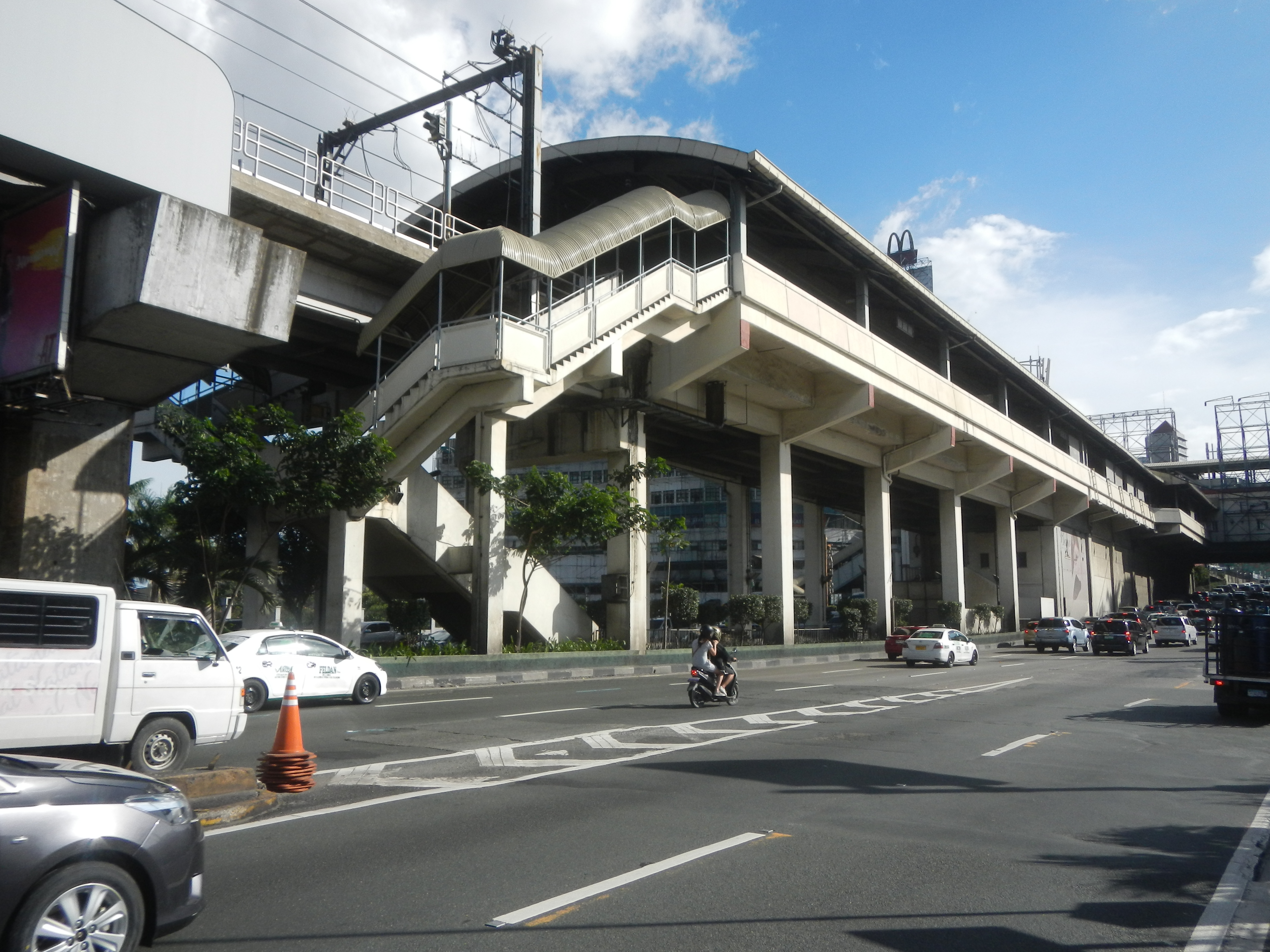
Guadalupe station from street level

Platform 1

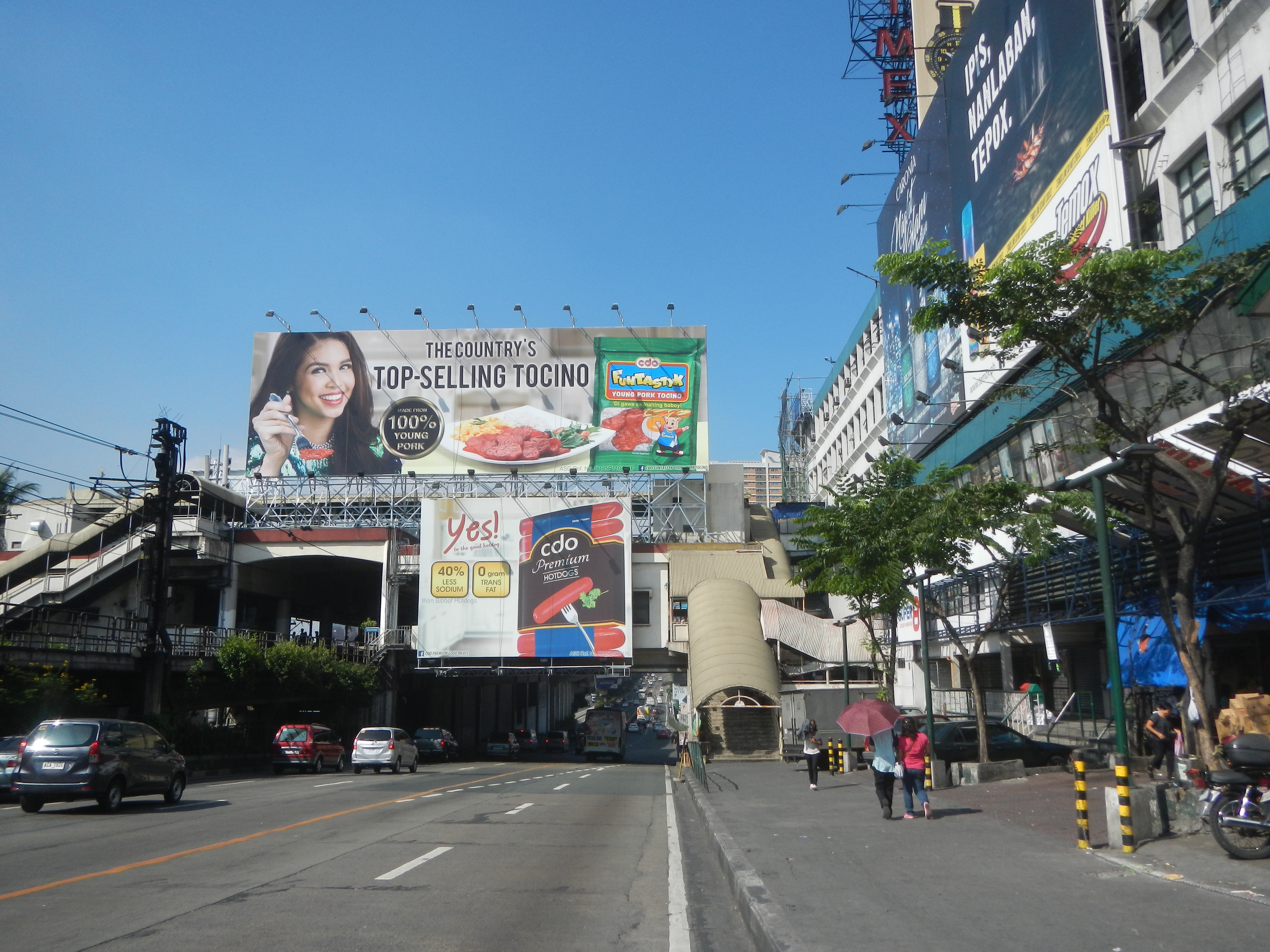
View of the station from the street level at the south

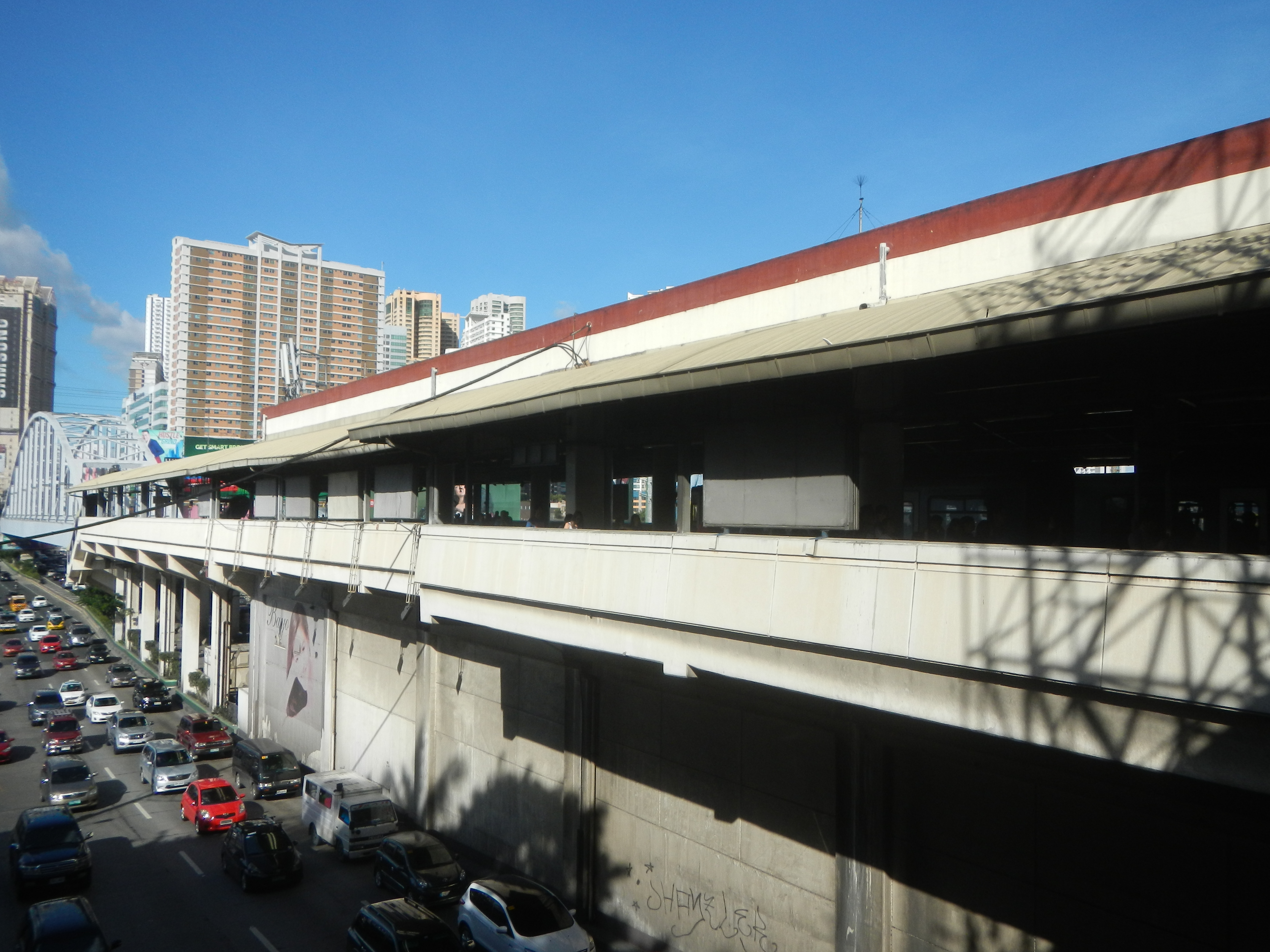
View from concourse level

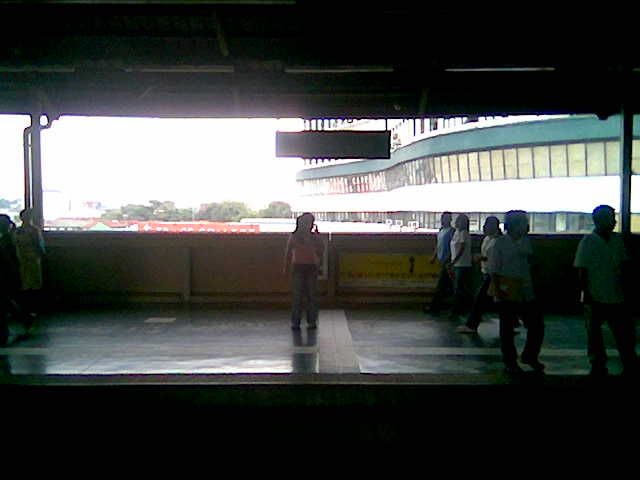
Northbound platform

== See also ==
- List of rail transit stations in Metro Manila
- Manila Metro Rail Transit System Line 3
- Guadalupe Bridge
