= Rehabilitation of the Pasig River =

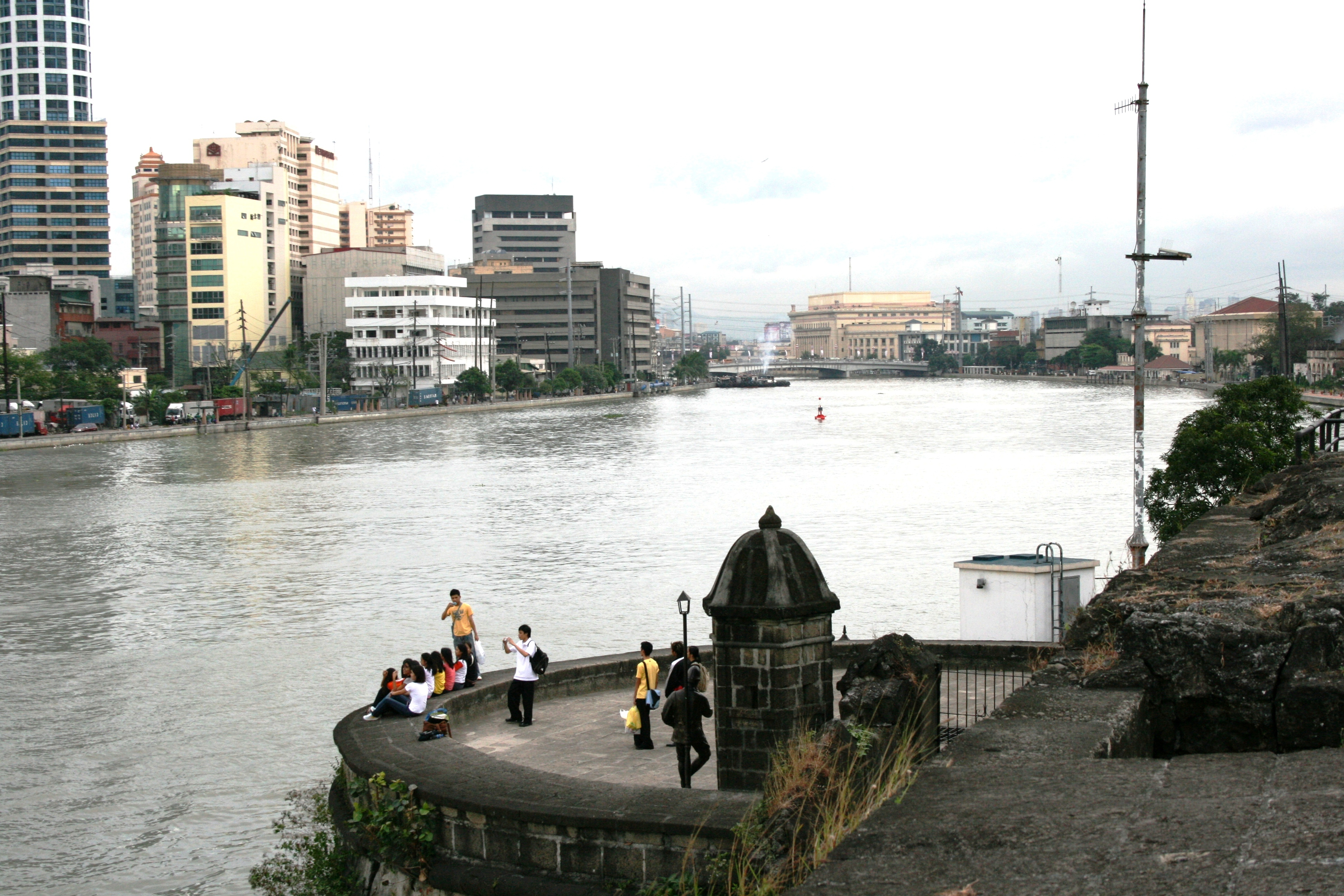
The Pasig River in Manila in 2008

The Pasig River is a river in the Philippines running through the heart of Manila. It flows from Laguna de Bay to Manila Bay for 26 kilometers (16 mi). Its average width is 50 meters (160 ft) and average depth around 4–6 meters (13–20 ft). The river runs through some of the most populated areas in the Philippines.

Throughout history, the river was used as a major source of transportation, water, food, and livelihood for many Manila residents. The river was such an important part of the country that many houses were built alongside its shores. Malacañang Palace, the official residence of the president of the Philippines, is located alongside the river.

In October 2018, the Pasig River Rehabilitation Commission (PRRC) won the first Asia Riverprize, in recognition of its efforts to rehabilitate the Pasig River. According to the PRRC, aquatic life has returned to the river.

== Pollution timeline ==
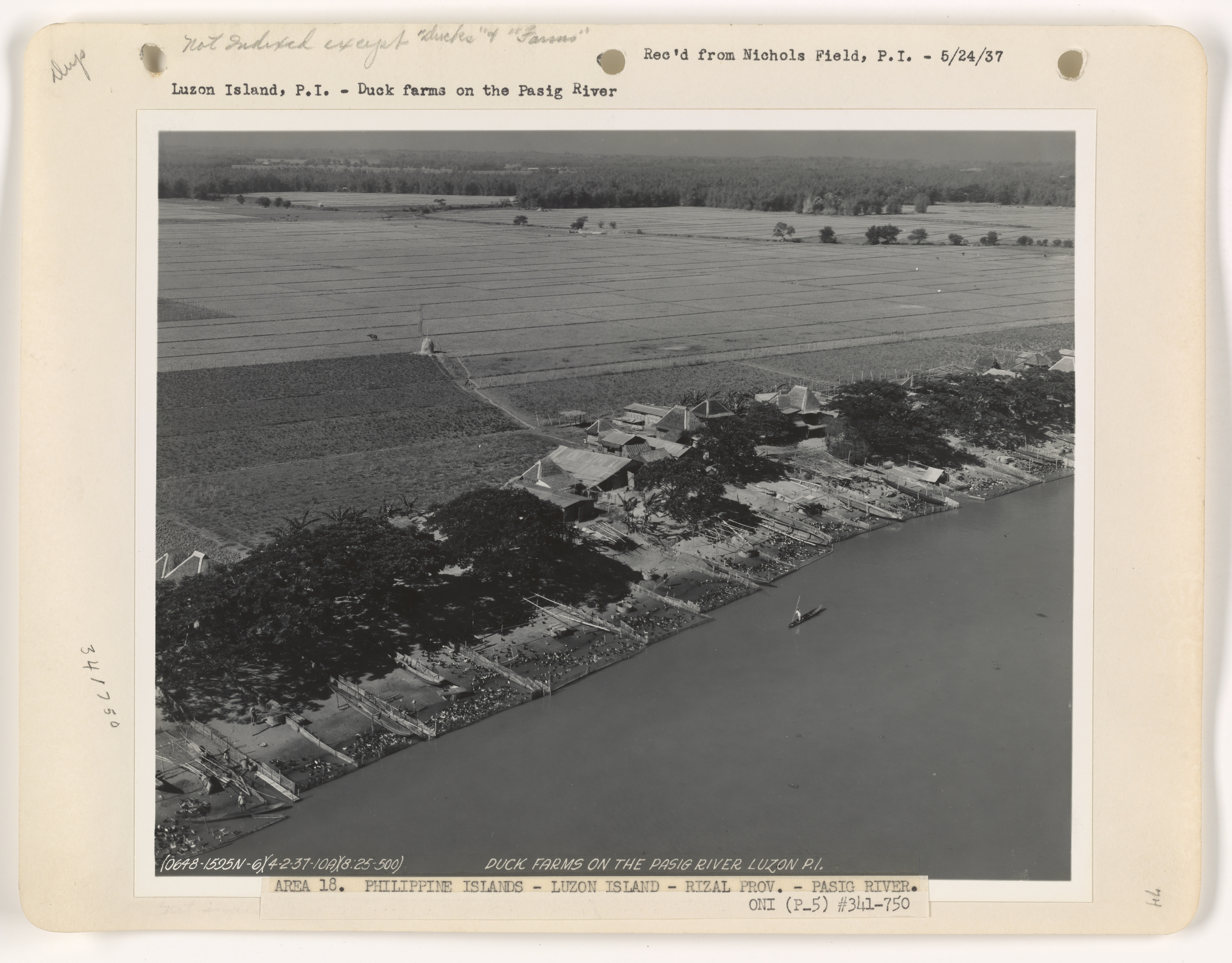
Duck farms along Pasig River, 1937

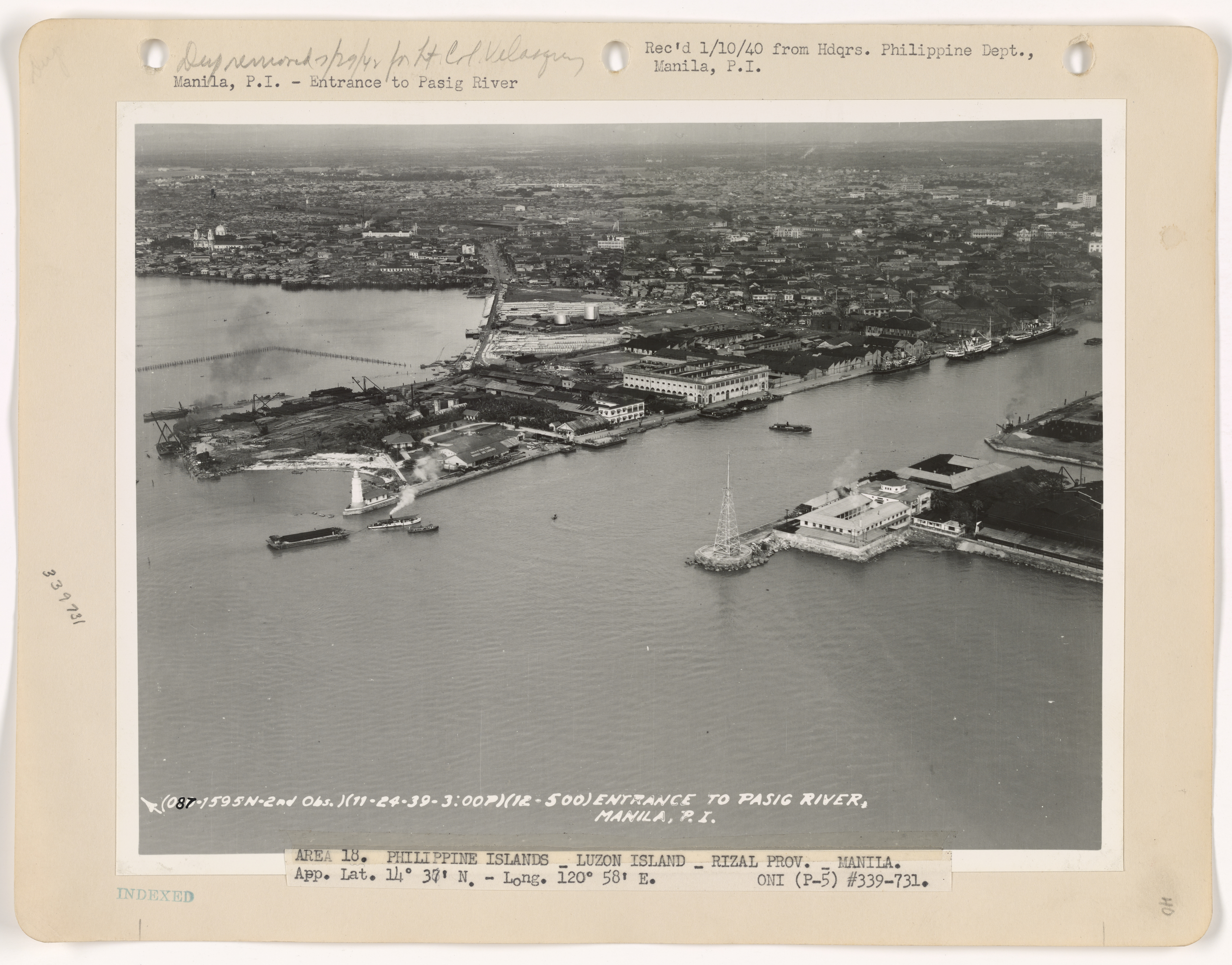
Aerial view of Pasig River mouth, 1940

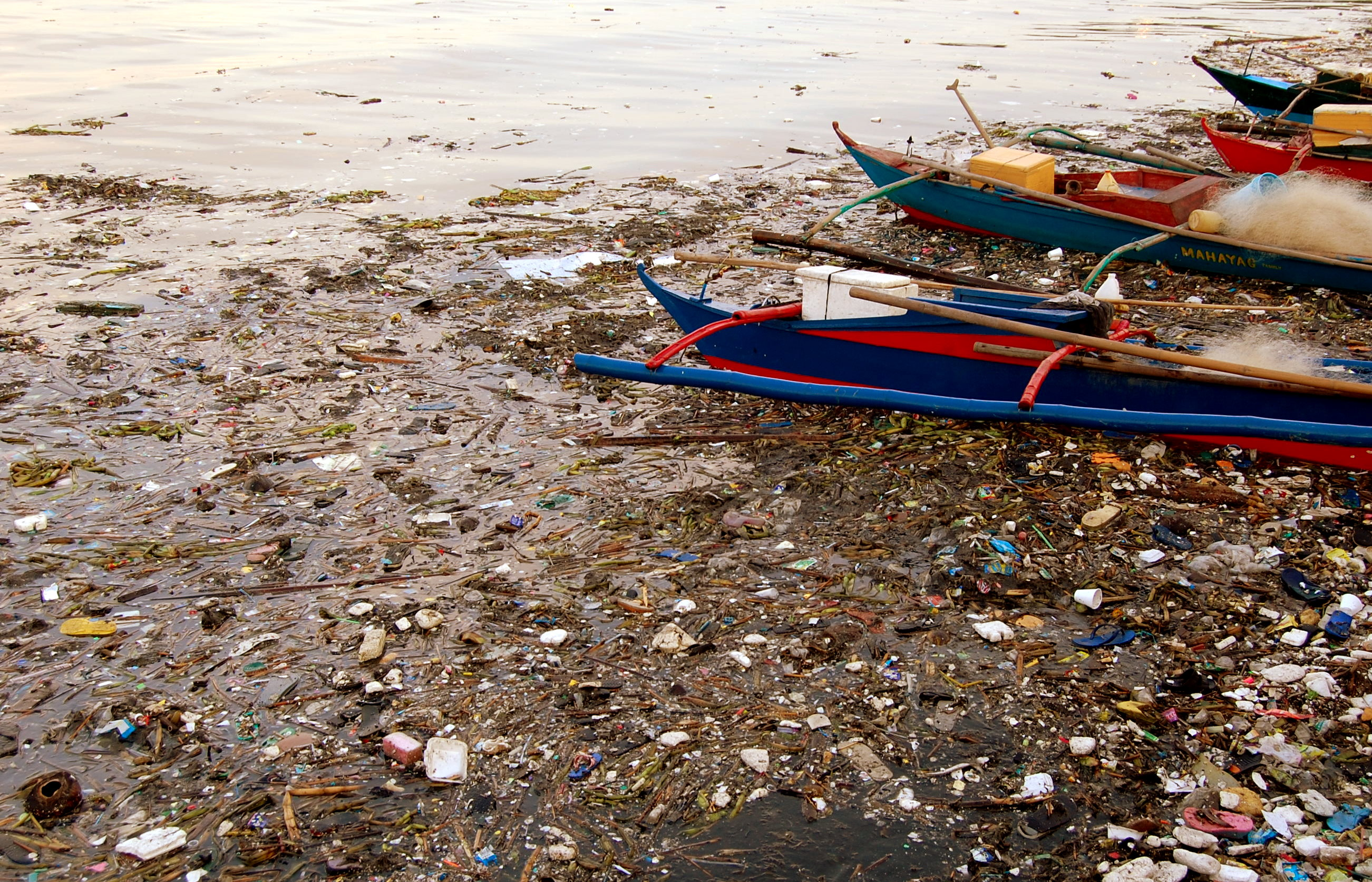
Pollution in Manila Bay in June 2008. Manila Bay is the catchment area of the Pasig and Pampanga River Basins.

After World War II (WWII), the rich began to move away from the shores of the Pasig and many factories took their place. During this time, shanty towns filled with squatters emerged wherever there was room, including on stilts over the river. This caused the lifeline of many Filipinos to be suffocated. Through the years, the problem got progressively worse. It got to the point, in recent years, where mounds of garbage float down the river alongside boats and many of the tributaries became filled with garbage until there was no water left.

- 1930s: Fish migration from Laguna Lake slowed
- 1950s: Bathing activities declined
- 1960s: Washing of clothing was forced to stop and ferry service declined
- 1970s: The river began to give off a smell
- 1980s: All fishing activities were forced to stop
- 1990s: The river was declared biologically dead

=== Shanty towns ===
Many of the people who moved into these post-WWII shanty towns were from the different provinces. These people adventured to Manila to find better jobs and lives; but without opportunities became compelled to settle in shanty towns where the river becomes a lifeline as they cause environmental problems. Houses mostly built on stilts above the river become vulnerable during the rainy season floods, and scrap materials mostly from recycled wood are prone to fires. Resistance to halt evictions of habitations exceedimg the 3m easement created by law along the shores of the river and tributaries are common cases. A number of non-governmental organizations (NGOs) have responded by working with the urban poor to provide help during the rehabilitation of the Pasig.

== Rehabilitation and relocation efforts ==
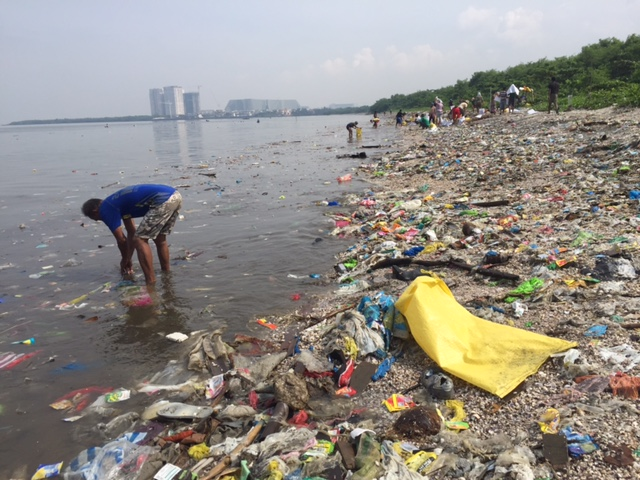
Residents of Freedom Island help Greenpeace and other NGO's in the coastal clean-up in 2017.

Rehabilitation efforts began in 1999 with the help of the Danish International Development Agency (DANIDA). The Asian Development Bank gave the government of the Philippines a loan of $200 million to implement a 15-year slum upgrade program for Metro Manila which includes the rehabilitation of the Pasig River. This loan is under the conditions that the relocation and livelihoods of the illegal squatters have equal importance as the environmental aspect of the rehabilitation.

The overall objective of the rehabilitation is to improve environmental management particularly with waste-water management and urban renewal. There are even talks about using Laguna de Bay for drinking water to supply the growing population of Metro Manila, on the condition that the river and surrounding waterways are cleaned and kept clean. Plans are being implemented for a dike to be built at the entrance to the Pasig River at Laguna de Bay to keep flood waters out during rainy season to prevent major areas of the city from flooding; this is coming under great controversy as the people living around Laguna de Bay would have to deal with flooding.

Because the majority of the people living on the edges of the river are illegal squatters, it is very difficult to monitor the amount of garbage or waste — or to treat either of them. It is estimated that 65% of the waste flowing down the Pasig River is due to these illegal settlement villages. Philippine law states that the government has the legal right to relocate the people in these illegal settlements to 3 m away from the shore of the river. This is under controversy as the government wants people to be 10 m away from the river's edge to ensure that the river stays clean, to add a buffer zone against potential flooding, to create parks and walkways, and to allow access for ships and emergency services.

This was officially changed during the Joseph Estrada administration when the Metropolitan Manila Development Authority (MMDA) changed the law from 3 m to 10 m. This is controversial as the MMDA does not have the authority to change a national law.

During the administration of Fidel V. Ramos, approximately 5000 families were relocated to the suburbs. There are approximately 700,000–750,000 people are being affected by the relocation of illegal settlements along the Pasig River. This includes people who are being relocated away from the shores of Laguna de Bay, the Pasig River, and all of its tributaries. Around 10,000 illegal settlers will be relocated to Calauan, which is on the southern shore of Laguna de Bay. They will be moved into an environmentally friendly housing project. Many others are being relocated to Bulacan, Rodriguez, and Cavite.

The main problem that the government is facing with the relocation is that many of the relocated people move back to Manila into a different shanty town due to the fact that they work in Manila and it is hard to find work in many other places on Luzon. Former Makati Mayor Jejomar Binay stated “Aside from livelihood, there should be transportation assistance”. He is referring to having some sort of assisted transportation for these urban poor so that they can live in the suburbs and work every day in Manila.

The illegal squatters who relocated received financial assistance of P24,240. Those who have opted to be relocated or who have simply been forced to relocate by the government have been relocated to:

1. Kasiglahan Village I: Rodriguez, Rizal
2. Kasiglahan Village II: c5, Taguig City
3. Kasiglahan Village III: Trece Martires, Cavite
4. Kasiglahan Village IV & V: General Trias
5. Villa San Isidro: Rodriguez, Rizal
6. Jaime Cardinal Sin Village: Santa Ana, Manila

On April 20, 2021, San Miguel Corporation announced that the river cleanup will begin in May 2021. SMC will also work with the Department of Environment and Natural Resources and the Department of Public Works and Highways in this river cleanup. The river cleanup is part of San Miguel Corporation's ₱95-billion Pasig River Expressway project.

=== Barangay Pineda ===
One of the areas that the government has been receiving the most trouble is in Barangay Pineda. In September 2000, the government came in to relocate all of the illegal settlers but the settlers fought back stabbing and killing one of the demolition workers. After this event, no more families were to be relocated as the Asian Development Bank threatened to refuse their loans to the government if relocation efforts did not improve, including the people who were already moved.

The people in Barangay Pineda were awarded the right to purchase the land they were on at a subsidized rate and the government implemented sewage facilities, better drainage, and roads to ensure that the river stayed clean.

Due to the success at Barangay Pineda, many other communities of illegal settlers are now fighting for the same rights that were awarded to Barangay Pineda. This can be seen in places such as Baseco, where the same rights were given and better services were implemented.

== Rehabilitation management ==
In January 6, 1999, the Pasig River Rehabilitation Commission was created under Executive Order No. 54 to rehabilitate the river for recreation, transportation, and tourism.

The PRRC was in charge of overseeing all rehabilitative actions on the Pasig River. It managed the "river warriors" that patrol for polluters and squatters, clean the Pasig River and connecting esteros, add new plants along the river banks, ensure that the 10 m environmentally preservation areas are created, floating barriers are installed to ensure garbage is not sent down the river, monitor the water quality in the river and esteros to ensure that the water is Class "C", etc.

Class "C" refers to water that can sustain the propagation and growth of fish and other aquatic life, water then can be used for recreational purposes including boating, and industrial water that can be used for industrial purposes after treatment.

In November 8, 2019, the commission was abolished, and its responsibilities were transferred to the Manila Bay Task Force, the Department of Environment and Natural Resources, the Department of Human Settlements and Urban Development, the Metropolitan Manila Development Authority and the Department of Public Works and Highways.

On July 25, 2023, President Bongbong Marcos issued Executive Order No. 35 creating the Inter-Agency Council for the Pasig River Urban Development (IAC-PRUD). On August 13, 2025, President Marcos Jr. has issued Executive Order 92, creating the Office of the Presidential Adviser on Pasig River Rehabilitation (OPAPRR) and is headed by the Presidential Adviser for Pasig River Rehabilitation (PAPRR) with the rank of a Secretary. The Presidential Adviser serves as the chair of the IAC-PRUD, the Metro Manila Development Authority Chair serves as Vice-Chair while members include the Secretaries of the Department of Human Settlements and Urban Development (DHSUD), Department of Public Works and Highways (DPWH), Department of Environment and Natural Resources (DENR), Department of the Interior and Local Government (DILG), Department of Labor and Employment, Department of Tourism (DOT), Department of Transportation (DOTr), Department of Finance (DOF), and the Department of Budget and Management (DBM). Jerry Acuzar was appointed as Presidential Adviser for Pasig River Rehabilitation.

=== Pasig River Esplanade ===
President Marcos inaugurated on January 17, 2024, the Pasig River Esplanade, the first phase of the P18-billion Pasig River Urban Development of the Rehabilitation of the Pasig River. The Inter-Agency Council for the Pasig River Urban Development (IAC-PRUD) per Jose Acuzar announced that it will build 8 more esplanades in other parts of the 25-kilometer river. The 500-metre (1,600 ft) embankment behind the Manila Central Post Office features the promenade which will be 25 kilometres (16 mi) long on each side of the Pasig River. Acuzar further said that the promenade would lead to a 150-hectare (370-acre) park in Rizal that may be called "Marcos Park".

In June, 2024, Marcos Jr. officially opened the Eplanade's Pasig River Urban Development Showcase Area (PRUDP), Phase 2 1C, a 250-meter stretch that connects Jones Bridge to Plaza Mexico at Magallanes Drive. Located behind the Manila Central Post Office, it features a 250 meters by three-meter wide boardwalk with a roof deck and bike lane from Plaza Mexico to Fort Santiago.

Manila Central Post Office Esplanade

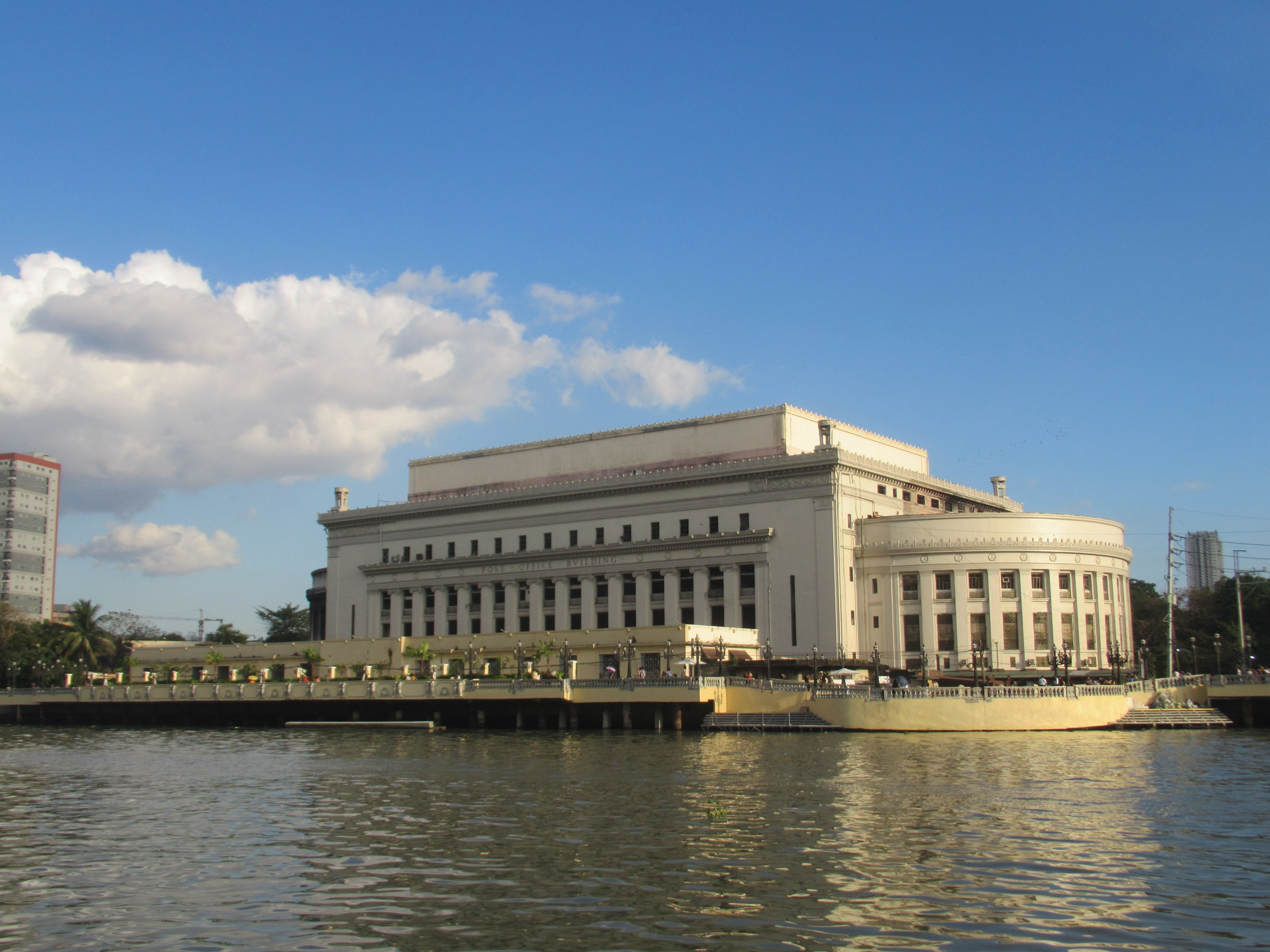
Manila Central Post Office

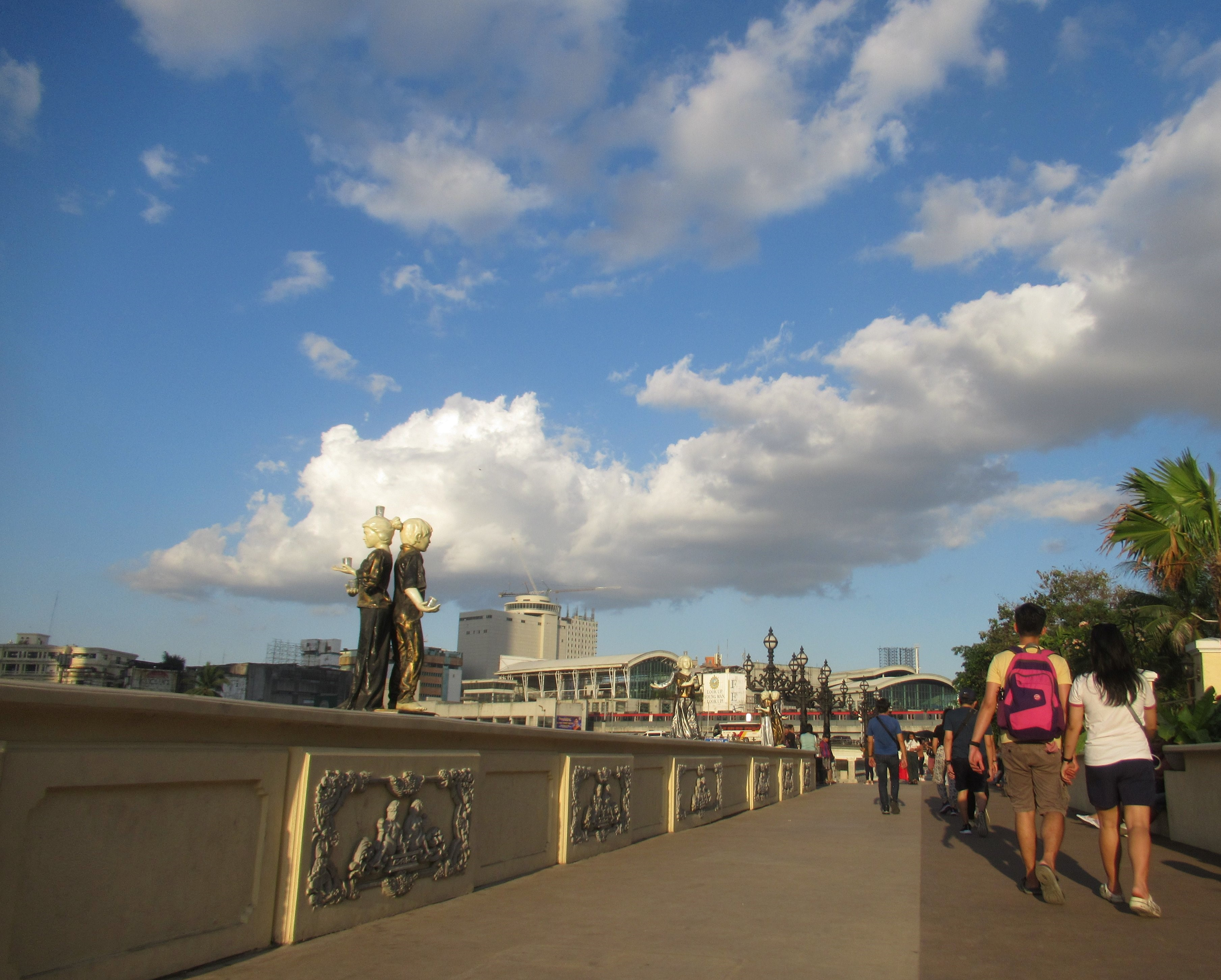
Pasig River esplanade

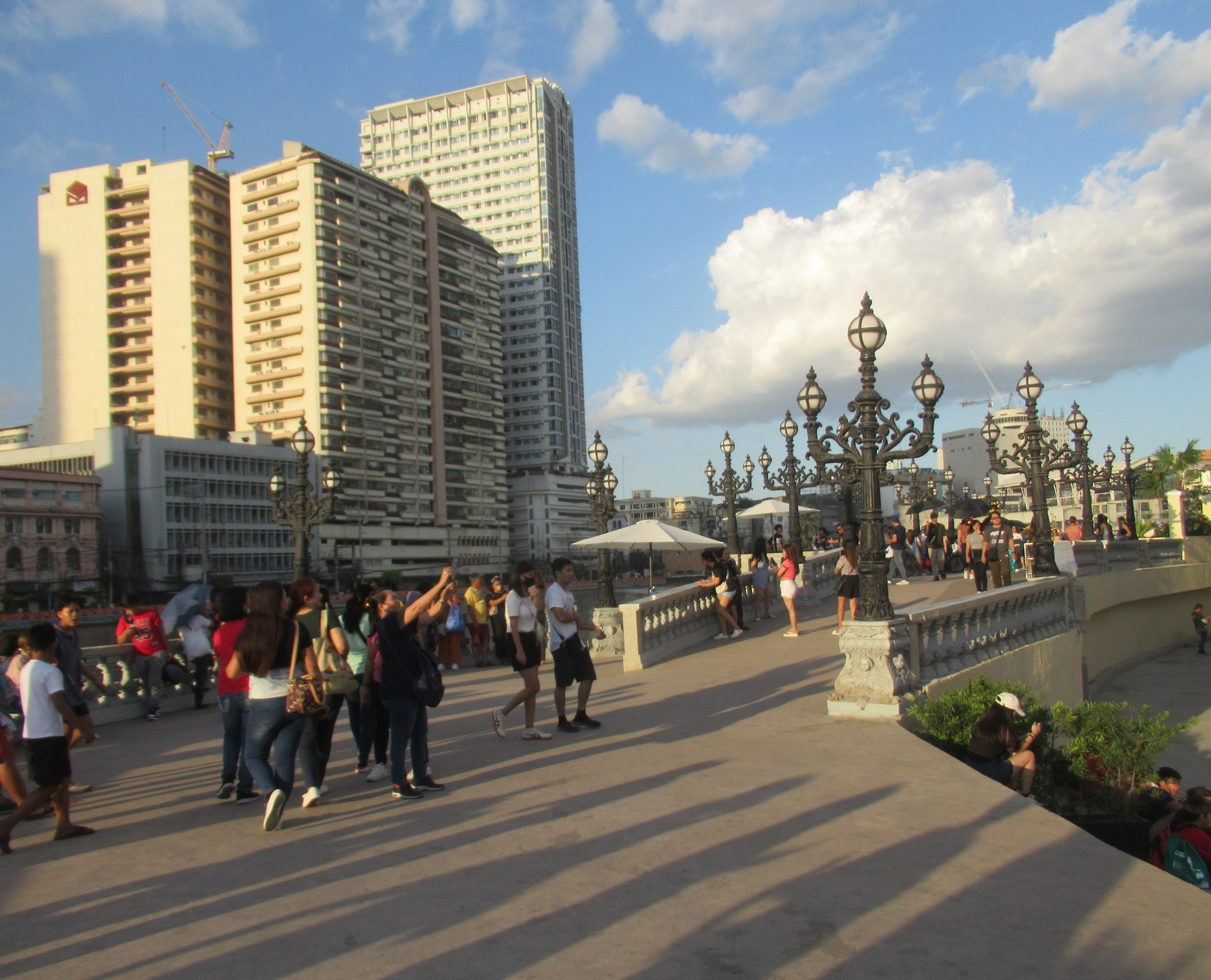
Foot of Jones Bridge

== Estero de Paco ==
During its early years, the Paco Market, which sits along the edge of the Estero de Paco, was a bustling center of commerce and culture. Local fisherman were able to take their day's catch directly from the ocean down the Pasig River to Estero de Paco, which is one of its largest tributaries. This provided the ability for many locals to gain their livelihoods from the clean waters of the Estero de Paco and Pasig River.

After WWII, when the Pasig River began to become polluted, the Estero de Paco was not able to escape the pollution. The Paco Market was neglected for years and was eventually overrun by thieves, drugs, and filth. The market vendors neglected the Estero de Paco and threw all their garbage and waste into it. As happened with the Pasig River and the rest of its tributaries, squatters moved to the sides of the Estero de Paco, further deteriorating the water quality.

Over a 10-month period, the Paco market and Estero de Paco have been revived into a cleaner, more organized market and a clean tributary flowing into the Pasig. The garbage and also silt from sewage sludge in the estero was removed by the River Warriors and through dredging. The River Warriors clean the estero with small nets and ensure that no more garbage is being placed there.

All squatters along the shores of the tributary were relocated to Laguna, Philippines. They were given affordable housing options and livelihood training for their move. The shore of the estero now have vetiver grass growing to prevent erosion. Coco Coir has been mixed with a helpful bacteria to decompose garbage left in the estero and to treat the waste water and sludge. Air is being pumped in so that the water can sustain life and fish can be placed back in the estero.

The Paco market has now been refurbished to be environmentally sustainable. A center was created inside the market to provide education to the locals about the rehabilitation efforts. The market has natural lighting and no air-conditioning to conserve energy. All vendors are charged rent to ensure that the market is able to sustain itself but not enough to cause a burden. The market sells products produced by the relocated squatters providing a source of income for those people.

== Pasig River Ferry Service ==
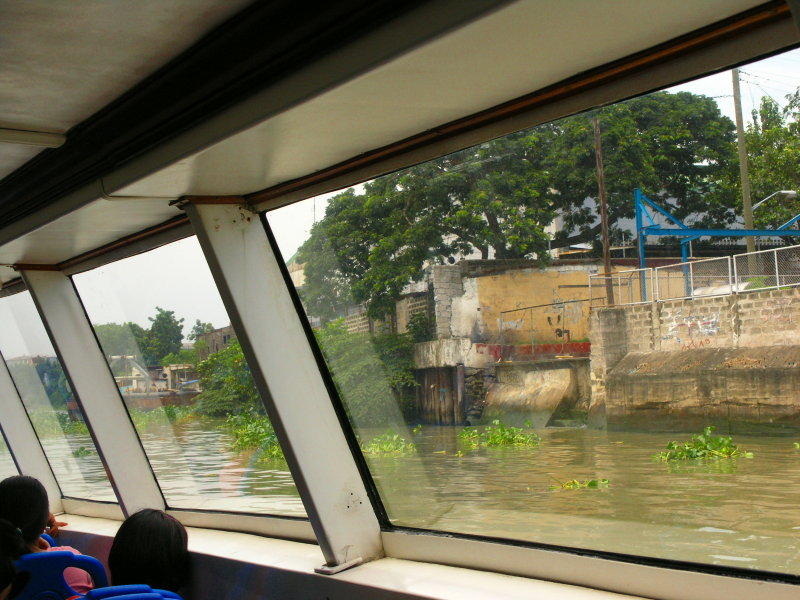
Riding inside the ferry

The Pasig River Rehabilitation Commission was placed in charge of this attempt at implementing a ferry service down the Pasig River in 2007. Before the Pasig became as polluted as it is, ferries were commonplace on the river. The last two attempts to bring in a ferry service were cut short due to too much garbage, shanty towns, and foul odors. With the river being dredged, shanty towns being relocated away from the river, and other environmentally sustainable initiatives, these are now less of a problem.

Ferry service was brought back into the Pasig River in 2007 under the management of the Pasig River Rehabilitation Commission. It was to be operated by SCC Nautical Transport Services Inc. Six boats with capacity for 150 people, air conditioning, televisions, security, and washrooms were put into service. It was the longest-lasting ferry service down the Pasig in recent years and had the longest route, with 14 stations lining the major hubs on the river. With fares ranging from P25 to P60 per trip and travel times cut in half for many, the ferry allowed many people to skip the congested streets of Manila. With less garbage, less foul odors, fewer shanty towns, and more environmental initiatives being implemented, river tours were being conducted by SCC Nautical Transport Services Inc.

It was not all smooth sailing for the latest attempt to implement a ferry service down the Pasig. The Pasig River Rehabilitation Commission oversaw all operations and built the ferry terminals, while SCC Nautical Transport Services Inc operated the ferry and four of the terminals in Quiapo, Kalawaan, Bambang, and Nagpayong. The Pasig River Rehabilitation Commission received none of the profits from these stations. Since these were the first four stations, the ferries were generally full by the time they arrived at the other terminals. The Pasig River Rehabilitation Commission only received only P5 of every ticket sold, leading them to loss P94.07 million (expenses: P101.4 million; revenue: P7.33 million).

Another problem that occurred was that SCC Nautical Transport Services Inc was supposed to implement 18 50-seat vessels and not 6 150-seat vessels. It was due to this that some of the stations could not be used because the boats were too large to navigate. With river tours being operated, many scheduled trips had to be cancelled to accommodate them, causing many frustrated passengers to stop taking the ferry and causing passenger numbers to dwindle. Before this, the numbers were high enough that all ferries were full and SCC Nautical Transport Services Inc was considering purchasing more. The ferry service ceased operations in 2011.

In 2014, the Metropolitan Manila Development Authority took over ferry operations along the Pasig River, and continues to do so to this day, operating all days except Sundays, and free of charge.

== Environmental preservation areas ==
Environmental preservation areas (EPAs) are being designated along the shores of the Pasig and all of its tributaries, stretching 10m from the shores on each side. They will have no businesses, homes, or illegal settlements. This 10m safety net will cause waste water, sewage, and garbage from illegal settlers to be kept away from the river. During emergencies, the river will provide access for maintenance and emergency crews and will provide a buffer zone during times of flooding. These areas will also allow river transportation as well as boats bringing amenities to the city, including the local markets. They will serve as tourist attractions, greenbelts, and riverside parks.

The 10m distance from the shore has come under controversy since its implementation. The official law states that the government can relocate people who are within 3 m of the shores, but the Metropolitan Manila Development Authority extended this to 10 m. This is greatly contested as they do not have authority to change a national law. Families that were past the 3 m point were still being relocated to make way for the EPA zones.
