= SkyTrain (Metro Manila) =

Proposed automated people mover in Metro Manila, Philippines

Overview
- Status: Proposed
- Owner: Philippine Government
- Locale: Makati and Taguig, Metro Manila
- Termini: TBA (Guadalupe); TBA (UpTown Bonifacio)
- Stations: 2

Service
- Type: Automated guideway transit (AGT)
- Operator: Infracorp
- Daily ridership: 60,000–100,000 (projected)

History
- Commenced: TBD
- Planned opening: TBD

Technical
- Line length: 1.87 km (1.16 mi)
- Character: Elevated

SkyTrain is a proposed automated people mover line meant to serve the city of Makati and Bonifacio Global City area in Taguig, Metro Manila. Originally scheduled for completion in 2021, as of March 2022, construction has yet to begin.

== History ==
=== Development ===
Infracorp Development Inc., a subsidiary of Alliance Global Group of Andrew Tan submitted an unsolicited proposal to build a people mover system which will link the Fort Bonifacio area in Taguig and the Guadalupe MRT station in Makati on October 26, 2017 to the Department of Transportation (DOTr). The proposal was officially endorsed by the DOTr in May 2018 and Infracorp was given "original proponent status" by the government agency.

Following the DOTr's endorsement, the proposal is subject to review by the Investment Coordination Committee of the National Economic and Development Authority Board.

After Infracorp was given "original proponent status" over the SkyTrain project, the firm began looking for an operations and maintenance partner, as well as the technology supplier. By June 2018, Infracorp has already received bids from firms based in Austria, China, France, and Japan. The company is set to make a decision regarding SkyTrain's operations and maintenance partner, and technology supplier by the end of 2018.

=== Construction ===
The construction of the SkyTrain is projected to cost ₱3.5 billion and is set to commence within the first half of 2019. Infracorp will construct the people mover line for two years and plans to make the SkyTrain operational by the end of 2021. Upon its completion, the SkyTrain's ownership will be transferred to the Philippine government but Infracorp shall be the sole operator of the people mover.

== Technology ==
The SkyTrain will use an automated cable-propelled people mover technology. While it is described in the media as a 'monorail', cable-propelled people movers are not part of that transit type. Renderings show the trains to be nearly identical to the ones used in the Leitner-Poma Minimetro system installed in Miami International Airport’s E-Train.

== Stations ==
The people mover will have two stations one in the Guadalupe area in Makati and another at the Uptown Bonifacio in Bonifacio Global City, Taguig. The whole line will be about 1.87 kilometers (1.16 mi).

== Ridership ==
The rail line is projected to have 60,000 to 100,000 daily ridership.

== Possible expansion ==
There are plans to expand the proposed rail line that will run from the Guadalupe area in Makati to Uptown Bonifacio area in Taguig. Any additional stations shall be included in a second or third phase of construction.

In February 2018, it was reported that Ayala Corporation is considering a partnership with Infracorp. Ayala reportedly plans to extend the SkyTrain to the Makati Central Business District or up to the Manila Light Rail Transit System Line 1 (LRT-1). However at that time, Ayala has not started formal talks with Infracorp or its parent company, Alliance Global Inc regarding the SkyTrain project. The expansion could benefit Ayala Corp's Circuit Makati in Makati and Arca South in Taguig.
