= Pasig River Rehabilitation Commission =

Agency overview
- Formed: January 6, 1999
- Dissolved: 2019
- Superseding agencies: Department of Environment and Natural Resources; Manila Bay Task Force
- Jurisdiction: Philippines
- Headquarters: Quezon City, Philippines
- Website: www.prrc.gov.ph

The Pasig River Rehabilitation Commission (PRRC; Filipino: Komisyon sa Rehabilitasyon ng Ilog Pasig) was a state commission in charge of the rehabilitation of the Pasig River. The commission served for 20 years, from 1999 until its dissolution by President Rodrigo Duterte in November 2019. The body's powers and functions were transferred to the Manila Bay Task Force and the Department of Environment and Natural Resources.

== History ==
The commission was created on January 6, 1999 through Executive Order No. 54 to strengthen the government's program to rehabilitate the river for transportation, recreation and tourism purposes. Its powers and functions, according to the executive order, were to:

- Draw up an updated and integrated Master Plan on the Rehabilitation of the Pasig River;
- Ensure that the easements provided for in the Civil Code and other related laws are observed including all the esteros and waterways that drain into the Pasig River;
- Integrate and coordinate all programs related to the rehabilitation of the Pasig River;
- Abate the dumping of untreated industrial wastewater and sewerage into the river including all acts and omission in violation of the Pollution Control Law and other related laws;
- Relocate settlers, squatters and other unauthorized or unlawful occupants along its banks;
- Undertake civil works for the purpose, such as dredging, clearing of structures, cleaning of the River and all the esteros and waterways that drain into it;
- Submit regular reports to the Office of the President on the status of the government's efforts on the rehabilitation and development of the Pasig River; and to
- Coordinate with all government agencies and offices, including local government units.

Executive Order No. 54 also abolished the Pasig River Development Council, the Presidential Task Force on Pasig River Rehabilitation and the River Rehabilitation Secretariat, whose functions were transferred to the commission.

On January 19, thirteen days after Executive Order No. 54 was signed, an amendment was inserted giving private companies a license to coordinate with the commission concerning the rehabilitation program.

In March 2008, ABS-CBN Foundation Inc. and the Department of Environment and Natural Resources through the Pasig River Rehabilitation Commission signed a memorandum of agreement to co-manage the rehabilitation of the Pasig River and its tributaries.

In October 2019, President Rodrigo Duterte called on Congress to abolish the commission. This was after he transferred the chairmanship of the agency from the Department of Budget and Management to the Department of Environment and Natural Resources and fired its executive director allegedly due to graft and corruption. The commission, earlier in May, was cited by the Commission on Audit for having low accomplishment rates in 2018 despite using up 96% of its budget.

In November 8, 2019, through Executive Order No. 93, Duterte abolished the commission and transferred its powers and functions to the Manila Bay Task Force, the Department of Environment and Natural Resources, the Department of Human Settlements and Urban Development, the Metropolitan Manila Development Authority and the Department of Public Works and Highways.

On July 25, 2023, President Ferdinand R. Marcos Jr. issued Executive Order No. 35 creating the Inter-Agency Council for the Pasig River Urban Development (IAC-PRUD). On August 13, 2025, President Marcos Jr. has issued Executive Order 92, creating the Office of the Presidential Adviser on Pasig River Rehabilitation (OPAPRR) and is headed by the Presidential Adviser for Pasig River Rehabilitation (PAPRR) with the rank of a Secretary. The Presidential Adviser serves as the chair of the IAC-PRUD, the Metro Manila Development Authority Chair serves as Vice-Chair while members include the Secretaries of the Department of Human Settlements and Urban Development (DHSUD), Department of Public Works and Highways (DPWH), Department of Environment and Natural Resources (DENR), Department of the Interior and Local Government (DILG), Department of Labor and Employment, Department of Tourism (DOT), Department of Transportation (DOTr), Department of Finance (DOF), and the Department of Budget and Management (DBM). Jerry Acuzar was appointed as Presidential Adviser for Pasig River Rehabilitation.

== Structure ==
The commission had its headquarters in Quezon City. It was headed by the Secretary of Budget and Management as its chairperson until 2019 when it was transferred to the Secretary of Environment and Natural Resources. The chairman of the Metropolitan Manila Development Authority served as co-chairman. The commission was composed of the:

- Executive Secretary
- Secretary of Public Works and Highways
- Secretary of Budget and Management (before 2019 it was the environment secretary)
- Secretary of Tourism
- Secretary of Transportation
- Secretary of Finance
- Secretary of Trade and Industry
- Secretary of National Defense
- Secretary of the Interior and Local Government
- Secretary of Human Settlements and Urban Development (before 2019 it was the chairperson of the Housing and Urban Development Coordinating Council)
- Three representatives from the private sector appointed by the president

The day-to-day operations of the commission was handled by the executive director who in turn was assisted by two deputy executive directors. The executive director was also the head of the Project Management Office.

== See also ==
- Rehabilitation of the Pasig River
- Laguna Lake Development Authority
