= List of roads in Metro Manila =

Metro Manila's major road network
- Simplified map of radial (solid and colored lines) and circumferential (dashed and gray lines) roads in Metro Manila

System information
- Maintained by the Department of Public Works and Highways (DPWH) and the Metropolitan Manila Development Authority (MMDA)
- Formed: 1945

Highway names
- Radial road: Rx, Rxx
- Circumferential road: Cx

System links
- Roads in the Philippines; Highways; Expressways; List

This list of roads in Metro Manila summarizes the major thoroughfares and the numbering system currently being implemented in Metro Manila, Philippines.

Metro Manila's major road network comprises six circumferential roads and ten radial roads connecting the cities of Caloocan, Las Piñas, Makati, Malabon, Mandaluyong, Manila, Marikina, Muntinlupa, Navotas, Parañaque, Pasay, Pasig, Quezon City, San Juan, Taguig, and Valenzuela, and the municipality of Pateros.

== Route classification ==
This list only covers roads that are listed on the Department of Public Works and Highways's Infrastructure Atlas, as well as the previous circumferential and radial road system prior to 2014, and other notable roads in the metro. These road classifications are defined as follows:

- National Primary Roads – Contiguous road sections extending that connect major cities. Primary roads make up the main trunk line or backbone of the national road system.
- National secondary roads – Roads that directly connect major ports, major ferry terminals, major airports, tourist service centers, and major government infrastructure to national primary roads.

Both primary and secondary roads may be designated as bypass or diversion roads, which divert through traffic away from city or municipal business centers with affirmative feasibility studies, or roads that would connect or fill the gap between adjoining national roads.

- National tertiary roads – Other existing roads under the Department of Public Works and Highways that perform a local function.

Any roads not classified as national primary, national secondary, or national tertiary may be classified as follows:

- Expressways – Controlled-access highways or limited-access roads, normally with interchanges that may include facilities for levying tolls for passage in an open or closed system.
- Provincial roads – Roads that connect barangays through rural areas, major provincial government infrastructure, and/or cities and municipalities without traversing any national roads.
- Municipal and city roads – Roads within a poblacion or roads that connect provincial and national roads or provide inter-barangay connections to major municipal and city infrastructure without traversing provincial roads
- Barangay roads – Any other public roads within a barangay not covered by other classifications.

Additional classifications are unclassified roads, road not yet given official classification, and private roads, roads that are maintained by private entities and may have access restrictions.

== Numbered routes ==
=== Circumferential and radial roads ===
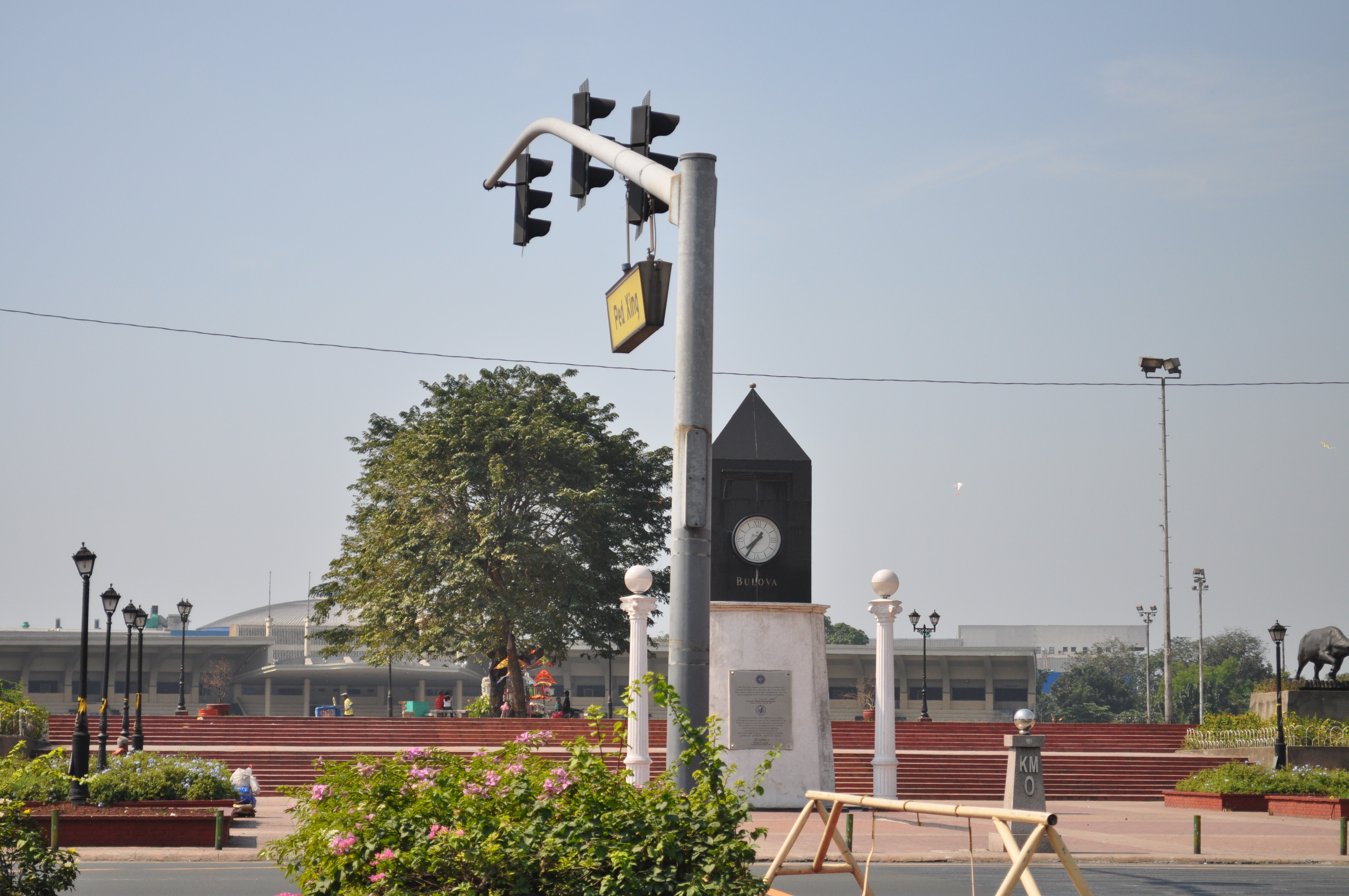
Next to the Jose Rizal Memorial Monument in Rizal Park is the kilometer zero of all the roads in Luzon and the rest of the Philippines.

The first road numbering system in the Philippines was adapted in 1940 by the administration of President Manuel Quezon, and was very much similar to U.S. Highway numbering system. Portions of it are 70 roads labeled Highway 1 to Highway 60. Some parts of the numbering system are Admiral Dewey Boulevard (Highway 1), Calle Manila (Highway 50) and 19 de Junio (Highway 54).

In 1945, the Metropolitan Thoroughfare Plan was submitted by Quezon City planners Louis Croft and Antonio Kayanan which proposed the laying of 10 radial roads, which purposes in conveying traffic in and out of the city of Manila to the surrounding cities and provinces, and the completion of six Circumferential Roads, that will act as beltways of the city, forming altogether a web-like arterial road system. The Department of Public Works and Highways (DPWH) is the government agency that deals with these projects.

The road numbering for radial roads are R-1 up to R-10. The radial roads never intersect one another and they do not intersect circumferential roads twice; hence they continue straight routes leading out from the city of Manila to the provinces. The numbering is arranged in a counter-clockwise pattern, wherein the southernmost is R-1 and the northernmost is R-10. Circumferential roads are numbered C-1 to C-6, the innermost beltway is C-1, while the outermost is C-6.

==== Radial roads ====
There are ten radial roads that serves the purpose of conveying traffic in and out of the city of Manila to the surrounding cities of the metropolis and to the provinces, numbered in a counter clockwise pattern. All radial roads starts at Kilometer Zero, demarked by a marble marker across from the Rizal Monument in Rizal Park along Roxas Boulevard.

Radial roads of Metro Manila
Name	Image	Route	Major cities	Component highways	Length	Ref.
R-1 Radial Road 1	Roxas Boulevard in Manila	Manila–Parañaque	List (3): Manila; Parañaque; Pasay	Bonifacio Drive; Roxas Boulevard	5.34 km (3.32 mi)	
Radial Road 1 connects the City of Manila to the province of Cavite, officially starting at Bonifacio Drive after Anda Circle. The road skirts the coastline of Manila Bay entering Roxas Boulevard and reaching its southern terminus after crossing NAIA Road, as the Manila–Cavite Expressway (E3). 8.8 kilometers (5.5 mi) from Rizal Park to Parañaque.
R-2 Radial Road 2	Taft Avenue in Manila	Manila–Parañaque	List (3): Manila; Parañaque; Pasay	Taft Avenue	7 km (4.3 mi)	
The road lies parallel to Radial Road 1, connecting the City of Manila to Cavite and Batangas. The road starts from the Lagusnilad Underpass in front of the National Museum in Ermita. The road, as Taft Avenue, will follow a straight route, and ends at the junction with Redemptorist Road, Harrison Street, and Elpidio Quirino Avenue.
R-3 Radial Road 3		Manila–Muntinlupa	List (6): Makati; Manila; Muntinlupa; Parañaque; Pasay; Taguig	Osmeña Highway; South Luzon Expressway	27.19 km (16.90 mi)	
The entire road is an expressway, except for its northern end starting from its junction with Sales Interchange. It is jointly operated by the Skyway Operation and Management Corporation (SomCo) and the Citra Metro Manila Tollways Corporation (CMMTC). Although the kilometer zero of the road is at Rizal Park, the road officially starts from the junction of South Luzon Expressway and Quirino Avenue. The road follows a straight route starting from Paco, Manila and R-3 ends at the Muntinlupa-San Pedro boundary.
R-4 Radial Road 4	Kalayaan Avenue in Makati, near Fort Bonifacio	Manila–Taguig	List (3): Makati; Manila; Taguig	Tejeron Street; Jose P. Rizal Avenue	5.51 km (3.42 mi)	
The road starts from the junction of Pedro Gil Street in Santa Ana, Manila, and it enters Makati after passing Tejeron Street before ending in Pateros bridge in Pateros–Taguig boundary.
R-5 Radial Road 5	Shaw Boulevard in Mandaluyong	Pasig–Quezon City	List (2): Pasig; Quezon City	Ortigas Avenue	5.61 km (3.49 mi)	
Radial Road 5 starts at the intersection of EDSA and follows the alignment of Ortigas Avenue, passing the Ortigas Central Business District, and then ends at the Pasig–Cainta boundary.
R-6 Radial Road 6	Aurora Boulevard Marikina–Infanta Highway in Marikina	Manila–Marikina	List (4): Manila; Marikina; Quezon City; San Juan	Legarda Street; Magsaysay Boulevard; Aurora Boulevard; Marikina–Infanta Highway	13.94 km (8.66 mi)	
Radial Road 6 starts from the junction of Mendiola Street, Recto Avenue, and Legarda Street. The road will serve as a major thoroughfare in Santa Mesa, Manila, and enters Quezon City before crossing G. Araneta Avenue to become Aurora Boulevard. The boulevard then enters the city of San Juan and the districts of New Manila and Cubao in Quezon City and serves as the main thoroughfare in Araneta Center. The road becomes Marikina–Infanta Highway (Marcos Highway) after crossing Katipunan Avenue. The highway then passes through the cities of Marikina then in Pasig. R-6 ends at the Marikina–Cainta boundary.
R-7 Radial Road 7	España Boulevard Commonwealth Avenue	Manila–Quezon City	List (2): Manila; Quezon City	Lerma Street; España Boulevard; Quezon Avenue; Elliptical Road; Commonwealth Avenue	18.09 km (11.24 mi)	
Radial Road 7 starts from Sampaloc, Manila. The road follows a direct route towards Quezon City. After crossing the Quezon City Memorial Circle, it becomes Commonwealth Avenue, the widest road in the Philippines. It ends at an intersection with Quirino Highway.
R-8 Radial Road 8	Dimasalang Street	Manila–Quezon City	List (3): Caloocan; Manila; Quezon City	Quezon Boulevard; Andalucia Street; Dimasalang Street; Andres Bonifacio Avenue; Quirino Highway	39.96 km (24.83 mi)	
Radial Road 8 starts from Quezon Bridge in Quiapo, Manila. The road will follow a direct route northwards, becoming the North Luzon Expressway after crossing EDSA. The road turns in Quirino Highway and ends in Quezon City-north Caloocan boundary
R-9 Radial Road 9	Rizal Avenue	Manila–Valenzuela	List (4): Caloocan; Manila; Malabon; Valenzuela	Rizal Avenue; MacArthur Highway	15.08 km (9.37 mi)	
The Radial Road 9 consists of the northern portion of the Pan-Philippine Highway or AH-26.(R-2 takes the southern portion) The LRT Line 1 follows the route of R-9 from Manila to Monumento, Caloocan. R-9 starts as the Rizal Bridge from Padre Burgos Avenue. It follows a straight northward route parallel to R-8. The road becomes MacArthur Highway after crossing the Monumento Roundabout in Caloocan. The road officially ends at Valenzuela–Meycauayan boundary.
R-10 Radial Road 10	Anda Circle	Manila–Navotas	List (2): Manila; Navotas	Radial Road 10; Mel Lopez Boulevard	6.2 km (3.9 mi)	
The Radial Road 10 is currently a 6.2-kilometer-long (3.9 mi) highway from Anda Circle in Manila to C-4 Road in Navotas.

==== Circumferential roads ====
There are six circumferential roads around the City of Manila that acts as beltways for the city. The first two runs inside the City of Manila, while the next three runs outside the City of Manila. All are beltways around Intramuros.

Circumferential roads of Metro Manila
Name	Image	Route	Major cities	Component highways	Length	Ref.
C-1 Circumferential Road 1	Padre Burgos Avenue Recto Avenue	Manila	List (1): Manila	Recto Avenue; Legarda Street; Nepomuceno Street; P. Casal Street; Ayala Boulevard; Finance Drive; Padre Burgos Avenue	5.98 km (3.72 mi)	
Circumferential Road 1 or C-1 is a route that runs inside the Manila city proper, passing through the city districts of Tondo, San Nicolas, Binondo, Santa Cruz, Quiapo, Sampaloc, San Miguel, and Ermita. It starts from the North Port as Recto Avenue and becomes Legarda Street after crossing R-6. It then becomes Nepomuceno and P. Casal Streets in Quiapo. The road then crosses the Pasig River as Ayala Boulevard, which ends in Taft Avenue and enters Rizal Park as Finance Drive, which merges into the southern part of Padre Burgos Avenue, which ends in a junction with Roxas Boulevard.
C-2 Circumferential Road 2	Quirino Avenue	Manila	List (1): Manila	Capulong Street; Tayuman Street; Lacson Avenue; Nagtahan Street; Quirino Avenue	10.18 km (6.33 mi)	
The C-2 Road starts from Tondo, Manila, passing through the Manila city districts of Santa Cruz, Sampaloc, Santa Mesa, Pandacan, Paco, and Malate. It starts from R-10 (Mel Lopez Boulevard) as Capulong Street, becomes Tayuman Street past Juan Luna Street, then continues on as Arsenio H. Lacson Avenue in Santa Cruz district and becomes Nagtahan Street past Nagtahan Interchange. It then crosses the Pasig River, then becomes President Quirino Avenue, which continues on until it reaches R-1 (Roxas Boulevard), passing through the Paco and Malate districts.
C-3 Circumferential Road 3	5th Avenue	Navotas–San Juan	List (4): Caloocan; Navotas; Quezon City; San Juan	C-3 Road; 5th Avenue; Sergeant Rivera Avenue; Gregorio Araneta Avenue	10.72 km (6.66 mi)	
The C-3 Road is a route that lies outside the City of Manila. It starts from Mel Lopez Boulevard as the C-3 Road in Navotas, and becomes 5th Avenue after entering Caloocan. It becomes Sgt. Rivera Avenue after crossing A. Bonifacio Avenue, and becomes G. Araneta Avenue after crossing Sto. Domingo Avenue in Quezon City. The road ends after entering San Juan at N. Domingo Street.
C-4 Circumferential Road 4	Estrella Flyover	Navotas–Pasay	List (8): Caloocan; Makati; Malabon; Mandaluyong; Navotas; Pasay; Quezon City; San Juan	C-4 Road; Samson Road; Epifanio de los Santos Avenue	27.35 km (16.99 mi)	
The C-4 Road starts from Navotas. It becomes Paterio Aquino Avenue, then becomes Gen. San Miguel Street and then Samson Road after entering Caloocan. After crossing the Monumento Roundabout, C-4 becomes EDSA, a major thoroughfare in the metropolis. With 2.34 million vehicles and almost 314,354 cars passing through it and its segments every day, the road is also the busiest highway and most congested in the metropolis. C-4 ends at the intersection of Roxas Boulevard in Pasay.
C-5 Circumferential Road 5	C-5 Road (as Katipunan Avenue)	Valenzuela–Las Piñas	List (8): Las Piñas; Makati; Parañaque; Pasay; Pasig; Quezon City; Taguig; Valenzuela	NLEX Harbor Link; Mindanao Avenue; Congressional Avenue; Luzon Avenue; Tandang Sora Avenue; Katipunan Avenue; Bonny Serrano Avenue; Eulogio Rodriguez Jr. Avenue; Carlos P. Garcia Avenue; C-5 Road Extension	43.87 km (27.26 mi)	
The road starts at the Karuhatan Exit of the North Luzon Expressway (NLEX) Harbor Link segment that crosses the NLEX mainline and becomes Mindanao Avenue. The road will then follow the route of Congressional Avenue and Luzon Avenue, crossing Commonwealth Avenue and becoming Tandang Sora Avenue, which becomes Katipunan Avenue after crossing Magsaysay Avenue in the University of the Philippines Diliman campus. The road will then follow the route of Col. Bonny Serrano Avenue and become Eulogio Rodriguez Jr. Avenue until Pasig and Carlos P. Garcia Avenue upon entering Taguig. The road ends in the East Service Road in Taguig, parallel to the South Luzon Expressway (SLEX). Its southern extension across SLEX starts from the West Service Road in Pasay to Coastal Road in Las Piñas.
C-6 Circumferential Road 6	C-6 Road in Taguig at night	Taguig–Pasig	List (3): Pasig; Taguig; Taytay	Highway 2000 (Phase 1); Laguna Lake Highway; General Santos Avenue	50.8 km (31.6 mi)	
Currently operational in San Jose del Monte, Bulacan, San Mateo, Rizal, and from Taytay, Rizal to Taguig. It is planned to be extended north up to Marilao, Bulacan and south up to Noveleta, Cavite. The Southeast Metro Manila Expressway, a superhighway currently under construction, would be considered part of C-6. It will act as a beltway of Metro Manila, so that buses and other transportation vehicles coming from the southern provinces going to the northern provinces would not need to pass through Metro Manila, thus lessening traffic in the metropolis.

=== Highway network ===
The radial and circumferential road numbers are being supplanted by a new highway number system, which the Department of Public Works and Highways have laid out in 2014. The new system classifies the national roads or highways as national primary roads, national secondary roads, and national tertiary roads. Primary national roads are numbered with one to two-digit numbers. Secondary national roads are assigned three-digit numbers, with the first digit being the number of the principal national road of the region. Secondary national roads around Manila mostly connect to N1 and are numbered with 100-series numbers.

=== Expressway network ===
Expressways are assigned with numbers with an E prefix to avoid confusion with numbered national roads. The network consists of controlled-access highways and limited-access roads, with crossing traffic limited to overpasses, underpasses, and interchanges. Some existing expressways serving Metro Manila also form part of the latter's arterial road network (see the list above).

Expressway routes that runs through Metro Manila
Expressway route	Image	Route	Component tollways	Length	Notes
Expressway 1		Quezon City–Rosario (La Union)	North Luzon Expressway; Subic–Clark–Tarlac Expressway; Tarlac–Pangasinan–La Union Expressway	226 km (140 mi)	Part of R-8
Expressway 2		Makati–Batangas City	Skyway; South Luzon Expressway; Southern Tagalog Arterial Road	123 km (76 mi)	Part of R-3
Expressway 2		Muntinlupa	Muntinlupa–Cavite Expressway	14 km (8.7 mi)	Spur of E2
Expressway 3		Parañaque–Kawit	Manila–Cavite Expressway	14 km (8.7 mi)	Part of R-1
Expressway 5		Quezon City–Navotas	NLEX Harbor Link	21.7 km (13.5 mi)	NLEX Mindanao Avenue Link and NLEX Karuhatan Link are part of C-5.
Expressway 6		Parañaque–Pasay	NAIA Expressway	11.6 km (7.2 mi)	Serves Ninoy Aquino International Airport

== Other major roads ==
Many other streets in the metropolis are considered major roads. Only Dr. Arcadio Santos Avenue (Sucat Road or N63) is designated a primary national road that is not part of the arterial road system. Roads with 3-number designations are secondary national roads.

This list only covers roads that are listed as National Primary, National Secondary, or National Tertiary Roads on the Department of Public Works and Highways's Infrastructure Atlas or are considered as notable roads for the specific city or municipality.

=== Capital District ===
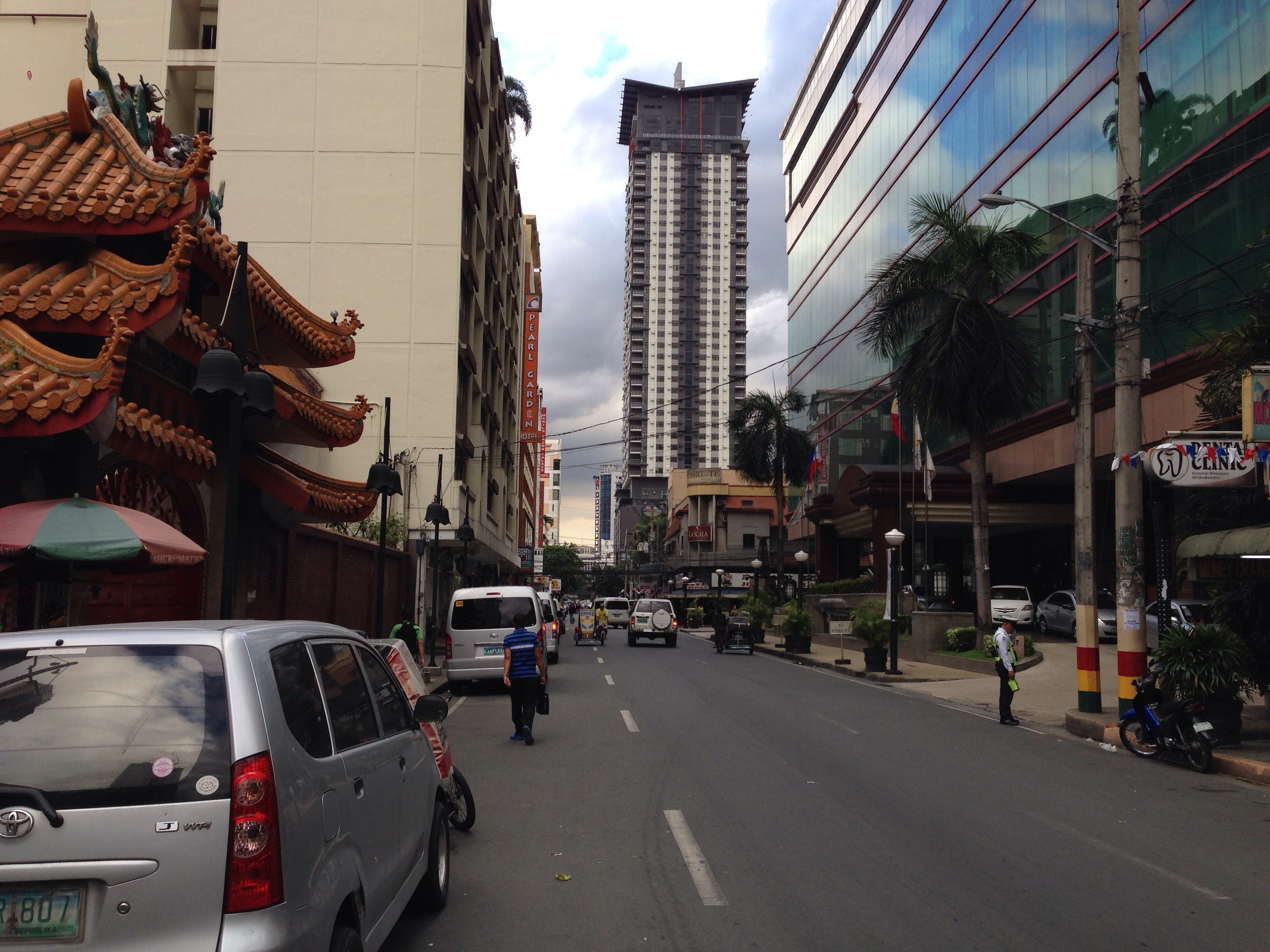
Adriatico Street

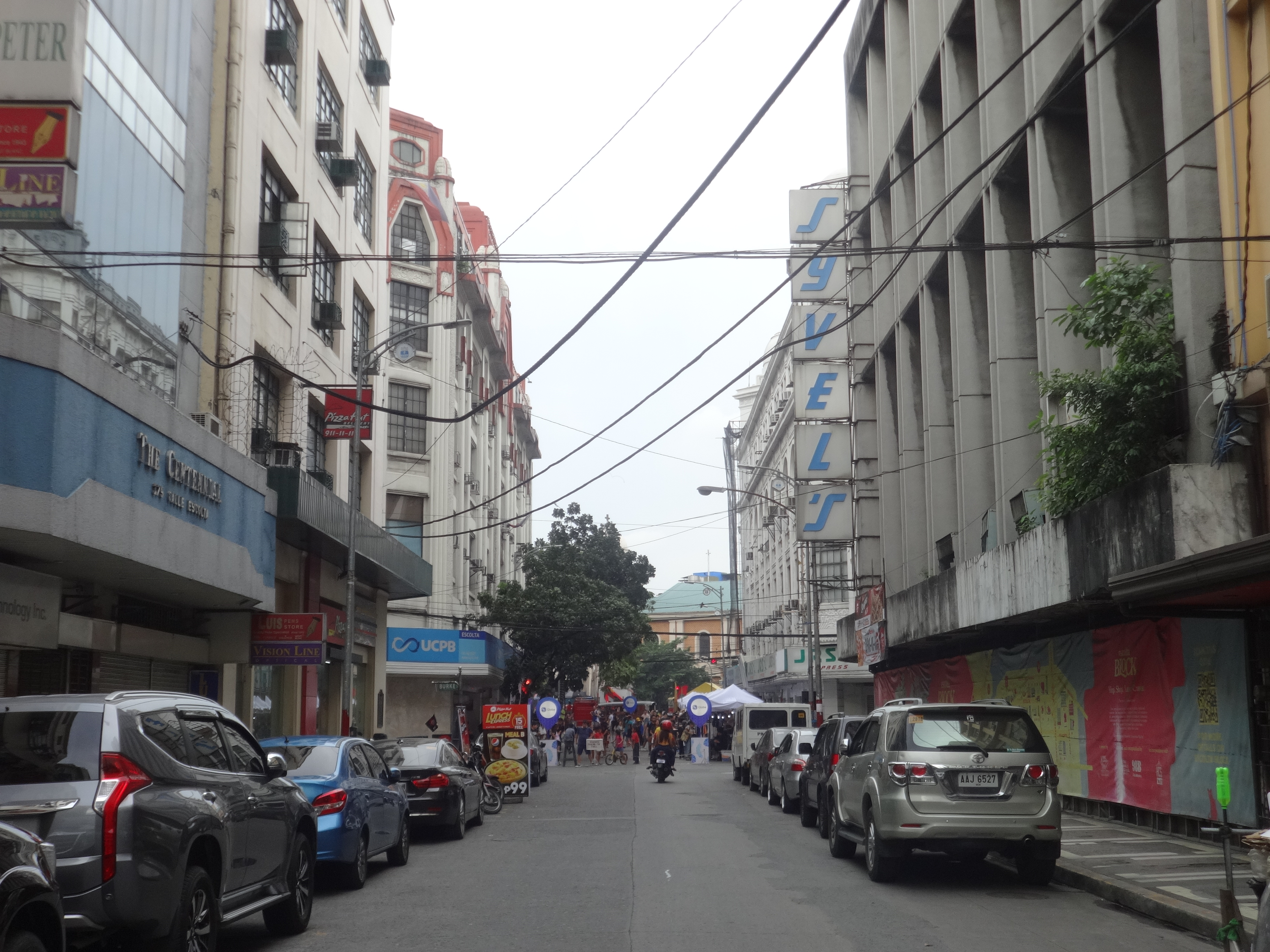
Escolta Street

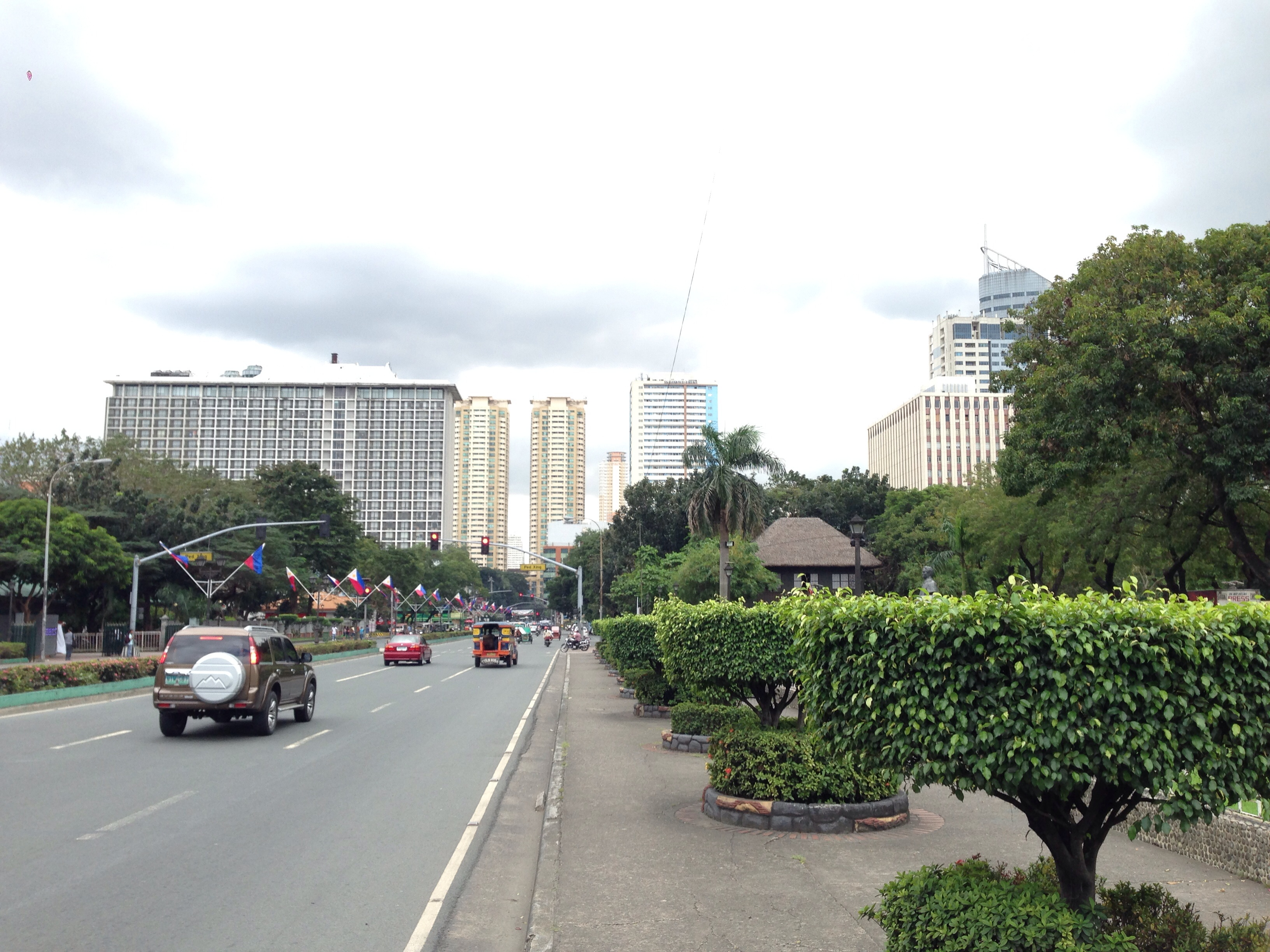
Maria Orosa Avenue

Roads in Manila (46)
Route	Name	Type	Traffic direction	# of lanes	Districts	Notes
N151	Abad Santos Avenue	Secondary	two-way	6–8	Tondo	Road continues south as R. Regente Street
	Adriatico Street	Tertiary	one-way, two-way	6	Ermita and Malate	
C-1; N180	Ayala Boulevard	Secondary	two-way	4	Ermita	
N160; N161	Blumentritt Road	Secondary	two-way	2–4	Santa Cruz and Sampaloc	
R-1; N120	Bonifacio Drive	Secondary	two-way	8	Port Area, Intramuros, and Ermita	
	Carlos Palanca Street	Tertiary	one-way, two-way	4	Quiapo and San Miguel	
	Del Pilar Street	Tertiary	one-way	2	Ermita and Malate	
R-8; N162	Dimasalang Street	Secondary	two-way	4–6	Santa Cruz and Sampaloc	
R-7; N170	España Boulevard	Secondary	two-way	8	Sampaloc	
	Escolta Street	Tertiary	one-way	2	Binondo	
C-1; N180	Finance Road	Tertiary	two-way	6	Ermita	
	Hidalgo Street	Tertiary	two-way	4	Quiapo	
	Jose Laurel Street	Tertiary	two-way	4	San Miguel	Road continues west as C. Palanca Street
	Juan Luna Street	Tertiary	one-way, two-way	4-6	Binondo and Tondo	
N155	Kalaw Avenue	Secondary	two-way	6	Ermita	
C-2; N140	Lacson Avenue	Secondary	two-way	4–8	Santa Cruz and Sampaloc	
C-1; N180	Legarda Street	Secondary	two-way	4–8	Quiapo and Sampaloc	
R-7; N170	Lerma Street	Secondary	two-way	8	Sampaloc	
R-6; N180	Magsaysay Boulevard	Secondary	two-way	8	Sampaloc and Santa Mesa	
	Maria Orosa Street	Tertiary	one-way, two-way	2	Ermita and Malate	
	Mendiola Street	Tertiary	two-way	4–6	San Miguel	
	Nicanor Reyes Street	Tertiary	two-way	4	Sampaloc	Formerly known as Morayta Street
	Ocampo Street	Tertiary	one-way, two-way	2–4	Malate and San Andres Bukid	Formerly and still referred to as Vito Cruz Street
R-3 N145	Osmeña Highway	Secondary	two-way	10	Paco, Malate, and San Andres	Road starts at Quirino Avenue
C-1; N150; N170	Padre Burgos Avenue	Secondary	two-way	8	Ermita	Road continues west as Katigbak Parkway, ends at Jones Bridge
	Padre Faura Street	Tertiary	one-way	3	Ermita and Paco	
C-1; N180	Pascual Casal Street	Secondary	two-way	4	San Miguel and Quiapo	
N141	Paula Sanchez Street	Secondary	two-way	2–4	Santa Mesa	
R-4	Pedro Gil Street	Tertiary	one-way, two-way	2	Ermita, Malate, Paco, and Santa Ana	
R-7; N170	Quezon Boulevard	Secondary	two-way	6–10	Ermita, Quiapo, and Sampaloc	Road continues north as A. Mendoza Street, continues south as Padre Burgos Avenue
	Quintin Paredes Road	Tertiary	one-way	4	Binondo	
C-2; N140; N156	Quirino Avenue	Secondary	two-way	4–6	Malate, Paco and Pandacan	Includes the extension as N156 running from Quirino Avenue to UN Avenue
C-1; N145	Recto Avenue	Secondary	two-way	4–6	Tondo, Binondo, Santa Cruz, and Sampaloc	
R-9; N150	Rizal Avenue	Secondary	two-way	2–6	Santa Cruz and Tondo	
N150	Ronquillo Street	Secondary	one-way	2	Santa Cruz	
R-1; N120	Roxas Boulevard	Primary	two-way	8	Ermita and Malate	Road continues north as Bonifacio Drive
	San Andres Street	Tertiary	one-way, two-way	4	Malate and San Andres Bukid	
N181	San Marcelino Street	Tertiary	one-way	4	Malate, Paco, and Ermita	Road starts at Natividad Lopez Street and ends at San Andres Street
R-2; N170	Taft Avenue	Secondary	two-way	4–8	Ermita and Malate	Road continues north as Padre Burgos Avenue
C-2; N140	Tayuman Street	Secondary	two-way	4	Tondo and Santa Cruz	Road starts at Juan Luna Street and ends at Lacson Street
	Tejeron Street	Tertiary	two-way	4	Santa Ana	
R-5 N141	Tomas Claudio Street	Secondary	one-way, two way	2–4	Paco, Pandacan, Santa Mesa	Road starts from Quirino Avenue. Part of the Nagtahan Link Bridge
N156	United Nations Avenue	Secondary	two-way	4–6	Ermita and Paco	Road starts at Roxas Boulevard and continues as Paz Mendoza Guazon Street
N141	Valenzuela Street	Secondary	one-way	2–3	Santa Mesa	Road starts at Magsaysay Boulevard and continues as P. Sanchez Street
R-5; N183	Victorino Mapa Street	Secondary	one-way, two-way	4–6	Santa Mesa	Road starts at Magsaysay Boulevard and continues as P. Sanchez Street
	Zobel Roxas Street	Tertiary	one-way, two-way	2–4	Malate, San Andres Bukid, and Santa Ana	Road starts at F. Muñoz Street and continues as R. Delpan Street

=== Eastern Manila District ===
==== Mandaluyong ====
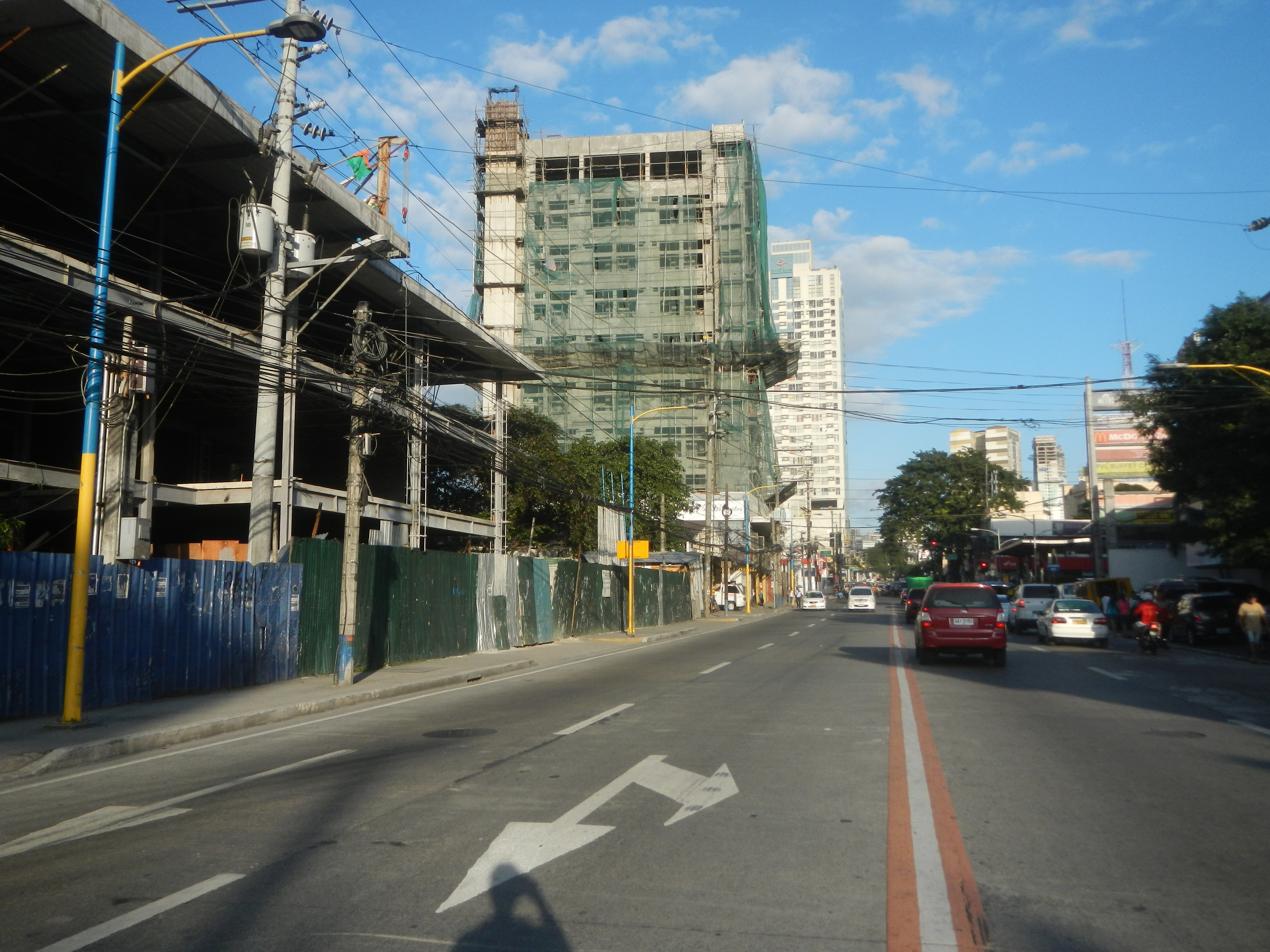
Shaw Boulevard

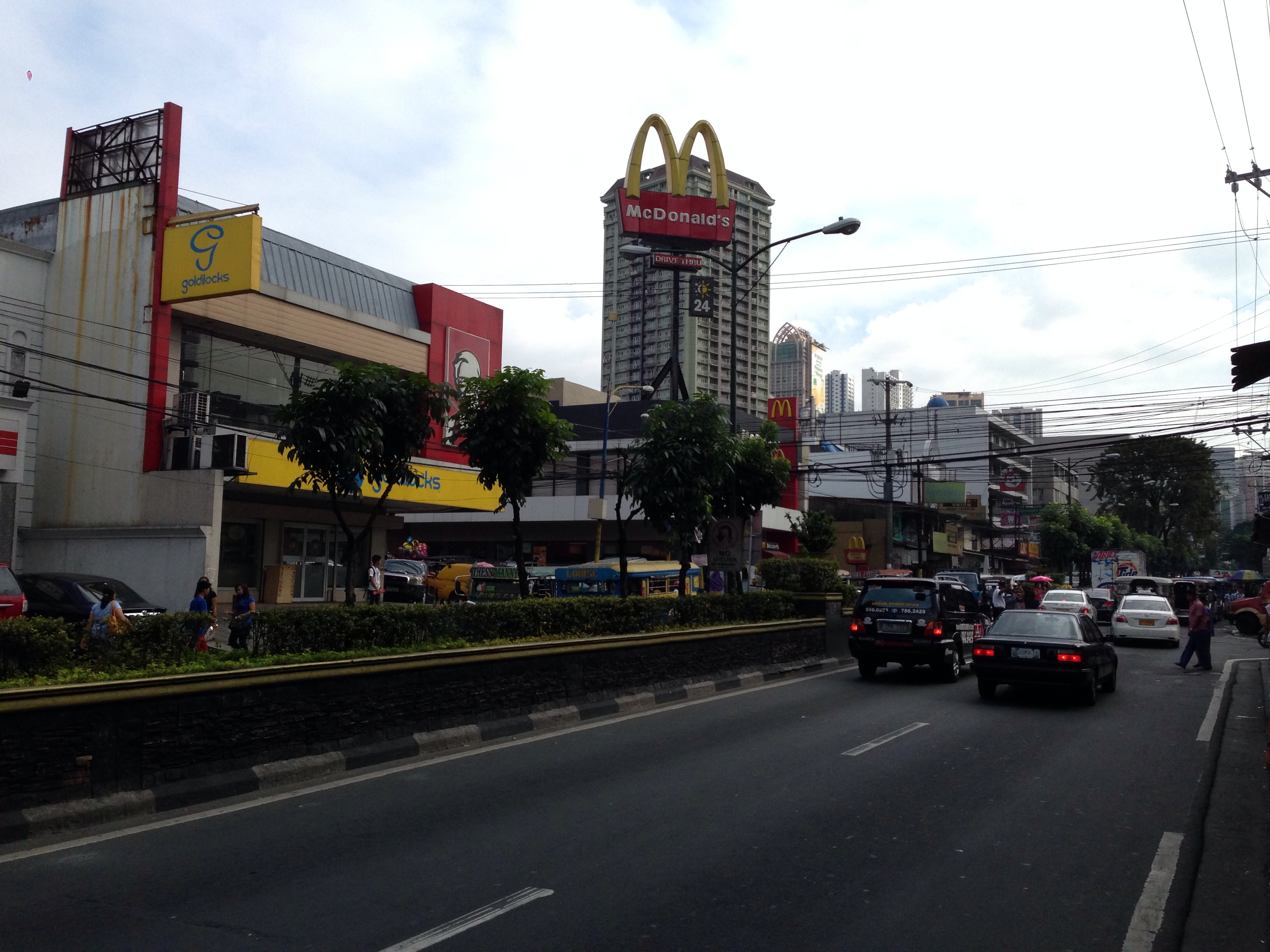
Boni Avenue

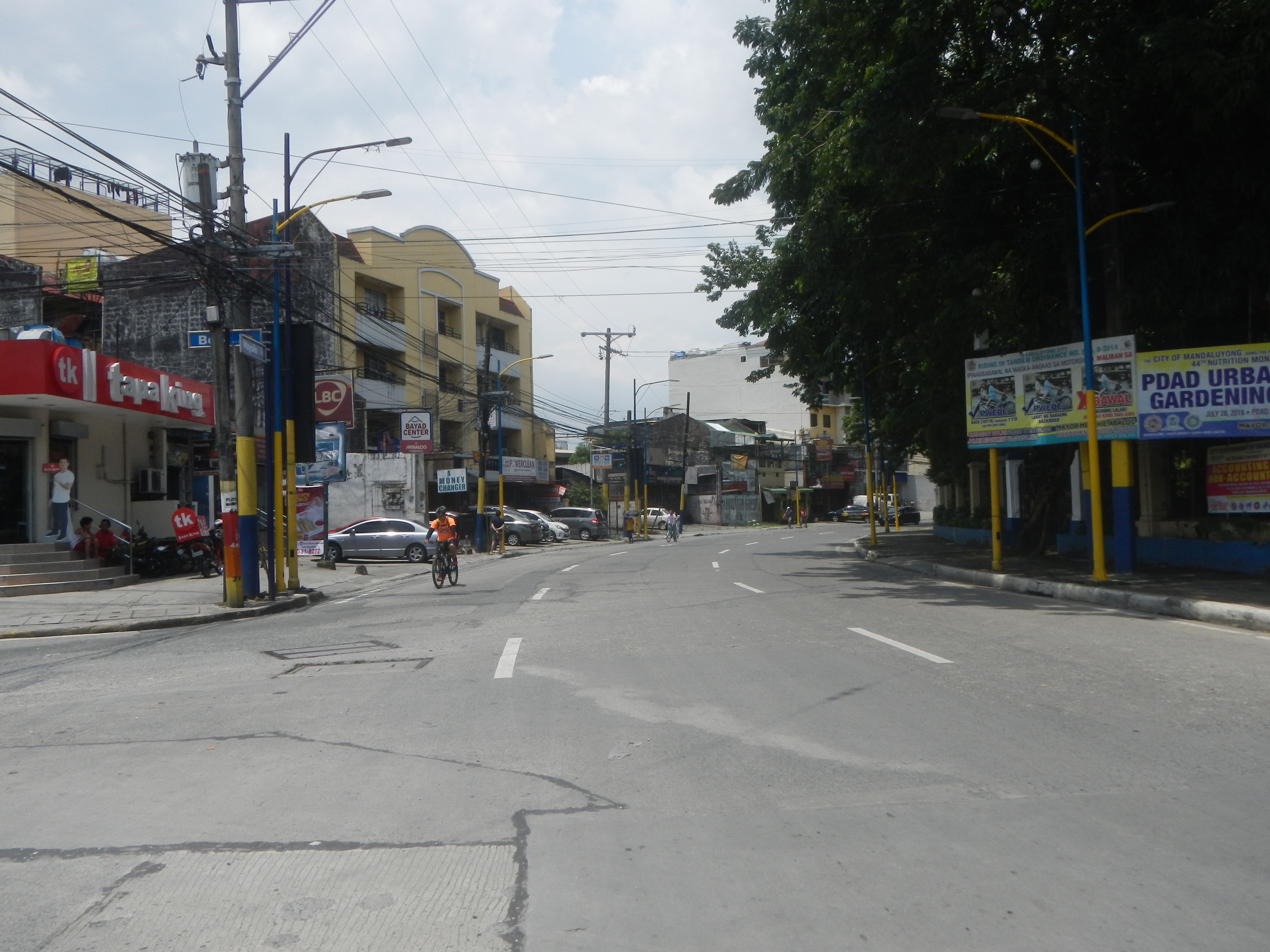
Maysilo Circle

Roads in Mandaluyong (14)
Route	Name	Type	Traffic direction	# of lanes	Barangays	Notes
	Acacia Lane	Tertiary	two-way	2–4	Hagdang Bato Libis and Addition Hills	Also known as Welfareville Road. Road terminates at Shaw Boulevard in the north and loops around the Welfareville Compound in the south.
	A. Bonifacio Road	Tertiary	two-way	2	Mabini-J. Rizal and Hagdang Bato Itaas	
	A. Luna Road	Tertiary	two-way	2	Hagdang Bato Itaas and Hagdang Bato Libis	
	Barangka Drive	Tertiary	one-way, two-way	2	Highway Hills, Mauway, Barangka Itaas, Barangka Ibaba, Hulo	Road continues as Domingo M. Guevara Street in the north. Leads to Estrella–Pantaleon Bridge in the south.
	Boni Avenue	Tertiary	two-way	2–8	Old Zañiga and Ilaya	Road continues as Rev. Aglipay Street in the west and as Pioneer Street in the east.
C-4; N1	EDSA	Primary	two-way	10–12	Wack-Wack Greenhills	
	F.B. Martinez Avenue	City Road	two-way	4	Pleasant Hills, Addition Hills, Plainview	
	General Kalentong Street	Tertiary	two-way	2–4	Old Zañiga and Daang Bakal	Road continues as New Panaderos Extension and F. Roxas Street in the southwest and as F. Blumentritt Street in the northwest.
	Luna Mencias Road	Tertiary	two-way	2	Addition Hills	Road terminates at P. Guevarra Street in the north and terminates at Shaw Boulevard in the south.
	New Panaderos Extension	Tertiary	two-way	4–6	Mabini-J. Rizal and Namayan	Road continues northeast as General Kalentong Street
	Nueve de Pebrero Street	Tertiary	two-way	2–4	Hagdang Bato Libis and Mauway	Also known as 9 de Febero Street and formerly known as Psychopathic Hospital Road. Road continues as Gomezville Street in the northwest and as Arayat Street in the east.
N184	Ortigas Avenue	Primary	two-way	6–8	Wack-Wack Greenhills	
	Pioneer Street	Tertiary	two-way	4	Ilaya	Road continues west as Boni Avenue and terminates at Shaw Boulevard in the northeast.
R-5; N141	Shaw Boulevard	Secondary	two-way	4–8	Daang Bakal, Addition Hills, Highway Hills, Wack-Wack Greenhills East	Road continues as P. Sanchez Road in the west and continues as Pasig Boulevard in the east.

==== Marikina ====
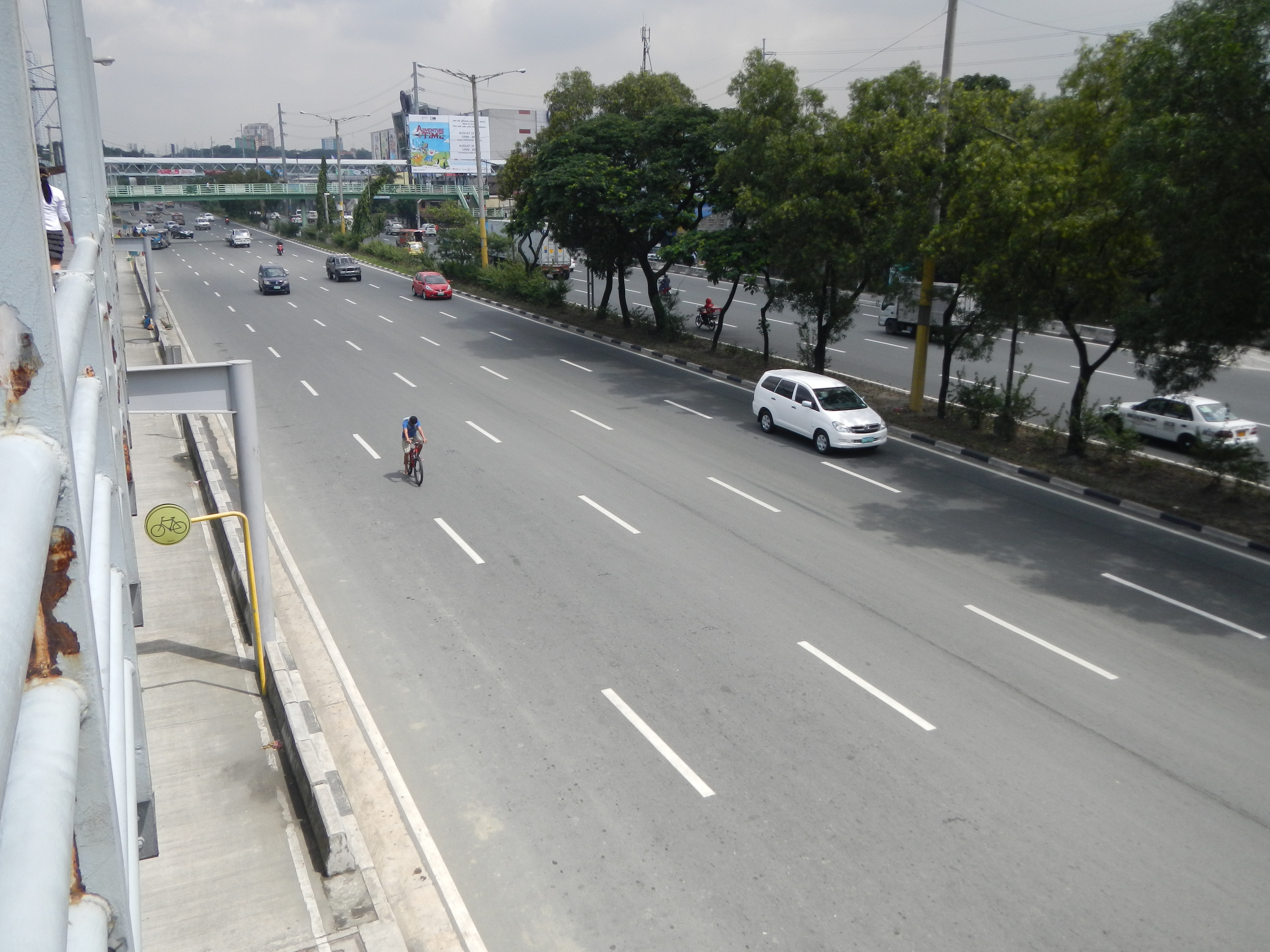
Marcos Highway

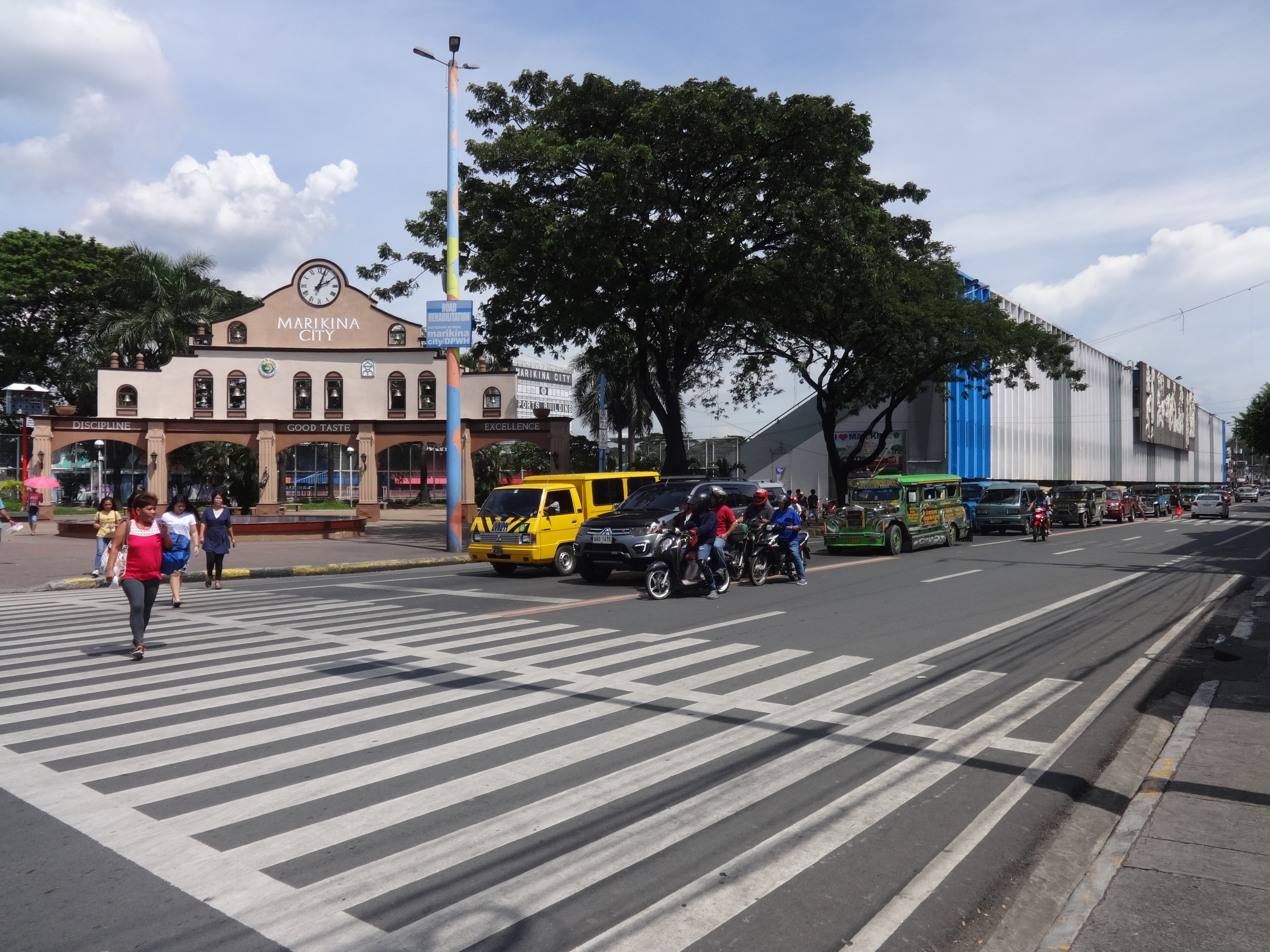
Shoe Avenue

Roads in Marikina (12)
Route	Name	Type	Traffic direction	# of lanes	Barangays	Notes
	A. Bonifacio Avenue	Secondary	two-way	4	Barangka, Tañong, Jesus Dela Peña	Road continues east as Sumulong Highway, and terminates at Marilaque Highway
	Bagong Farmers Avenue 1	Tertiary	two-way	4	Tumana	Road continues west as Katipunan Street Extension in Quezon City
	Bayan-Bayanan Avenue	Tertiary	two-way	4	Concepcion Uno, Marikina Heights	Road continues east as Liwasang Kalayaan Circle Road
C-5; N11	FVR (Fidel V. Ramos) Road	Primary	two-way	6-8	Industrial Valley Complex	Known as C5 Access Road, road continues south as Eulogio Rodriguez Jr. Avenue in Quezon City
	General Ordoñez Avenue	Tertiary	two-way	2-4	Marikina Heights	Formerly known as Molave Street; a type of ring road
	J.P. Rizal Street	Secondary	two-way	2-4	Calumpang, San Roque, Santa Elena, Santo Niño, Malanday, Concepcion Uno, Nangka	Road continues north as General Luna Avenue in San Mateo, Rizal
	Katipunan Street	Tertiary	two-way	2	Concepcion Uno, Concepcion Dos, Marikina Heights	Road continues south in Cainta, Rizal
	Lilac Street	Tertiary	two-way	2	Concepcion Dos	Road continues south as Hon. B. Soliven Avenue in Antipolo, Rizal
R-6; N59	Marikina–Infanta Highway	Primary	two-way	8-10	Barangka, Calumpang, San Roque	Known as Marilaque Highway and Marcos Highway
	Mayor Gil Fernando Avenue	Secondary	two-way	4	San Roque, Santa Elena, Santo Niño	Formerly known as Angel Tuazon Avenue; road continues south as Felix Avenue in Cainta, Rizal
	Shoe Avenue	Tertiary	two-way	4	San Roque, Santa Elena, Santo Niño	Formerly the line of old train tracks of PNR Rosario-Montalban branch; road continues north as Daang Bakal Road
	Sumulong Highway	Secondary	two-way	6	Santo Niño	Road continues west as A. Bonifacio Avenue

==== Pasig ====
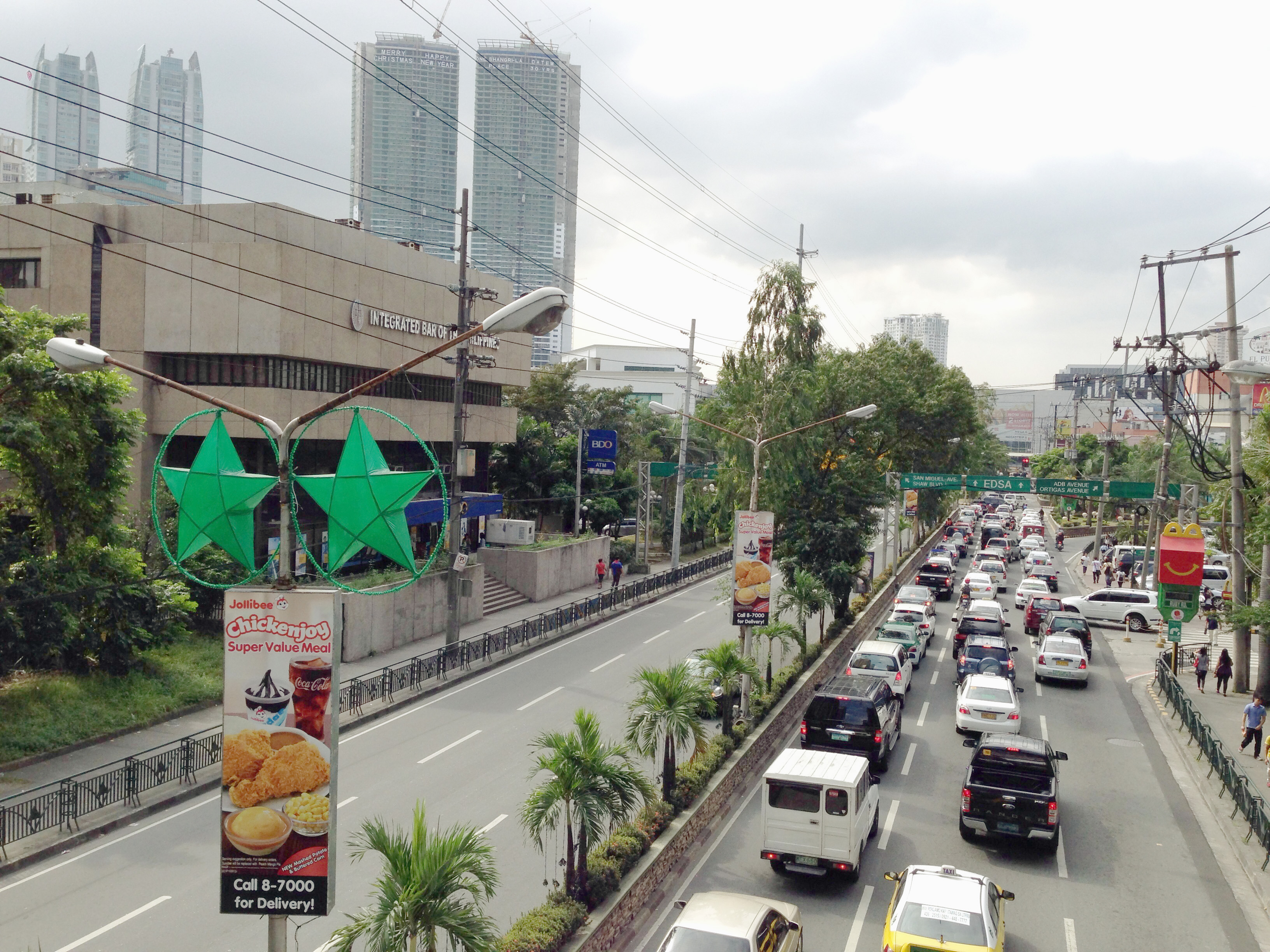
Julia Vargas Avenue

Roads in Pasig (17)
Route	Name	Traffic direction	# of lanes	Barangays	Notes
	A. Luna Avenue			San Nicolas and San Joaquin	Road continues as A. Mabini Street.
	ADB Avenue	two-way	4–6	San Antonio and Ugong	
	Lopez Jaena Street	two-way	2–4	Caniogan and Kapasigan	
	Cipriano Raymundo Avenue	two-way		Santa Lucia and Kapasigan	Road continues as Tramo Street
	Dr. Sixto Antonio Avenue	two-way		Santa Lucia and San Nicolas	
	East Bank Road	two-way		Manggahan and Santa Lucia	
	Eulogio Amang Avenue	two-way	4	Santolan and Santa Lucia	
C-5; N11	Eulogio Jr. Avenue	two-way	8–10	Ugong and Bagong Ilog	Road continues south as Carlos P. Garcia Avenue
	Julia Vargas Avenue	one-way, two-way	4–6	San Antonio and Ugong	Road starts from EDSA and ends at Eulogio Jr. Avenue
	Lanuza Avenue	two-way	4–6	Ugong	
	Meralco Avenue	two-way	4–8	Ugong and San Antonio	
R-5; N60	Ortigas Avenue	two-way	6–8	Ugong, Santa Lucia, and Rosario	Road continues east as Corazon C. Aquino Avenue in Taytay, Rizal
	Pasig Boulevard	two-way	4	Bagong Ilog and Sagad	Road is a southeast continuation of Shaw Boulevard.
	Pioneer Street	two-way	4	Kapitolyo	
	San Miguel Avenue	two-way	6	San Antonio	
R-5; N141	Shaw Boulevard	two-way	4–8		Road continues southeast as Pasig Boulevard.
	West Bank Road	two-way		Manggahan and Santa Lucia	

==== Quezon City ====
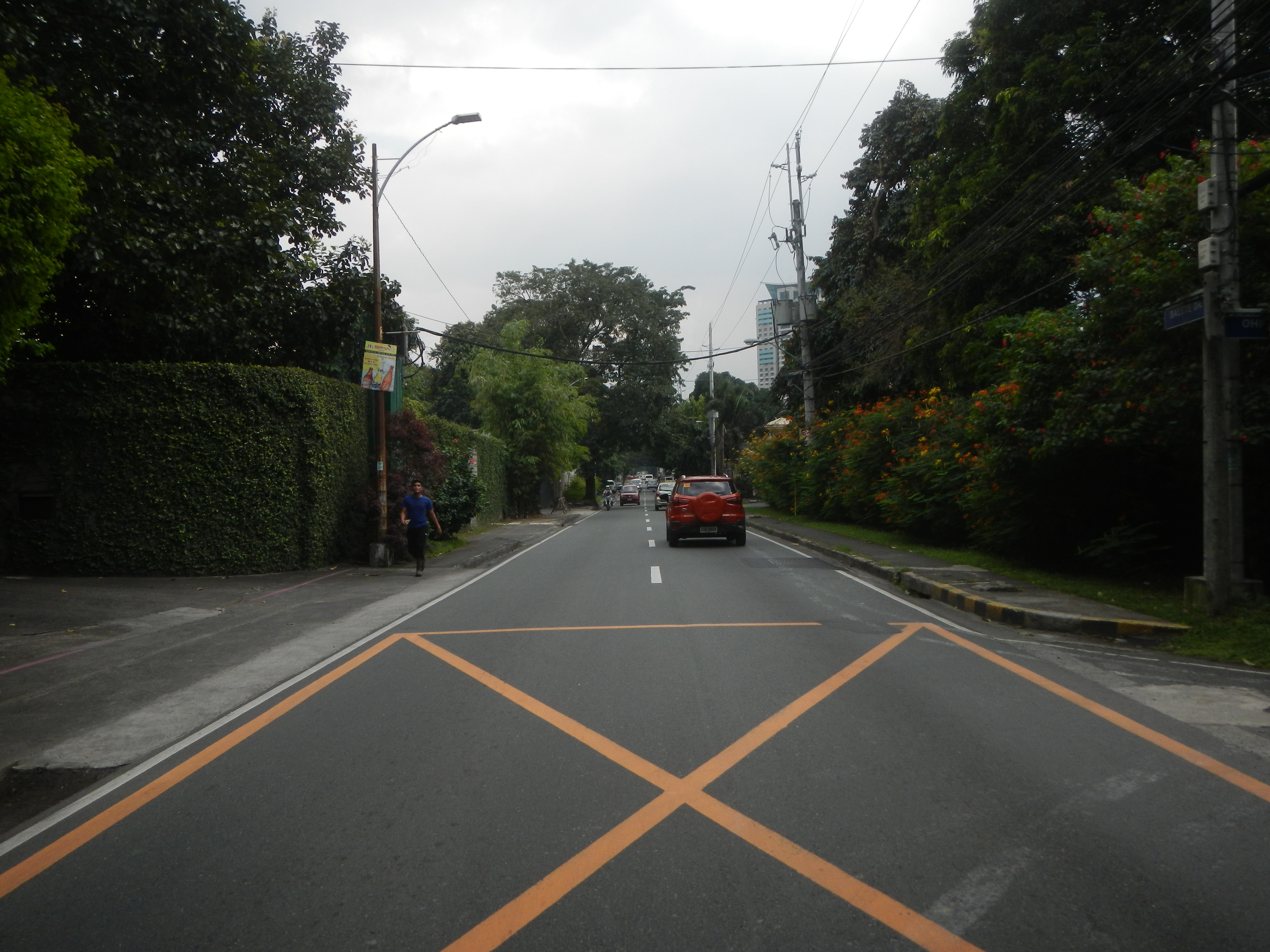
Balete Drive

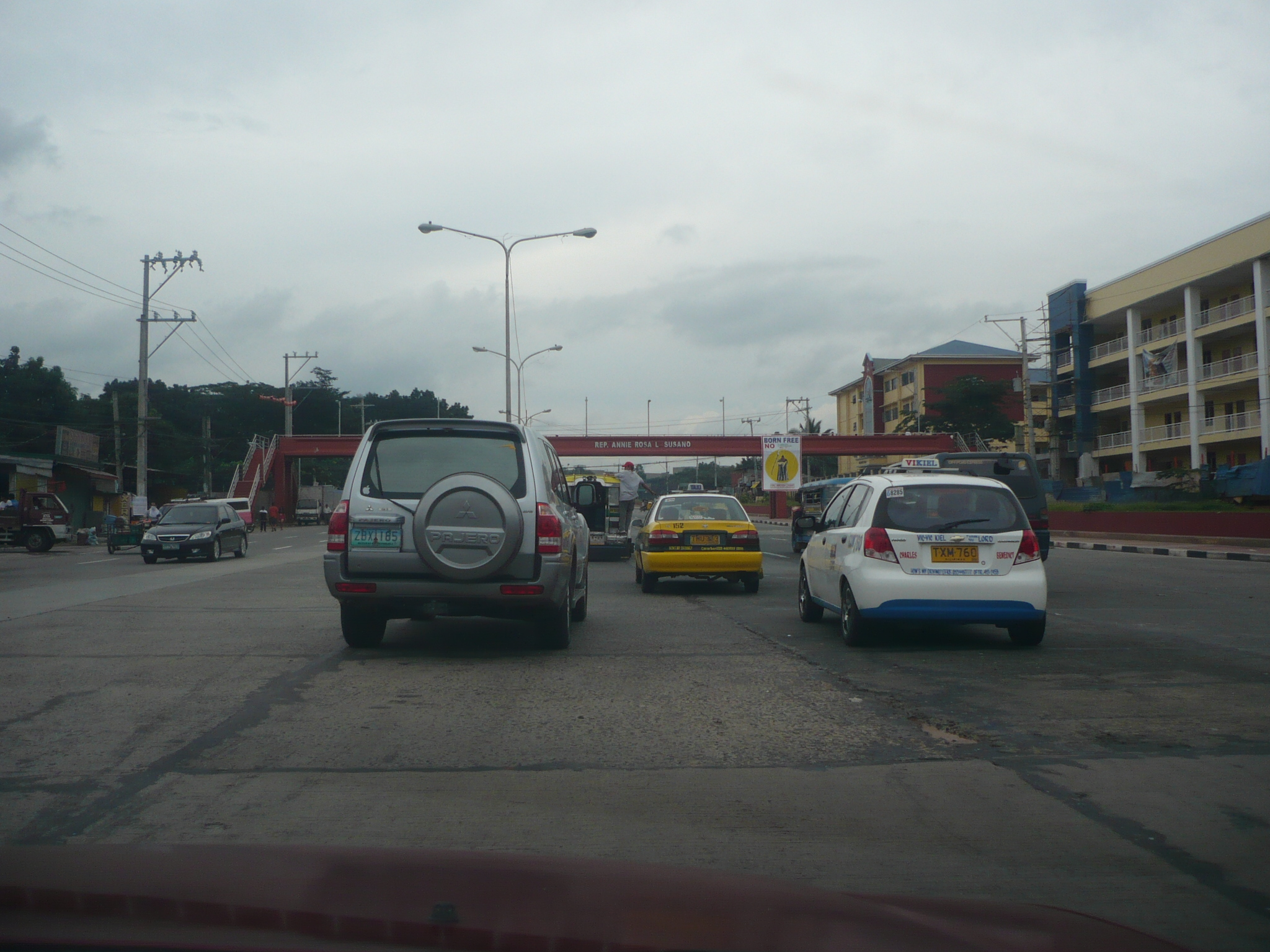
Batasan Road

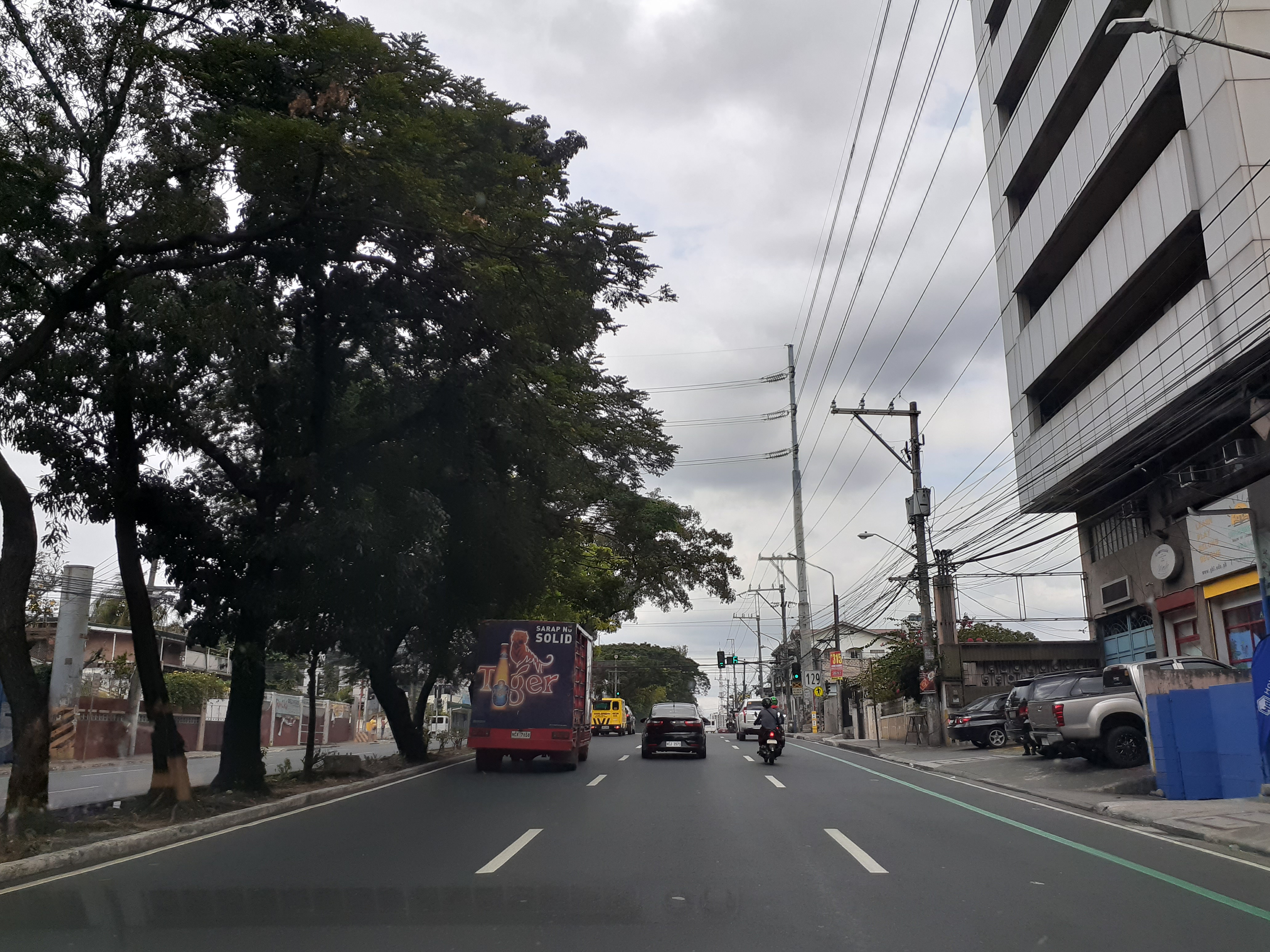
Congressional Avenue

- N.S. Amoranto Sr. Avenue (formerly called Retiro and C. Adan)
- Balete Drive (New Manila neighborhood of Quezon City)
- Banawe Street (Santa Mesa Heights neighborhood of Quezon City)
- Batasan Road (Batasan Hills, Quezon City; also known as IBP Road)
- Batasan-San Mateo Road (Batasan Road in Quezon City to San Mateo, Rizal)
- Broadway Avenue – (formerly Doña Juana Rodriguez; New Manila neighborhood of Quezon City)
- Bonny Serrano Avenue (formerly and still called Santolan Road; Katipunan Avenue to Ortigas Avenue) – N185
- D. Tuazon Street (Sgt. Rivera Avenue to E. Rodriguez Sr. Avenue in Quezon City)
- Del Monte Avenue (A. Bonifacio Ave. to West Ave.; San Francisco del Monte neighborhood of Quezon City)
- Don A. Roces Avenue (Quezon Avenue to Tomas Morato in Quezon City)
- Doña Hemady Street (N. Domingo to E. Rodriguez, Sr. Ave.; New Manila neighborhood of Quezon City)
- East Avenue (Diliman neighborhood of Quezon City) – N174
- Eulogio Rodriguez Sr. Avenue (Mabuhay Rotunda to Cubao District of Quezon City)
- General Luis Street (Novaliches) - N118
- Gilmore Avenue (New Manila neighborhood of Quezon City, continues to San Juan as Ortigas Avenue)
- Greenmeadows Avenue (C5 to Ortigas Avenue)
- Kalayaan Avenue (Elliptical Road to Kamias Road)
- Kamias Road (EDSA to Kalayaan Avenue)
- Mayon Street (La Loma neighborhood of Quezon City)
- Mindanao Avenue (Regalado to Commonwealth Avenue; not to be confused with Mindanao Avenue of C-5 Road)
- North Avenue (Project 6 neighborhood of Quezon City) – N173
- Regalado Avenue (North Fairview District)
- Regalado Highway (Commonwealth Avenue to Quirino Highway in Fairview District, Quezon City)
- Roosevelt Avenue (Quezon Avenue to EDSA in Quezon City)
- Susano Road (Novaliches)
- Timog Avenue (Barangay Laging Handa of Quezon City; Timog is Tagalog for "south") – N172
- Times Street (Barangay West Triangle; exclusive neighborhood of Quezon City)
- Tomas Morato Avenue (ABS-CBN Compound in South Triangle to E. Rodriguez Sr. Avenue in Quezon City)
- Visayas Avenue (Quezon Memorial Circle to Tandang Sora Avenue in Quezon City)
- West Avenue (Project 7 neighborhood of Quezon City) – N171
- White Plains Avenue (Temple Drive to EDSA)
- Zabarte Road (Quirino Highway to Caloocan)

==== San Juan ====
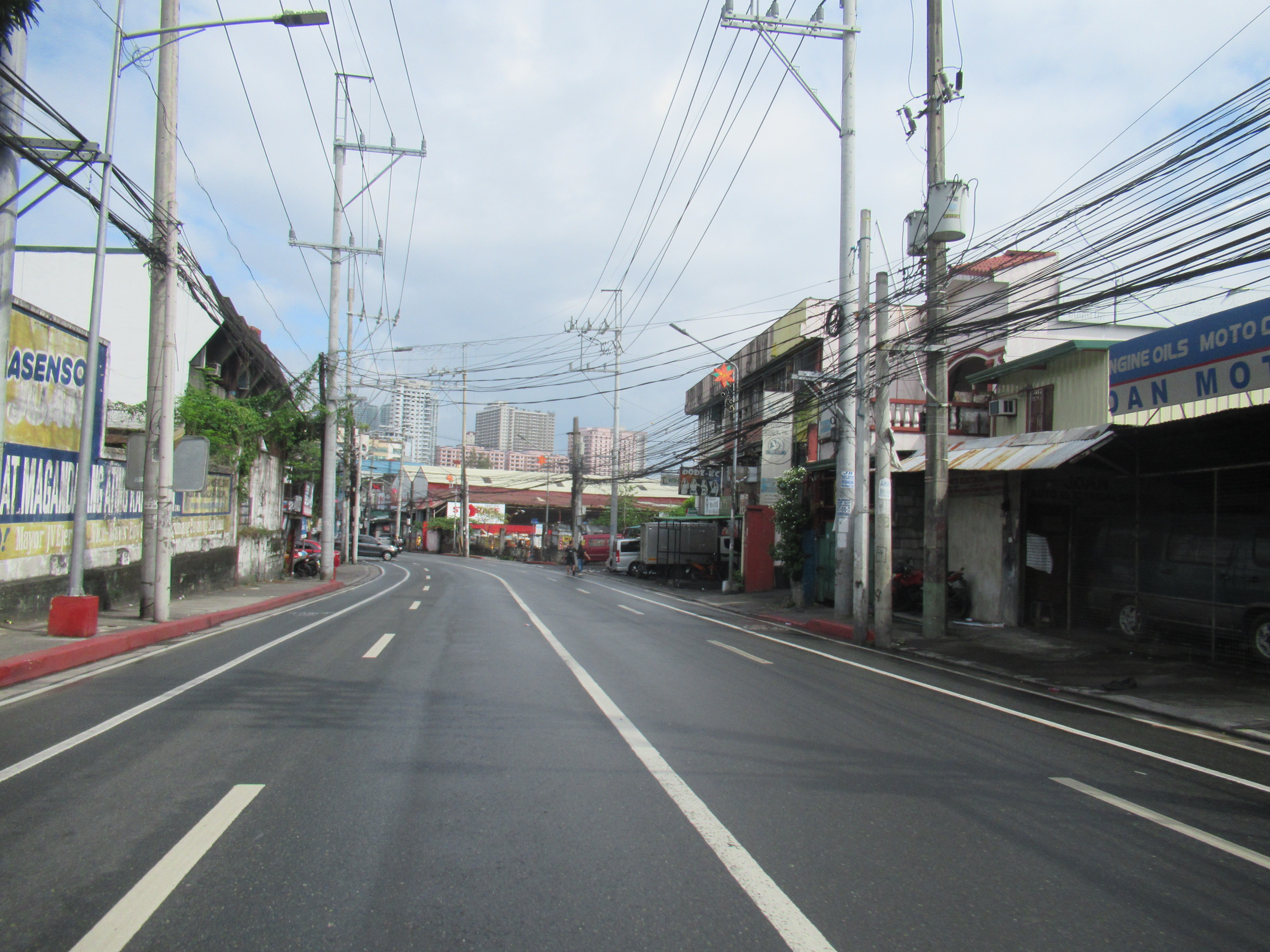
N. Domingo Street

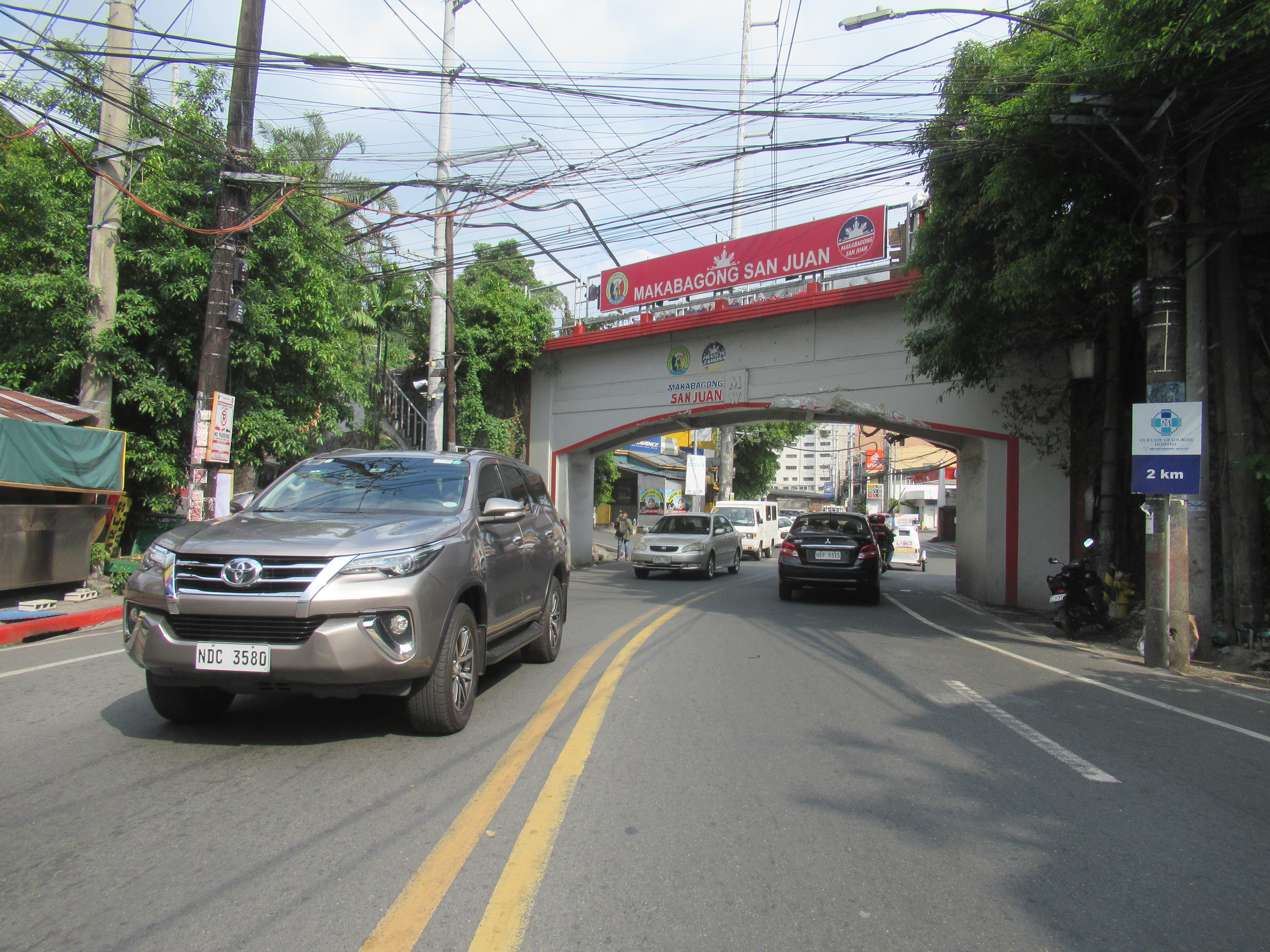
F. Blumentritt Street

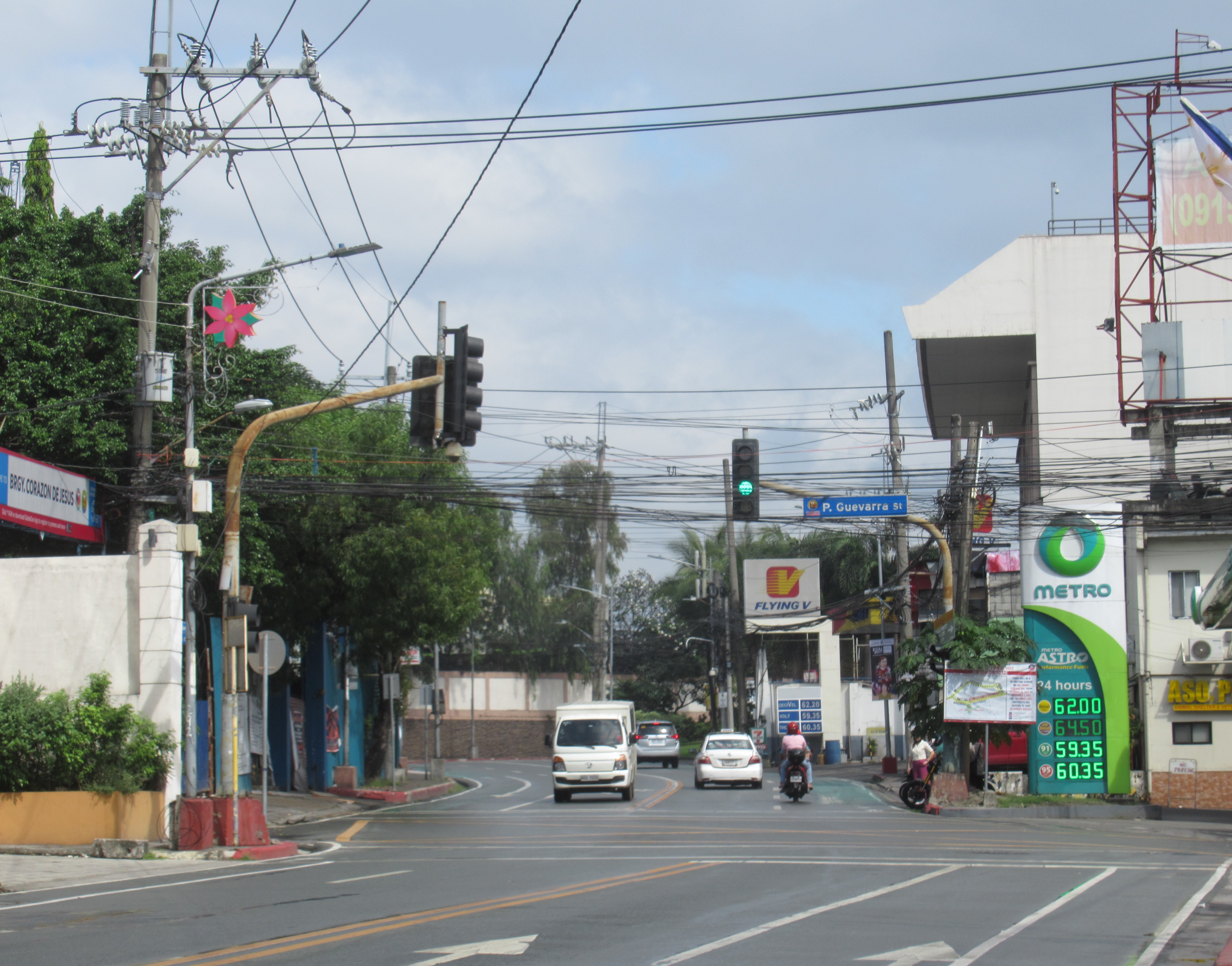
Pinaglabanan Street corner P. Guevarra Street

Roads in San Juan (11)
Route	Name	Traffic direction	# of lanes	Barangays	Notes
R-6; N180	Aurora Boulevard	two-way	4	Ermitaño, Balong-Bato, Salapan	
C-4; N1	EDSA	two-way	8–10	Greenhills	
	F. Blumentritt Street	two-way	2–4	Rivera, San Perfecto, Pedro Cruz, Batis, Tibagan, Kabayanan	Road continues as General Kalentong Street.
	F. Manalo Street	two-way	2	Onse, Santa Lucia, Maytunas, Kabayanan, Batis, San Perfecto	
C-3	Gregorio Araneta Avenue	two-way	6–8	Progreso	
	Luna-Mencias Street	one-way	2	Addition Hills	
	M.J. Paterno Street	two-way	2	Pasadeña	
	N. Domingo Street	two-way	2–4	Progreso, San Perfecto, Rivera, Pedro Cruz, Balong-Bato, Corazon de Jesus, Ermitaño, Pasadeña	Road continues west as Old Santa Mesa Road.
N184	Ortigas Avenue	two-way	4–8	Greenhills	Road continues west as Granada Street.
	Pedro Guevarra Street	one-way, two-way	2	Maytunas, Addition Hills, Santa Lucia, Little Baguio, St. Joseph, Corazon De Jesus	
	Pinaglabanan Street	two-way	2–6	Pedro Cruz, Balong-Bato, Corazon de Jesus	Road continues as Bonny Serrano Avenue.

=== Northern Manila District (Camanava) ===
==== Caloocan ====
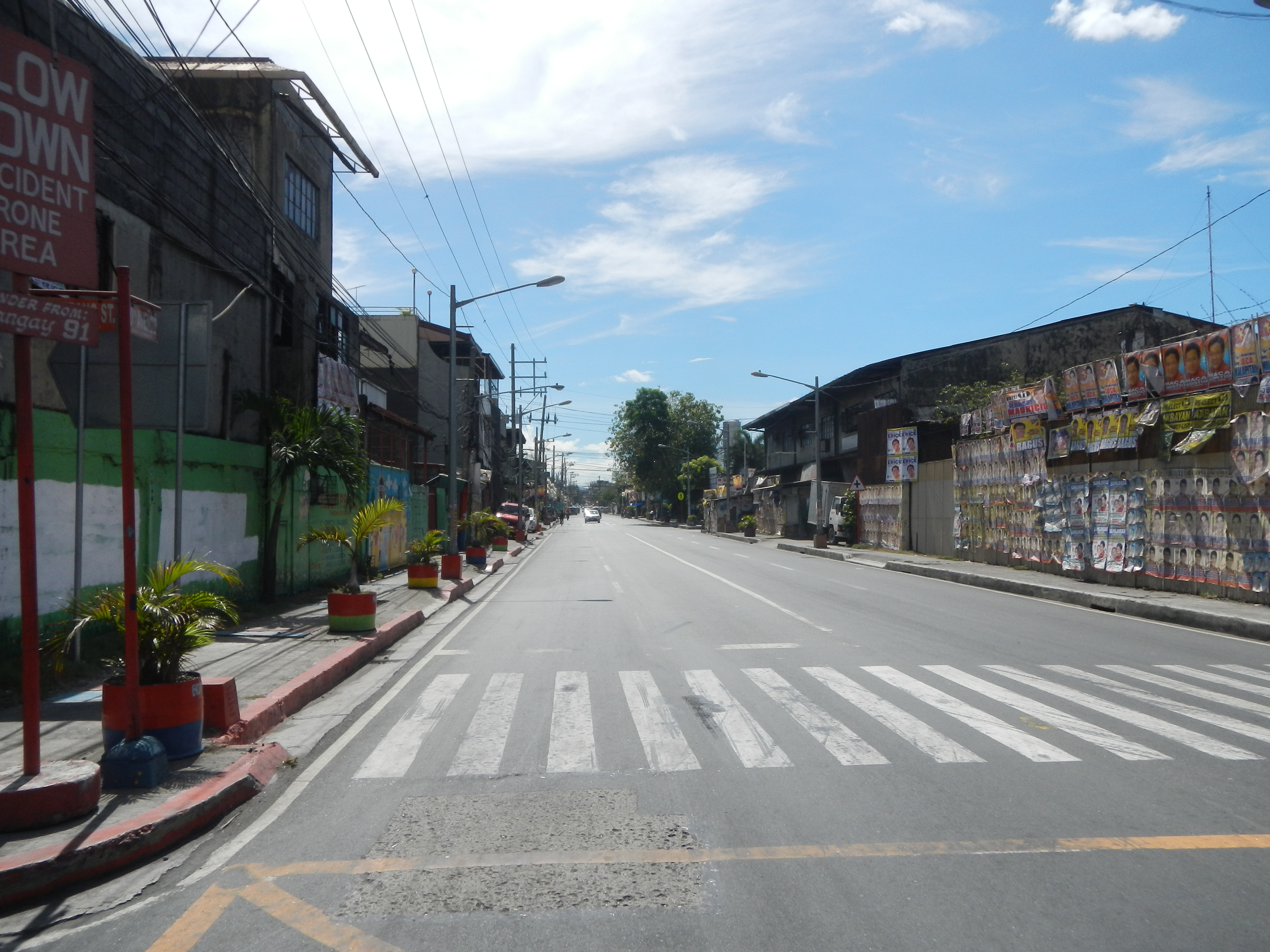
10th Avenue

South Caloocan

- 5th Avenue – N130
- 10th Avenue
- A. Mabini Street
- Samson Road – N120

North Caloocan

- Camarin Road
- Deparo Road
- Susano Road
- Zabarte Road

==== Malabon ====
- Governor Pascual Avenue
- Paterio Aquino Avenue

==== Navotas ====
- North Bay Boulevard

==== Valenzuela ====
- General Luis Street - N118
- Maysan Road – N118

=== Southern Manila District ===
==== Las Piñas ====
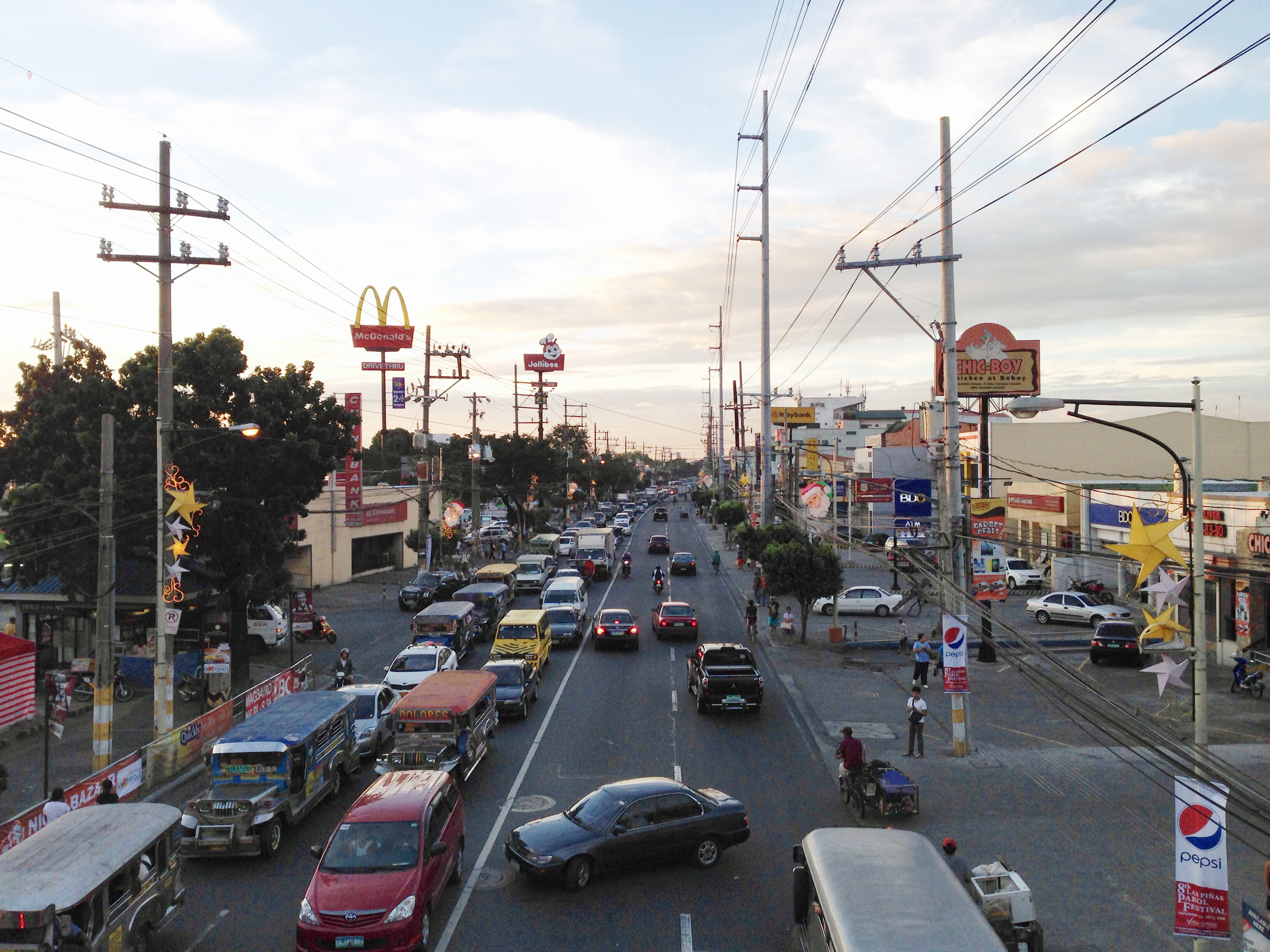
Alabang–Zapote Road

Roads in Las Piñas ()
Route	Name	Traffic direction	Barangays	Notes
N411	Alabang-Zapote Road	two-way		
	CAA Road	two-way		
	Daang Hari Road	two-way		
N62	Diego Cera Avenue	two-way		
	J. Aguilar Avenue	two-way		
	Marcos Alvarez Avenue	two-way		
	Naga Road Avenue	two-way		

==== Makati ====
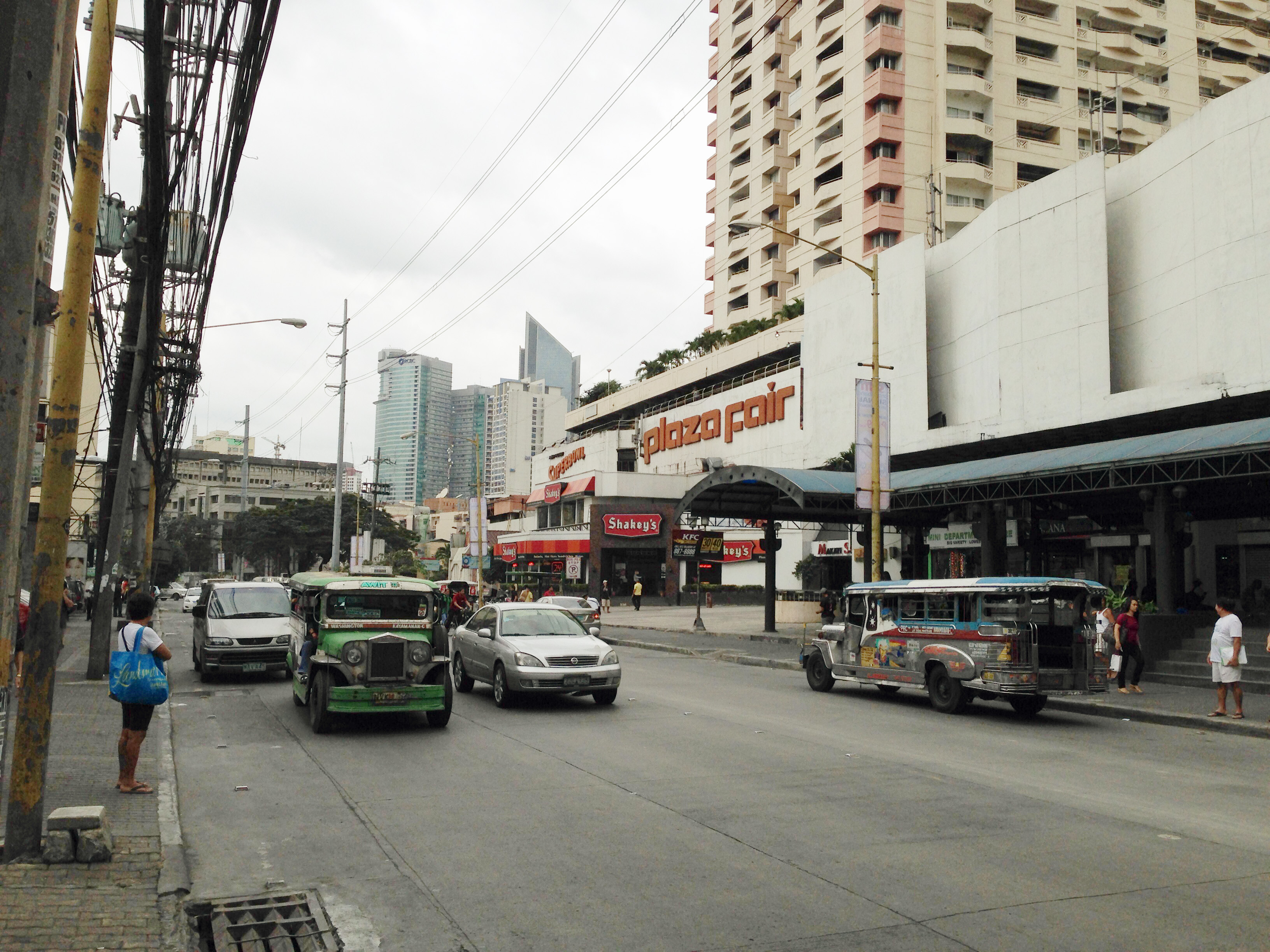
Chino Roces Avenue

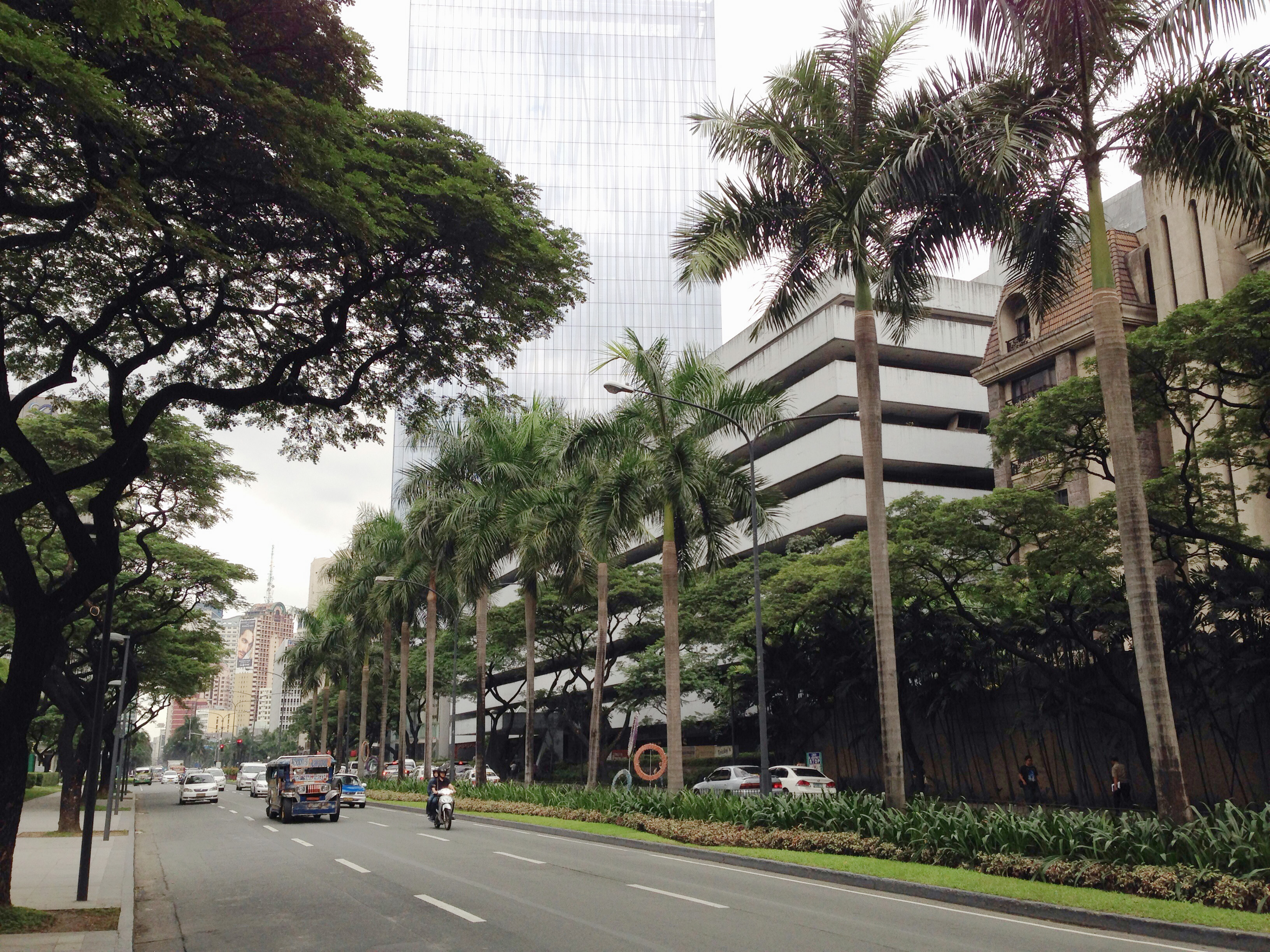
Makati Avenue

Roads in Makati (15)
Route	Name	Designation	Barangays	Notes
	Amorsolo Street	national tertiary road	Pio del Pilar, San Lorenzo, Dasmariñas	
	Arnaiz Avenue	national tertiary road	San Lorenzo, Bangkal, Pio del Pilar	
C-3	Ayala Avenue	private road	San Lorenzo, Urdaneta, Bel-Air, San Antonio, Pio del Pilar	
	Chino Roces Avenue	national tertiary road	Dasmariñas, La Paz, Olympia, Pio del Pilar, San Antonio, Bangkal, Tejeros	
C-4; N1 / AH26	EDSA	national primary road	Guadalupe VIejo, Guadalupe Nuevo, Bel-Air, Pinagkaisahan, Urdaneta, Forbes Park, San Lorenzo, Dasmariñas, Bangkal, Magallanes	
	Estrella Street	national tertiary road	Bel-Air, Poblacion, Guadalupe Viejo	
C-3 N190	Gil Puyat Avenue	national secondary road	Bel-Air, Palanan, Pio del Pilar, San Antonio, San Lorenzo, Urdaneta	
	Jose P. Rizal Avenue	national tertiary road	Guadalupe Nuevo, Guadalupe Viejo, Poblacion, Valenzuela, Olympia, Tejeros	
	Kalayaan Avenue	national tertiary road	Singkamas to Poblacion in Makati and Pinagkaisahan to Guadalupe Nuevo, with a short span of the avenue entering Pitogo, Taguig before its reentry again to Makati	
	McKinley Road	national tertiary road	Dasmariñas, Forbes Park	
	Makati Avenue	private road (within Makati CBD), national tertiary road	San Lorenzo, Urdaneta, Bel-Air, Poblacion	
	Nicanor Garcia Street	city road	Bel-Air, Valenzuela, Poblacion	
R-3 N145	Osmeña Highway	national secondary road	Palanan, San Isidro, Pio del Pilar, Bangkal, San Lorenzo	
	Paseo de Roxas	private road	San Lorenzo, Bel-Air, Urdaneta	
C-3	South Avenue	national tertiary road	Santa Cruz, Olympia	

==== Muntinlupa ====
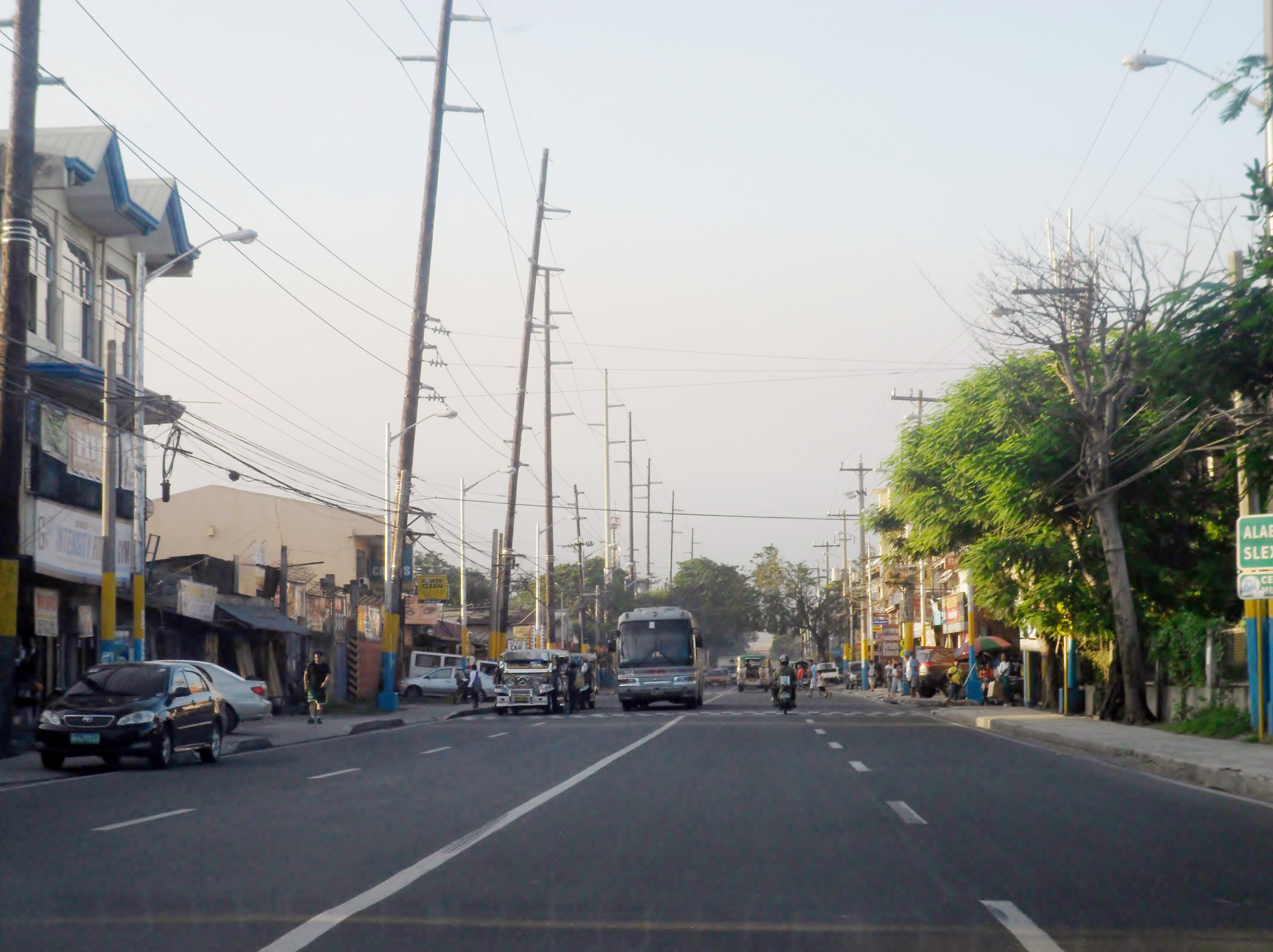
Manila South Road

Roads in Muntinlupa (8)
Route	Name	Designation	Barangays	Notes
N411	Alabang-Zapote Road	national secondary road	Ayala Alabang, Alabang	
	Commerce Avenue	private road	Ayala Alabang, Alabang	Serves Ayala Alabang Village, Madrigal Business Park and Filinvest City
	Daang Hari Road	national secondary road	Ayala Alabang	Mostly travels along Las Piñas-Muntinlupa boundary
	Filinvest Avenue	private road	Alabang	serves Filinvest City
N142	Manuel L. Quezon Avenue	national secondary road	Alabang, Sucat	
N143	Meralco Road	national secondary road	Sucat	
N1	National Road (Manila South Road/Maharlika Highway)	national primary road	Alabang, Bayanan, Putatan, Poblacion, Tunasan	
E2	Muntinlupa–Cavite Expressway	expressway	Poblacion	

==== Parañaque ====
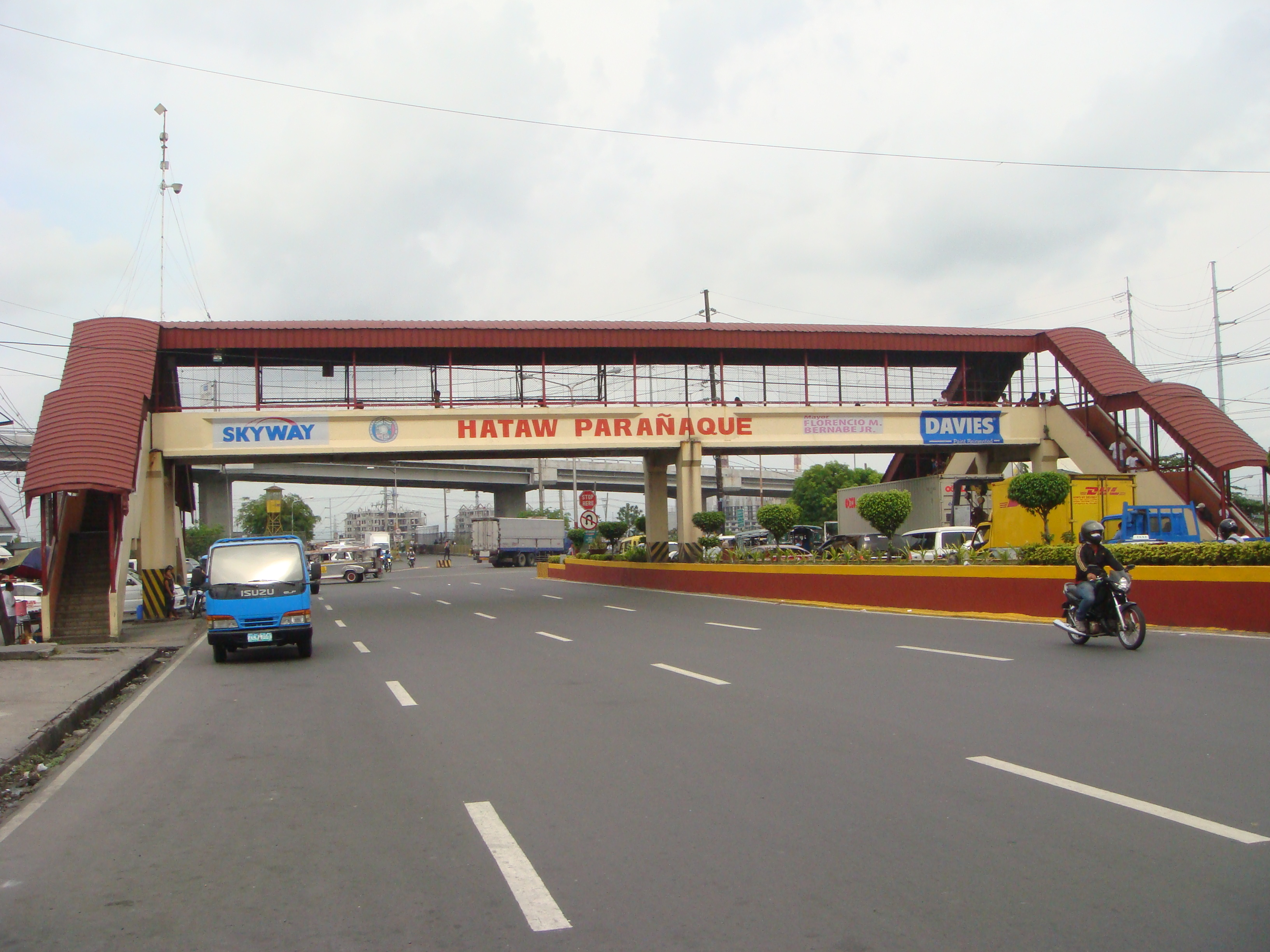
Dr. A. Santos Avenue

Roads in Parañaque (8)
Route	Name	Designation	Barangays	Notes
	Aseana Avenue	private road		
N63	Dr. Santos Avenue (Sucat Road)	national primary		
	Doña Soledad Avenue	city road		
N62	Quirino Avenue	national secondary road		
E6	NAIA Expressway	expressway		
N194	NAIA Road (MIA Road)	national secondary		
N195	Ninoy Aquino Avenue (Imelda Avenue)	national secondary		
	Pacific Avenue	private road		

==== Pasay ====
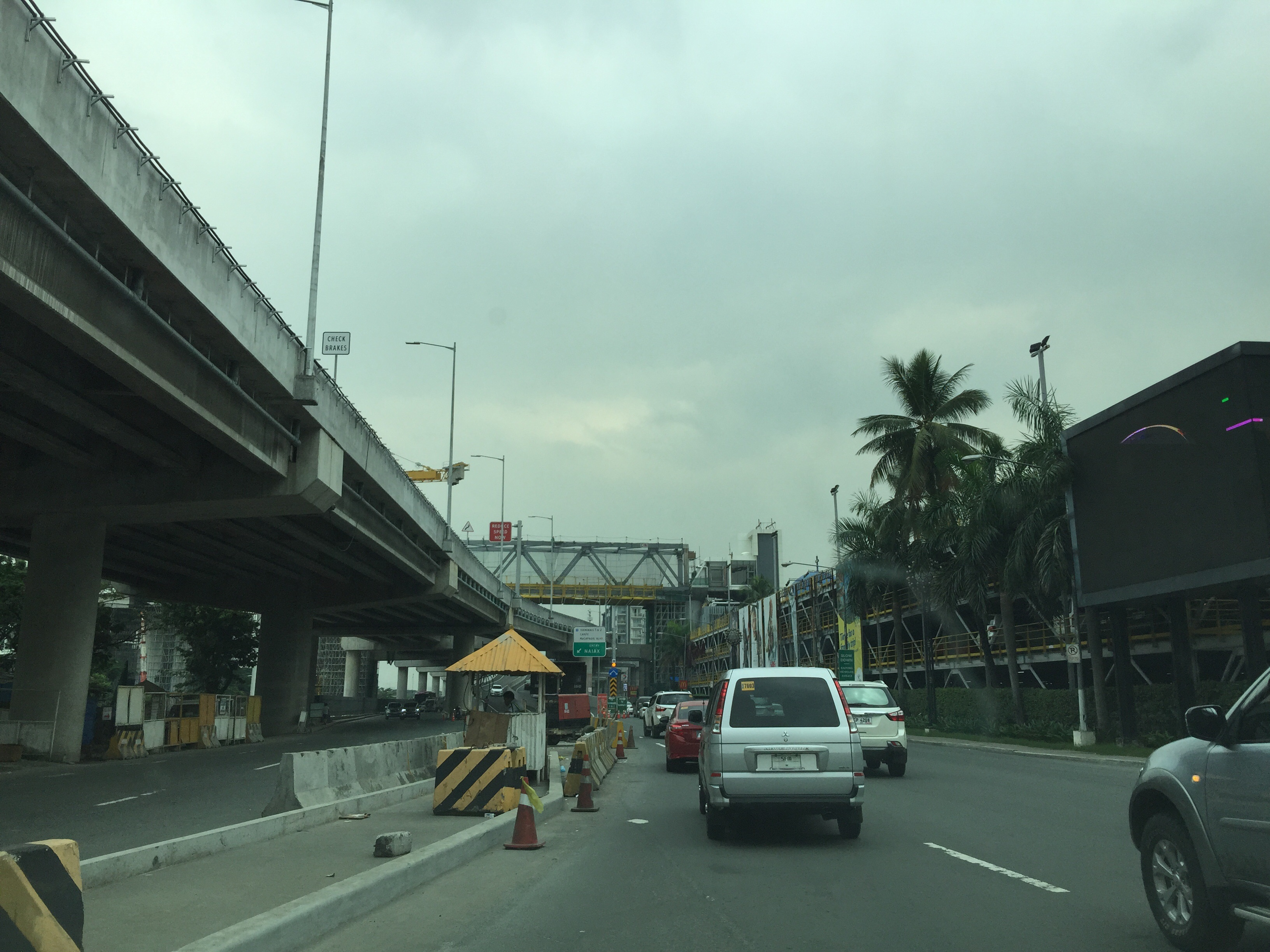
Andrews Avenue

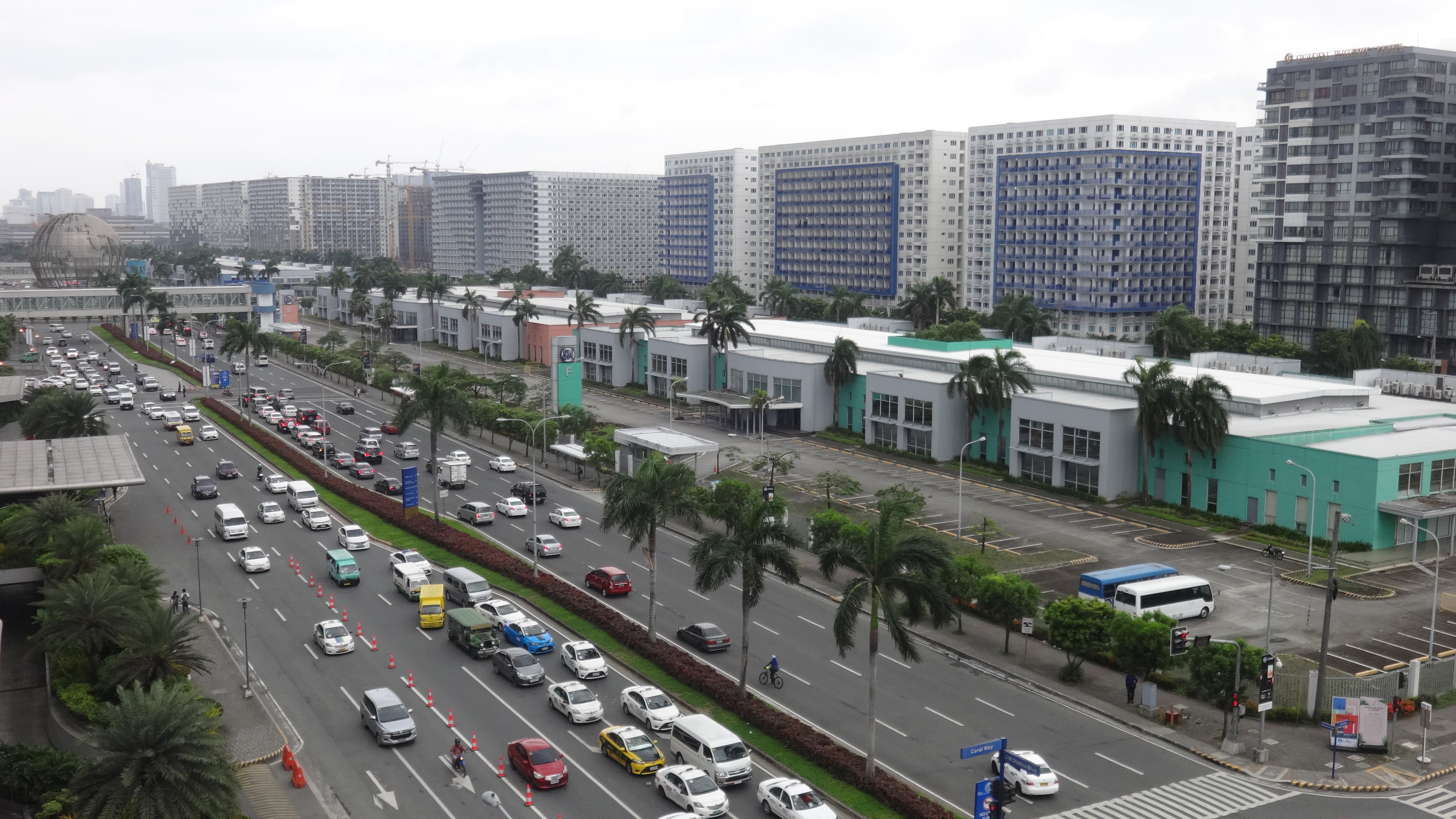
Jose W. Diokno Boulevard

Roads in Pasay (9)
Route	Name	Designation	Barangays	Notes
N192	Andrews Avenue	national secondary		
	Arnaiz Avenue (Libertad Street)	national tertiary		
N193	Domestic Road	national secondary		
	F.B. Harrison Street	national tertiary		
	Jose W. Diokno Boulevard	national tertiary		
	Macapagal Boulevard	national tertiary		
E6	NAIA Expressway	expressway		
N194	NAIA Road (MIA Road)	national secondary		
N191	Tramo Street	national secondary		

==== Pateros ====
- B. Morcilla Street (Pateros town proper)
- Jose P. Rizal Avenue Extension (also known as Guadalupe-Pateros Road)
- M. Almeda Street (Gen. Luna Street in Taguig to R. Jabson Street in Pasig)
- P. Rosales Street (going to Tipas area in Taguig)

==== Taguig ====
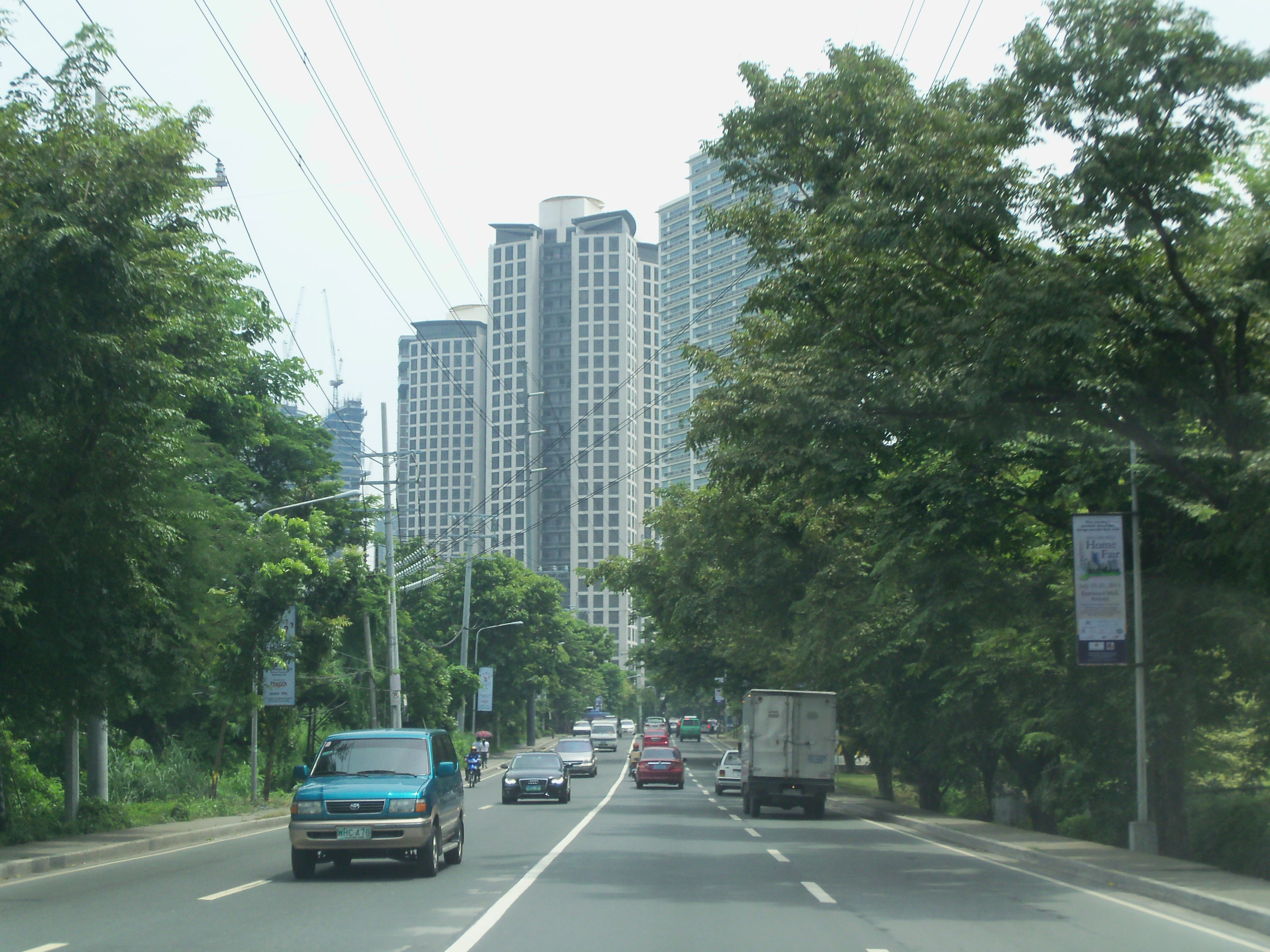
Lawton Avenue

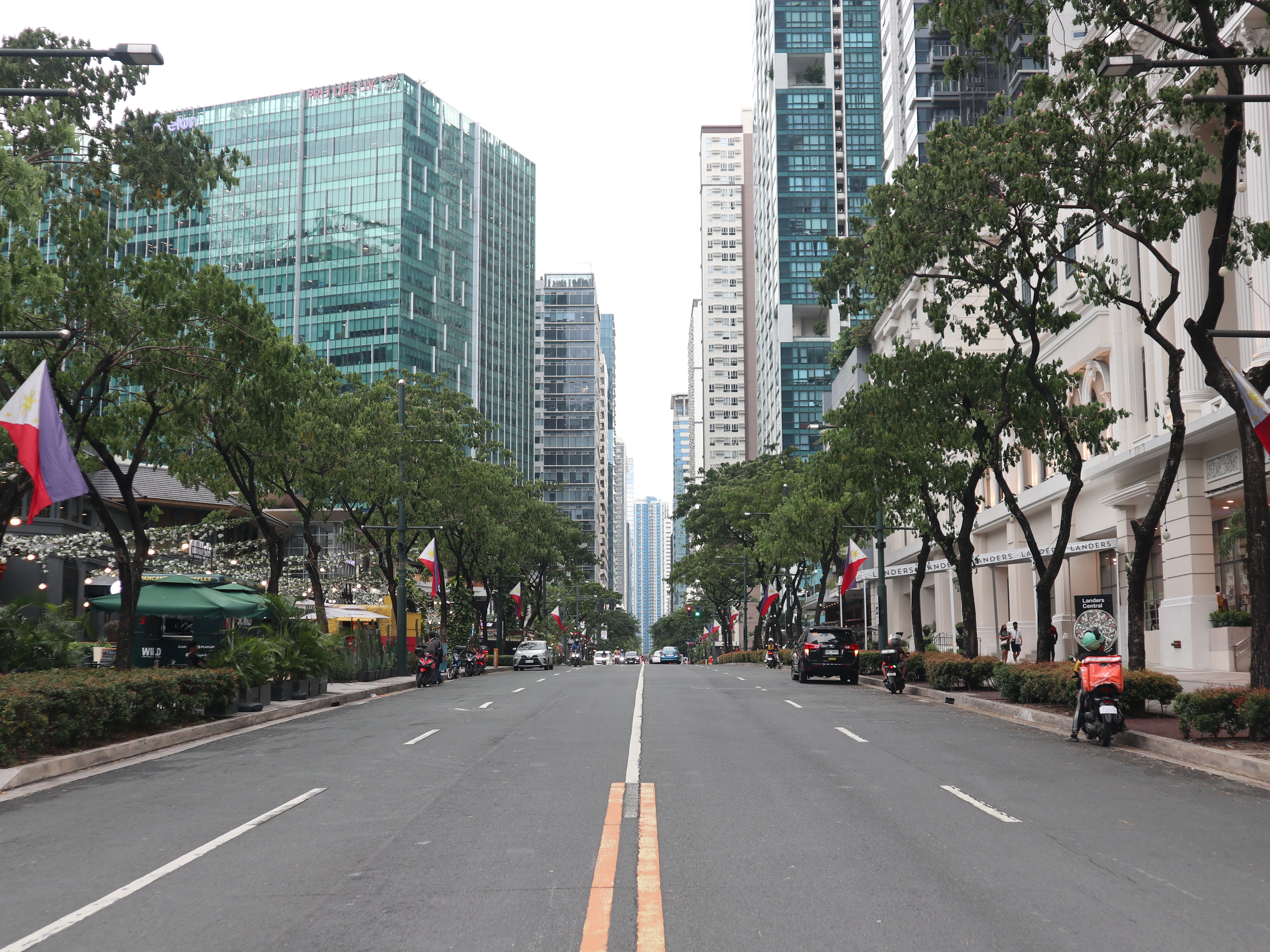
11th Avenue

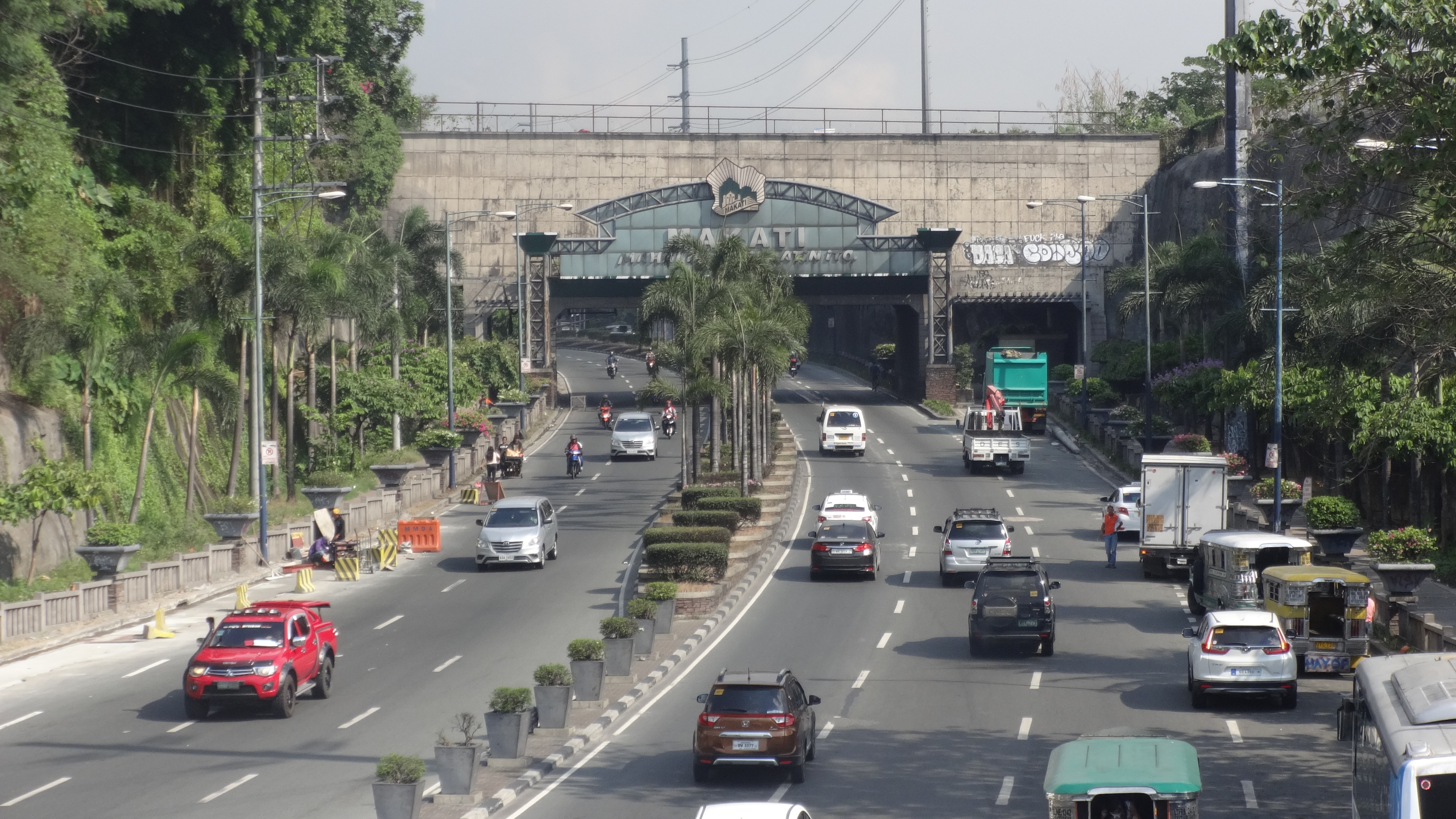
Kalayaan Avenue

Roads in Taguig (21)
Route	Name	Type	Traffic direction	# of lanes	Barangays / districts	Notes
	5th Avenue		two-way (from Lawton Avenue to 32nd Street) one way (from 32nd Street to 34th Street)	4–6	Bonifacio Global City	Road continues south as Lawton Avenue
	8th Avenue		two-way (from 34th Street up to Lawton Avenue) one way (from 34th Street to Justicia Drive)	2–6	Bonifacio Global City	Road continues north as Lawton Avenue in Post Proper Northside while it continues south as Justicia Drive; A small disconnected segment of 8th Avenue is located starting at Manila American Cemetery up to McKinley Parkway
	11th Avenue		two-way	4–6	Bonifacio Global City	
	26th Street		two-way	4–6	Bonifacio Global City	Road continues east as Target Street in barangay Pembo
	32nd Street		two-way	4–8	Bonifacio Global City	Connects EDSA (C-4) and Carlos P. Garcia Avenue (C-5)
	38th Street		two-way	4–6	Bonifacio Global City	Road continues east as University Parkway
	Arca Boulevard		two-way	4–5	Arca South	
	Bagong Calzada Street	Tertiary	two-way	2	Santa Ana, Tuktukan and Ususan	Diversion road; connects M. Almeda Street in Pateros to Gen. Luna Street in barangay Santa Ana, Taguig
	Bayani Road		two-way	4–6	Western Bicutan	Road continues south as the Maria Rodriguez Tinga Avenue
	Cayetano Boulevard		two-way	4–6	Calzada-Tipas, Ligid-Tipas, Palingon-Tipas and Ususan	Road continues north as Visitacion Street
C-5	Carlos P. Garcia Avenue	Primary	two-way	6–8	East Rembo, Fort Bonifacio, Pembo, Pinagsama, Rizal, Ususan, West Rembo and Western Bicutan	
	General Luna Street	Secondary	two-way	2	Santa Ana, Tuktukan and Ususan	Road continues north as M. Almeda Street in Pateros
	General Santos Avenue	Secondary	two-way	4-6	Central Bicutan, Lower Bicutan and North Daang Hari	Road continues west as Doña Soledad Avenue in Parañaque while it continues east as the Circumferential Road 6
R-4	J. P. Rizal Avenue Extension	Tertiary	two-way	4	Cembo, Comembo, East Rembo and West Rembo	Road continues east as B. Morcilla Street in Pateros
N190	Kalayaan Avenue	Secondary	two-way	4-8	Cembo, Comembo, East Rembo and West Rembo	Road continues east as San Guillermo Avenue upon crossing Buting Bridge in Buting, Pasig
	Lawton Avenue	Tertiary	two-way	4-6	Cembo, Fort Bonifacio, Pinagsama, Post Proper Northside and Western Bicutan	A small disconnected segment traverses Cembo and Post Proper Northside which continues south as the 8th Avenue in Bonifacio Global City
	Le Grande Avenue		two-way	4	Bonifacio Capital District	
	McKinley Parkway		two-way	6	Bonifacio Global City	Road continues north as University Parkway, while the road continues west as McKinley Road in Forbes Park, Makati
	McKinley Road		two-way	4	Bonifacio Global City	A short portion is inside Bonifacio Global City while the rest of the road is in Makati; serves as an access road towards BGC
	Maria Rodriguez Tiñga Avenue		two-way	2-4	Central Signal Village, Hagonoy, New Lower Bicutan, North Signal Village and Pinagsama	
	Manuel L. Quezon Street	Secondary	two-way	2-4	Bagumbayan, Bambang, Hagonoy, Lower Bicutan, New Lower Bicutan, San Miguel, Tuktukan and Wawa	

- South Luzon Expressway
- University Parkway (Bonifacio Global City)
- Upper McKinley Road (Bonifacio Capital District)

== Mabuhay Lanes ==
Mabuhay Lanes are a network of roads in Metro Manila designated as priority traffic corridors, serving as alternate routes to the existing radial and circumferential road system of Metro Manila.

It was established in 2010 by the Metropolitan Manila Development Authority (MMDA) under chairman Francis Tolentino and Metro Manila Council through the issuance of MMDA Resolution No. 10-26 series of 2010, which designated six north-south routes parallel to the heavily congested EDSA as Christmas Lanes and Mabuhay Lanes. These routes were eventually expanded to 17 routes and retained permanently. As priority corridors, the segments of all roads designated as Mabuhay Lanes or Christmas Lanes are marked as no parking zones, no street vending zones, and no Christmas caroling zones. These segments are also subject to routine MMDA patrols that conduct vehicle impoundment via towing and clearing of other road and sidewalk obstacles.

== See also ==
- Road numbering
- List of eponymous streets in Metro Manila
- List of renamed streets in Metro Manila
- List of expressways in the Philippines
- Highways in the Philippines
