= Bagumbayan =

Bagumbayan may refer to:

== Places in the Philippines ==
- Bagumbayan, Sultan Kudarat, a municipality
- Bagumbayan Field, old name of Rizal Park, Manila
- Bagumbayan, Quezon City, a barangay in Quezon City, Eastern Manila District
- Bagumbayan, Taguig, a barangay in Southern Manila District
- Bagumbayan North, a barangay in Navotas, Northern Manila District
- Bagumbayan South, a barangay in Navotas, Northern Manila District
- Bagumbayan, a barangay in Angono, Rizal
- Bagumbayan, a barangay in Bulakan, Bulacan
- Bagumbayan, a barangay in Cataingan, Masbate
- Bagumbayan, a barangay in Kabuntalan, Maguindanao del Norte
- Bagumbayan, a barangay in Llanera, Nueva Ecija
- Bagumbayan, a barangay in Marogong, Lanao del Sur
- Bagumbayan, a barangay in Malalag, Davao del Sur
- Bagumbayan, a barangay in Masbate City
- Bagumbayan, a barangay in Pandan, Antique
- Bagumbayan, a barangay in President Quirino, Sultan Kudarat
- Bagumbayan, a barangay in Sergio Osmeña, Zamboanga del Norte
- Bagumbayan, a barangay in Teresa, Rizal

== Other ==
- Bagumbayan–Volunteers for a New Philippines (Bagumbayan-VNP), a political party in the Philippines
