= Bagumbayan, Taguig =

Barangay in Taguig, Metro Manila, Philippines

Bagumbayan
- Barangay
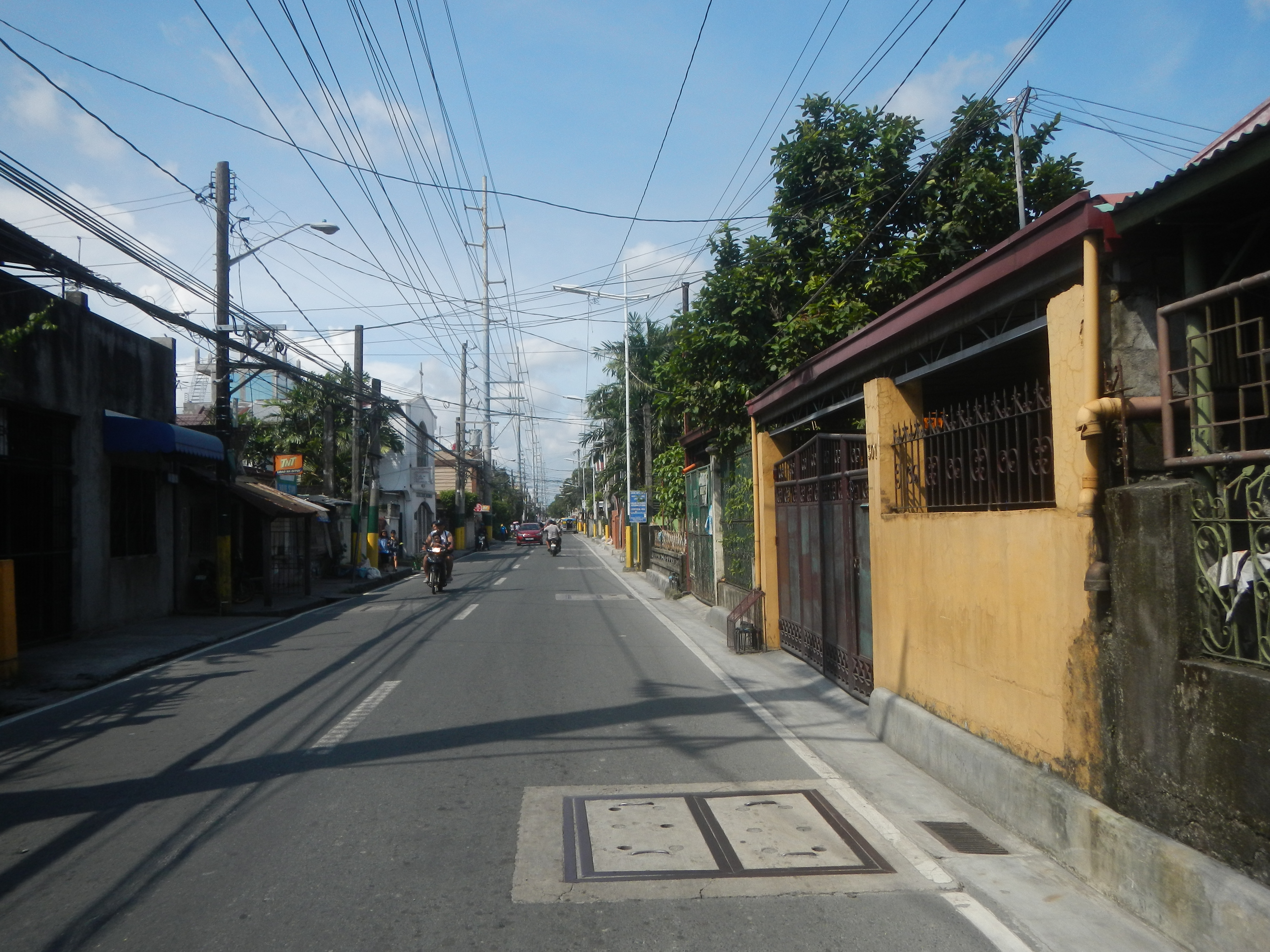
- A street in the barangay

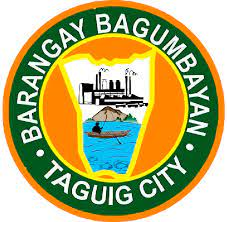
- Seal
- Interactive map of Bagumbayan
- Location within Metro Manila
- Coordinates: 14°28′27.74″N 121°3′24.75″E
- Country: Philippines
- Region: National Capital Region
- City: Taguig
- District: 1st Legislative district of Taguig

Government
  - Type: Barangay
  - Punong Barangay: Rovina Jane Santos
  - Barangay Councilor: Jessie Concepcion; Alexander Aquino; Ma. Rowena Blanco; Ejay Javier; Arnold Caldozo; Ma. Luisa Cartel; John Elmer Pagsisihan
  - Sangguniang Kabataan Chairperson: Ava Cassandra Victoria

Population (2024)
  - Total: 55,160
- Time zone: UTC+8 (PST)
- Postal Code: 1631
- Area code: 02
- Range: Marikina Valley Fault Ridge
- Website: https://www.facebook.com/BrgyBagumbayanOfficialPage

Bagumbayan is one of the 38 barangays of Taguig, Philippines. It is also one of the nine original Barrio of Taguig.

== Etymology ==
The barangay acquired its original name, Bagong Bayan, which means "new town" in Tagalog, upon its establishment. It was later shortened to its present name, Bagumbayan.

== History ==
During the Spanish Colonial Era, what is now Bagumbayan was filled with forests. No one was brave enough to settle here except for the Tanyag and Garcia families, both of which came from the village of Tipas. Once they settled there, the Spanish Government established it as a barangay of Taguig. Because it was recently founded, it was named Bagong Bayan and later shortened to Bagumbayan. Its first lumang bayan (barangay head) was Cererina San Juan, and the primary jobs of the people then were fishing and farming. The next people to occupy the position of barangay head before the American Colonial Period were Tandoy Sta. Teresa, Lelay Sta. Teresa, and Cepruto Marcelo.

During the time of the Americans and the Japanese in the Philippines, Laureano Garcia became the barangay's head and was followed by Victor Padsisihan, Segundo Magundayao, Arturo Tanyag, Francisco Javier, and Nicanor Garcia. Though it was the latest town that was founded then, the citizens of Taguig trusted the following people to be its councilors: Elino Cruz, Benito Garcia, Cerilo P. Santos, Arsenio Javier, Jose Aquino, Francisco dela Rosa, Francisco Tortosa, Claudio Marcelo and Rufino Dacumos.

In 1958, the barangay was nicknamed "Sleeping Town" because the livelihood of its people advanced slowly. However, later in 1959, their livelihood was stimulated because the value of the land in the area that was normally exposed or used for agriculture suddenly increased. Because of this, the government ordered the construction of what was then called the South Superhighway, leading to an increase in land purchases by corporations. From there, Bagumbayan developed into the barangay it is now.

== Geography ==
Bagumbayan is bounded on the north by Lower Bicutan and Central Bicutan, to the east by Laguna de Bay, to the south by Bagumbayan River and Sucat in Muntinlupa, and on the west by the Philippine National Railways tracks and barangays North Daang Hari, Tanyag, and South Daang Hari.
