= Journey for Peace in EDSA =

Mural wall located in Quezon City, Philippines

- Lakbay Para sa Kapayapaan sa EDSA (Filipino)
- Part of the mural along Epifanio De los Santos Avenue
- Completion date: 27 July 2013
- Type: Mural
- Subject: Bayanihan concept
- Dimensions: 3770 m (12,370 ft)
- Condition: Demolished or Lost (Painted-over)
- Location: Quezon City

Journey for Peace in EDSA (Filipino: Lakbay Para sa Kapayapaan sa EDSA) was a wall mural in Quezon City. Inaugurated in 2013, the mural spanned lengths of Epifanio De los Santos Avenue (EDSA), White Plains Avenue, and Colonel Bonny Serrano Avenue, covering the walls of Camp Aguinaldo. Upon its completion it became the world's longest peace mural, measuring 3,770 meters, beating the 1,000-meter peace mural in Chile titled Wall of Peace, which was made in 2009 by 500 people.

== Conception ==
The Journey for Peace in EDSA mural was an initiative by the Armed Forces of the Philippines, Metropolitan Manila Development Authority, Office of the Presidential Adviser on the Peace Process, Asia America Initiative, and Dolphins Love Freedom Network. The painting of the mural was commenced on March 26, 2013 by more than 1,000 individuals who planned to complete a 4-kilometer mural. On July 27, 2013, the mural was inaugurated. In its completion, the mural measured 3,770 meters. The main theme of the mural was the concept of bayanihan as a vehicle for peace in the country.

Beginning in 2019, the portion of the mural facing Col. Bonny Serrano Ave. was demolished to give way to the road's widening, while the remaining portion facing EDSA was painted over.
