= Katipunan Avenue =

Major road in Quezon City, Philippines

Coordinates: 14°37′42″N 121°4′26″E

C-5 Katipunan Avenue
- Pres. Carlos P. Garcia Avenue
- A section of Katipunan Avenue southbound towards Aurora Boulevard and Marcos Highway, near the Ateneo de Manila University

Route information
- Maintained by Department of Public Works and Highways (Note: DPWH maintenance does not include the section of Katipunan Avenue south of Bonny Serrano Avenue.) and Metropolitan Manila Development Authority
- Component highways: C-5 C-5 from Bonny Serrano Avenue to Tandang Sora Avenue; N11 from Bonny Serrano Avenue to Carlos P. Garcia Avenue; N129 from Carlos P. Garcia Avenue to Tandang Sora Avenue

Major junctions
- From: N129 (Tandang Sora Avenue) / Magsaysay Avenue
- Carlos P. Garcia Avenue; N59 (Aurora Boulevard & Marcos Highway); P. Tuazon Boulevard; N185 / N11 (Bonny Serrano Avenue)
- To: White Plains Avenue / Temple Drive

Location
- Country: Philippines
- Major cities: Quezon City

Highway system
- Roads in the Philippines; Highways; Expressways; List

Katipunan Avenue (Filipino: Abenida Katipunan) is a major avenue in Quezon City, Metro Manila, Philippines. It runs north–south from the University of the Philippines Diliman, intersecting with Tandang Sora Avenue at its northernmost point, down to the Manila Philippines Temple of the Church of Jesus Christ of Latter-day Saints, intersecting with White Plains Avenue at its southernmost point.

The road is a component of both National Route 11 (N11) and National Route 129 (N129) of the Philippine highway network and Circumferential Road 5 (C-5) of Manila's arterial road network.

The avenue is mostly three lanes per direction, widening to four in select areas and narrowing to two lanes within Barangays White Plains and Saint Ignatius.

An extension project, shelved by the government for the last six decades due to failed negotiations with private entities, has been revived by the Department of Public Works and Highways to address worsening traffic situations along Katipunan and Commonwealth Avenue, as well as Batasan–San Mateo Road. As of February 2021, the project is 70% complete.

== Etymology ==
The avenue is named after the Katipunan revolution as the area now occupied by the road was originally carved as a passageway for Katipunan revolutionaries to make their way to Banlat (now Tandang Sora), Balintawak, and Pugad Lawin, all then parts of Caloocan, during the Philippine Revolution against the Spanish colonial government in 1898.

It was historically known since its planning stages as Katipunan Parkway.

== Buildings ==
Along Katipunan Avenue are several higher educational facilities, including the Ateneo de Manila University, Miriam College, and the University of the Philippines Diliman. It is also the location of the Manila Water facilities within the Balara Filters Park. The area along Katipunan Avenue was originally intended as a low-density residential zone. Due to the populous universities along the avenue, numerous condominiums have since been established. In 2009, the SM Investments Group proposed to build a 31-story high-rise residential project called Stanford Residences on a 35,600 square metres (383,000 sq ft) site on Katipunan Avenue near the Santa Maria della Strada Parish Church, totalling over 1,316 residential and commercial units. To build this, SM would have to get an exemption from the Comprehensive Zoning Ordinance (Ordinance No. SP 918 S-2000), restricting the height of buildings in residential areas such as that part of Katipunan Avenue to 9 metres (30 ft). Residents opposed the exemption. SM already had another high-rise project in progress on the other side of Katipunan Avenue, called Berkeley Residences, which was already 40% done by September 2009. SM indicated it would be willing to move the Stanford Residences project to another location.

Despite advisories warning against alcohol beverage distribution near schools along Katipunan Avenue, bar establishments remain a popular aspect of the area's nightlife.

== Transport ==
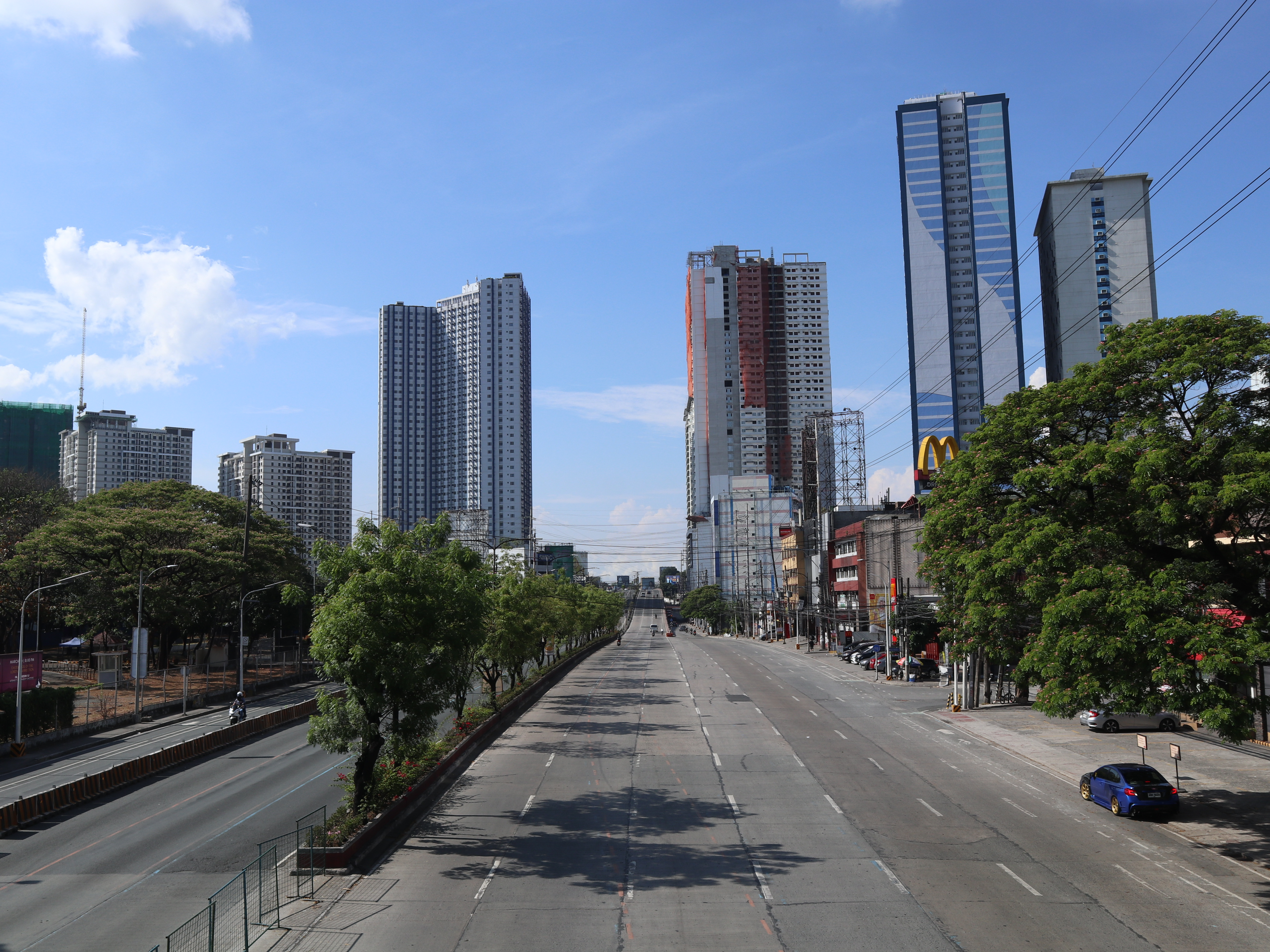
Katipunan Avenue looking south

Katipunan Avenue generally features heavy motorized vehicle traffic and is divided in the middle by traffic islands for the convenience of pedestrians. In 2005, the Metropolitan Manila Development Authority (MMDA) listed the area of Katipunan Avenue near Ateneo de Manila University as one of Metro Manila's 14 most dangerous traffic black spots. In 2008, the MMDA introduced a traffic rerouting plan on the avenue, cutting off some u-turn slots along the avenue; locals complained, but the MMDA responded that the road was used by many motorists and not just local residents and that the measures had improved traffic flow. Later, the MMDA stated they might re-open some of the u-turn slots. In 2010, the MMDA announced that it would deploy 2,000 traffic enforcers along the avenue to deal with the heavy vehicular traffic. In 2006, the city government built a pedestrian overpass near Ateneo de Manila University.

Motorized tricycles have long been officially banned from Katipunan Avenue, but the ban was not always evenly enforced until an announcement in August 2008 by the MMDA. MMDA stated that they would enforce the ban from Aurora Boulevard northwards. In September 2008, Quezon City councilor Allan Butch Francisco proposed an exception to the ban. He stated that the Quezon City Tricycle Ordinance of 1992 permitted tricycles to travel along national highways if those highways were the only access roads in the area and that Katipunan Avenue was the only road linking to the U-turn slot on C.P. Garcia Avenue. Katipunan tricycle drivers held a strike in mid-September in protest.

Katipunan Station is located on Aurora Boulevard near its intersection with Katipunan Avenue. It is the only underground station on Line 2 and the whole LRTA system.

== Landscape ==
In 2002, the Katipunan Greening Project volunteers planted Bougainvillea, Lantana camara, petunias, red creepers, and other flowering shrubs along the avenue after two years of lobbying the MMDA to ensure that the city would water and otherwise look after the plants. Businesses along the avenue also lent a hand. In 2003, the MMDA proposed removing the trees and the traffic islands along the avenue to improve the traffic flow; however, local residents objected. The tree-cutting was halted by an order from Malacañang, pending the return of then-President of the Philippines Gloria Macapagal Arroyo from an overseas trip. Again, in 2009, the MMDA was cutting down trees along the avenue for a road widening project; in the second case, the Department of Environment and Natural Resources (DENR) ordered the MMDA to stop after protests by the Ateneo de Manila University. There were further back-and-forth accusations between the two departments, with the MMDA stating that the tree removal had already been agreed to with the DENR, while the DENR criticized the MMDA's sloppy work in removing the trees.

== Incidents ==
=== Crime ===
In 1996, retired Colonel Rolando Abadilla of the Philippine Constabulary (now Philippine National Police) Metropolitan Command Intelligence and Security Group was killed by four gunmen, including a fellow police officer, while driving along Katipunan Avenue in broad daylight. In 2002, a police officer was stabbed by the boyfriend of a girl whom he and his cousin had admitted harassing in a nightclub earlier that evening. An armed robber stole valuables from all the patrons of a restaurant there in September 2006. In June 2007, police and carjackers suspected to be planning a bank robbery had a pre-dawn gunbattle along the avenue, leaving three of the alleged criminals dead. In August 2007, three jeepney touts who worked along the avenue were arrested by police; their bodies were later dumped along the avenue, showing signs of torture. The incident led to a probe by the Philippines' Commission on Human Rights.

=== Traffic accidents ===
In November 2007, a truck hit a motorcycle while travelling south, precipitating a chain of collisions, which ended with the truck slamming into a coffee shop. Five people were injured, and six or seven vehicles were damaged. In 2008, there was a fatal accident along the avenue caused by a man driving under the influence of alcohol. The car in question had vehicle registration plates marking it as belonging to the National Prosecutor's League. Two teenagers from the Balara area were killed.

== Intersections ==
The entire route is located in Quezon City.

km	mi	Destinations	Notes
		White Plains Avenue	Southern terminus. Continues south as Temple Drive
		Derby Street	White Plains Subdivision. Gated access.
		Sarangaya Avenue	White Plains Subdivision. Gated access.
		Roseville Street	White Plains Subdivision. Restricted access.
		Pinesville Street	White Plains Subdivision. Gated access.
		1st Street	Saint Ignatius Village. Gated access.
11.975	7.441	N185 / N11 (Bonny Serrano Avenue)	Traffic light intersection. Southern end of C-5 and N11 designations. South end of DPWH maintenance
		Rajah Matanda Street	Northbound segment part of Blue Ridge A Subdivision. Both segments are along the service road and accessible via U-turn slots.
		North end of Libis Tunnel	
		Sunriser's Street	Southbound only.
		Highland Drive	Northbound only. Blue Ridge A Subdivision. Restricted access.
		Tomas P. Castro Street	Southbound only. Historically a continuation of Highland Drive, was renamed in 1989.
		Cliff Drive	Northbound only. Blue Ridge A Subdivision. Gated access.
		P. Tuazon Boulevard, Major Santos Dizon Street	No left turns. Right-in/right-out for northbound intersection. Access to Cubao (southbound) & Marikina (northbound).
		South end of Katipunan Flyover	
		N59 (Aurora Boulevard, Marcos Highway)	Traffic light intersection. Access to Cubao, San Juan, Manila, Marikina & Antipolo.
		Esteban Abada Street	Southbound service road only.
		Xavierville Avenue	Southbound service road only. Access to Project 2 and Kamias Road.
		Grade School Lane	Northbound service road only. Gated access to Ateneo de Manila University.
		Father Masterson Drive	Northbound service road only. Gated access to Ateneo de Manila University.
		North end of Katipunan Flyover	
		Rosa Alvero Street	Southbound only.
		F. Dela Rosa Street/University Road	Traffic light intersection. Right-in/right-out for northbound intersection. Gated access to Ateneo de Manila University.
		Park 9 Alley	Southbound only.
		B. Gonzales Street/Thornton Drive	Traffic light intersection. Gated access to Miriam College.
		J. Escaler Street	Southbound only. Loops back to Katipunan Avenue.
		Mangyan Street	Northbound only. La Vista Village. Gated access.
		Pansol Avenue (Katipunan Avenue Extension)	Access to Marikina via Tumana Bridge
13.944– 15.1060	8.664– 9.3864	Carlos P. Garcia Avenue	Traffic light intersection. Access to Teachers' Village, Krus na Ligas, UP Village, and University of the Philippines Diliman. Route number changes from N11 to N129.
		Quirino Street	Southbound only. Gated access to University of the Philippines.
		Montalban Street	Northbound only. Accessible to pedicabs and pedestrians only.
		Shuster Street	Southbound only. Gated access to University of the Philippines.
		H. Ventura Street	Northbound only. Access to Marikina via Tumana Bridge and future access to Batasan–San Mateo Road via Katipunan Avenue Extension.
15.743	9.782	Magsaysay Avenue	Gated access to University of the Philippines. Southern terminus. Road continues north as N129 (Tandang Sora Avenue).
1.000 mi = 1.609 km; 1.000 km = 0.621 mi: Closed/former; Concurrency terminus; Incomplete access; Route transition

== Landmarks ==
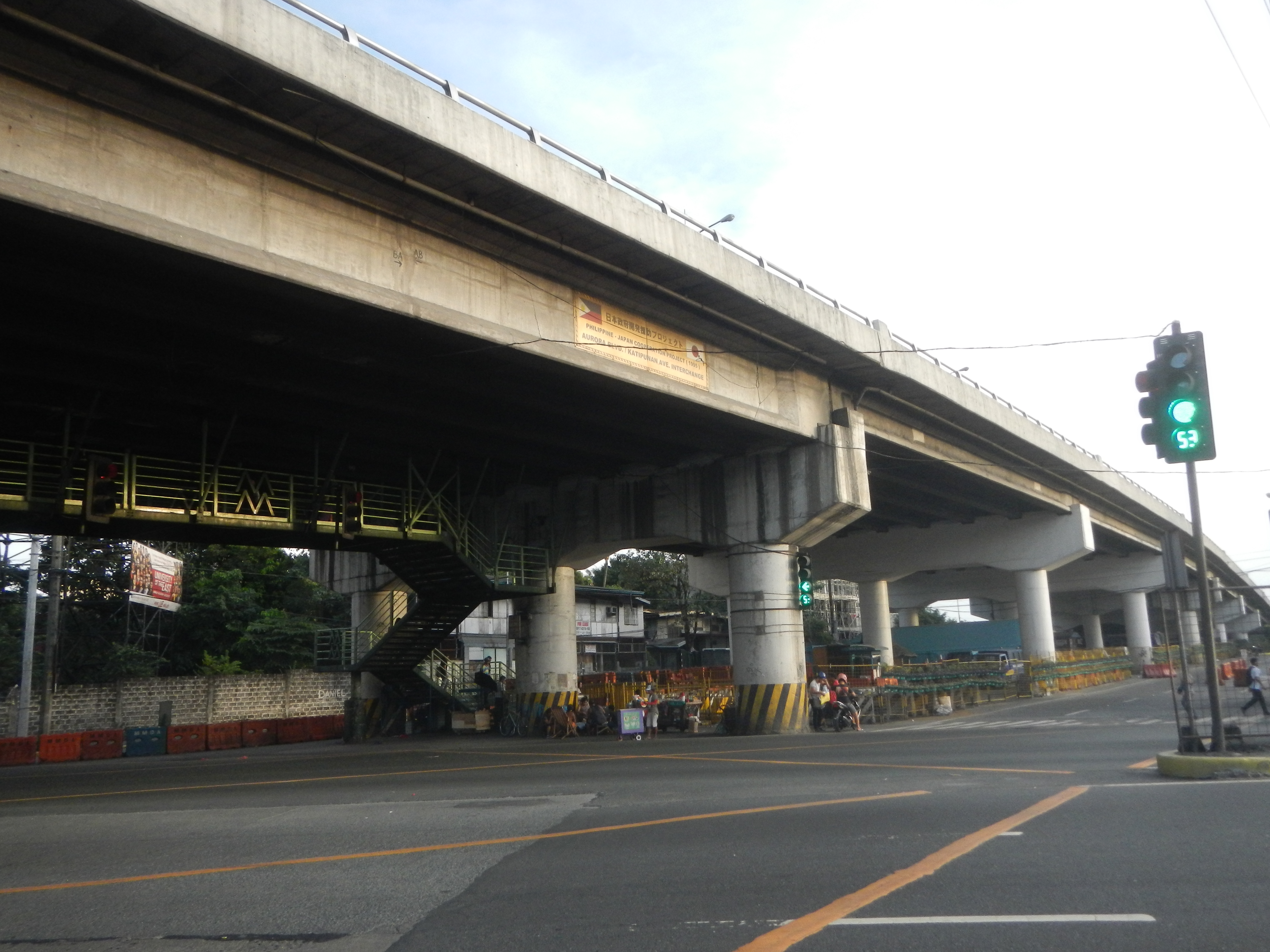
Aurora Boulevard–Katipunan Avenue Interchange

From White Plains Avenue in the south to Magsaysay Avenue in the north, all in Quezon City:

- Manila Philippines Temple
- Quirino Memorial Medical Center
- Philippine School of Business Administration
- Katipunan station
- Ateneo de Manila University
  - Blue Eagle Gym
  - Moro Lorenzo Football Field
  - Ateneo Art Gallery
- Miriam College
- University of the Philippines Diliman
  - University of the Philippines Integrated School
- U.P. Town Center
- Local Water Utilities Administration/Metropolitan Waterworks and Sewerage System
