= 2003 Quezon City elephant escape incident =

Animal escape in Quezon City, Philippines

The 2003 Quezon City elephant escape incident occurred on May 8, 2003, where Jumbo, a captive performing elephant, escaped into the streets of Kamuning in Quezon City, Metro Manila, Philippines.

== Background ==
Elephant World was a two-year show by Uniprom Inc., a Thai company which sent performing elephants around the world. For the Philippine leg of the tour, the company brought over 10 elephants and housed them in a compound near Araneta Center (now Araneta City) dubbed Elephant Arena where they are to perform.

== Escape ==
On the morning of May 8, 2003, Jumbo, a 21-year old, 8 foot tall Asian elephant, biggest of the 10, escaped its confines when a trainer allegedly left the visitor entrance gates open after the taping of the GMA network morning show Sis.

Upon the elephant's escape, it had injured two trainers who were trying to stop it. Other handlers were unable to restrain the animal, which led it to walk some 3 kilometers passing by Ramon Magsaysay High School, onto EDSA traffic, finally ending in Tomas Morato Avenue where it took rest. A truck was used to block the animal from progressing further into the street.

The sight of the elephant seemingly touring the streets attracted the attention of a crowd of onlookers that gathered around it. Handlers chained Jumbo to a tree and fed it bananas. A resident later doused the elephant with water to keep it cool. The elephant did not show signs of distress and was able to perform a few tricks entertaining the crowd. A veterinarian eventually tranquilized Jumbo.

The MMDA brought a crane and a truck to bring the sedated animal back to its enclosure, however, upon raising the animal to load it on the truck, they dropped Jumbo on his back, damaging a nearby taxi.

== Aftermath ==
An investigation was launched regarding the circumstances of the escape and whether or not the company incurred violations or sanctions in bringing "wildlife threats" in the country. A team composed of wildlife experts and veterinarians was mobilized to assess the living conditions of the elephants and determine if they were maltreated.

The incident caused major traffic and blockages in the notoriously busy city center which led to the rerouting of several motorists.

It was erroneously reported that one of the trainers was critically injured due to the animal stepping on his ribcage. It was later revealed that both trainers sustained only minor injuries and were treated in nearby Quirino Memorial Medical Center. Jumbo on the other hand was reported to not have sustained any damage from the fall and performed after a few days.

Theories on why the elephant took a stroll dominated local news cycles for a few days.

The incident also prompted controversy when a trainer spat on actor and known elephant lover Mark Gil's face as he rushed to get near Jumbo.
