= Circumferential Road 5 =

Major road in Metro Manila, Philippines

C-5 Circumferential Road 5
- C-5 Road
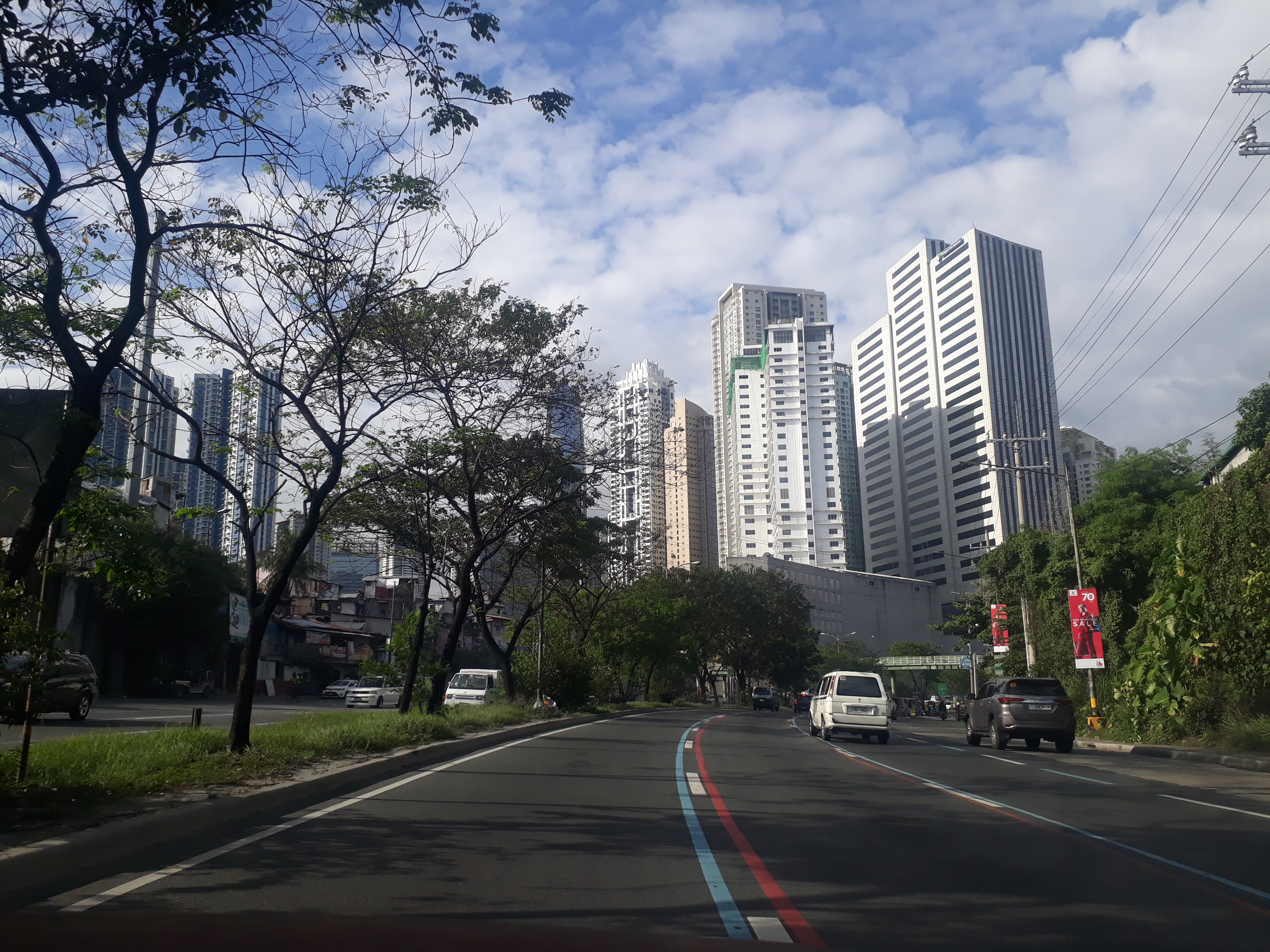
- C-5 Road in Taguig, with Bonifacio Global City in the background

Route information
- Maintained by the Department of Public Works and Highways, (Note: The DPWH maintains the non-expressway and main section of C-5 from Valenzuela to Taguig only.) the Metropolitan Manila Development Authority, and Metro Pacific Tollways Corporation (Note: MPTC maintains the expressway sections of C-5.)
- Length: 43.87 km (27.26 mi)
- Existed: 1994–present
- Component highways: N11 from Taguig to Quezon City; N141 in Pasig; N129 in Quezon City; N128 in Quezon City and Valenzuela; E5 in Valenzuela, Taguig, Pasay, Parañaque and Las Piñas

Major junctions
- Beltway around Manila
- North end: N1 (MacArthur Highway) in Valenzuela
- South end: E3 (Manila–Cavite Expressway) in Las Piñas

Location
- Country: Philippines
- Regions: Metro Manila
- Major cities: Las Piñas, Parañaque, Pasay, Pasig, Quezon City, Taguig, and Valenzuela

Highway system
- Roads in the Philippines; Highways; Expressways; List

Circumferential Road 5 (C-5), informally known as the C-5 Road, is a network of roads and bridges which comprise the fifth beltway of Metro Manila in the Philippines. Spanning some 43.87 kilometers (27.26 mi), it connects the cities of Las Piñas, Parañaque, Pasay, Pasig, Quezon City, Taguig, and Valenzuela.

It runs parallel to the four other beltways around Metro Manila and is also known for being the second most important transportation corridor after Circumferential Road 4.

Originally planned to run from Navotas in the north, the route remains incomplete because of right of way controversies, but portions of the route are already open for public use. On July 23, 2019, the two segments of the route were connected with the completion of the CAVITEX C-5 Link through a 2.2-kilometer (1.4 mi) flyover.

It is also known as Metro Manila's deadliest highway route, having 31 fatalities in 2019, 27 in 2018, and 23 in 2017. This is due to trucks and motorcycles along the narrow highway, as well as its road conditions.

== Route description ==
C-5 lies parallel to other circumferential roads around Metro Manila, most notably EDSA of C-4. It passes through the cities of Valenzuela, Quezon City, Pasig, Taguig, Pasay, Parañaque, and Las Piñas, in addition to the Embo barangays that were part of Makati until their transfer to Taguig in 2023. The road is divided into several segments.

=== NLEX Harbor Link ===
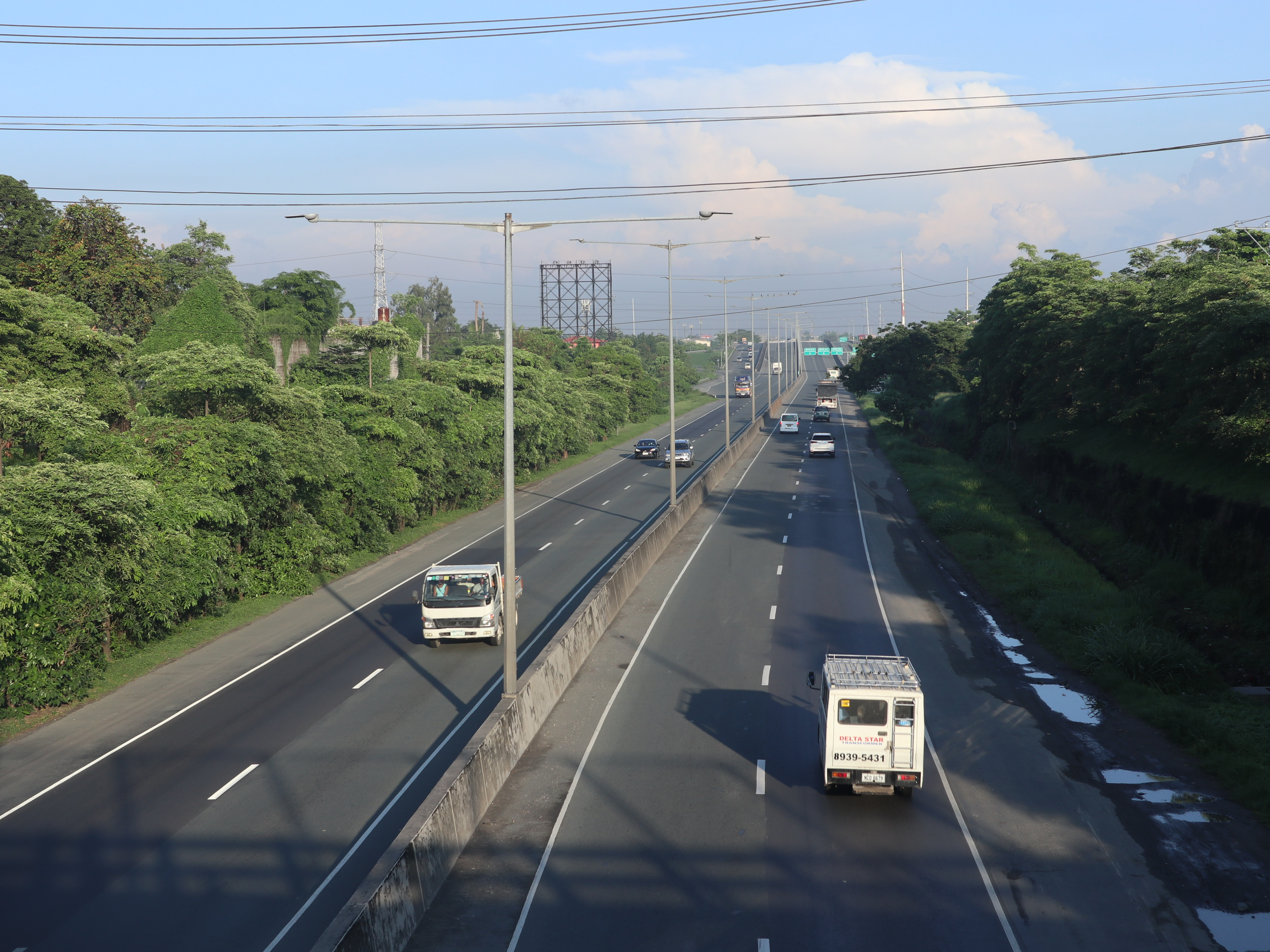
Segment 8.1 (Mindanao Avenue Link) of the NLEX looking west towards Harbor Link Interchange

From MacArthur Highway in Karuhatan, Valenzuela to Harbor Link Interchange, a cloverleaf interchange with the main line of the North Luzon Expressway (NLEX), C-5 is a toll road known as NLEX Karuhatan Link or NLEX Segment 9. Measuring 2.4-kilometer (1.5 mi) long, it is also the first segment of the NLEX Harbor Link project, which connects the NLEX with the Port of Manila.

From the Harbor Link Interchange to a 3-way signalized junction with Mindanao Avenue, C-5 is known as NLEX–Mindanao Avenue Link or NLEX Segment 8.1. The entire 2.7-kilometer (1.7 mi) toll road is also designated as a part of C-5 Road.

=== Mindanao Avenue ===
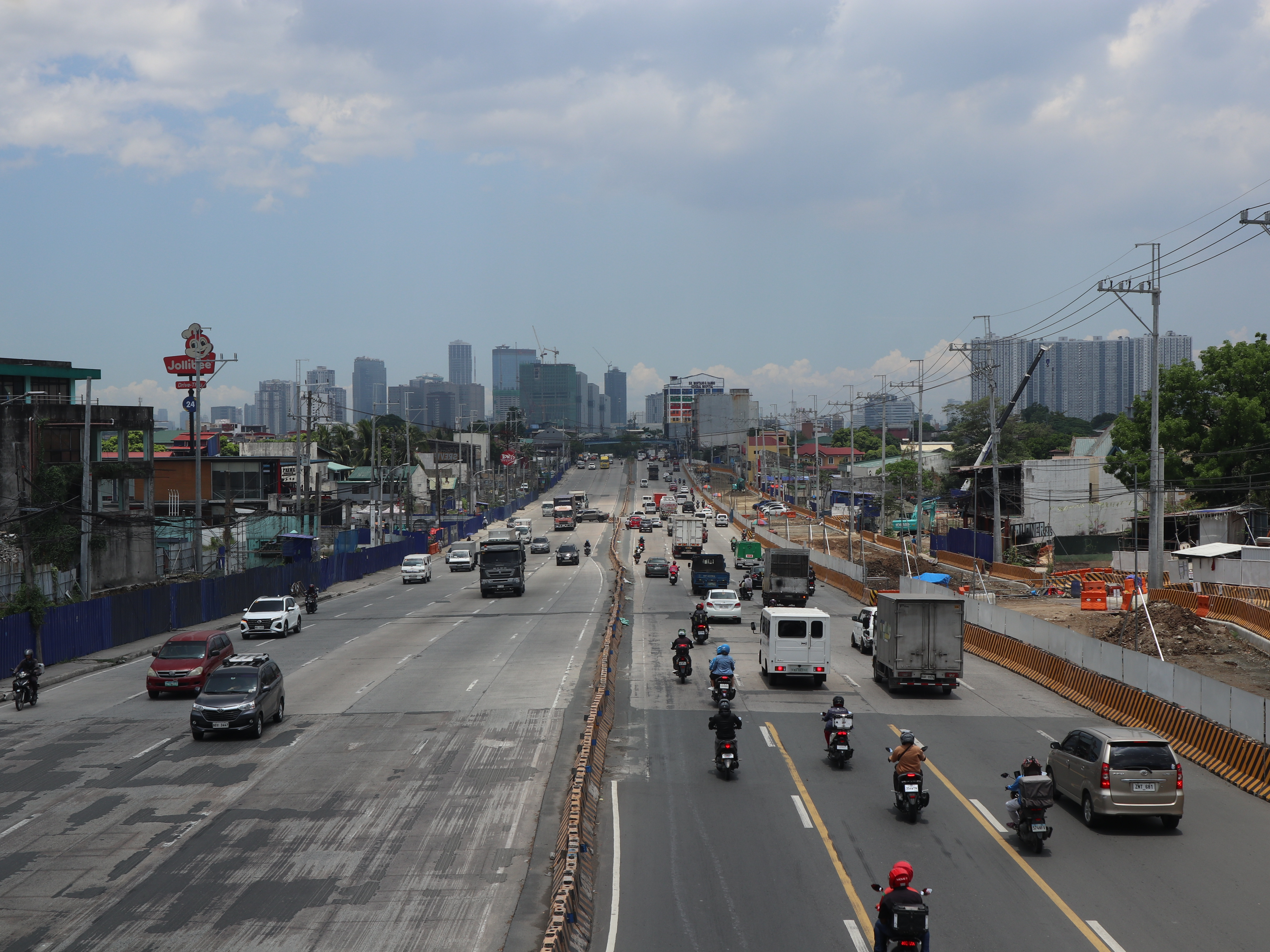
Mindanao Avenue in Tandang Sora, Quezon City

At the eastern end of NLEX Segment 8.1, C-5 turns southeast and becomes Mindanao Avenue. It is a 10-lane divided carriageway that serves as the main transportation corridor of Barangays Talipapa and Tandang Sora in Quezon City. The 3.5 kilometers (2.2 mi) portion of this 6.7-kilometer (4.2 mi) road from NLEX Segment 8.1 to Congressional Avenue is designated as a portion of C-5.

=== Congressional Avenue ===
At the signaled junction with Mindanao Avenue, C-5 turns northeast as Congressional Avenue, a six-lane divided carriageway that serves as the main east-to-west transportation corridor of Barangays Bahay Toro, Culiat, Pasong Tamo, and Tandang Sora in Quezon City. It continues east for 3.9 kilometers (2.4 mi) up to its eastern terminus at Luzon Avenue.

=== Luzon Avenue ===
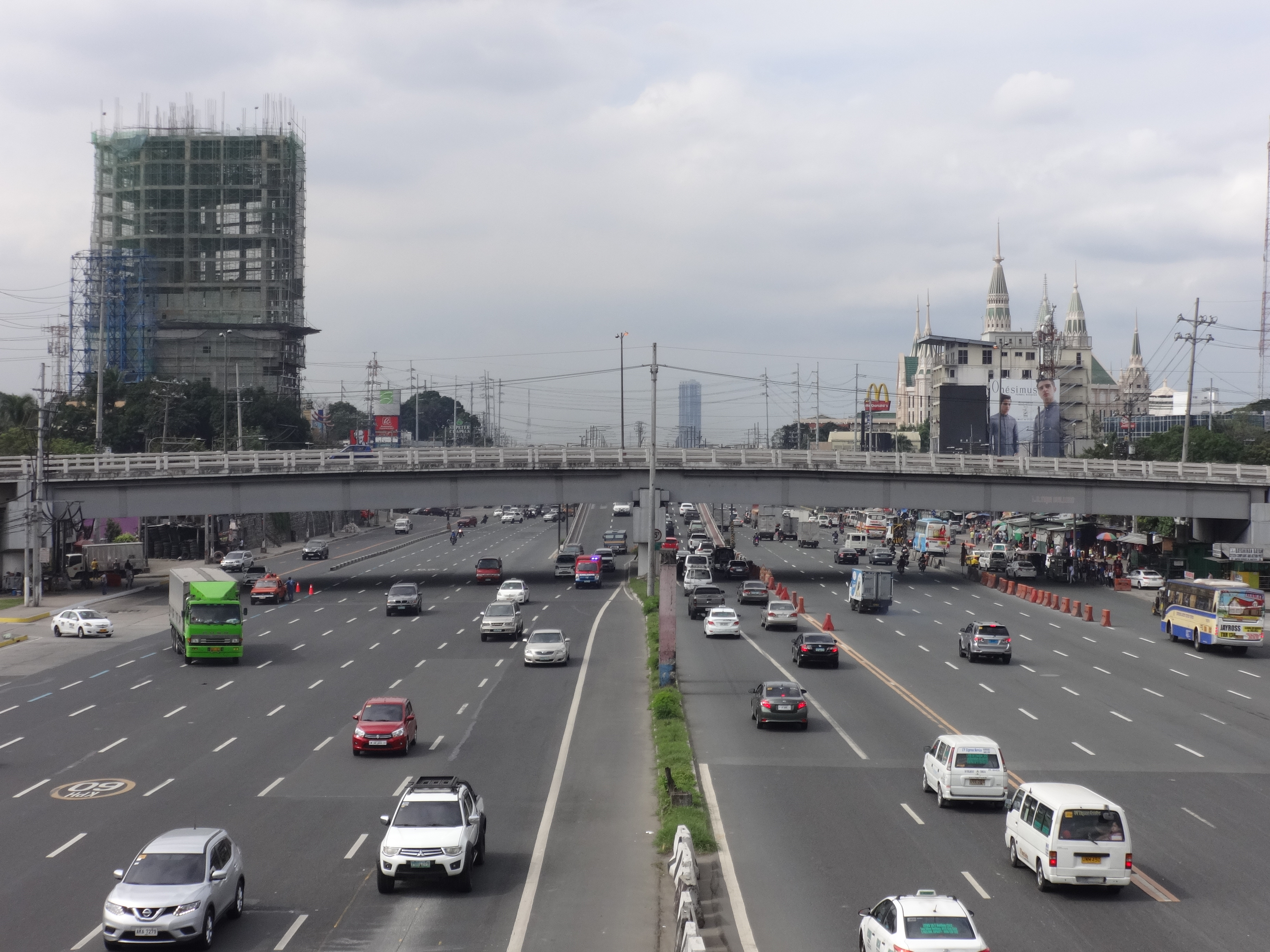
Luzon Avenue Flyover

At the end of Congressional Avenue Extension, C-5 turns south as Luzon Avenue, a 4-lane divided city road between Barangays Culiat and Matandang Balara in Quezon City, for 850 meters (2,790 ft) up to Commonwealth Avenue. The 6-lane Luzon Avenue Flyover carries C-5 across Commonwealth Avenue to connect it with Tandang Sora Avenue.

=== Tandang Sora Avenue ===
Southeast of Commonwealth Avenue, C-5 is known as Tandang Sora Avenue. It runs for 1 kilometer (0.62 mi) from Barangay Matandang Balara, going around the University of the Philippines Diliman campus, up to the junction with Magsaysay Avenue.

The original planned route of C-5 included the entire 9.6-kilometer (6.0 mi) road; however, due to the road's incapacity to carry a large amount of vehicular traffic, only the 1-kilometer (0.62 mi) portion from the Luzon Avenue Flyover to Magsaysay Avenue was designated as a portion of C-5 Road. Furthermore, Tandang Sora Avenue becomes a six-lane divided carriageway shortly after crossing Capitol Hills Drive, 350 meters (1,150 ft) south of the flyover.

=== Katipunan Avenue ===
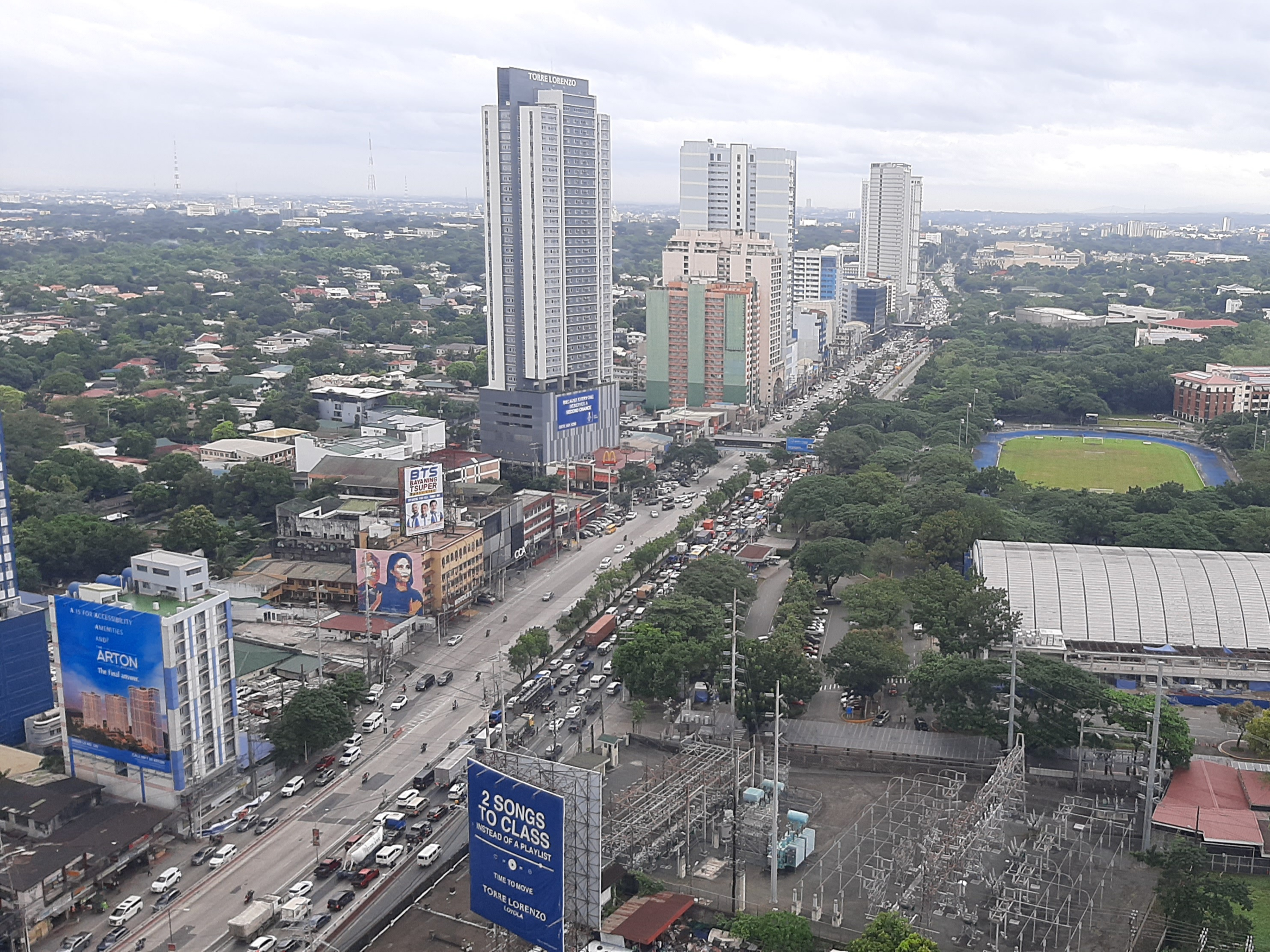
Katipunan Avenue in Barangay Loyola Heights, Quezon City

After crossing Magsaysay Avenue, C-5 turns south and becomes Katipunan Avenue, a ten-lane divided carriageway that serves as the main transportation corridor of Matandang Balara, Pansol, Loyola Heights, and Project 4 in Quezon City. It heads south for 4.8 kilometers (3.0 mi) until its junction with Bonny Serrano Avenue. Shortly before crossing Bonny Serrano Avenue, a 4-lane divided underpass descends from Katipunan Avenue, traverses underneath Col. Bonny Serrano Avenue, and ascends into Libis Flyover, which immediately connects it to E. Rodriguez Jr. Avenue.

=== Colonel Bonny Serrano Avenue ===
C-5 passes through a section of Colonel Bonny Serrano Avenue, a four-lane undivided avenue, as a connecting corridor 500 meters (1,600 ft) from Katipunan Avenue to Eulogio Rodriguez Jr. Avenue. The Libis Tunnel and Libis Flyover traverse between the avenue's westbound and eastbound lanes.

=== Eulogio S. Rodriguez Jr. Avenue ===
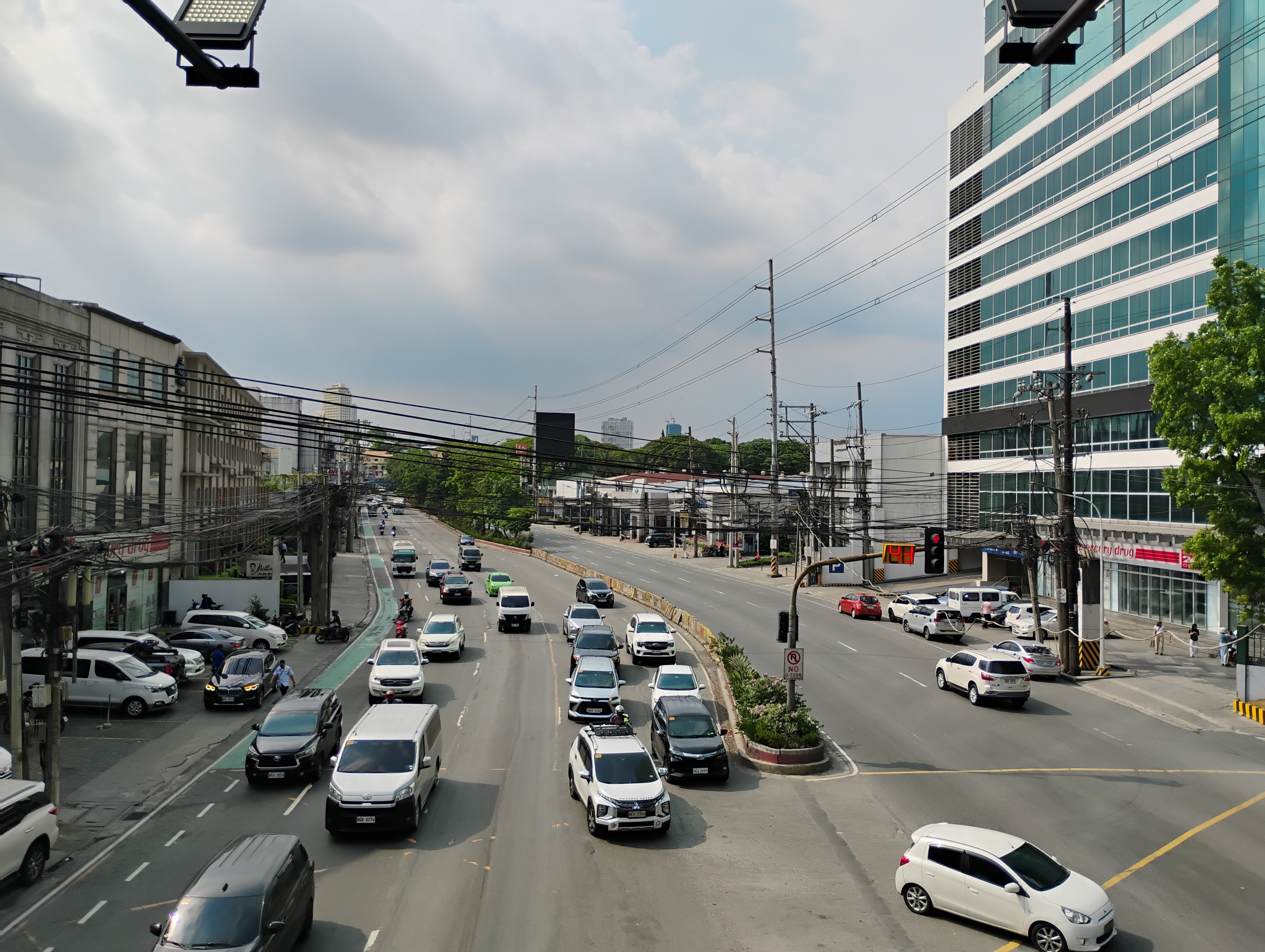
Eulogio S. Rodriguez Jr. Avenue near Eastwood City

At its junction with Bonny Serrano Avenue and FVR Road at the Libis Tunnel and Libis Flyover, C-5 then turns south as Eulogio S. Rodriguez Jr. Avenue, a 6.7-kilometer (4.2 mi), 10-lane divided road that serves as the main thoroughfare between Quezon City and Pasig. The road ends at a junction with Pasig Boulevard and continues onto C.P. Garcia Bridge, which crosses the Pasig River and eventually becomes Carlos P. Garcia Avenue shortly afterwards. The avenue is named after Eulogio Rodriguez Jr., a former representative and governor of Rizal.

=== Carlos P. Garcia Avenue ===
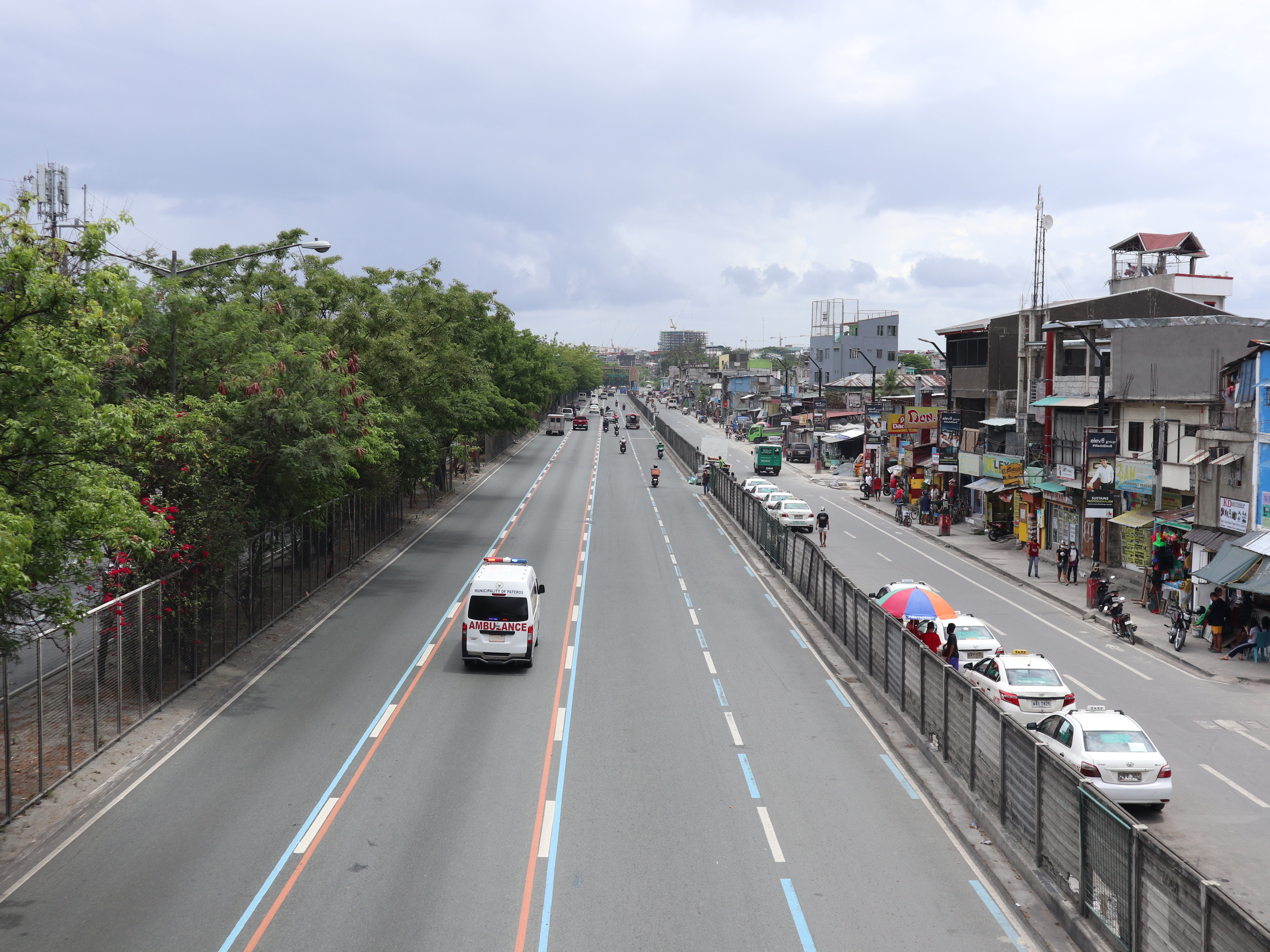
Carlos P. Garcia Avenue southbound in Taguig

Past the C.P. Garcia Bridge over the Pasig River, C-5 becomes Carlos P. Garcia Avenue. It is a 7.5 km (4.7 mi), fourteen-lane divided road that serves as the main thoroughfare in western Taguig. It passes through a small portion of Embo (formerly part of Makati) and continuously passes Taguig, where it bypasses Bonifacio Global City and meets the exit ramps to the CAVITEX–C-5 Link and the South Luzon Expressway before ending at the intersection with East Service Road.

It is not to be mistaken with the legal name of the C-5 route.

=== CAVITEX-C5 Southlink Expressway ===
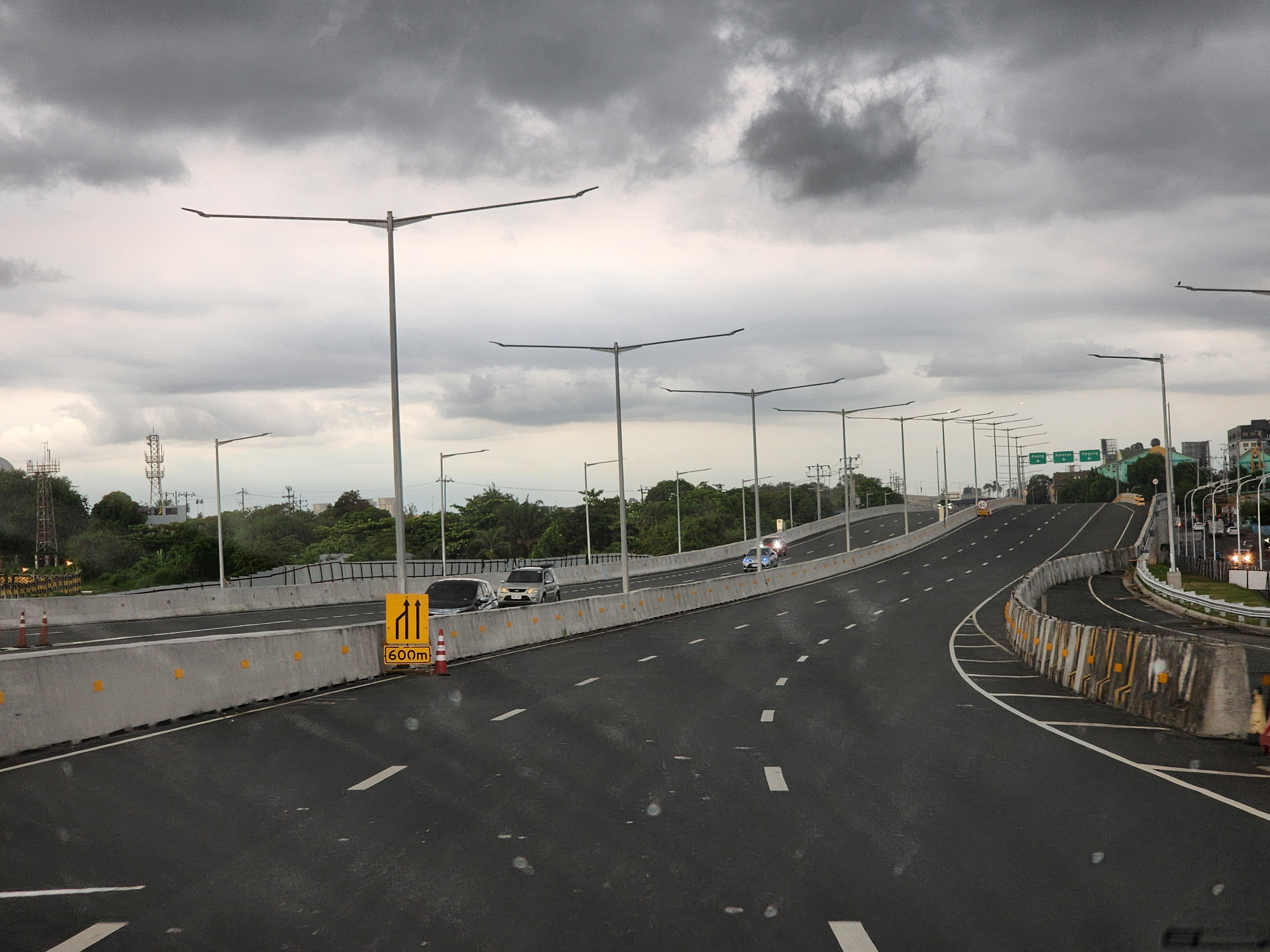
C5 Southlink Expressway in Merville

The CAVITEX–C-5 Southlink Expressway starts at Carlos P. Garcia Avenue (C-5) in Taguig near its interchange with the South Luzon Expressway (SLEX). It then ascends as the existing flyover that crosses Skyway, the PNR Metro Commuter Line, SLEX and the at-grade expressway's service roads before descending along C-5 Extension, which serves as its frontage roads, in Pasay. It then continues its course south of Ninoy Aquino International Airport until it meets its current terminus at C-5 Road Extension in Parañaque, near Moonwalk and a Shell station. The expressway's section towards the Manila–Cavite Expressway (CAVITEX) is fully operational with Segment 3B opened on March 30, 2026. It will continue its course south of the airport. It will then pass by the Global Airport Business Park and Amvel City, where it connects to another partially operational segment starting at an interchange towards Dr. Santos Avenue plus toll plaza located past the interchange. A flyover crosses Dr. Santos, the LRT-1 Cavite Extension, and Diego Cera Avenue. It ends at a trumpet interchange with CAVITEX near the latter's Parañaque toll plaza at the border between Parañaque and Las Piñas

=== C-5 Road Extension ===
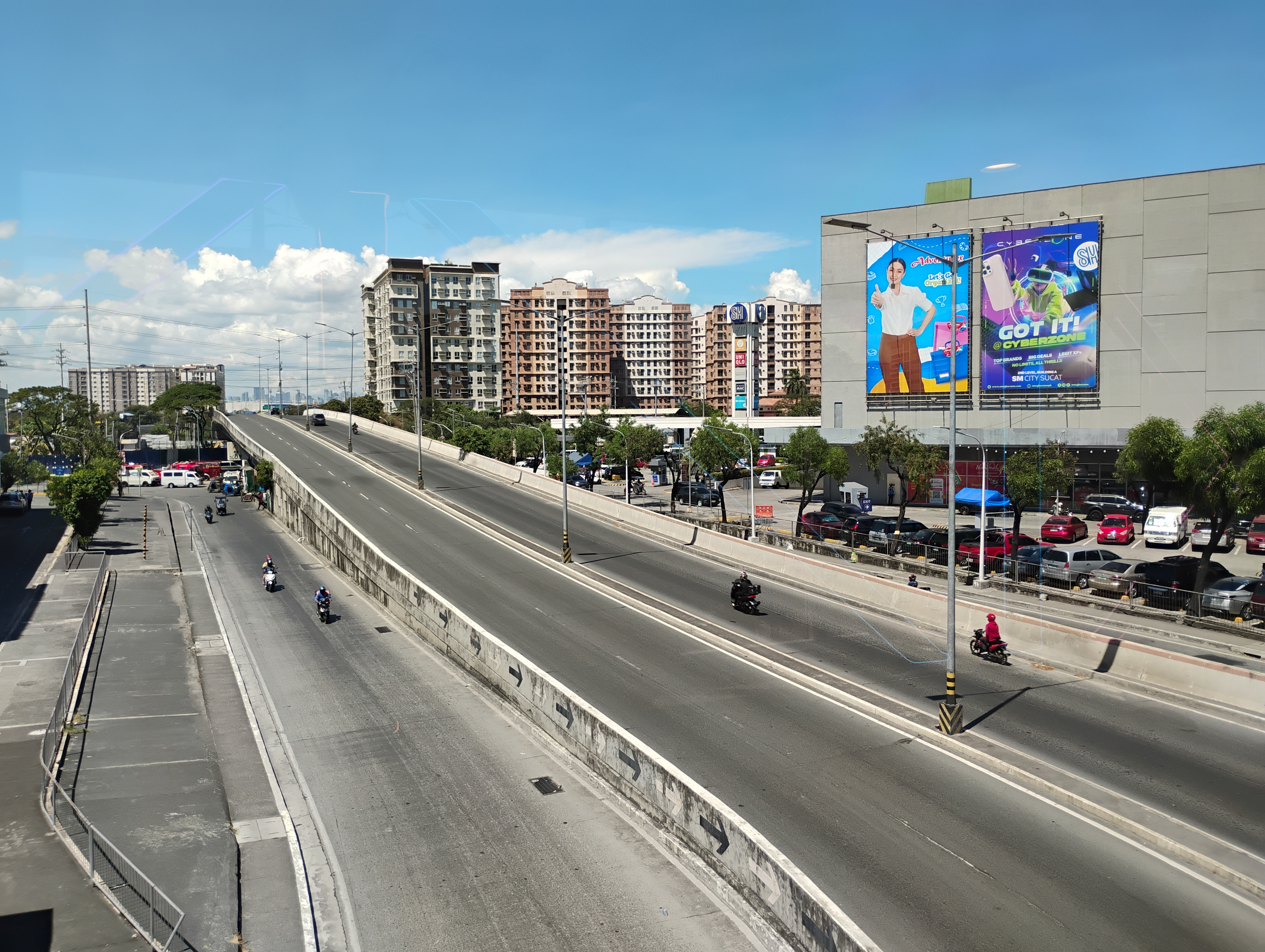
C-5 Extension near SM City Sucat, Parañaque

Across the South Luzon Expressway, C-5 continues as C-5 Road Extension from West Service Road near Merville Exit of SLEX in Pasay. It also serves as the two frontage roads of CAVITEX–C-5 Link's section in Pasay. It traverses along the southern perimeter fence of the Ninoy Aquino International Airport, where westbound and eastbound traffic split into separate frontage roads between the West Service Road and Radar Technical Village in Pasay. Its segment from the West Service Road to the vicinity of Neil Armstrong Avenue, which leads to Moonwalk, Parañaque, is alternatively known as Moonwalk Access Road. It then enters Parañaque and curves around Amvel City, crosses Dr. A. Santos Avenue and Diego Cera Avenue, and ends at the Manila–Cavite Expressway (CAVITEX) in Las Piñas. The future LRT Line 1 Extension will run along most of the Las Piñas segment of C-5 Road Extension.

== Location on the West Valley Fault ==
Studies conducted by the PHIVOLCS revealed that a large portion of C-5 is built on top of the West Valley Fault. A map of the fault line released on May 18, 2015, shows C-5 in Taguig beside the fault line. The C-5 road is prone to liquefaction.

== History ==
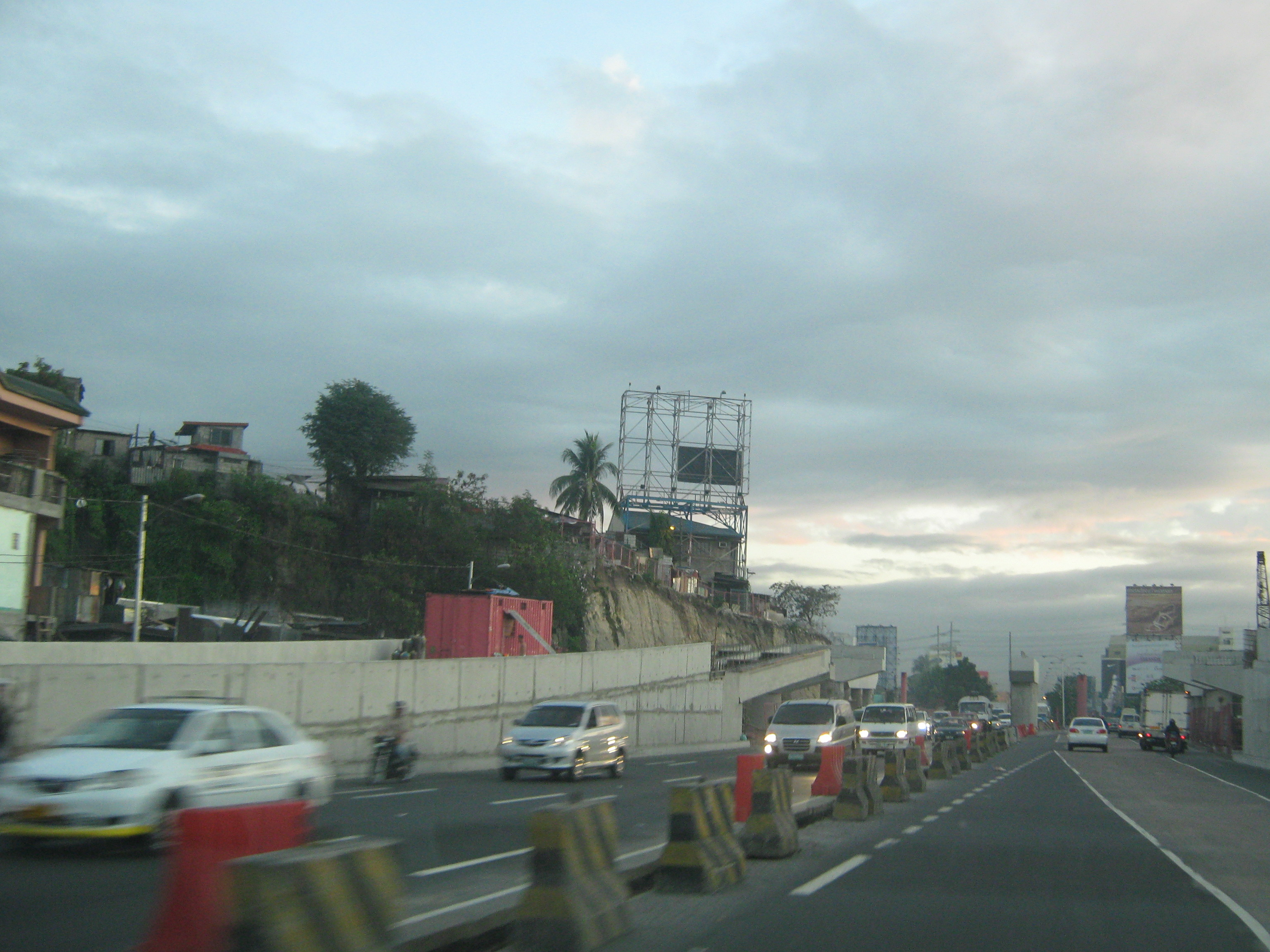
The unfinished northern section of the C-5 Kalayaan elevated U-turn slot in March 2009, about two months before its completion

The proposal for the Metro Manila Arterial Road System was made in the late 1960s. The proposal mentions building ten radial roads and six circumferential roads to support Metro Manila's growing vehicular population. Circumferential Road 5's original alignment was to begin at a proposed coastal road near Manila Bay in Navotas at the north and traverse around Manila up to Radial Road 1 (now comprises the Manila–Cavite Expressway) at the south. In the 1970s, its proposed southern alignment included a route through Bicutan and the area what is now the Better Living Subdivision in Parañaque. From 1978 to 1983, various feasibility studies by the Japan International Cooperation Agency were conducted; segments included a bridge along the Pasig River between the planned Radial Road 4 (now Kalayaan Avenue; later designated to J. P. Rizal Avenue) and Pasig Boulevard and the Santolan (now Bonny Serrano Avenue) to Aurora Boulevard. The next study would link the Manila North Expressway (MNE), now known as the North Luzon Expressway (NLEX) and Navotas, linking with the future extension of Radial Road 10, as the Manila-Bataan Coastal Road. Another study that would pass from the MNE to Aurora Boulevard via Republic and Katipunan Avenues. Some proposals were never materialized; however, in 1998, the Manila North Tollways Corporation (MNTC, later NLEX Corporation) and the Philippine National Construction Corporation (PNCC) handled the proposal of the planned northern segment, which is now partially operational as of 2025.

Construction of Circumferential Road 5 began in 1986. The project also involved building new alignments that would combine with old existing roads, including Eulogio Rodriguez Jr. Avenue, built in the 1960s. The first phase of the C-5 Road from the South Luzon Expressway at the Pasay–Taguig boundary to Ortigas Avenue, Pasig, was officially inaugurated by President Fidel V. Ramos on December 30, 1994. The project, which costs approximately ₱1.2 billion to construct, also included the existing segment of Eulogio Rodriguez Jr. Avenue between Ortigas Avenue and Pasig Boulevard. The project was funded by Japan's Overseas Economic Cooperation Fund (OECF, subsequently Japan Bank for International Cooperation, and currently JICA). Under the power of Republic Act No. 8224, which was passed on November 6, 1996, the C-5 road was legally known as President Carlos P. Garcia Avenue after the eighth President of the Philippines, Carlos P. Garcia.

On July 23, 2007, President Gloria Macapagal Arroyo announced in her State of the Nation Address that C-5 Road will be extended to northern Metro Manila up to the North Luzon Expressway in Valenzuela. On December 1, 2007, C-5 Extension's segment between Dr. Santos Avenue in Parañaque and South Luzon Expressway's West Service Road in Pasay was opened to the public. The Moonwalk Access Road in Pasay has been integrated as part of the extension. From April 2009 to June 2010, the NLEX–Mindanao Avenue Link (Harbor Link Segment 8.1) in Valenzuela and Congressional Avenue Extension from Tandang Sora to Luzon Avenues in Quezon City were constructed. Carlos P. Garcia Avenue Extension in the South Extension in Parañaque was also opened. In March 2015, the NLEX–Karuhatan Link (Harbor Link Segment 9) was opened to all motorists. The opening of Segment 9 from NLEx to MacArthur Highway in Karuhatan, Valenzuela served as a preparation for the Holy Week season. Presently, the Luzon Avenue Flyover connecting Tandang Sora and Luzon Avenues across Commonwealth Avenue is open to all motorists. Before the flyover's opening, the Congressional Avenue Extension from Visayas to Luzon Avenue was opened in 2010 to decongest heavy traffic in the Visayas–Tandang Sora Avenue Intersection.

From September 2022 to April 2024, the C-5 Quirino Flyover, which crosses Diego Cera and Fruto Santos Avenues in Las Piñas, was constructed on the C-5 Extension. It opened on April 24, 2024. The flyover is allegedly built as a measure to block the construction of Phase 2 of the LRT Line 1 Cavite Extension, where its right of way passes through the land where the flyover currently stands.

On November 19, 2024, Kaingin Service Road, which bypasses the Kaingin Road alignment in Santo Niño, Parañaque, was completed and was turned over by CAVITEX Infrastructure Corporation to the Parañaque City Government. It later officially became part of C-5 Extension's alignment, replacing Kaingin Road, which was later dismantled during the construction of CAVITEX–C-5 Link Segment 3B.

In October 2026, the Department of Transportation (DOTr) identified C-5 as one of 3 roads to have a busway (bus rapid transit).

=== Controversies ===
In 2010, the Senate of the Philippines investigated the south extension project, which would pass several of Manny Villar's properties, such as Camella. The Senate concluded that Villar, as Senate president, intervened in the project to benefit his business interests. It also ordered Villar to return P6.22 billion to the government. The original extension, called the Manila–Cavite Toll Expressway Project (MCTEP), was already approved by the Senate and would have been made as a toll expressway. The project eventually resurrected as C-5 Southlink Expressway (now known as CAVITEX–C-5 Link).

=== C-5 Expressway ===
In 1993, the Japan International Cooperation Agency (JICA) studied the proposed urban expressway system in Metro Manila. The master plan for the planned network, meant to have 150 kilometers (93 mi) of expressways, included the proposed Expressway Route C-5 that would follow the old C-5 alignment from Navotas to Parañaque with a total length of about 45.8 kilometers (28.5 mi). In the 1999 Metro Manila Urban Transport Integrated Study, the plan for the 30.9-kilometer (19.2 mi) elevated expressway was also planned, spanning from the Manila–Cavite Expressway to South Fairview. This was also mentioned again in the 2003 study.

In 2014, under the Roadmap for Transport Infrastructure Development for Metro Manila and Its Surrounding Areas (Region III & Region IV-A; also known as the Metro Manila Dream Plan), the JICA study proposes a 46.7-kilometer (29.0 mi) expressway from the Manila–Cavite Expressway to San Jose Del Monte in Bulacan to pass above the existing C-5. This was mentioned again in the 2019 follow-up report. In the late 2010s, NLEX Corporation (formerly Manila North Tollways Corporation) and CAVITEX Infrastructure Inc. submitted a proposal for C-5 Expressway, a 19-kilometer (12 mi) fully elevated expressway that would further decongest the existing C-5 and provide a fully controlled-access route between CAVITEX C-5 Link and NLEX Segment 8.2 (C-5 Link). The proposed expressway would utilize portions of the existing C-5's right of way between SLEX and Pasig Boulevard and run above Marikina River from Pasig Boulevard to Luzon Avenue.

== Events ==
- May 23, 2019, supporters of Taguig–Pateros 1st district Representative Arnel Cerafica held a protest along C-5 near Ususan, Taguig, to contest Cerafica's loss in the Taguig mayoral race to former Taguig 2nd district Representative Lino Cayetano, alleging irregularities such as malfunctioning vote-counting machines and vote-buying. The rally caused heavy traffic along C-5 between South Luzon Expressway and Julia Vargas Avenue in Pasig.
- Since March 16, 2025, the segment of C-5's service road between Dalanghita Street and Taguig Eco Park (near Bayani Road) in Pinagsama, Taguig, is a venue of the weekly Car-Free Sundays initiative by the Taguig City Government. The segment is thus closed to vehicular traffic early every Sunday morning.

== Exits and intersections ==
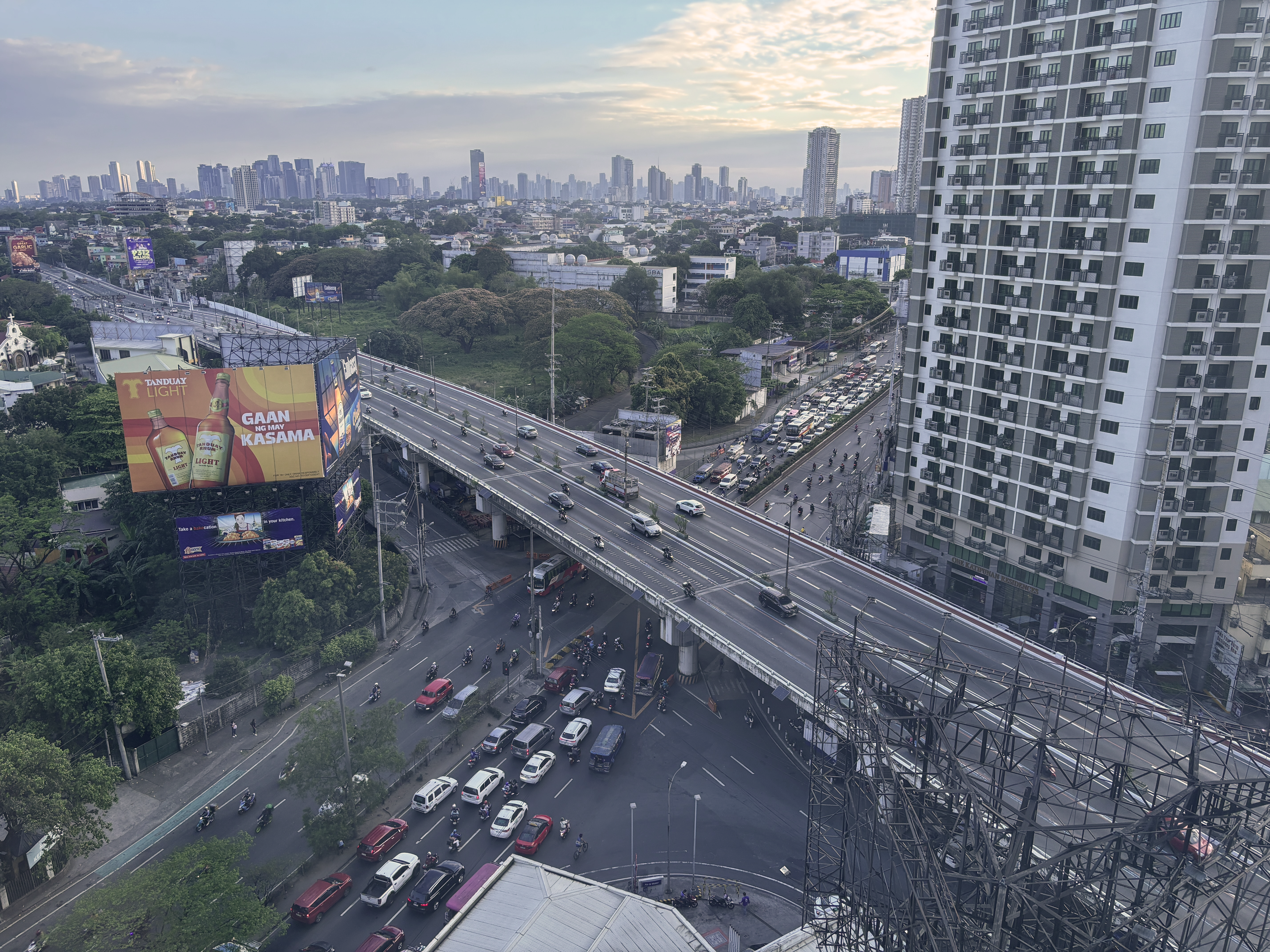
Aurora Boulevard–Katipunan Avenue Interchange

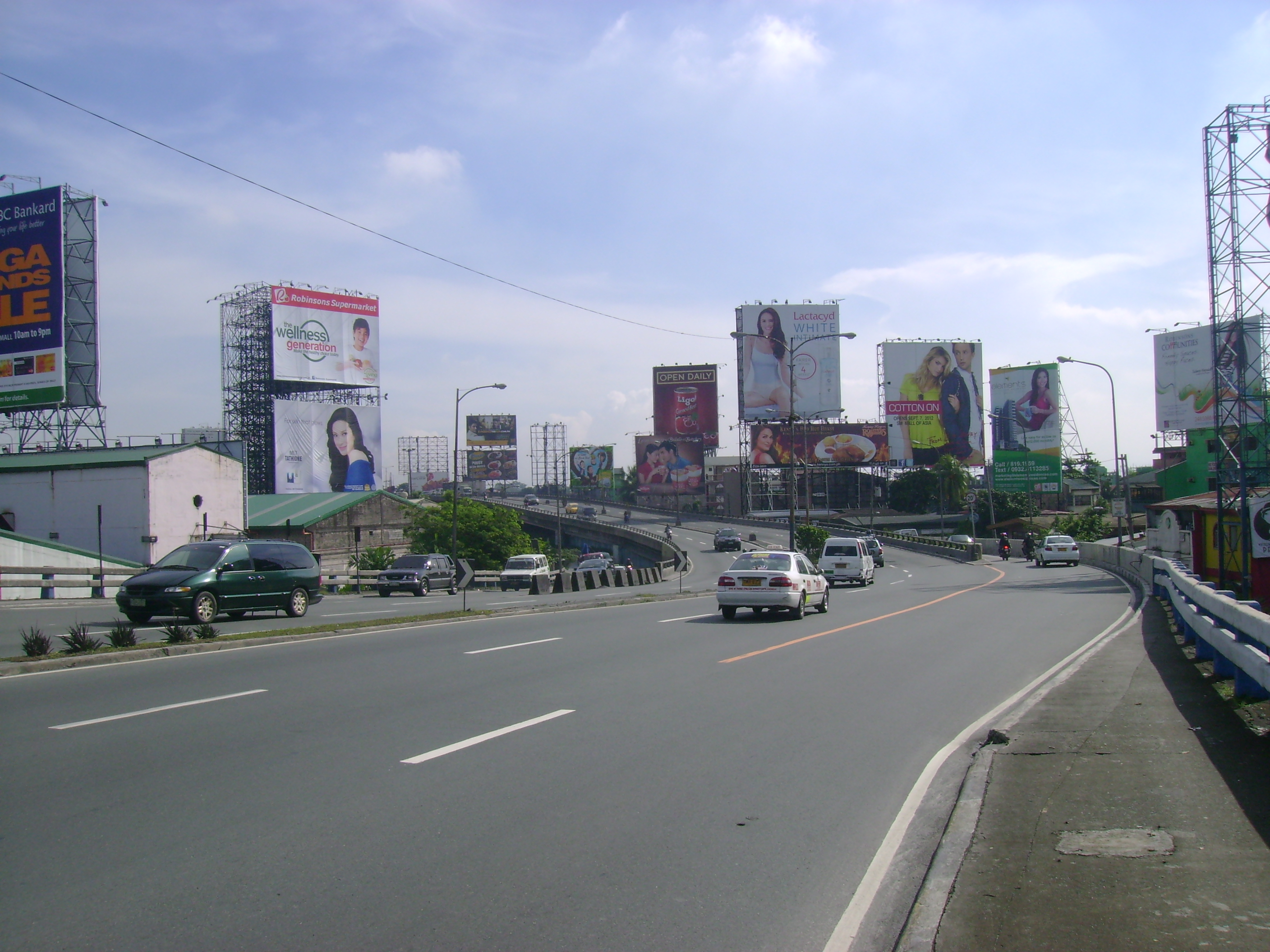
C-5 Bagong Ilog Flyover

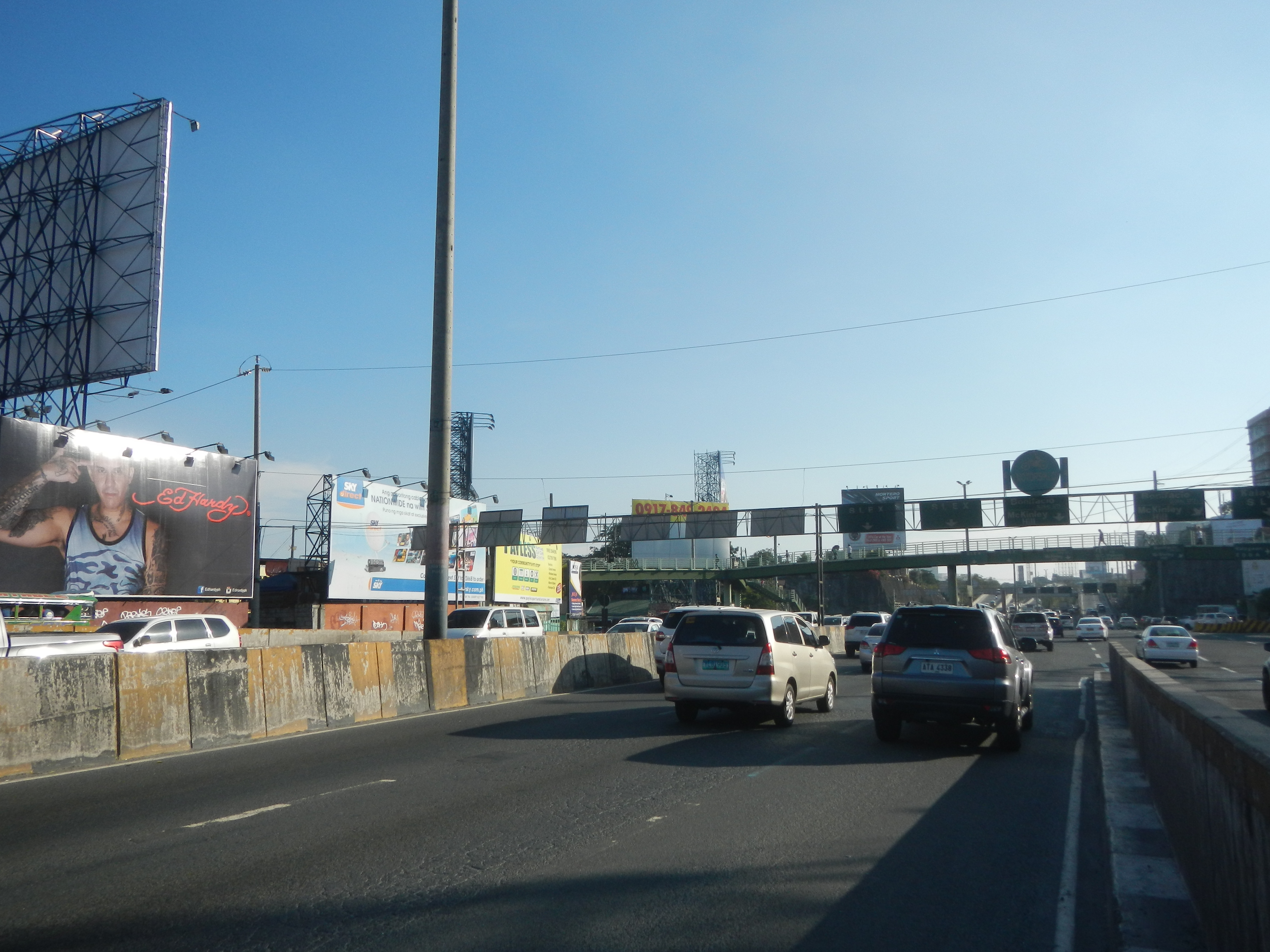
C-5-Kalayaan Interchange

C-5 Road near SM Aura, Taguig

Province	City/Municipality (Note: Sources:)	km (Note: Sources:)	mi	Destinations	Notes
Taguig		14.1266	8.7779	East Service Road	Southern terminus
Taguig				E5 (CAVITEX C-5 Link) – Pasay	Southbound exit and northbound entrance. Six-lane tolled flyover to C-5 Extension across SLEX. Also known as CAVITEX C-5 Link Segment 3A-1
Taguig				AH26 (SLEX) – Alabang, Batangas	Half-Y interchange. C-5 Exit of SLEX. South end.
Taguig		15.1851– 15.2237	9.4356– 9.4596	Bayani Road, Marichu Rodriguez Tiñga Avenue	Half-diamond and half-partial cloverleaf interchange. Access to Libingan ng mga Bayani. Future Southeast Metro Manila Expressway (SEMME) exit.
Taguig				Pamayanang Diego Silang Avenue	At-grade intersection. No southbound access. Future Southeast Metro Manila Expressway (SEMME) exit.
Taguig		17.000	10.563	Scorpion Street	No northbound entrance. Northbound access via Pamayanang Diego Silang Avenue/C-5 Service Road. Former diamond interchange. More commonly known as Palar Underpass/Commando Bridge.
Taguig				Pedro Cayetano Boulevard	Access via C-5 Service Road for northbound and Palar Underpass for southbound.
Taguig				Alligator Street	No Southbound access. Access to Barangay Rizal.
Taguig				Blue Voz Street	No southbound access. Access to Barangays Rizal and Pembo.
Taguig				Upper McKinley Road	Traffic light intersection. Former half-diamond interchange with no northbound access. Access to McKinley Hill.
Taguig				26th Street, Sampaguita Street, Target Street	Diamond interchange. Access to Market! Market!, Bonifacio Global City, and Barangay Pembo
Taguig				Market-Market Service Road	Southbound exit only. Access to Market! Market!, BGC Bus Market! Market! Bus Station, and SM Aura.
Taguig				32nd Street	Directional T interchange. No northbound exit. Access to Bonifacio Global City.
Taguig				N190 (Kalayaan Avenue)	C-5-Kalayaan Interchange. Former traffic light intersection. Access to Kalayaan Avenue westbound from C-5 northbound via elevated U-turn slot. Access to Kalayaan Avenue eastbound from C-5 southbound via elevated U-turn slot.
Pasig River		20.418	12.687	C.P. Garcia Bridge	
Pasig				South end of Bagong Ilog Flyover. South end of E. Rodriguez Jr. Avenue segment.	
Pasig				N141 (Pasig Boulevard) / Maximo Flores Street	Traffic light intersection for southbound at-grade only. No left turn and U-turn from C-5 southbound. Route number on at-grade changes from N11 to N141.
Pasig				N142 (Pasig Boulevard Extension)	Traffic light at-grade intersection.
Pasig				Canley Road	Southbound at-grade intersection. No northbound access.
Pasig		14.1285	8.7790	North end of Bagong Ilog Flyover (Route number on at-grade changes from N141 to N11.)	
Pasig				R. Lanuza Avenue	Traffic light intersection. Access to PhilSports Arena.
Pasig				Kaginhawaan Bridge	Northbound only. Access to Dr. Sixto Antonio Avenue via P. Conducto Street.
Pasig				Paseo de Arco	Northbound entry and exit only. Access to Arcovia City
Pasig				Julia Vargas Avenue	Traffic light intersection. Access to SM Center Pasig, Tiendesitas, Ortigas East, and Ortigas Center.
Pasig				Eagle Drive	Northbound entry only
Pasig				South end of Ortigas Flyover	
Pasig				N60 (Ortigas Avenue)	C-5-Ortigas Interchange. Traffic light intersection at grade. No left turns from northbound. Access to C-5 southbound either through flyover ramp or traffic light intersection.
Quezon City		16.986– 12.612	10.555– 7.837	North end of Ortigas Flyover	
Quezon City				Greenmeadows Avenue	Traffic light intersection
Quezon City				Calle Industria	Traffic light intersection
Quezon City				Eastwood Drive	Traffic light intersection. Access to Eastwood City.
Quezon City				South end of Libis Flyover	
Quezon City		14.234	8.845	C-5 Access Road	Exit only for C-5 northbound. Entrance to C-5 southbound and northbound. North end of E. Rodriguez Jr. Avenue segment. East end of Bonny Serrano Avenue segment.
Quezon City				West end of Libis Flyover	
Quezon City				East end of Libis Tunnel	
Quezon City		11.975	7.441	N185 (Bonny Serrano Avenue) / Katipunan Avenue	Traffic light intersection. West end of Bonny Serrano Avenue segment. South end of Katipunan Avenue segment.
Quezon City				North end of Libis Tunnel	
Quezon City				P. Tuazon Boulevard, Major S. Dizon Street	No left turns. Right-in/right-out for northbound intersection.
Quezon City				South end of Katipunan Flyover	
Quezon City				N59 (Aurora Boulevard/Marcos Highway)	Left turn and right turn from northbound and southbound service roads.
Quezon City				Xavierville Avenue	Accessible from Katipunan Flyover southbound service road only
Quezon City				North end of Katipunan Flyover	
Quezon City		13.944– 15.1060	8.664– 9.3864	Carlos P. Garcia Avenue	Traffic light intersection. Route number change from N11 to N129.
Quezon City				Magsaysay Avenue	Gated access to the University of the Philippines Diliman. No left turns to Katipunan Avenue northbound.
Quezon City				Mactan Street	Traffic light intersection. Former roundabout.
Quezon City				Capitol Drive	
Quezon City		15.743	9.782	Tandang Sora Avenue	Southbound access only. North end of Katipunan Avenue segment.
Quezon City				South end of Luzon Avenue Flyover	
Quezon City				N170 (Commonwealth Avenue)	Ramps with U-turns
Quezon City				North end of Luzon Avenue Flyover	
Quezon City				Luzon Avenue	North end of Luzon Avenue segment. West end of Congressional Avenue segment.
Quezon City				Tandang Sora Avenue	Access via U-turn slots from opposite directions
Quezon City				Visayas Avenue	Traffic light intersection
Quezon City				N129 (Congressional Avenue) / N128 (Mindanao Avenue)	Traffic light intersection. West end of Congressional Avenue segment. South end of Mindanao Avenue segment. Route number changes from N129 to N128.
Quezon City				Road 20, Road 20 Extension	Accessible via U-turn slot from opposite directions
Quezon City				Tandang Sora Avenue	Accessible via U-turn slot from opposite directions. Access to St. James College of Quezon City
Quezon City				South end of Mindanao Avenue Underpass	
Quezon City				N127 (Quirino Highway)	Traffic light intersection
Quezon City				North end of Mindanao Avenue Underpass	
Valenzuela				N128 (Mindanao Avenue)	North end of Mindanao Avenue section
1.000 mi = 1.609 km; 1.000 km = 0.621 mi: Incomplete access; Route transition

=== NLEX Mindanao Avenue & Karuhatan Link ===
The entire route is located in Valenzuela. The kilometer count, which would be shown here in its approximate values, increments east and west of Harbor Link Interchange as it branches off NLEX Main.

km	mi	Exit	Name	Destinations	Notes
15.9	9.9		Mindanao Avenue	N128 (Mindanao Avenue) – Quezon City	Eastern end of expressway; link to the future NLEX Segment 8.2
15.39	9.56	Mindanao toll plaza (westbound only)			
15.29	9.50	Mindanao toll plaza expansion (westbound only; exclusively for Class 1)			
13	8.1		Harbor Link Interchange	AH26 – Balintawak, Tarlac	Cloverleaf interchange with collector lanes; kilometer count reverses
14.71	9.14		Parada	Parada, Maysan	Westbound exit only
15.00	9.32		Gen. T. De Leon	Gen. T. de Leon	Eastbound exit only
16.15	10.04	Karuhatan toll plaza (eastbound only)			
16.2	10.1		Karuhatan	N1 (MacArthur Highway) – Karuhatan	Diamond interchange; northern terminus of C-5; continues west as E5 (NLEX Segment 10)
1.000 mi = 1.609 km; 1.000 km = 0.621 mi: Concurrency terminus; Incomplete access; Tolled

=== CAVITEX–C-5 Link ===
This entire route is located in Taguig, Pasay, and Paranaque.

Province	City/Municipality	km	mi	Exit	Name	Destinations	Notes
Taguig					Taguig	N11 (C.P. Garcia Avenue) – Taguig, Pasig, Pateros	Eastbound exit and westbound entrance; eastern terminus
Taguig				Taguig Toll Plaza (eastbound only)			
Pasay					SLEX	AH26 (SLEX) – Manila	Proposed eastbound exit and westbound entrance
Pasay				Merville Toll Plaza (westbound only)			
Pasay						C-5 Road Extension	Former western terminus (2019–2022)
Pasay					Merville	C-5 Road Extension	Westbound exit and eastbound entrance
Parañaque						C-5 Road Extension	Westbound exit and eastbound entrance; former western terminus (2022–2024)
Parañaque					Parañaque (Sucat)	N195 (Ninoy Aquino Avenue) / Victor Medina Street / C-5 Extension – NAIA Terminals 1 and 2, Sucat	Folded diamond interchange
Parañaque				Sucat Toll Plaza			
Parañaque					R-1 (CAVITEX)	E3 (CAVITEX) – Bacoor, Las Piñas, Kawit, Manila, Pasay	Western terminus; trumpet interchange
1.000 mi = 1.609 km; 1.000 km = 0.621 mi: Closed/former; Incomplete access; Tolled; Unopened

=== C-5 Extension ===
Province	City/Municipality	km	mi	Destinations	Notes
Las Piñas				E3 (CAVITEX) – Manila	Right-in/right-out interchange. Entry to CAVITEx only. Western end of C-5 Extension.
Las Piñas				West end of C5 Quirino Flyover	
Las Piñas				N62 (P. Diego Cera Avenue)	At-grade intersection
Las Piñas				Fruto Santos Avenue	At-grade intersection
Las Piñas				East end of C5 Quirino Flyover	
Las Piñas				Gatchalian Road	At-grade intersection
Las Piñas				Villareal Street	At-grade intersection. Southbound access only.
Parañaque				South end of Sucat Flyover	
Parañaque				N63 (Dr. A. Santos Avenue)	Eastbound exit and westbound entrance. Access to SM City Sucat.
Parañaque				Old Sucat Road	Westbound exit and eastbound entrance. Access to Amvel City and Dr. A. Santos Avenue.
Parañaque				North end of Sucat Flyover	
Parañaque				Amvel City	Partial cloverleaf interchange. Access to N195 (Ninoy Aquino Avenue).
Parañaque				Multinational Avenue	Traffic light intersection. Serves Multinational Village. This is known for infamously causing severe heavy traffic during rush hours.
Parañaque				E. Rodriguez Avenue	At-grade intersection. Future interchange with CAVITEX–C-5 Link
Parañaque				E5 (CAVITEX–C-5 Link) – Taguig	Eastbound exit and westbound entrance. Also known as C-5 Southlink Expressway Segment 3A2
Pasay				Neil Armstrong Avenue	At-grade intersection. Also known as Moonwalk Exit due to its gated accessibility into Moonwalk Village.
Pasay				E5 (CAVITEX–C-5 Link) – Taguig	Eastbound exit and westbound entrance. Also known as CAVITEX–C-5 Link Segment 3A1
Pasay				Washington Street	Access to Merville Park Subdivision
Pasay				Moonwalk Access Road	Eastbound access only
Pasay				West Service Road	At-grade intersection. Eastern end of C-5 Extension.
1.000 mi = 1.609 km; 1.000 km = 0.621 mi: Incomplete access

== Landmarks ==
This is from South Luzon Expressway in Taguig to General Luis Street in Valenzuela:

=== Taguig ===
- Libingan ng mga Bayani
- Heritage Memorial Park
- McKinley Hill
- Bonifacio Global City
  - SM Aura
  - Market! Market!
- Hotel 101 the Fort
- Circumferential Road 5–Kalayaan Avenue Interchange
- C.P. Garcia Bridge (Pasig River)

=== Pasig ===
- Universal Robina
- Bagong Ilog flyover
- Valle Verde
- Arcovia City
- SM Center Pasig
- Tiendesitas
- The Grove by Rockwell
- Christ's Commission Fellowship
- Circumferential Road 5–Ortigas Avenue Interchange

=== Quezon City ===
- Bridgetowne
  - Opus Mall
- Parklinks
- Eastwood City
  - MDC 100 Building
  - Mercury Drug main office
- Quirino Memorial Medical Center
- Philippine School of Business Administration
- Real Monasterio de Santa Clara de Manila
- Ateneo de Manila University
  - Blue Eagle Gym
  - Ateneo Art Gallery
- Miriam College
- U.P. Town Center
- University of the Philippines Diliman
- Balara Fillers Park
- Congressional Town Center
- Quirino Highway–Mindanao Avenue interchange
- Metro Manila subway depot
