= N11 highway =

Road in the Philippines

Route 11

- Carlos P. Garcia Avenue, a segment of N11, near Market! Market! in Taguig

Route information
- Maintained by the Department of Public Works and Highways
- Length: 18 km (11 mi)

Major junctions
- North end: N129 (Katipunan Avenue) / C.P. Garcia Avenue in Quezon City
- N59 (Aurora Boulevard) in Quezon City; N185 (Bonny Serrano Avenue) in Quezon City; N60 (Ortigas Avenue) in Pasig; N141 (Pasig Boulevard) in Pasig; N190 (Kalayaan Avenue) in Taguig; E5 (Southeast Metro Manila Expressway) in Taguig; E5 (C-5 Southlink Expressway) in Taguig; AH26 (South Luzon Expressway) in Taguig
- South end: East Service Road in Taguig

Location
- Country: Philippines
- Major cities: Taguig, Pasig, Quezon City

Highway system
- Roads in the Philippines; Highways; Expressways; List
← N10	→ N51

National Route 11 (N11) is an 18-kilometer (11 mi) major primary route that forms part of the Philippine highway network. It is a component and the main route of Circumferential Road 5 (C-5), connecting the cities of Taguig, Pasig and Quezon City.

== History ==
When the routes were assigned by the Department of Public Works and Highways, the segment of Circumferential Road 5 (C-5) from Taguig to Quezon City, except for its at-grade section below the Bagong Ilog Flyover in Pasig, was assigned as N11. These roads under C-5 include Carlos P. Garcia Avenue, Eulogio Rodriguez Jr. Avenue, Bonny Serrano Avenue, and Katipunan Avenue.

== Route description ==
The route's northern terminus starts from a route change from N129 while making a junction on C.P. Garcia Avenue, a tertiary road in Barangay U.P. Campus, Quezon City. It traverses Quezon City, Pasig, and Taguig. In Quezon City, the highway then follows Katipunan Avenue's at-grade section parallel to the Katipunan/Aurora Flyover, near Marikina, which is classified as a tertiary road that carries traffic crossing N59. Later, it follows the Libis Tunnel, Libis Flyover, and the at-grade section of C-5 as it transitions from Katipunan Avenue to Eulogio Rodriguez Jr. Avenue via Bonny Serrano Avenue. In Pasig, the highway is carried by the Bagong Ilog Flyover as it parallels another C-5 route (N141) below the flyover. Upon leaving Taguig, the route meets the respective interchanges of CAVITEX–C-5 Link and South Luzon Expressway (SLEX) before its southern terminus at the East Service Road, a frontage road of the Skyway At-Grade section of SLEX.
