= Filoil EcoOil Centre =

Sports arena in Metro Manila, Philippines

Playtime Filoil Centre
- Filoil EcoOil Centre

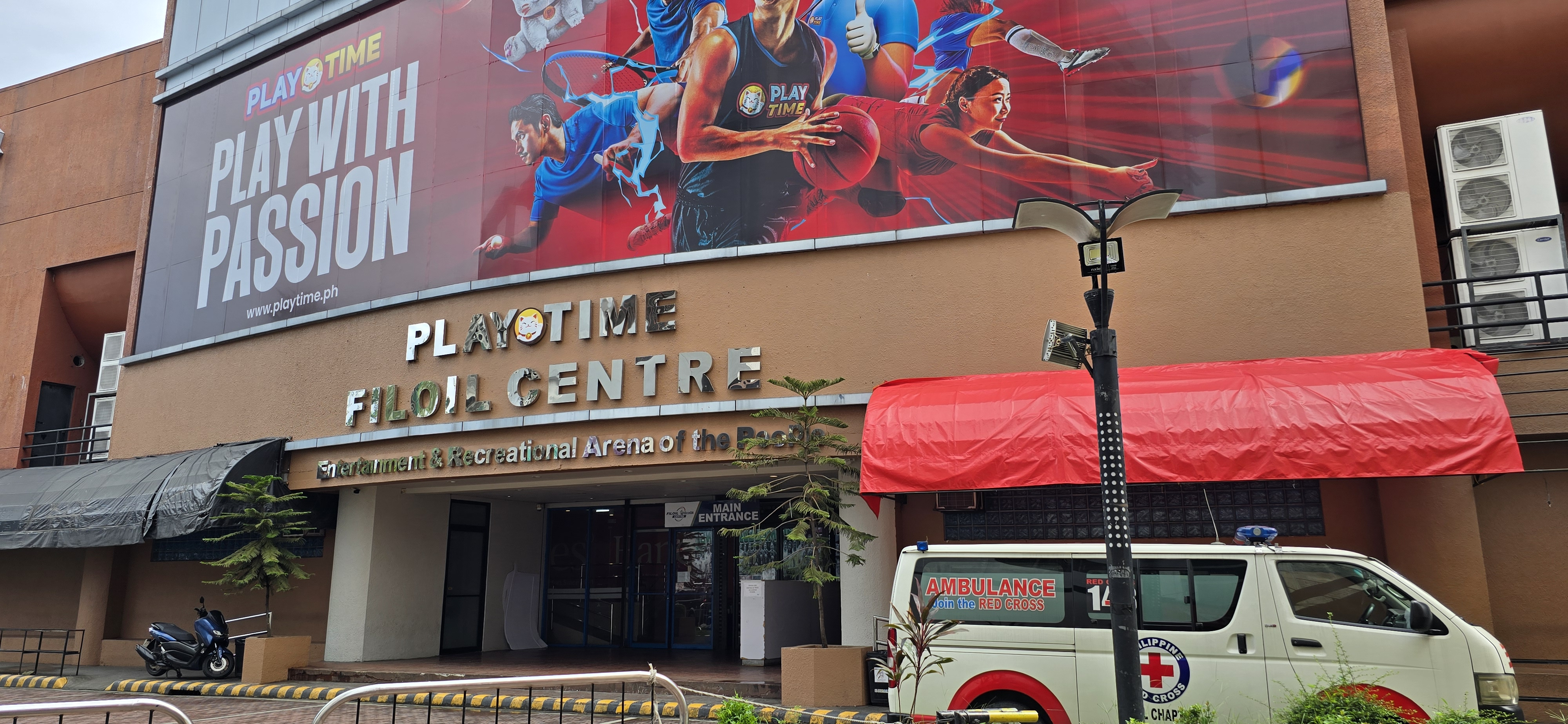
- The arena facade in 2025 as Playtime Filoil Centre.
- Interactive map of Playtime Filoil Centre
- Former names: The Arena in San Juan; Filoil Flying V Arena; Filoil Flying V Centre (2016–2022); Filoil EcoOil Centre (2022–2025)
- Location: Santolan Road, Corazon de Jesus, San Juan, Philippines
- Coordinates: 14°36′20″N 121°01′58″E
- Owner: San Juan city government
- Operator: Homegrown Olympic Management Enterprises
- Capacity: 6,000

Construction
- Opened: 2006
- Architect: Edgar C. Lee

Tenants
- Leagues and events: Philippine Basketball Association; Premier Volleyball League; Philippine Super Liga (formerly); UAAP (2008–present); NCAA (2007–present); Filoil EcoOil Preseason Cup (2007–present); Philippine Collegiate Champions League; Teams: San Miguel Alab Pilipinas (ABL) (2018–2019); San Juan Knights (MPBL/PSL) (2018–present); San Juan Lady Knights (WMPBL) (2025)

Playtime Filoil Centre also known as by its former name Filoil EcoOil Centre, is an indoor arena located along Bonny Serrano Avenue in San Juan, Metro Manila, Philippines. The arena opened in 2006 as The Arena in San Juan and has hosted games for multiple sports leagues and international events.

The league's notable tenants include the Premier Volleyball League (PVL), National Collegiate Athletic Association (NCAA), and the San Juan Knights of the Maharlika Pilipinas Basketball League (MPBL). It is also home to the annual collegiate Filoil EcoOil Preseason Cup. Other leagues such as the Philippine Basketball Association (PBA) and the University Athletic Association of the Philippines (UAAP) have also hosted games at the venue on an occasional basis.

== History ==
The Playtime Filoil Centre first opened as The Arena in 2006. The Arena started adopting names under the Filoil brand in 2009 when Filoil Philippines Corporation became the naming rights sponsor.

In 2015, the San Juan city government turned over the operations of the venue to the Homegrown Olympic Management Enterprises (HOME).

== Facilities ==
The Playtime Filoil Centre has a seating capacity of 6,000.

== Names ==
The Arena is currently named Playtime Filoil Centre since May 2025 due to sponsorship by betting website, Playtime and petroleum firm, Filoil Philippines Corporation. It was inaugurated as The Arena in 2006. Filoil has naming rights over the indoor arena since 2009. The venue has been known under various names since then.

It is also known alternatively as the Entertainment and Recreational Arena of the People or The Arena.

== Tenants ==
The arena has been used by numerous leagues across the country. In basketball, the Philippine Basketball Association, University Athletic Association of the Philippines (since 2009), National Collegiate Athletic Association (since 2007) are among the leagues that have used the venue for their games. It has also hosted basketball games of the Maharlika Pilipinas Basketball League and Pilipinas Super League as the home venue of the San Juan Knights franchise since 2018. Alab Pilipinas also used the arena as one of its home venues during their time in the ASEAN Basketball League. The Filoil EcoOil Preseason Cup (since 2007) and Philippine Collegiate Champions League are among the events that take place in the Centre.

The arena has also become known as the country's "volleyball central", having also hosted its share of volleyball leagues such as the Premier Volleyball League and the defunct Philippine Super Liga. The UAAP and NCAA also use the venue for their respective volleyball tournaments. The Centre was also used as a main venue for the San Juan Mayor's Cup, a basketball and volleyball tournament for the San Juan government employees.

== Gallery ==
The arena as the Filoil Flying V Centre for the 2019 Southeast Asian Games

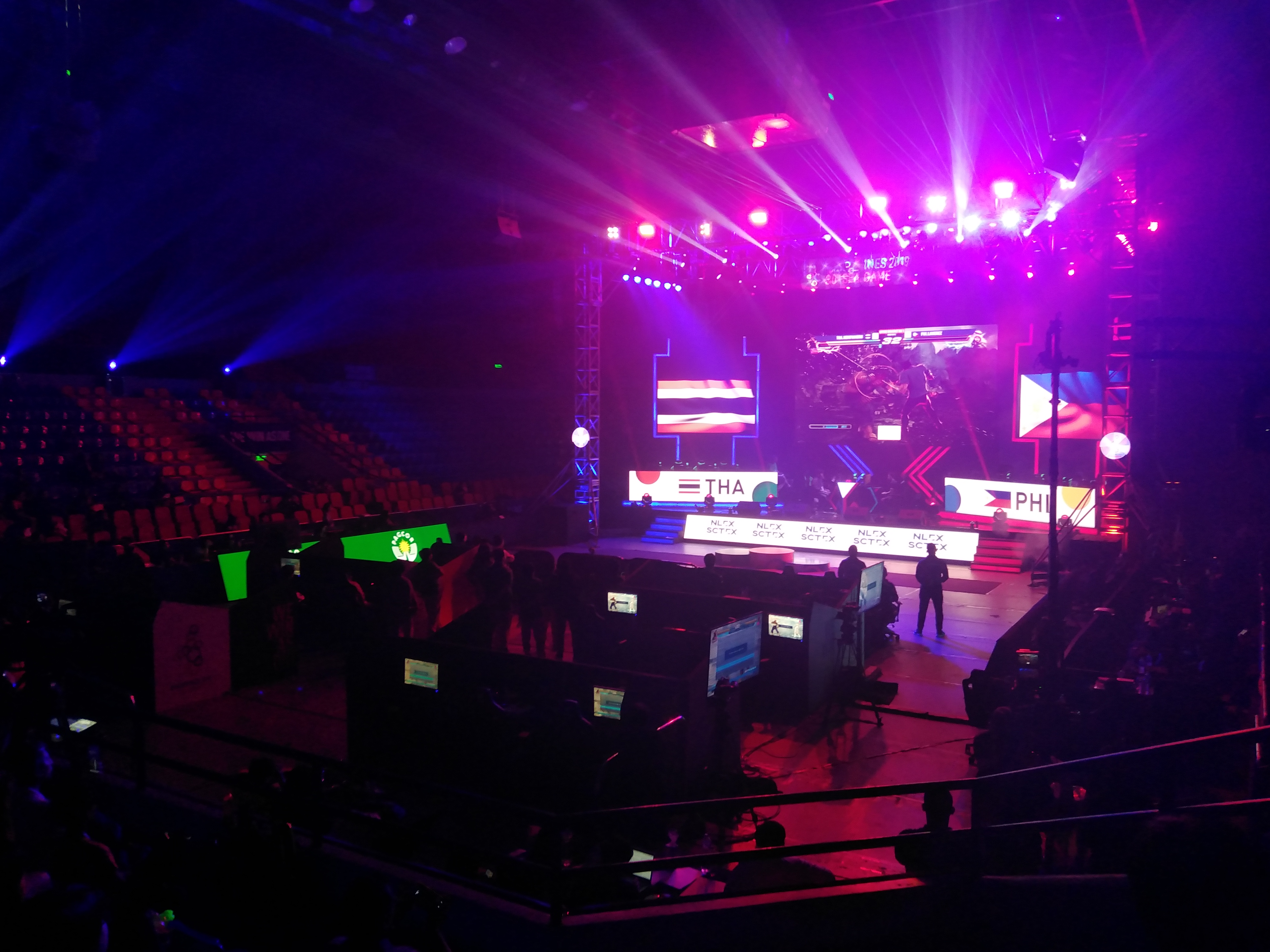
An esports match inside the arena during the 2019 Southeast Asian Games

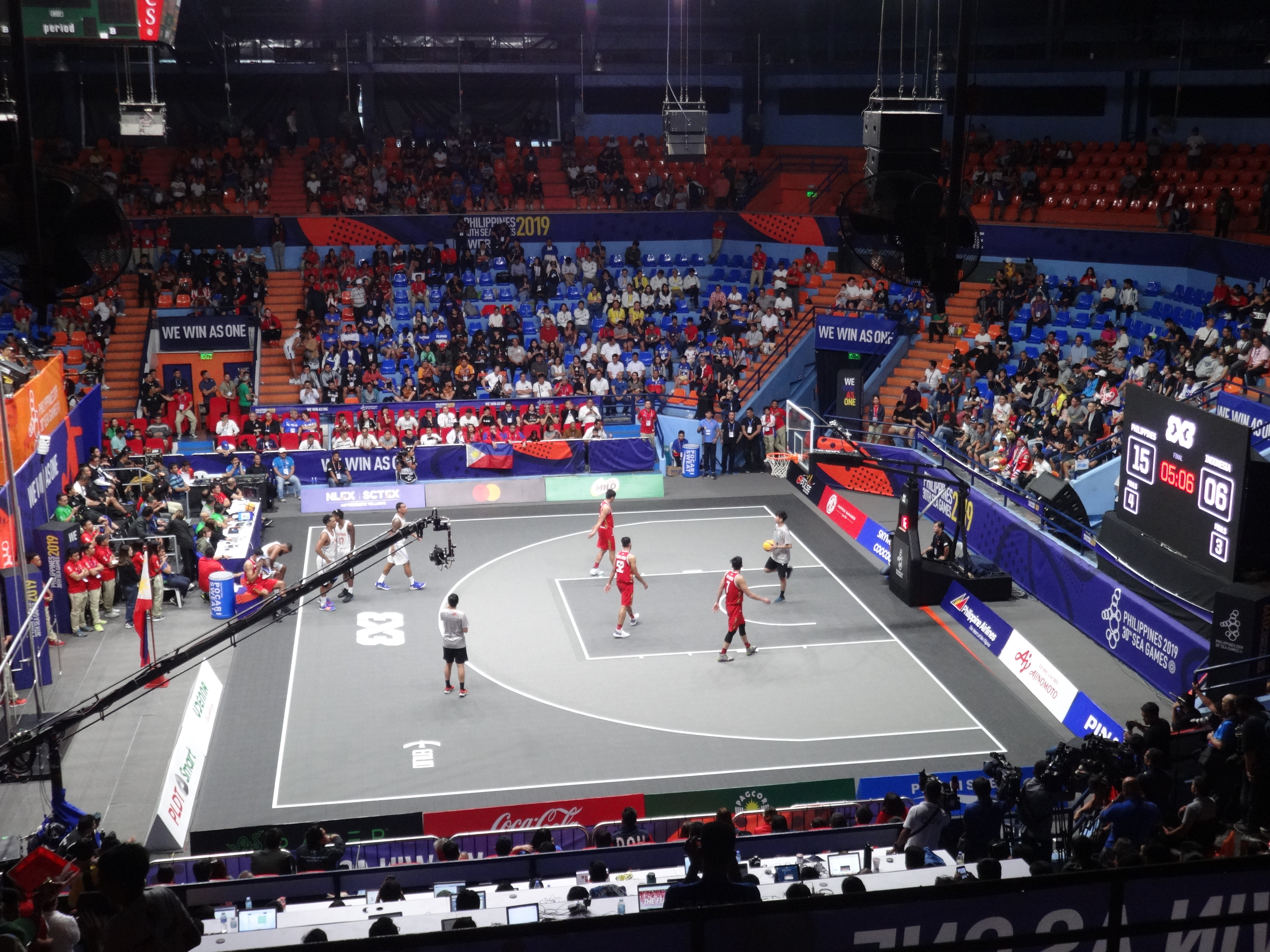
2019 Southeast Asian Games 3x3 basketball final

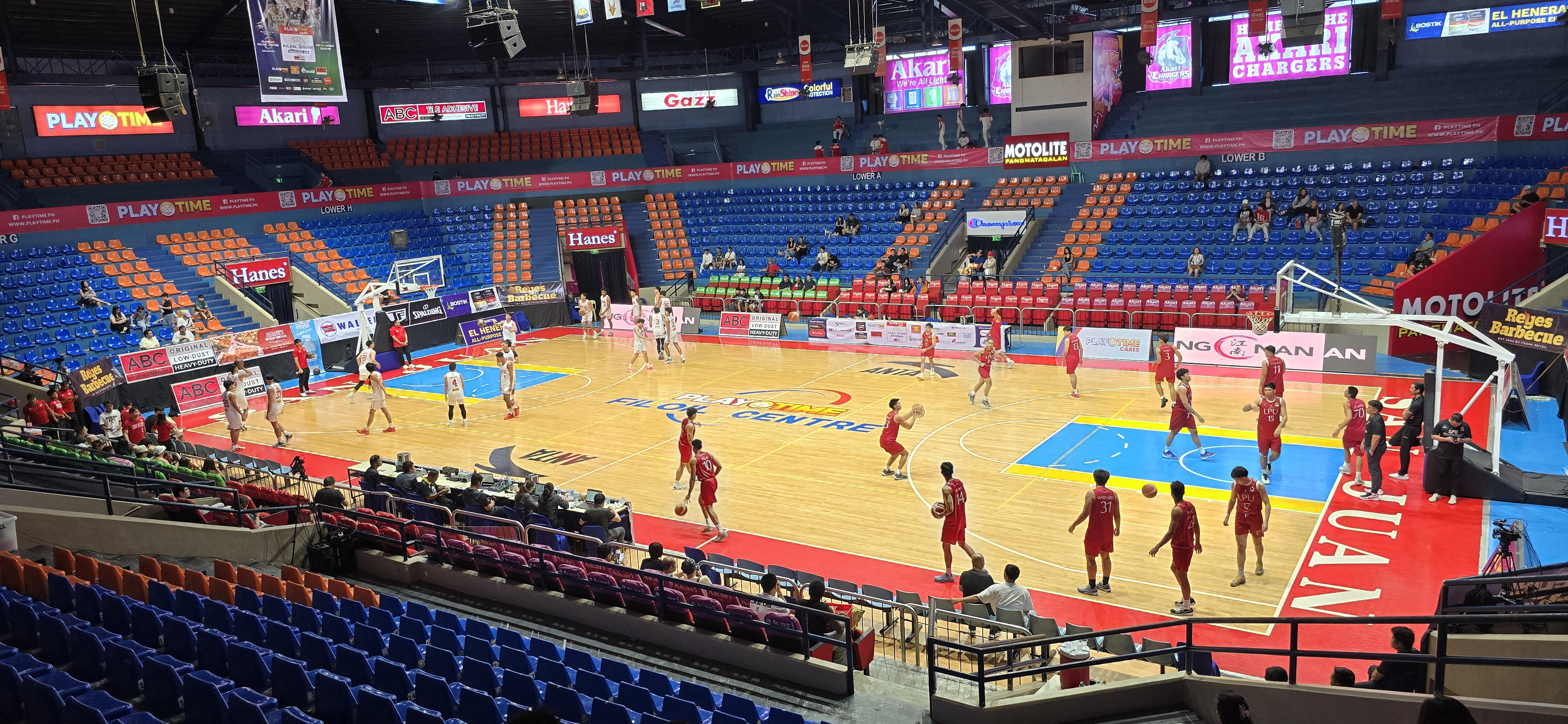
Court in 2025.

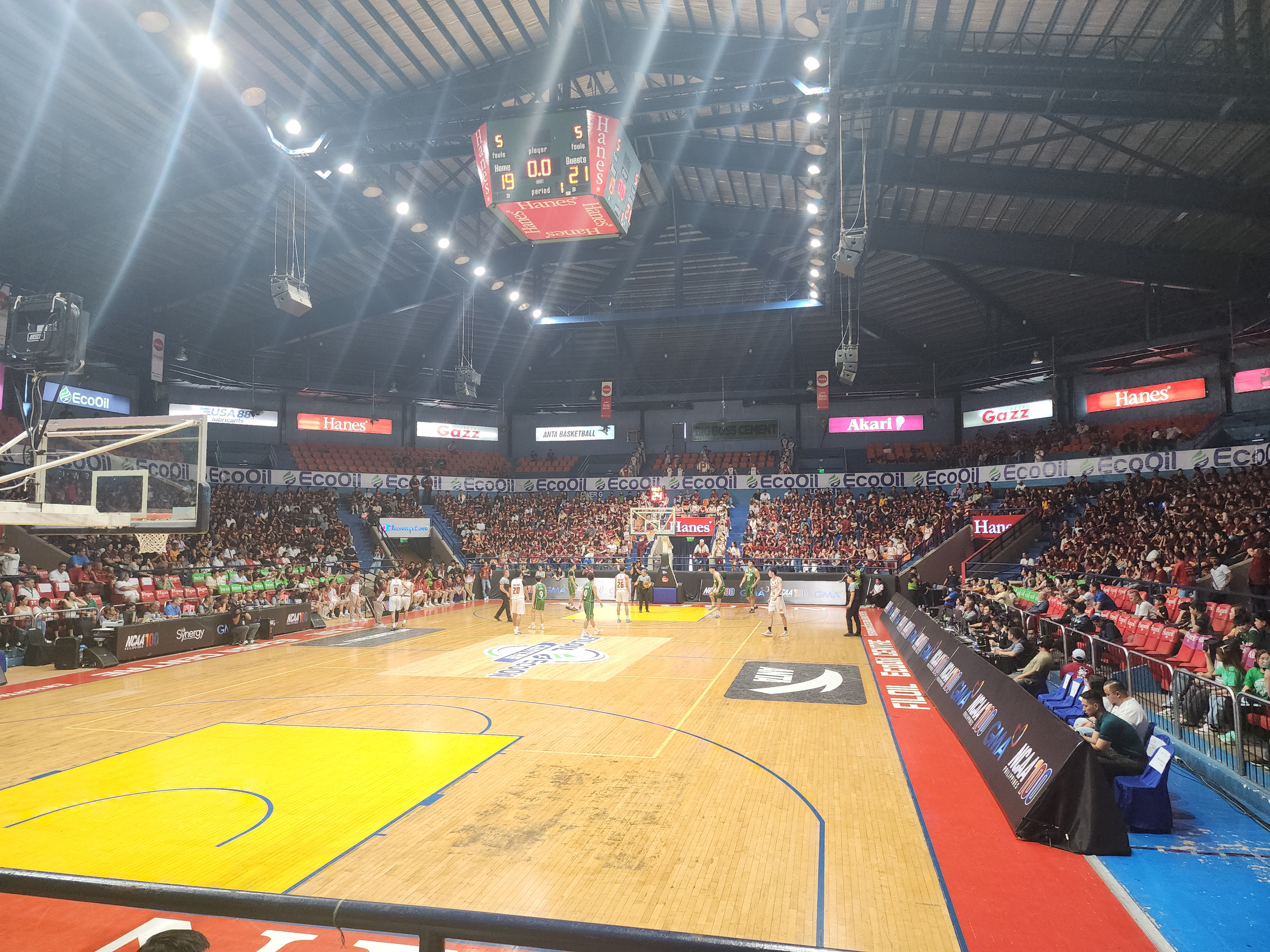
Courtside in 2025 during the NCAA Season 100 Juniors' Basketball Finals.

== Notes ==
Preceded by San Juan Gym	Home of the San Juan Knights; 2018–present	Succeeded by current
Preceded by First venue	Host of the Premier Volleyball League All-Star Game; 2017; 2019	Succeeded by Candon City Arena
