= Boni Serrano =

Filipino soldier of the Korean War

Colonel Bonny Merioles Serrano
- Born: Bonny Merioles Serrano; 4 April 1922; Uson, Masbate, Insular Government of the Philippine Islands, United States
- Died: 2 January 1970 (aged 47); Manila, Philippines
- Burial place: Loyola Memorial Park, Marikina, Philippines
- Spouse: Cora Real Serrano
- Children: 3
- Military career
- Rank: Colonel
- Unit: Philippine Expeditionary Forces to Korea
- Conflicts: Korean War
- Awards: 48, including Medal of Valor
- Memorials: Bonny Serrano Avenue; BRP Boni Serrano (PG-111); Camp Bonny Serrano

Colonel Bonny “Boni” Merioles Serrano (4 April 1922 – 2 January 1970) also known as "Venancio" Serrano in some WWII articles (but officially listed as "Bonny Merioles Serrano" in his birth certificate), was a Filipino soldier of the Korean War in the 1950s. He received a total of 48 medals, including the Medal of Valor for extraordinary bravery, the highest honor the Armed Forces of the Philippines (AFP) can bestow. He was a member of the 10 BCT Philippine Expeditionary Force to Korea (PEFTOK): 1950–1955.

== Biography ==
Bonny Serrano was born and raised in Armenia, Uson, Masbate on April 4, 1922, to Captain Conrado Serrano who originally hailed from Batangas and wife Juanita Merioles. When the Philippine-Japanese war broke out, his father was reassigned to Bataan to resist Japanese invaders and never returned.

Coming back from the Korean War, he was the most eligible bachelor in the country. At 34, he married a Visayan singer/actress Cora Real and had three (3) children: Audie, Bonny Jr. and Johanna.

Colonel Bonny Serrano suffered a stroke on January 2, 1970.

At the colonel's wake, former President Ferdinand Marcos was said to glance admiringly at the 48 medals the colonel had in his casket and asked a journalist if it all belong to the late colonel. To which the journalist replied, "Yes, Mr. President. It was all his. He earned every single one of them".

He was buried at Loyola Memorial Park in Marikina. He was supposed to be at Libingan ng mga Bayani, but his wife chose Loyola because it is near their residence at Blue Ridge, Quezon City.

== Korean War Exploits ==
On November 5, 1950, the 10th BCT PEFTOK together with several battalions of the US forces found themselves stuck and unable to advance for several days across the Yalu River due to heavy artillery and sniper fires from the opposite side of the river by the North Korean and Chinese forces. Then 28 years old, Lt. Bonny Serrano led a five-man all-Filipino commando team on a winter night raid, swam across freezing water and captured 77 North Korean soldiers and sympathizers who thought they were surrounded by a much larger army. The "gung ho" attitude of Lt. Serrano earned him a reputation for fearlessness that made him one of the most colorful Filipino soldiers in the Korean War.

His exploits were the basis of an LVN movie, "Korea", directed by Lamberto V. Avellana and written by Ninoy Aquino starring Jaime de la Rosa and Nida Blanca. The movie was nominated for the year's FAMAS Best Picture and Best Screenplay for Benigno Aquino Jr. It won two FAMAS major awards: Best Supporting Actor for Gil de Leon and Best Supporting Actress for Nida Blanca.

== Honors and Recognitions ==
A road in Quezon City formerly known as Santolan Road was renamed to Bonny Serrano Avenue. A Philippine navy boat, BRP Boni Serrano (PG-111), and a military camp, Camp Bonny Serrano in Masbate were also named in his honor.
