= Bonny Serrano Avenue =

Road in Metro Manila, Philippines

Coordinates: 14°36′37″N 121°03′11″E

C-5 Colonel Bonny Serrano Avenue
- Santolan Road
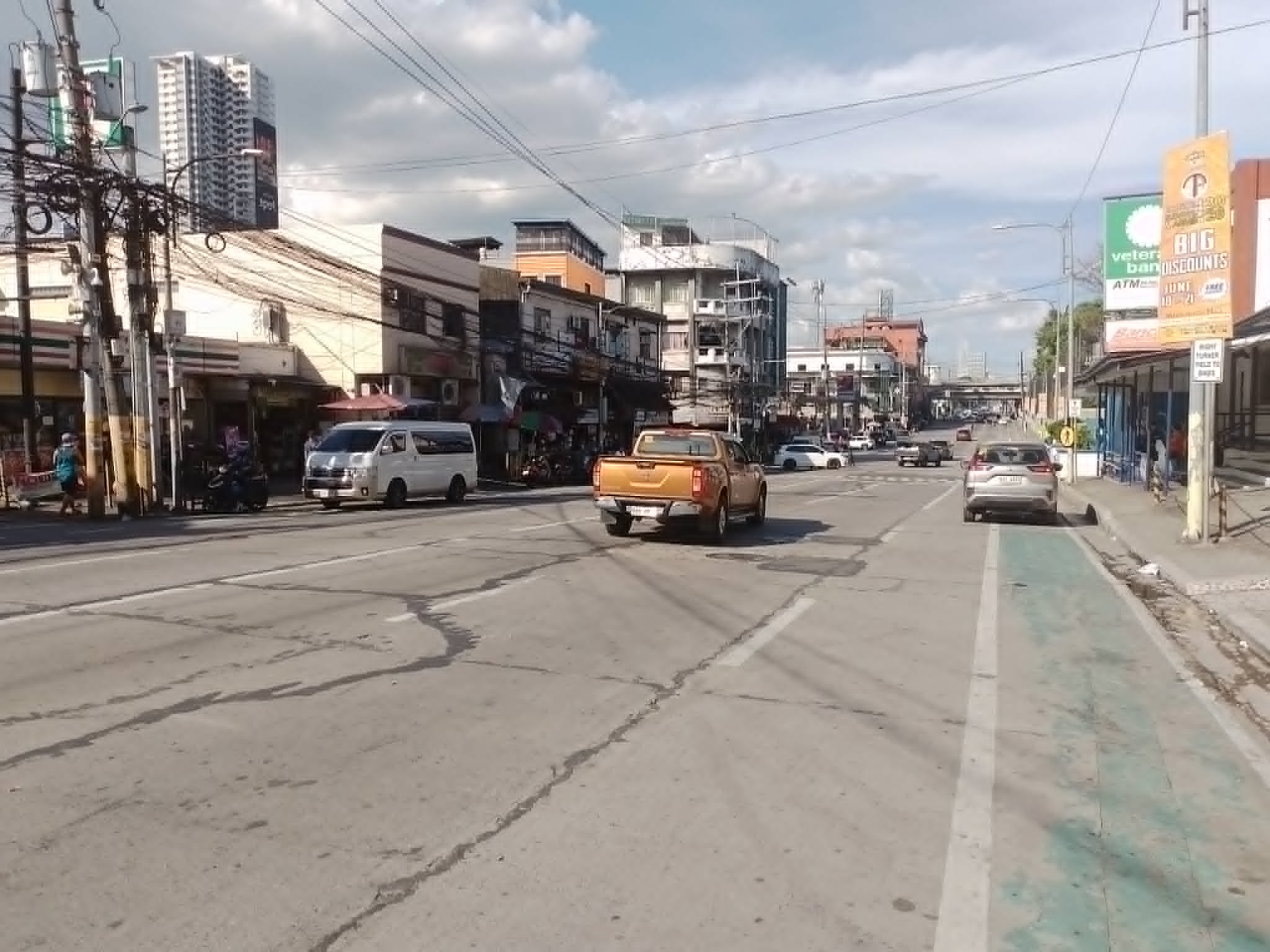
- Bonny Serrano Avenue in 2026

Route information
- Maintained by the Department of Public Works and Highways
- Length: 4.418 km (2.745 mi)
- Component highways: N185 from EDSA to Katipunan Avenue; N11 from Katipunan Avenue to E. Rodriguez Jr. Avenue; C-5 C-5 from Katipunan Avenue to E. Rodriguez Jr. Avenue

Major junctions
- West end: P. Guevarra Street / Pinaglabanan Street in San Juan
- N184 (Granada Street/Ortigas Avenue); AH26 (Epifanio de los Santos Avenue); N11 (Katipunan Avenue)
- East end: N11 (Eulogio Rodriguez Jr. Avenue) / FVR Road in Quezon City

Location
- Country: Philippines
- Major cities: Quezon City and San Juan

Highway system
- Roads in the Philippines; Highways; Expressways; List

Colonel Bonny Serrano Avenue (also spelled Boni Serrano Avenue; formerly named and still colloquially referred to as Santolan Road) is a major east–west thoroughfare in the Eastern Manila District of Metro Manila, Philippines, between San Juan and Quezon City. It was named after the decorated Korean War hero Venancio "Bonny" Serrano.

It forms the northern limit of San Juan and the southern limit of Quezon City's New Manila district. It also links the PNP headquarters in Camp Crame with the AFP headquarters in Camp Aguinaldo. The avenue runs from the border of barangays Corazón de Jesús, St. Joseph (Halo-Halo), Pasadena, and Little Baguio in San Juan to barangays Libís and Blue Ridge B near the Quezon City-Marikina border in the east. The avenue is a problematic major road that has frequent traffic jams.

== Route description ==
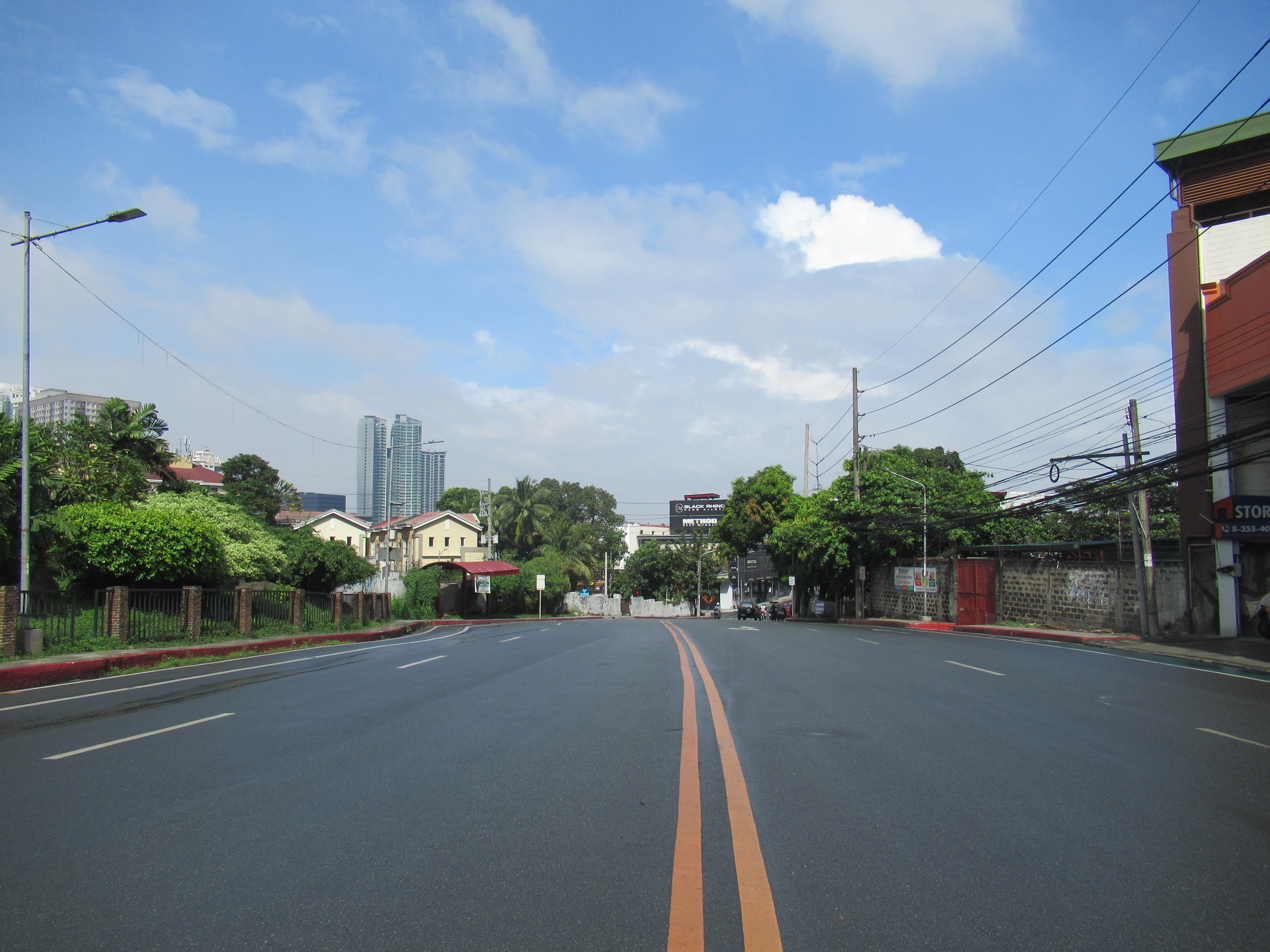
Bonny Serrano Avenue eastbound in San Juan

The four-lane avenue begins as a continuation of Pinaglabanan Street at P. Guevarra Street in Barangay Corazón de Jesús, San Juan. It proceeds due east and runs through the boundary between barangays Bagong Lipunan ng Crame in Quezon City, and West Crame in San Juan, passing by the San Juan Municipal Cemetery before arriving at the northern side of Camp Crame, where it expands to six lanes just before intersecting with 2nd Avenue. East of its junction with Epifanio de los Santos Avenue junction, the road forms the northern boundary of Camp Aguinaldo with barangays Socorro, San Roque, and Bayanihan, intersecting with 15th Avenue at Gate 1 of Camp Aguinaldo. It then intersects with Katipunan Avenue (C-5) via overpass, passing through barangays Blue Ridge A, Blue Ridge B, and Saint Ignatius before terminating at Eulogio Rodríguez Jr. Avenue (C-5) in Libis near Camp Atienza, where it continues as FVR Road to the Marikina–Infanta Highway in Calumpang, Marikina and Santolan, Pasig. This section of the avenue connecting Katipunan and Eulogio Rodríguez, Jr. Avenues is a designated component of Circumferential Road 5 (C-5) and National Route 11 (N11), while the section from EDSA to Katipunan Avenue is designated as National Route 185 (N185).

== History ==
Bonny Serrano Avenue was formerly called the Carretera de Santolan (Santolan Road), which ran from the Santolan pumping station by the Mariquina River, then in Pasig, to the El Deposito water reservoir in San Juan del Monte (now San Juan), the main source of water for Manila residents during the Spanish colonial period. It was built around 1901, during the early years of the American colonial period, costing US$150 (equivalent to $5,805 in 2025) (₱2,643). In 1935, the road, also known as the San Juan–Santolan Road and San Juan–Santolan Pumping Station Road, became the location of Camp Murphy, which eventually became Camp Aguinaldo and Camp Crame when the Philippines re-gained independence after World War II. After the establishment of Quezon City, the border of San Juan with the new city was redefined to also run along section of the road, currently between Ermitaño Creek and Camp Crame. The road was renamed after Colonel Bonny Merioles Serrano in 1970, three months after the war hero's death.

Beginning in 2019, the section from EDSA to Katipunan Avenue was widened from four lanes to six, using an area carved out of Camp Aguinaldo. It was completed in 2024.

== Intersections ==
Province	City/Municipality	km	mi	Destinations	Notes
San Juan				P. Guevarra Street	Western terminus. Continues westward as Pinaglabanan Street. Only Santolan Road is used as the name for this segment.
San Juan				J. Abad Santos Street	Eastbound to Santolan Road only
San Juan				M.J. Paterno Street, Pasadena Drive	Traffic light intersection.
San Juan – Quezon City boundary				Don Gonzalo Street	Gated community road
San Juan – Quezon City boundary				N184 (Granada Street/Ortigas Avenue)	Traffic light intersection. Access to N180 (Aurora Boulevard) & New Manila via Granada Street, AH26 (EDSA), Greenhills, Pasig & Antipolo via Ortigas Avenue. Both names of the road are in use beginning this intersection.
San Juan – Quezon City boundary				Main Horseshoe Drive	Traffic light intersection. One-way exit to Bonny Serrano Avenue
San Juan – Quezon City boundary				C. Benitez Street	Traffic light intersection. Access to Cubao via P. Tuazon Boulevard & N. Domingo Avenue.
San Juan – Quezon City boundary				Sunrise Drive	Loops back to road
San Juan – Quezon City boundary				Tyler Street	North Greenhills community road
San Juan – Quezon City boundary				5th West Crame	Doña Filomena Subdivision community road. No entry allowed.
San Juan – Quezon City boundary				4th West Crame	Doña Filomena Subdivision community road
San Juan – Quezon City boundary				3rd West Crame	One-way road as an alternate way to Greenhills, San Juan via Greenhills-West Crame Connector Road.
San Juan – Quezon City boundary				2nd West Crame	
		1st West Crame			
Quezon City				General Castañeda Street	Camp Crame Gate 3
Quezon City				1st Avenue	One-way exit to Bonny Serrano Avenue. Only Col. Bonny Serrano Avenue is the name used beginning this segment of the road.
Quezon City				2nd Avenue	One-way exit from Bonny Serrano Avenue
Quezon City				3rd Avenue	One-way exit to Bonny Serrano Avenue
Quezon City				Gen. J. Delos Reyes Street	Camp Crame Gate 2
Quezon City				4th Avenue	One-way, westbound only exit from Bonny Serrano Avenue
Quezon City				AH26 (EDSA)	Traffic light intersection. Northbound goes to Cubao & Balintawak, southbound goes to Mandaluyong & Makati. Beginning of N185 designation.
Quezon City				5th Avenue	Westbound access only
Quezon City				6th Avenue	One-way exit to Bonny Serrano Avenue
Quezon City				7th Avenue	Westbound access only. One-way exit to Bonny Serrano Avenue
Quezon City				8th Avenue	Traffic light intersection. One-way exit to Bonny Serrano Avenue
Quezon City				9th Avenue	One-way exit from Bonny Serrano Avenue. Access to Araneta City.
Quezon City				10th Avenue	
Quezon City				11th Avenue	
Quezon City				12th Avenue	One-way exit to Bonny Serrano Avenue
Quezon City				13th Avenue	Traffic light intersection. One-way exit from Bonny Serrano Avenue. Access to Araneta City.
Quezon City				14th Avenue	One-way exit to Bonny Serrano Avenue
Quezon City				15th Avenue/Delos Reyes Avenue	Traffic light intersection. No entry to 15th Avenue. Camp Aguinaldo Gate 1.
Quezon City				5th Camarilla	Westbound access only
Quezon City				6th Camarilla	Westbound access only
Quezon City				18th Avenue	Traffic light intersection.
Quezon City				19th Avenue	
Quezon City				20th Avenue	Traffic light intersection. Access to Projects 2, 3 & 4
Quezon City				Arturo Enrile Avenue	Camp Aguinaldo Gate 6
Quezon City				Pedro Martinez Street (P. Pelaez St. Extension)	Access to pedestrians only
Quezon City				N11 (Katipunan Avenue)	Traffic light intersection. Northbound goes to Commonwealth & Tandang Sora Avenues, Cubao & Marikina via Aurora Boulevard; southbound goes to Pasig, White Plains & Greenmeadows. Route changes from N185 to N11. West end of C-5 concurrency
Quezon City				Highland Drive	Westbound service road only
Quezon City				Riviera Street	Saint Ignatius Village community road. No entry allowed.
Quezon City				N11 (Eulogio Rodriguez Jr. Avenue)	No left turn from E. Rodriguez Jr. Avenue. East end of C-5 concurrency. Eastern terminus. Continues eastward as FVR Road.
1.000 mi = 1.609 km; 1.000 km = 0.621 mi: Closed/former; Incomplete access; Route transition

== Landmarks ==
Filoil Centre in 2018

This is from west to east:

=== San Juan ===
- Filoil EcoOil Centre
- Fountain International School
- Santolan Town Plaza
- White Cross Orphanage
- San Juan City Cemetery

=== Quezon City ===
- Camp Crame
- Camp Aguinaldo
  - Camp Gen. Emilio Aguinaldo High School
- Socorro Water Towers
- Libis Elementary School
