= Quirino Memorial Medical Center =

Government hospital in Quezon City, Philippines

Quirino Memorial Medical Center (QMMC)
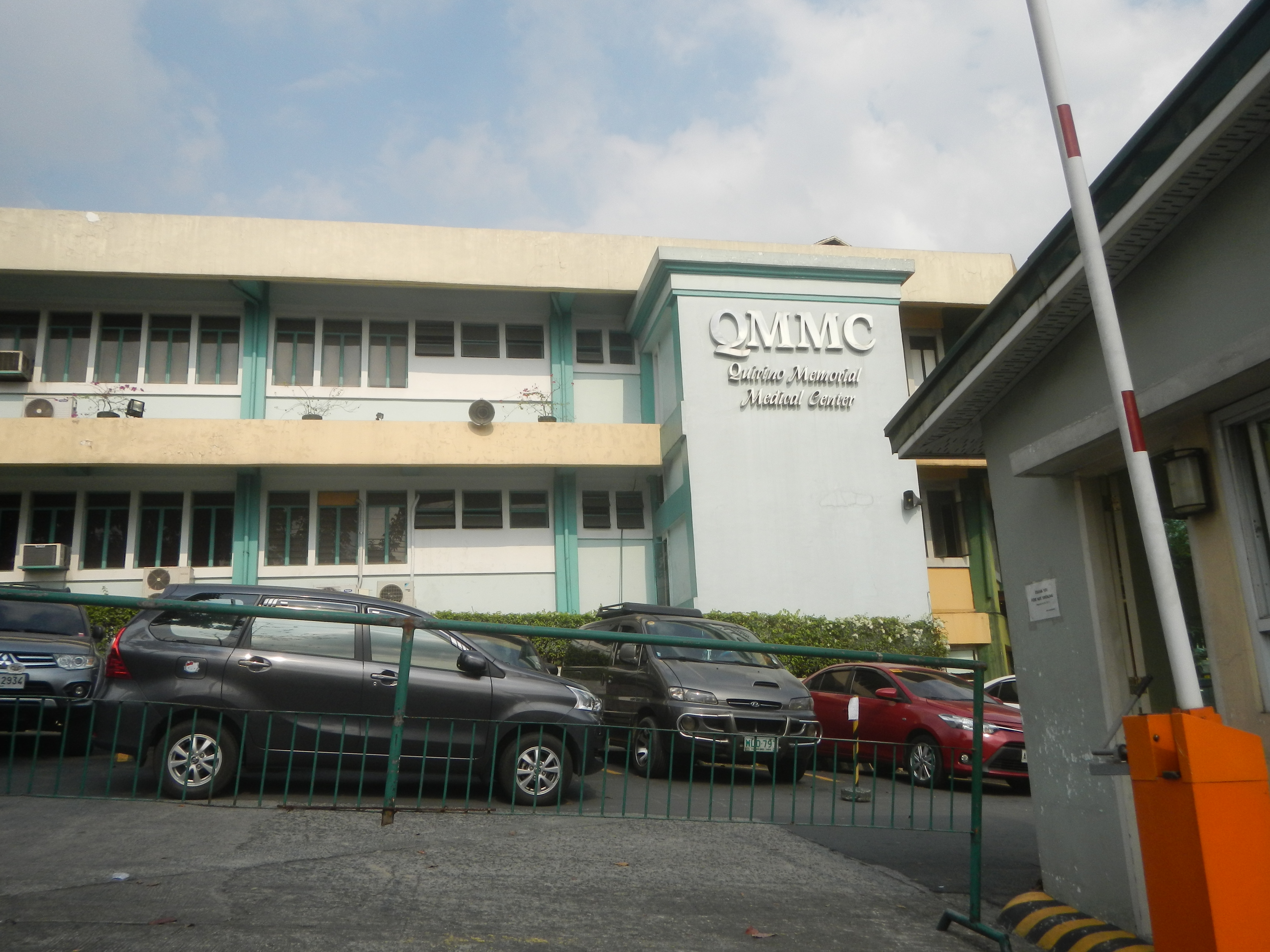

Geography
- Location: Quezon City, Metro Manila, NCR, Philippines
- Coordinates: 14°37′20″N 121°04′21″E

Organization
- Funding: Government hospital
- Type: tertiary level hospital

Services
- Beds: 500

Links
- Website: qmmc.doh.gov.ph

The Quirino Memorial Medical Center (QMMC), also called the Quirino Labor Hospital and colloquially as Labor Hospital, is a tertiary level government hospital in the Philippines with an authorized bed capacity of five hundred beds. It is located at J.P. Rizal, Project 4, Quezon City, Metro Manila.
