= NLEX Harbor Link =

Controlled-access highway in the Philippines

C-5 NLEX Harbor Link

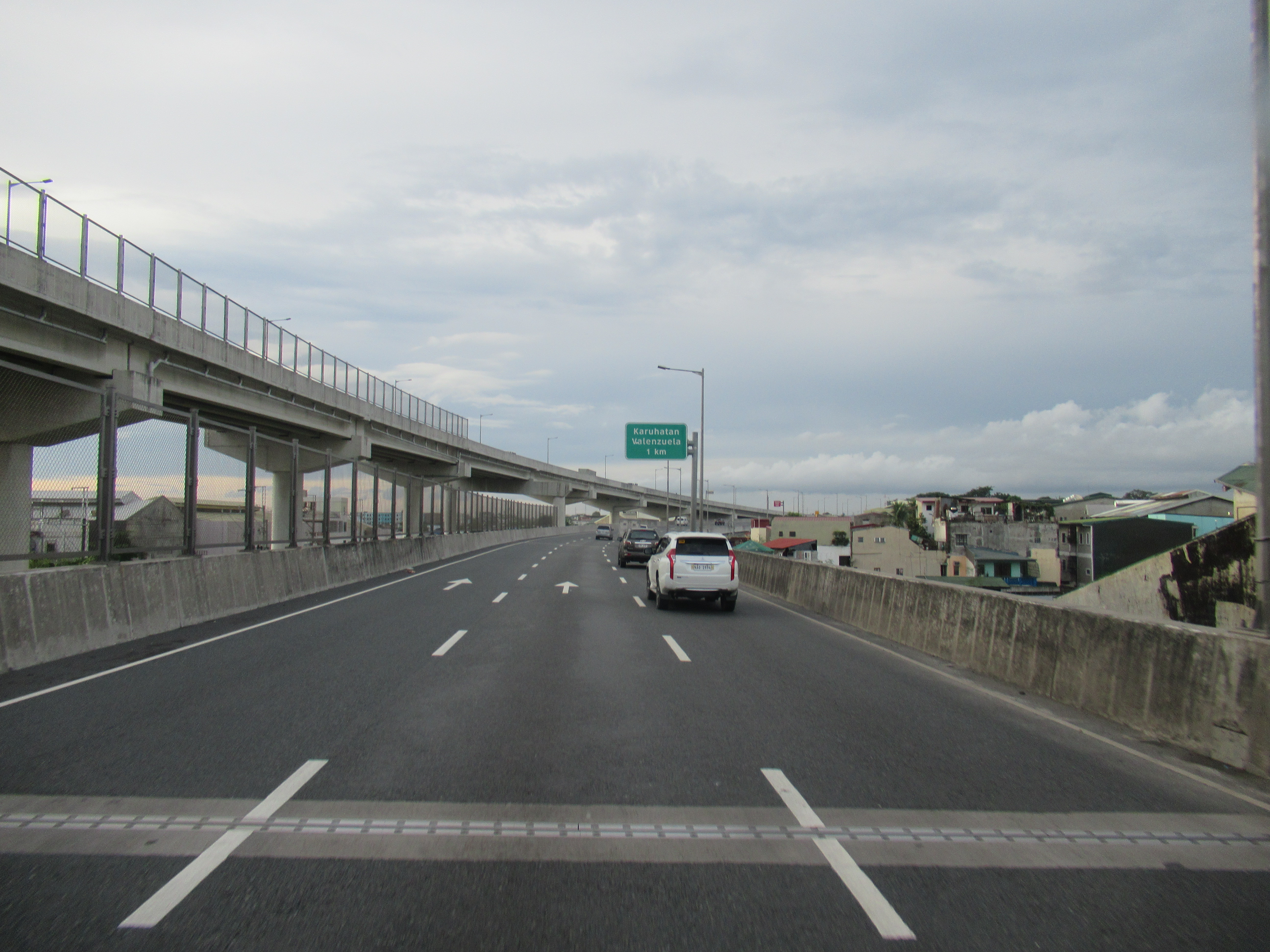
- NLEX Harbor Link Segment 10 northbound towards Karuhatan Exit in Valenzuela

Route information
- Maintained by NLEX Corporation
- Length: 24.8 km (15.4 mi) Segment 8.1 (Mindanao Avenue Link) – 2.7 km (1.7 mi); Segment 9 (Karuhatan Link) – 2.42 km (1.50 mi); Segment 10 (Harbor Link) – 8.18 km (5.08 mi) (including C-3–R-10 section); Segment 8.2 (C-5 North Link) – 11.5 km (7.1 mi) (construction pending)
- Existed: 2010–present
- Component highways: E5; C-5 C-5 from Mindanao Avenue to Karuhatan

Major junctions
- West end: AH26 (Radial Road 10) in Navotas
- N130 (C-3 Road) and E2 (NLEX Connector) in Caloocan; N1 (MacArthur Highway) in Valenzuela; AH26 (North Luzon Expressway) in Valenzuela; N128 (Mindanao Avenue) in Valenzuela
- East end: N127 (Quirino Highway) in Quezon City; Future: N129 (Katipunan Avenue) / C.P. Garcia Avenue in Quezon City

Location
- Country: Philippines
- Regions: Metro Manila
- Major cities: Caloocan, Malabon, Navotas, Quezon City, Valenzuela

Highway system
- Roads in the Philippines; Highways; Expressways; List
| ← E4 | → E6 |

The NLEX Harbor Link (North Luzon Expressway Harbor Link), (Note: The elevated highway portion above the former Philippine National Railways' tracks (Segment 10) is always named as NLEX Connector (to distinguish from the 4-lane elevated road of the same name) according to social media mentions.) also known as NLEX Phase 2, and signed as Expressway 5 (E5) of the Philippine expressway network, is a 24.8-kilometer-long (15.4 mi) elevated controlled-access highway that forms a spur of the North Luzon Expressway (NLEX), connecting it to the Port of Manila and Quezon City. The expressway runs from Katipunan and C. P. Garcia Avenues in Quezon City to Radial Road 10 in Navotas, with connections to the North Luzon Expressway in Valenzuela and Mindanao Avenue.

== Route description ==
The NLEX Harbor Link Project is an extension of the North Luzon Expressway running from Mindanao Avenue in Valenzuela at the east to Radial Road 10 in Navotas at the west, allowing access to the Port of Manila. It aims to connect with the Port of Manila while improving cargo movement between NLEX and Radial Road 10. It is divided into four segments, namely: Segment 8.1 (Mindanao Avenue Link), 8.2 (NLEX–C-5 North Link), 9 (Karuhatan Link), and 10 (Harbor Link). It forms part of the expressway's open section. Both Segments 8.1 and 9, located in Valenzuela, are components of Circumferential Road 5 (C-5) of Manila's arterial road network.

=== Quirino Highway to Mindanao Avenue ===
The operational segment of NLEX Segment 8.2 (NLEX–C-5 North Link) begins at Quirino Highway in Quezon City. It passes near the East Valenzuela depot of the Metro Manila Subway and crosses above Mindanao Avenue in Valenzuela and continues as NLEX Segment 8.1 (Mindanao Avenue Link).

=== Mindanao Avenue to NLEX main ===
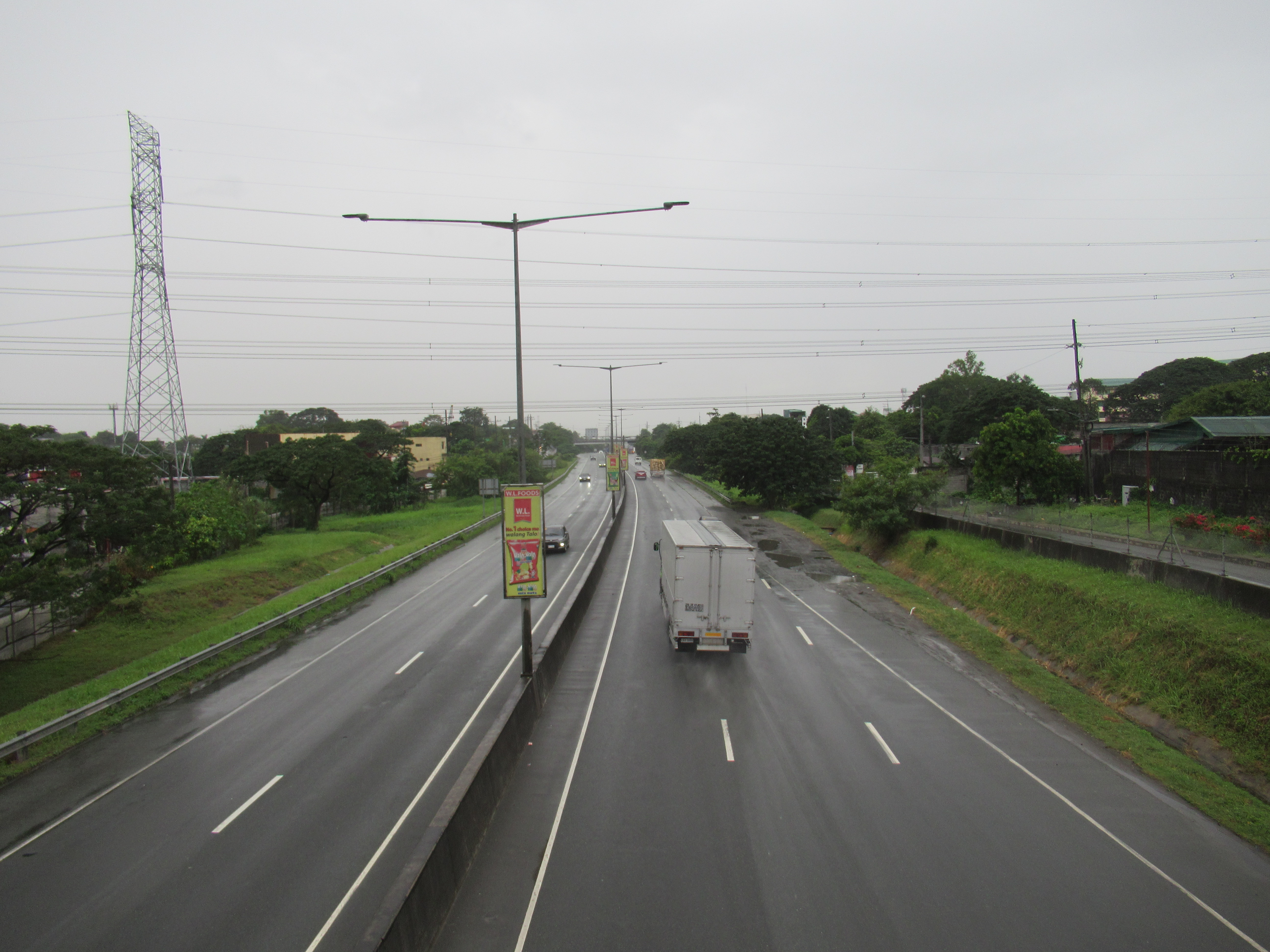
NLEX Segment 8.1 (Mindanao Avenue Link) westbound towards Harbor Link Interchange

NLEX Segment 8.1 (Mindanao Avenue Link) is a four-lane, 2.7-kilometer (1.7 mi) expressway from the Harbor Link Interchange to Mindanao Avenue in Valenzuela. Lying on the ground level east of the interchange, it begins at the intersection with Mindanao Avenue in Barangay Ugong and then approaches the Mindanao toll plazas, widening to 6 lanes serving only westbound traffic. It terminates at the Harbor Link Interchange with NLEX Main and continues to the west as Segment 9 (Karuhatan Link).

=== NLEX main to Karuhatan ===
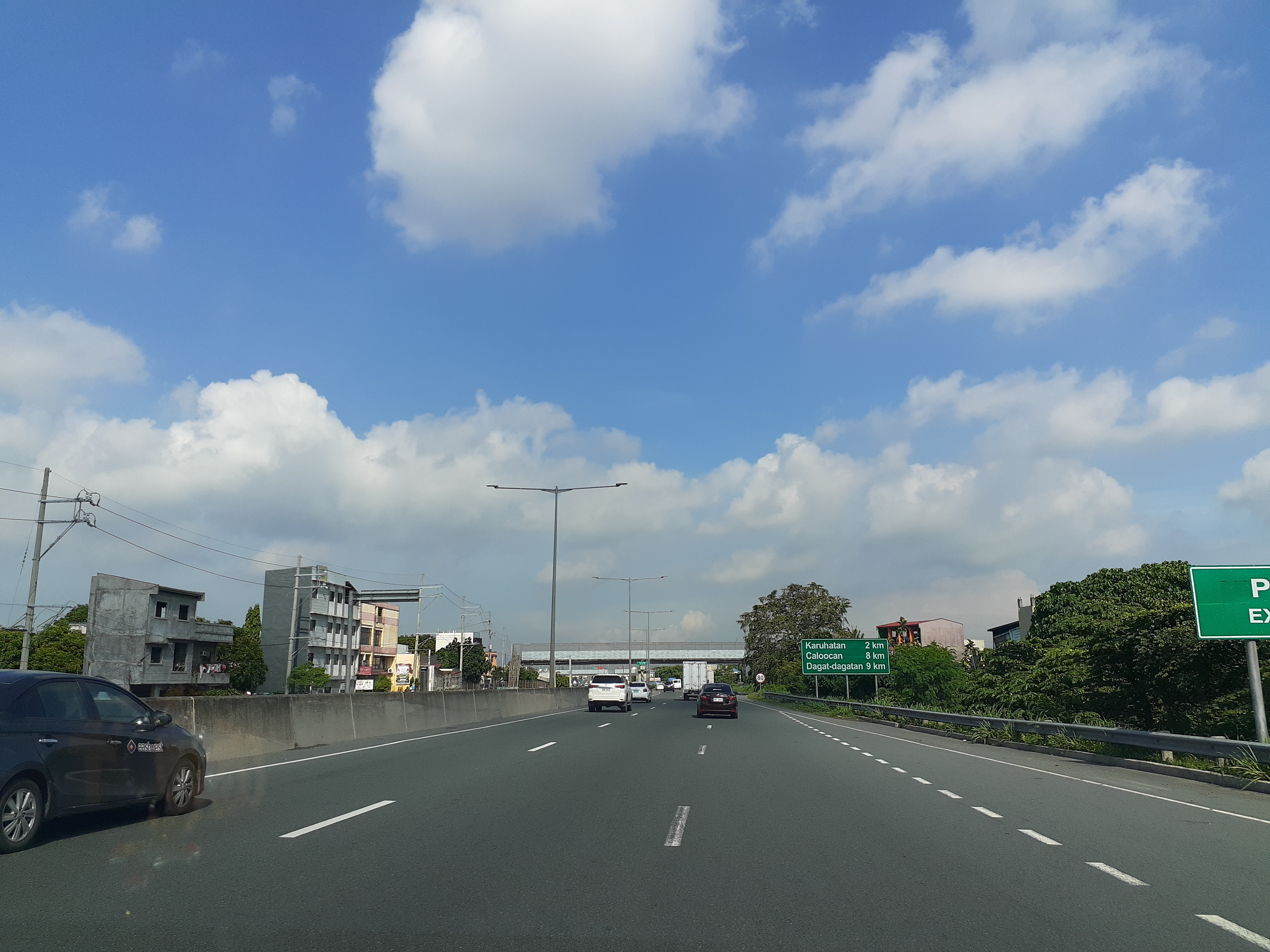
NLEX Segment 9 (Karuhatan Link) westbound

NLEX Segment 9 (Karuhatan Link) is a four-lane, 2.42-kilometer (1.50 mi) expressway from Harbor Link Interchange to MacArthur Highway in Karuhatan, Valenzuela. It is the first segment of the NLEX Harbor Link project. It begins at the Harbor Link Interchange with NLEX Main, picking up from where Segment 8.1 (Mindanao Avenue Link) left off. Lying on the ground level west of the interchange, it then traverses Barangays Gen. T. De Leon, Parada, and Maysan, where two exits towards the first two barangays, respectively, are found. It then enters Barangay Karuhatan, where it approaches the Karuhatan toll plaza, widening to 6 lanes serving only eastbound vehicles, and Segment 10 (Harbor Link) and finally terminates at MacArthur Highway.

=== Karuhatan to Navotas ===
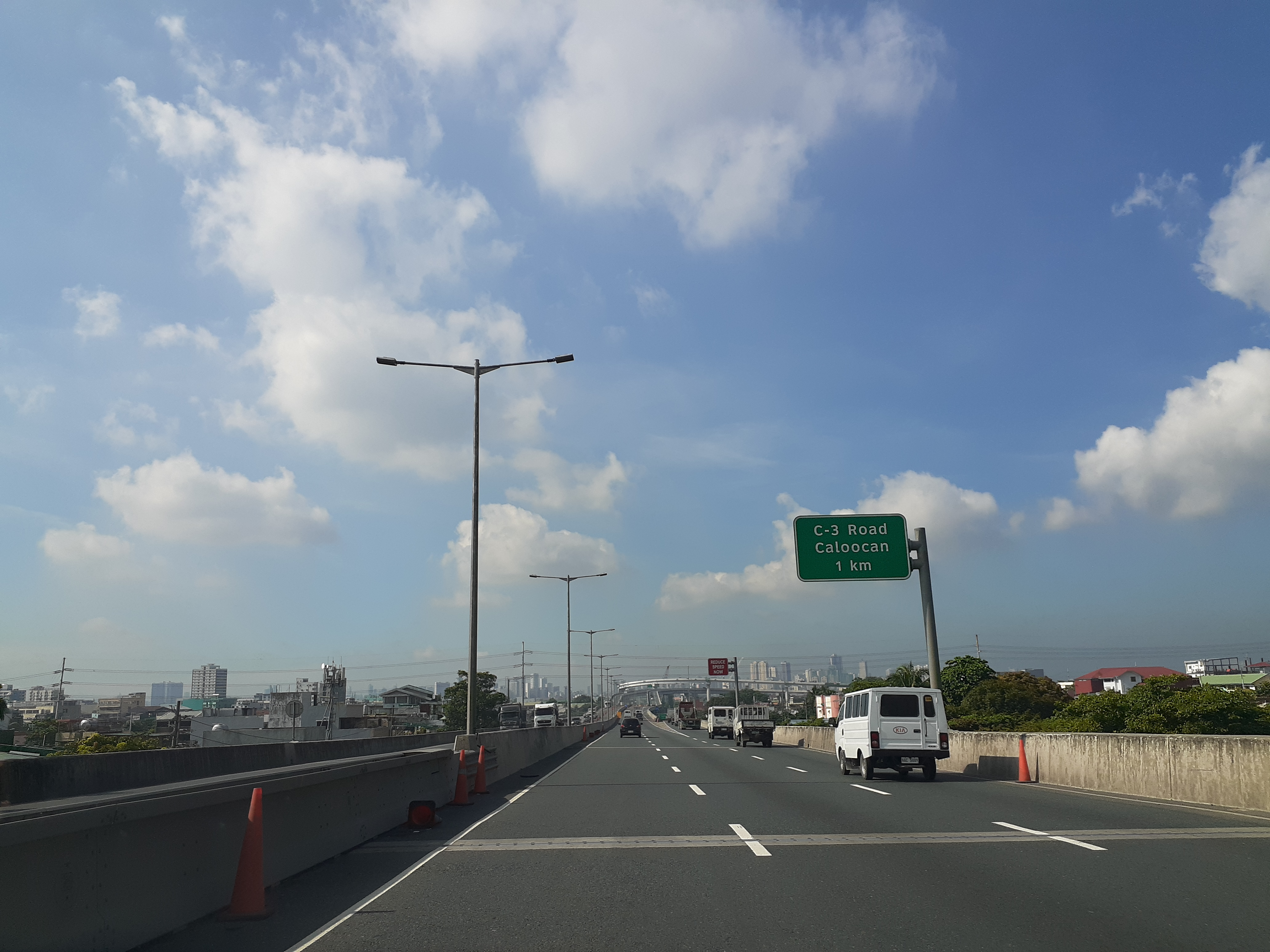
NLEX Segment 10 southbound towards Caloocan Interchange

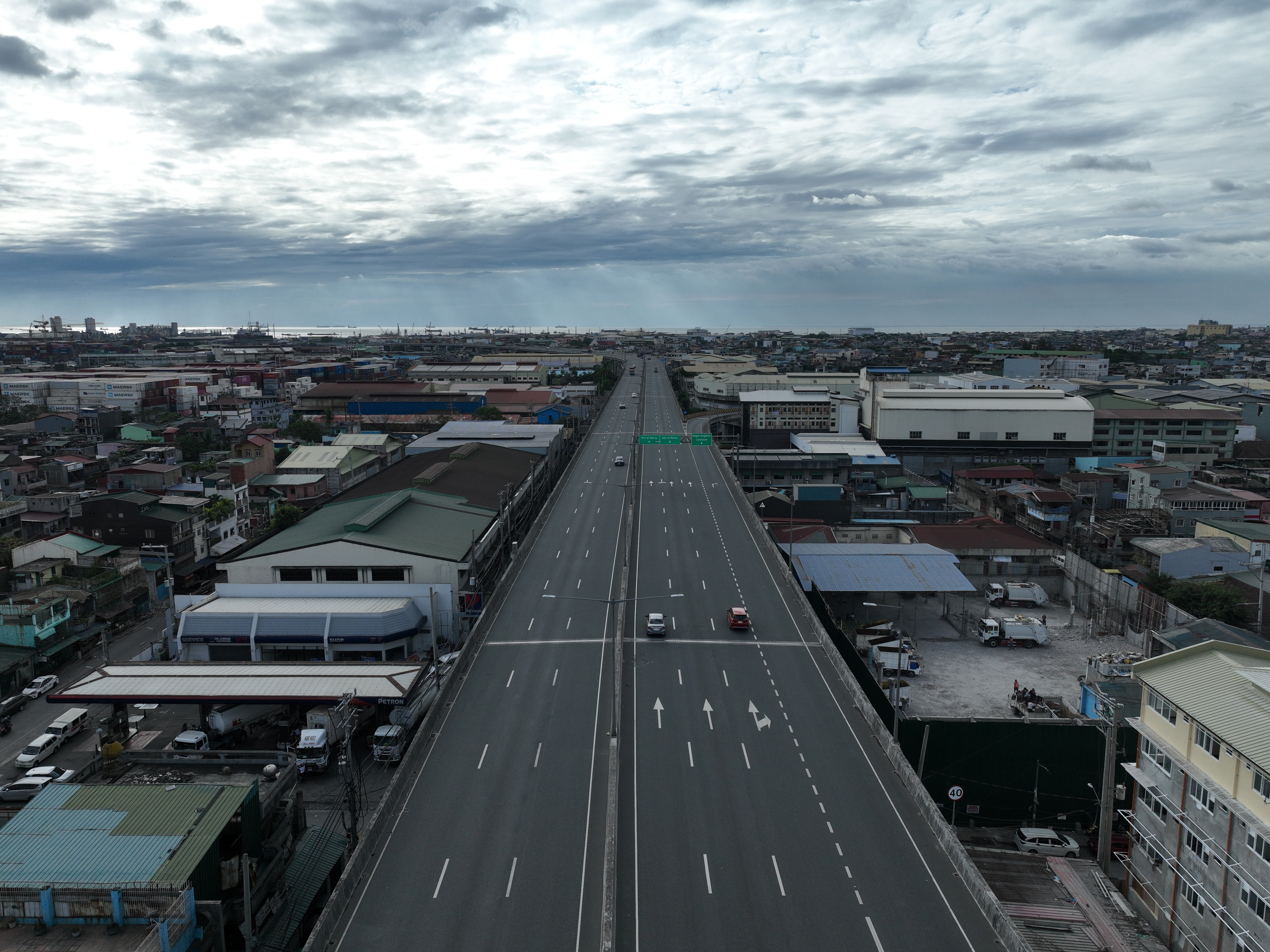
The C3–R10 section westbound in Caloocan

NLEX Segment 10 (Harbor Link), the second phase of the NLEX Harbor Link project, is a four-lane, 5.65-kilometer (3.51 mi) fully elevated expressway which connects with the Karuhatan Link (Segment 9) in Valenzuela to C-3 Road in Caloocan, where two ramps carry it to the west for another 2.60 kilometers (1.62 mi) up to Radial Road 10 (R-10) in Navotas. It begins at Karuhatan Exit with Segment 9 (Karuhatan Link) and MacArthur Highway. The section near the northern terminus traverses an industrial and residential area, which necessitated the demolition of numerous houses, buildings, and warehouses. It soon follows the railway right of way, where it rises to as high as 19 meters (62 ft) to provide necessary ground clearance for the viaduct carrying the future North–South Commuter Railway of the Philippine National Railways (PNR). This project faced conflicts because of right of way problems, resulting in only one structure being constructed. It then crosses the Tullahan River, where it enters Malabon. It then enters Caloocan, where past Samson Road and the PNR rolling stock shops in Caloocan, it shifts east of the railway's ROW, necessitating the demolition of a wet market. An exit to C-3 Road could then be found before meeting the Caloocan Interchange, where the expressway veers west as the C3–R10 spur alignment with a connection to NLEX Connector that would lead southwards to Manila. The 2.60-kilometer (1.62 mi) C3–R10 spur section, also known as the Mel Lopez Boulevard section, runs above C-3 Road, with a westbound exit to Dagat-Dagatan Avenue, crossing the Navotas River as it enters Navotas before reaching the Navotas Interchange, which connects to the Port of Manila via Mel Lopez Boulevard.

At the Navotas Interchange, the expressway has a possible future connection to the proposed Southern Access Link Expressway (SALEX) towards Manila–Cavite Expressway (CAVITEX) or New Manila International Airport, respectively.

== History ==
=== Proposal ===
According to differing versions of Frost Plan for Quezon City (the then-capital of the Philippines), an avenue was planned to connect the second National Government Center at Constitution Hill (now Batasan Hills) to both Balintawak and Manila North Road (now MacArthur Highway) in Valenzuela. This road was named Republic Avenue or Avenue of the Republic. However, the avenue was partially realized, and its right of way was eventually occupied by informal settlements. The proposal for the Circumferential Road 5 (C-5) came thereafter, with a proposed terminus by the Manila Bay in Navotas, based on a 1980 feasibility study by the Japan International Cooperation Agency.

Another study was conducted by JICA in 1993, which included a plan for an urban expressway in Metro Manila. The planned routes were included in the study. The portion of Expressway Route C-3 would start at the interchange with Expressway Route R-9 along the intersection of Andres Bonifacio Avenue in Quezon City and continue to the first segment of Expressway Route R-10 in Navotas.

In the 1999 Metro Manila Urban Transportation Integration Study (MMUTIS), JICA proposed building elevated expressways from Andres Bonifacio Avenue to Radial Road 10/Marcos Road (now Mel Lopez Boulevard) in Tondo, Manila, called the R-10/C-3 Expressway, and along Circumferential Road 5 that would have extended to Bulacan past Republic Avenue in Quezon City. In 2003, JICA conducted another study proposing the Metro Manila Urban Expressway System, which included routes along R-9, R-10, C-3, and C-5. However, none of these plans were implemented.

The proposal for the northern extension of C-5 conceptualized in the 1980 and 1999 JICA studies aimed to connect Quezon City to Navotas. In 1998, the Philippine National Construction Corporation (PNCC) signed a STOA agreement with the Manila North Tollways Corporation (MNTC, now NLEX Corporation), planning a tolled expressway from C.P. Garcia Avenue, veering into Republic Avenue in Quezon City and reaching Valenzuela. The route, initially 22.4 kilometers (13.9 mi) long, included segments of the Harbor Link and a cloverleaf interchange with the North Luzon Expressway (NLEX). The planned terminus was to be located at Letre Road in Malabon. However, it was realigned to follow the Philippine National Railways' abandoned line and ends at C-3 Road in Caloocan.

=== Construction ===
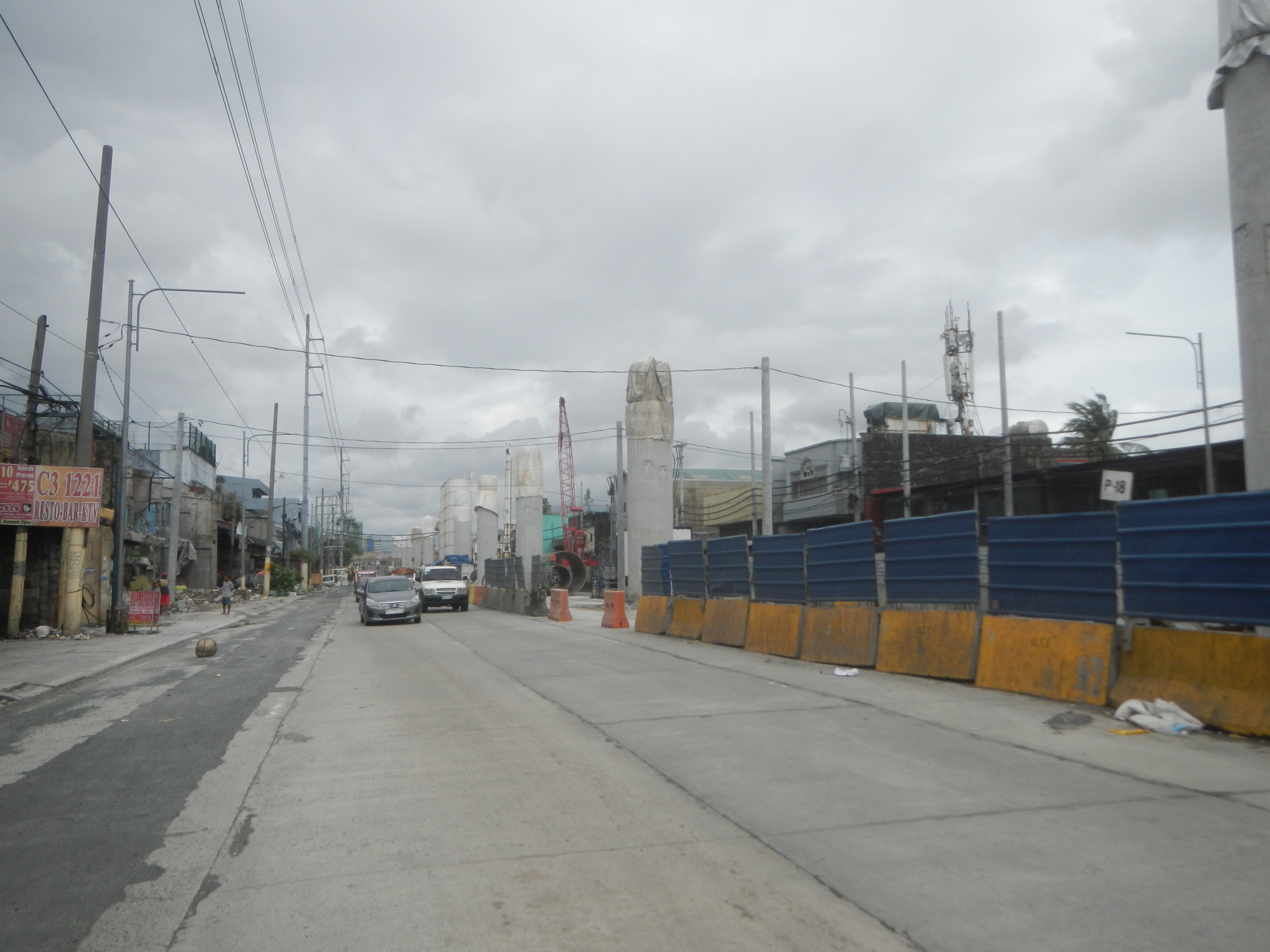
The C-3–R-10 section of Segment 10 (Harbor Link) under construction at C-3 Road, 2019

Construction of NLEX Segment 8.1 (Mindanao Avenue Link), the first segment of the Harbor Link project, broke ground on April 2, 2009, with actual construction work beginning on April 21, 2009. The right-of-way for the road and interchange were then established upon their construction, and several houses were demolished. The first segment of the project was opened to traffic on June 5, 2010, by former President Gloria Macapagal Arroyo and Metro Pacific Investments chairman Manny Pangilinan. The spur road became part of the C-5 Road North Extension and was built to provide another entry point to the expressway from Metro Manila and decongest Balintawak Interchange.

In 2013–2014, the construction of NLEX Segments 9 (Karuhatan Link) and 10 (Harbor Link) broke ground. On March 18, 2015, NLEX Segment 9 was opened, continuing Segment 8.1, running from the western side of the Harbor Link Interchange to MacArthur Highway in Karuhatan, Valenzuela.

In 2017, the works on the additional segment leading to Radial Road 10 began, while three ramps were planned as a provision.

On February 28, 2019, the main stretch of NLEX Segment 10 from MacArthur Highway to C-3 Road in Caloocan was inaugurated and opened to traffic. However, this section of NLEX Segment 10 was supposed to be operational in December 2016 but was delayed repeatedly due to right-of-way issues and delayed right-of-way acquisition. On February 21, 2020, its C-3–R-10 section was partially opened to its Malabon (Dagat-Dagatan) exit ramp. On June 15, its remaining section to Radial Road 10 was finally opened. This section was originally expected to open in March 2020 but was delayed due to the COVID-19 pandemic.

On October 29, 2026, President Bongbong Marcos inaugurated the section of NLEX Segment 8.2 (NLEX–C-5 North Link) between Mindanao Avenue and Quirino Highway.

== Future ==
=== Segment 8.2 (NLEX–C-5 North Link) ===
NLEX Segment 8.2, also named NLEX C-5 Link and NLEX–C-5 North Link Project, will be an 11.3-kilometer (7.0 mi) segment part of the NLEX Harbor Link Project that will connect the existing NLEX Segment 8.1 (Mindanao Avenue Link) to Katipunan Avenue, a part of C-5. It is divided into two sections: the 8.30-kilometer (5.16 mi) Section 1 from Mindanao Avenue to Luzon Avenue and the 3.2-kilometer (2.0 mi) Section 2 from Luzon Avenue to C.P. Garcia Avenue. The planned segment will at first run parallel to Republic Avenue before making a southward turn at a Stack interchange known as the Regalado Interchange of NLEX Segment 8.2, where this interchange will also have a provision stub for future connection with the Southeast Metro Manila Expressway and the North Luzon East Expressway, and then it will run southwards parallel to Luzon Avenue. It will then cross Commonwealth Avenue and then end at the intersection of C.P. Garcia and Katipunan Avenues. The segment will include five interchanges at Mindanao Avenue, Quirino Highway, Regalado Avenue, Congressional and Luzon Avenues, and Katipunan and C.P. Garcia Avenues.

The project implementation has been delayed for years due to right of way issues, as it will affect informal settlers in eight barangays in Quezon City. Construction of the expressway segment's first phase, particularly the 2-kilometer (1.2 mi) Section 1A between Mindanao Avenue and Quirino Highway, began in February 2025, after being awarded their contract to China Road and Bridge Corporation.

== Toll ==
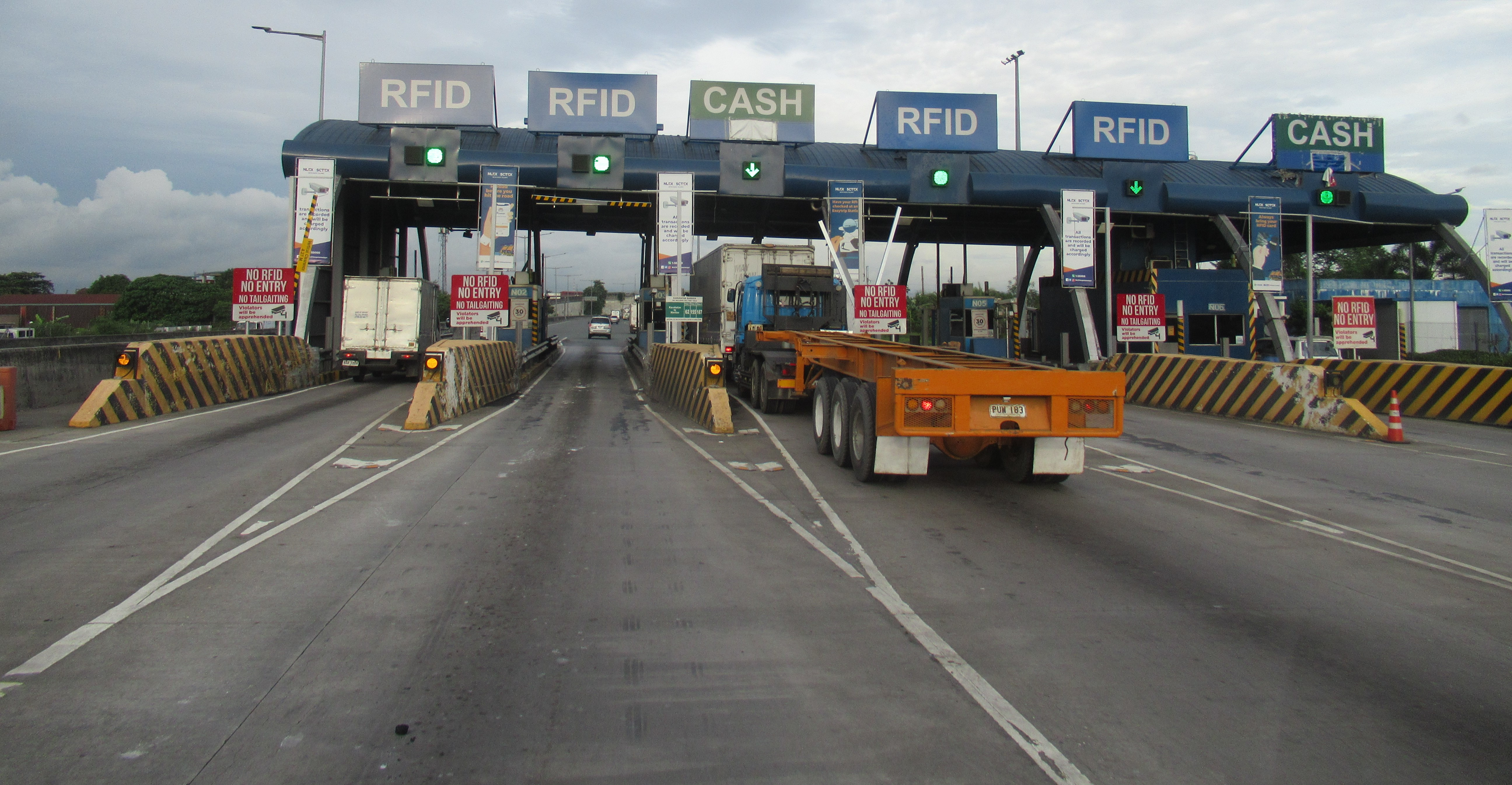
Karuhatan toll plaza on Karuhatan Link

NLEX Harbor Link is part of North Luzon Expressway's open section south of NLEX Main's Bocaue Toll Plaza in Bocaue, Bulacan. The section employs a barrier toll system, wherein vehicles are charged a flat toll based on class. Entering vehicles from NLEX Main do not need another toll collection on NLEX Harbor Link as their toll fees have already been collected at Balintawak or one of the southbound toll plazas from Bocaue to Paso de Blas. In contrast, motorists entering from other points are required to pay their toll at either the Mindanao or Karuhatan toll plazas; eastbound vehicles exiting at Karuhatan are charged a toll fee upon exit. Vehicles traveling between the C-3–R-10 section and the NLEX Connector are charged a toll fee at the latter.

It accepts cash payments and adopts the electronic toll collection (ETC) system, which is operated by Easytrip Services Corporation. Under the law, all toll rates include a 12% Value-Added Tax (VAT).

The toll rates, implemented since March 23, 2026, are as follows:

| Class | Toll |
|---|---|
| Class 1 (cars, motorcycles, SUVs, jeepneys) | ₱79 |
| Class 2 (buses, light trucks) | ₱199 |
| Class 3 (heavy trucks) | ₱238 |

== Exits ==
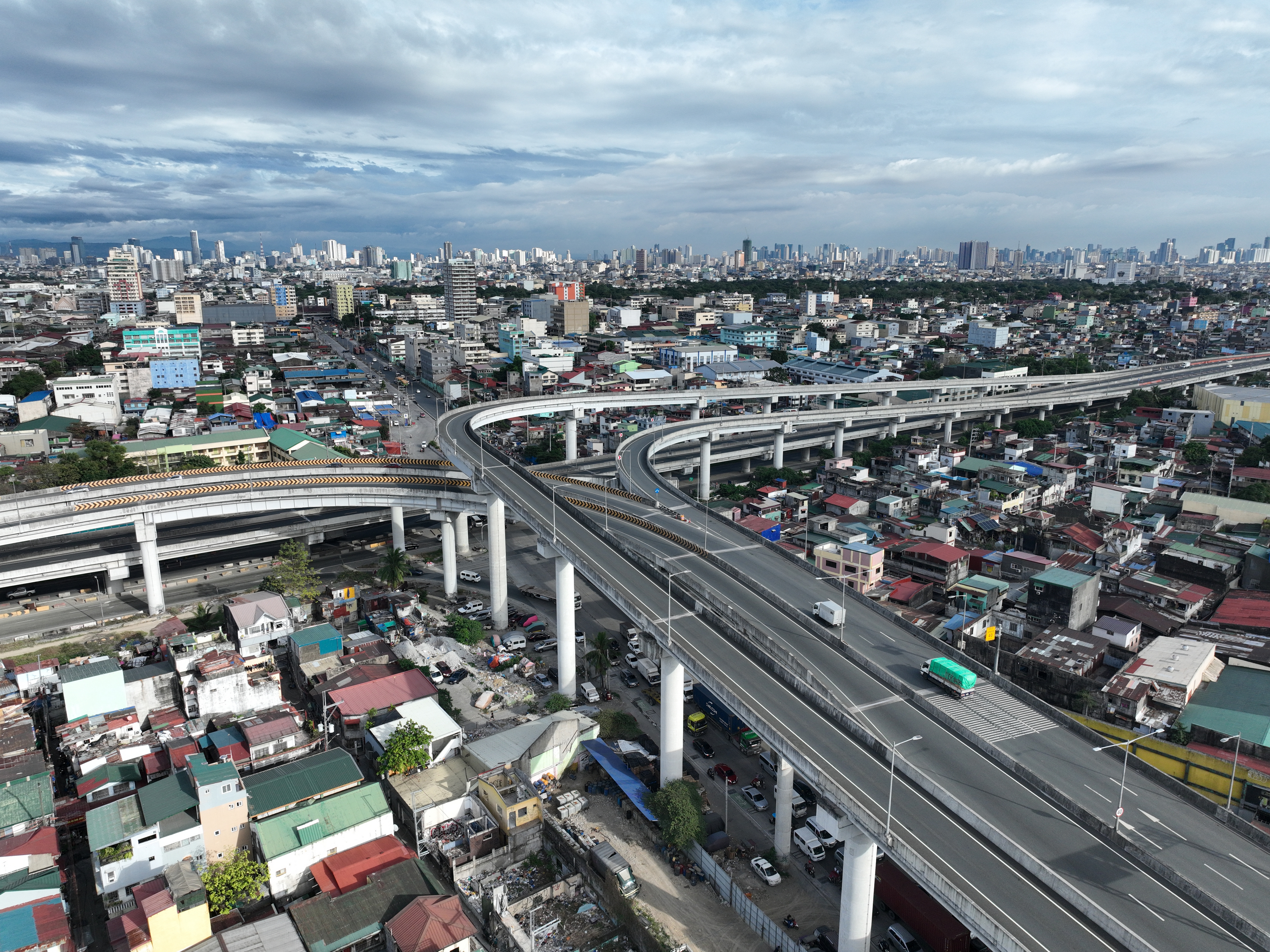
Caloocan Interchange

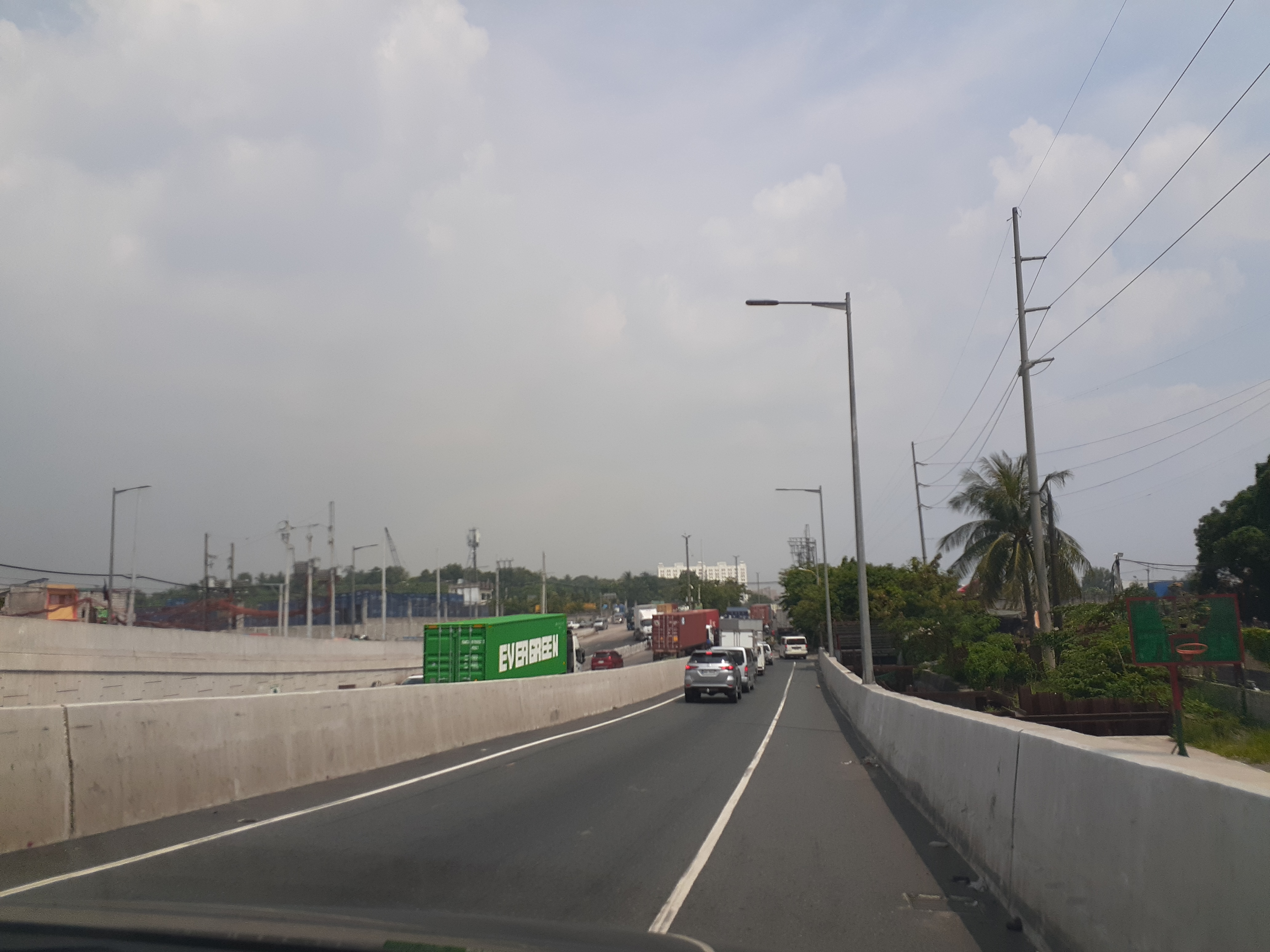
Navotas Interchange (Mel Lopez Blvd./R-10 ramp)

This entire route is located in Metro Manila. Exit numbers are numbered by kilometer posts. The kilometer count, which would be shown here in its approximate values, increments east and west of Harbor Link Interchange as it branches off NLEX Main, with Rizal Park in Manila designated as kilometer 0.

| Province | City/Municipality | km | mi | Exit | Name | Destinations | Notes |
|---|---|---|---|---|---|---|---|
| Quezon City | | | | | C.P. Garcia | N129 (Katipunan Avenue) / C.P. Garcia Avenue | Future eastern terminus; possible link to the proposed C-5 Expressway |
| Quezon City | | | | | Congressional | N129 (Congressional Avenue Extension, Luzon Avenue) | A northbound ramp connecting the northbound Commonwealth Avenue lanes to the expressway has also been proposed. |
| Quezon City | | | | | Regalado | Regalado Avenue, Republic Avenue, and Luzon Avenue | |
| Quezon City | | | | | Quirino Highway | N127 (Quirino Highway) | Diamond interchange. Current eastern terminus. Eastern end of Section 1A. |
| Valenzuela | | 15.9 | 9.9 | | Mindanao Avenue | N128 (Mindanao Avenue) – Quezon City | Current T-intersection. Future flyover diamond interchange. East end of C-5 concurrency. Former eastern terminus (2010–2026). |
| Valenzuela | | 15.39 | 9.56 | Mindanao Toll Plaza (westbound only) | | | |
| Valenzuela | | 15.29 | 9.50 | Mindanao Toll Plaza expansion (westbound only; exclusively for Class 1) (2017–2024 demolished) | | | |
| Valenzuela | | 13 | 8.1 | | Harbor Link Interchange | AH26 (NLEX Main) – Balintawak, Tarlac | Cloverleaf interchange with collector lanes; former western terminus (2010–2015) |
| Valenzuela | | 14.71 | 9.14 | | Parada | Parada, Maysan | Westbound exit only |
| Valenzuela | | 15.00 | 9.32 | | Gen. T. De Leon | Gen. T. de Leon | Eastbound exit only |
| Valenzuela | | 16.15 | 10.04 | Karuhatan Toll Plaza (eastbound only) | | | |
| Valenzuela | | 16.2– 17.5 | 10.1– 10.9 | | Karuhatan | N1 (MacArthur Highway) – Karuhatan | Diamond interchange; west end of C-5 concurrency. Former western terminus (2015–2019) |
| Malabon | | | | No major junctions | | | |
| Caloocan | | | | | C-3 Road | N130 (C-3 Road) – Caloocan | Westbound exit and eastbound entrance, former western terminus (2019–2020) |
| Caloocan | | | | | Caloocan Interchange | E2 (NLEX Connector) | Directional T interchange; veers west to C3–R10 section |
| Caloocan | | | | | Malabon (Dagat-Dagatan) | Dagat-Dagatan Avenue – Caloocan, Malabon | Westbound exit and future eastbound entrance |
| Navotas | | | | | | AH26 (R-10) – Navotas Fish Port Complex | Future westbound exit and eastbound entrance, access to Southern Access Link Expressway (SALEX) |
| Navotas | | | | | Navotas Interchange (Mel Lopez Boulevard/R10 Ramp) | AH26 (R-10) – Port of Manila | Western terminus, future connection to Southern Access Link Expressway (SALEX) |
1.000 mi = 1.609 km; 1.000 km = 0.621 mi: Concurrency terminus; Incomplete access; Tolled; Unopened

== See also ==
- CAVITEX-C-5 Link
- Southeast Metro Manila Expressway
