= Mindanao Avenue =

Major thoroughfare from Caloocan to Quezon City, Philippines

Coordinates: 14°40′19″N 121°1′55″E

C-5

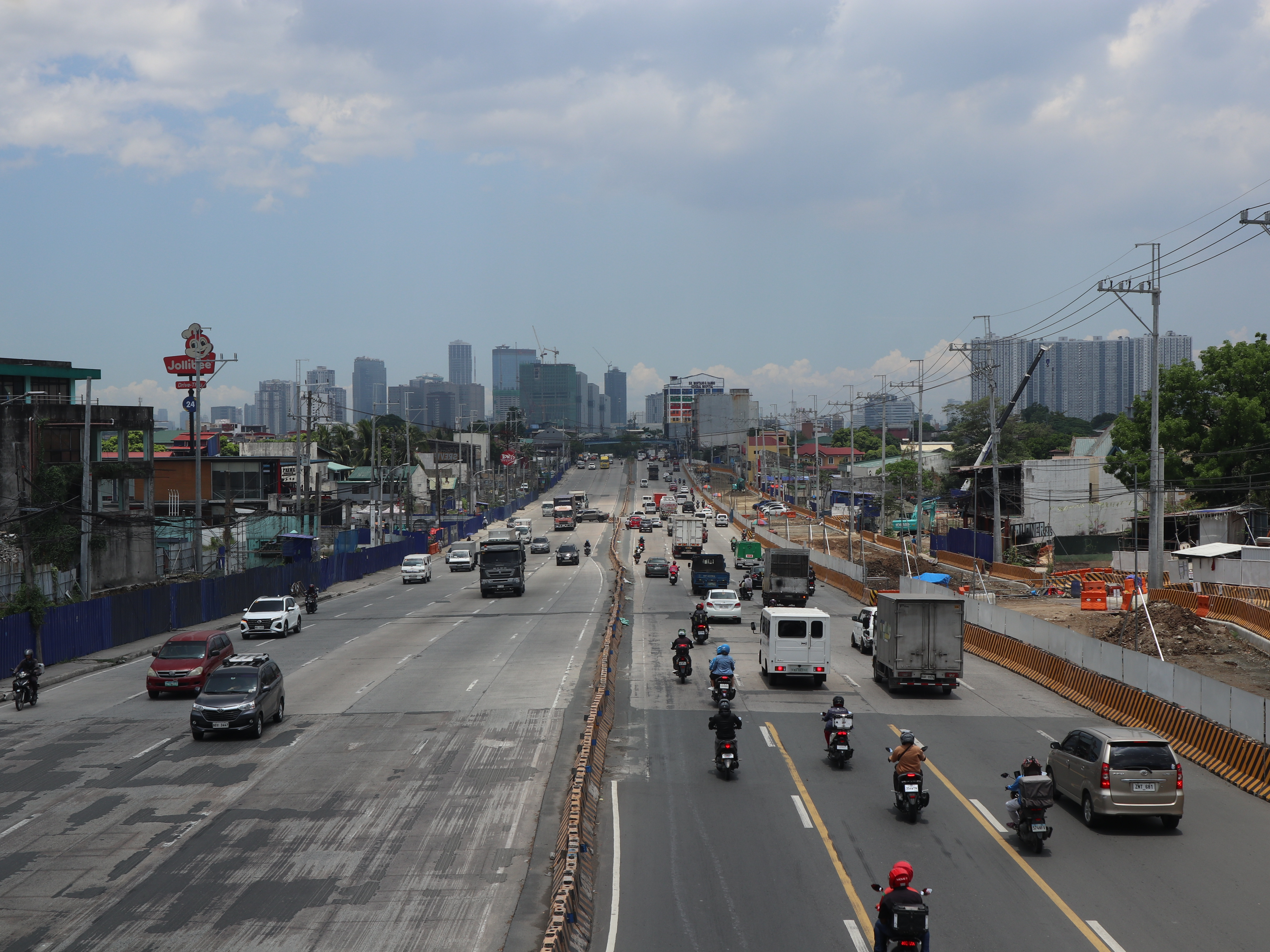
- Looking south towards Tandang Sora Avenue, during the construction of Metro Manila Subway
- Interactive map of Mindanao Avenue
- Part of: C-5 C-5 from NLEX to Congressional Avenue; N128 from North Avenue to P. Dela Cruz Street
- Namesake: Mindanao
- Maintained by: Department of Public Works and Highways - Quezon City 1st District Engineering Office and Metro Manila 3rd District Engineering Office
- Location: Quezon City, Valenzuela, and Caloocan
- North end: General Luis Street in Kaybiga, Caloocan
- Major junctions: E5 (NLEX Harbor Link) in Valenzuela; N127 (Quirino Highway) in Quezon City; N129 (Congressional Avenue) in Quezon City; N173 (North Avenue) in Quezon City
- South end: AH 26 (N1) (EDSA) in Bagong Pag-asa, Quezon City

Mindanao Avenue (Filipino: Abenida Mindanao) is an eight-to-ten-lane divided avenue connecting EDSA and NLEX and is a part of Circumferential Road 5 (C-5) in Metro Manila, Philippines. Together with Visayas Avenue and Luzon Avenue, it is one of the three parallel roads that connect Tandang Sora and Congressional Avenues; that is why it was named after the southernmost mainland of the Philippines, Mindanao. It used to be a 2-kilometer (1.2 mi) highway connecting North Avenue and Congressional Avenue, but as a part of the C-5 projects, Mindanao Avenue was extended to EDSA in the south and to Quirino Highway to the north. The new roads opened in 2000.

Another road in Quezon City, also named Mindanao Avenue, starts in Barangay Santa Monica, crosses Commonwealth Avenue and Regalado Highway, and terminates at a dead end at the School of Saint Anthony in Barangay Greater Lagro, Quezon City. That road is not connected to the original Mindanao Avenue but was planned to be the same road according to the 1949 Plan of Quezon City. It would have connected the Diliman Quadrangle to the La Mesa Watershed area.

Mindanao Avenue replaced some segments of Tandang Sora Avenue belonging to C-5; Tandang Sora has no access to the North Luzon Expressway. NLEX Segment 8.1, also known as the NLEX Mindanao Avenue Link, began construction afterwards.

In 2017, DPWH resumed construction of the 3.2-kilometer (2.0 mi) Mindanao Avenue Extension Project after it had been halted for years due to road right-of-way issues, notably involving residential areas. A total of 1.4 kilometers (0.87 mi) of the road was completed and opened in 2014. In June 2018, DPWH opened an additional 700-meter (2,300 ft) portion from P. Dela Cruz Street to the current end at MGM Road. The road will be extended until it meets General Luis Street in North Caloocan.

== Intersection list ==
Province	City/Municipality	km	mi	Destinations	Notes
Quezon City				AH 26 (N1) (EDSA)	Southern terminus. Accessible from EDSA via northbound lane only.
Quezon City				N173 (North Avenue)	Traffic light intersection. Former terminus before extension to EDSA; southern terminus of N128 designation and DPWH maintenance. No thru traffic allowed from northbound.
Quezon City				Road 1	Southbound only.
Quezon City				Alley 14	Southbound only.
Quezon City				Alley 15	Southbound only.
Quezon City				Road 8 Road 1	Both roads accessible on either side via U-Turn slots.
Quezon City				Road 3 Road 16	Both roads accessible on either side via U-Turn slots.
Quezon City				Cattleya Street	Both segments accessible via U-Turn slots.
Quezon City				Bongavilla Street	Northbound only.
Quezon City				N129 (Congressional Avenue)	Traffic light intersection. South end of C-5 concurrency
Quezon City				Calla Lily Street	Northbound only.
Quezon City				Road 20	Both segments accessible via U-Turn slots.
Quezon City				Tandang Sora Avenue	Both segments accessible via U-Turn slots.
Quezon City				Rosal Street	Northbound only.
Quezon City				Ruby Street	Southbound only.
Quezon City				Longines Street	Northbound only.
Quezon City				Saint Charbel Street	Southbound only.
Quezon City				Don Jose Street	Northbound only.
Quezon City				Rosal Street	Southbound only.
Quezon City				Don Vicente Street	Northbound only.
Quezon City				Science Road	Northbound only.
Quezon City				Old Sauyo Road	Both segments accessible via U-Turn slots.
Quezon City				South end of Mindanao Avenue Tunnel	
Quezon City				Champaca Street	Both segments accessible via U-Turn slots.
Quezon City				N127 (Quirino Highway)	Former terminus.
Quezon City				Palmera Street	Northbound only.
Quezon City				North end of Mindanao Avenue Tunnel	
Quezon City				Oliva Road, Magnolia Street; Sabila Street, Socorro Street	Southbound only.
Quezon City				Biglang-Awa Street	Northbound only.
Valenzuela				Maya Street	Southbound only.
Valenzuela				E5 (NLEX Harbor Link)	Traffic light intersection. North end of C-5 concurrency
Valenzuela				Darlucio Street; B. Juan Street	Both roads accessible via U-Turn slots.
Valenzuela				Lazaro Street	Southbound only.
Valenzuela				Tatalon Street	Southbound only.
Valenzuela				P. Dela Cruz Street	Northbound only. Northern terminus of N128 designation.
Valenzuela				Sto. Rosario Street	Southbound only.
Caloocan				MGM Road	Current terminus for trucks.
Caloocan				N118 (General Luis Street)	Partially opened for light vehicles only as of September 4, 2024. Construction still ongoing.
1.000 mi = 1.609 km; 1.000 km = 0.621 mi: Concurrency terminus; Incomplete access; Route transition; Unopened

== Landmarks ==
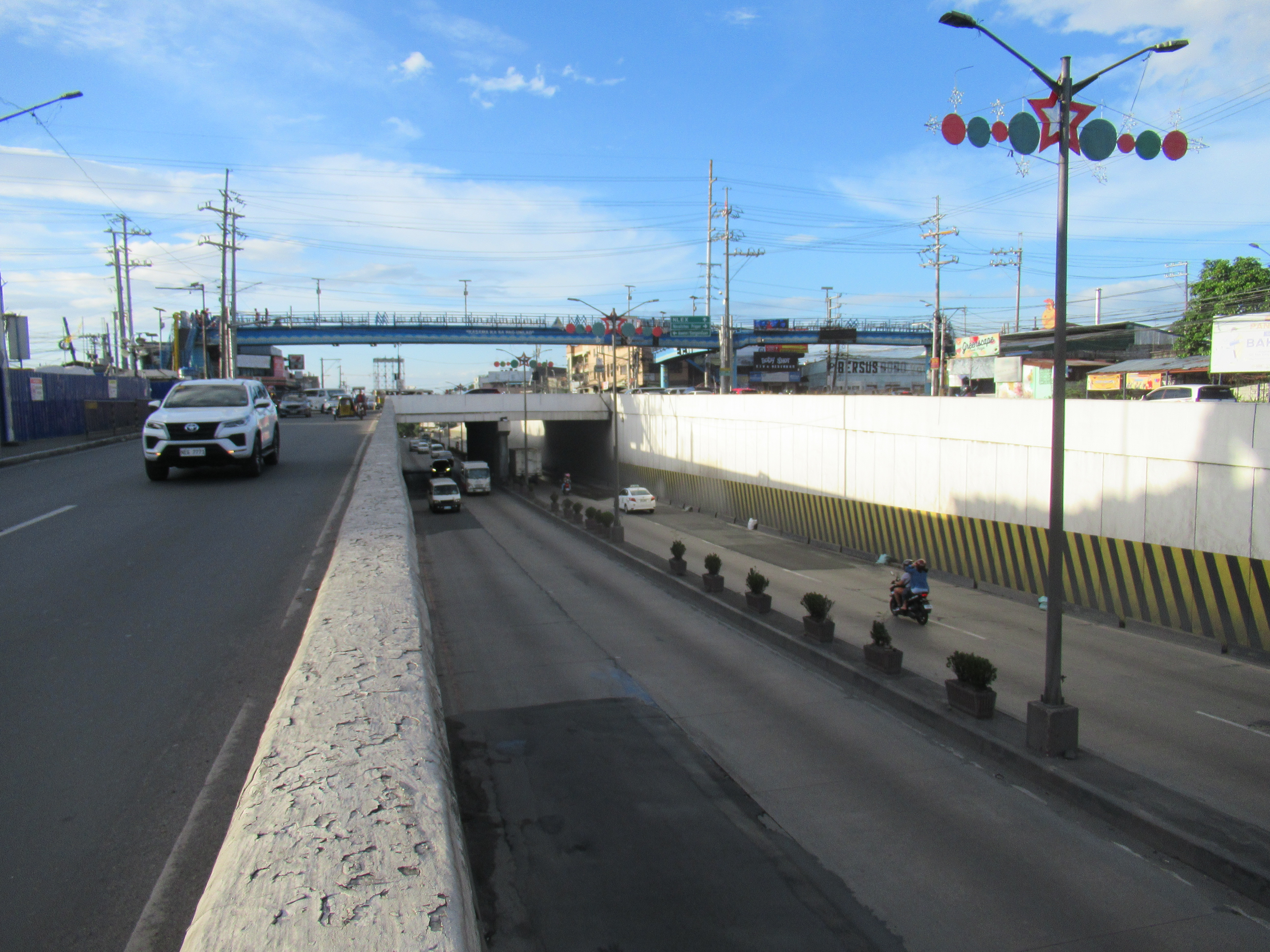
Mindanao Avenue Tunnel crossing Quirino Highway

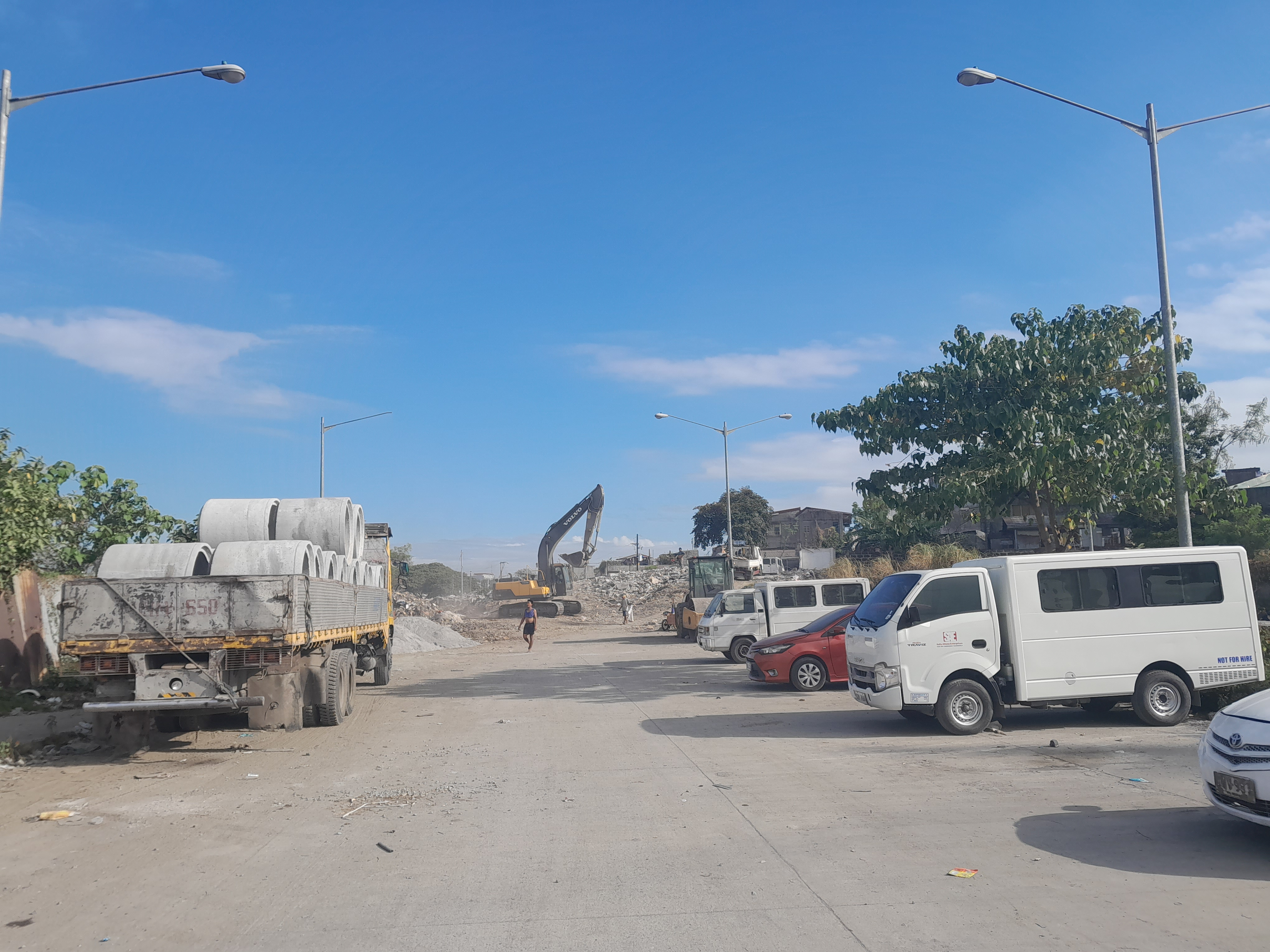
Ongoing construction of Mindanao Avenue Extension towards to General Luis Street as of March 2023

This is from south to north:

=== Quezon City ===
- Trinoma/MRT Line 3 Depot
- Veterans Memorial Medical Center
- Culiat Bridge IV (Culiat River)
- Pasong Tamo Bridge (San Juan River)
- Our Lady of the Annunciation Parish
- Mindanao Bridge I (Diliman Creek)
- Mindanao Bridge III (Tullahan River)
- Metro Manila Subway Depot

=== Valenzuela ===
- NLEX Harbor Link exit
- East Valenzuela subway station

=== Caloocan ===
- General Luis Street

== See also ==
- Circumferential Road 5, designation from NLEX Harbor Link to Congressional Avenue
- Media related to Mindanao Avenue (Quezon City) at Wikimedia Commons
