= General Luis Street =

Road in Metro Manila, Philippines

Coordinates: 14°43′10″N 121°01′32″E

General Luis Street
- Polo-Novaliches Road
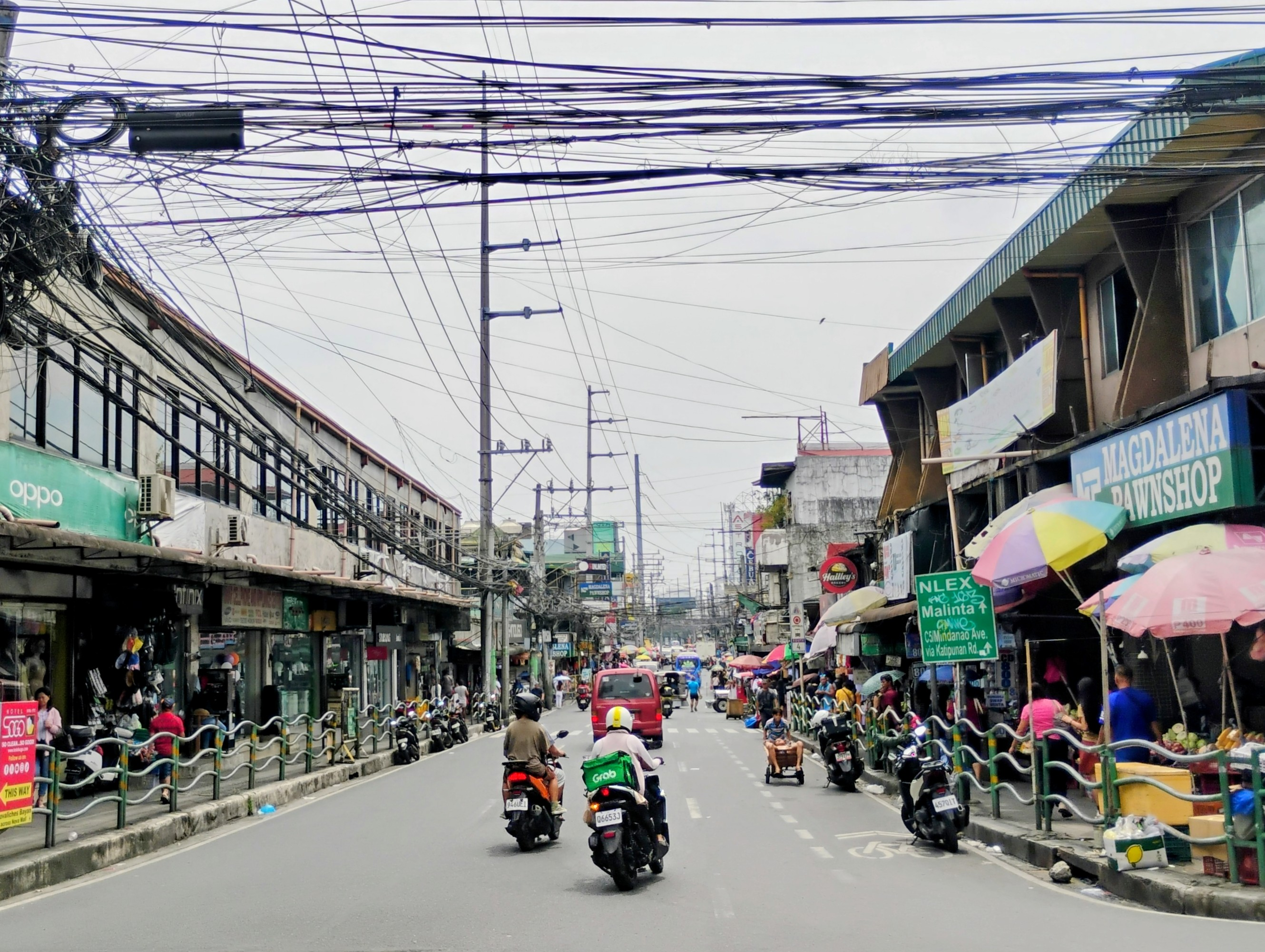
- General Luis Street in Novaliches Proper, Quezon City

Route information
- Maintained by the Department of Public Works and Highways
- Length: 4.502 km (2.797 mi)

Major junctions
- West end: ITC Road in Bagbaguin, Valenzuela
- P. Jacinto Street; Mindanao Avenue Extension; P. Dela Cruz Street; Diamond Road; Katipunan Avenue Extension; Damong Maliit Road; Pasacola Road
- East end: N127 (Quirino Highway) / Susano Road in Novaliches Proper, Quezon City

Location
- Country: Philippines
- Major cities: Valenzuela, Caloocan, Quezon City

Highway system
- Roads in the Philippines; Highways; Expressways; List
← N117	→ N119

General Luis Street is a two-to-four lane, major east-west thoroughfare running through Valenzuela, North Caloocan and Quezon City. Heavy traffic is usually expected when traversing this road due to the concentration of tricycles and jeepneys, commercial establishments, warehouses and factories along and near the vicinity. However, there have been multiple plans to alleviate traffic congestion, such as obstruction removal, road widening and improvement, and construction of additional roads like the Mindanao Avenue extension.

== Name ==
Once called the Polo-Novaliches Road, it connects the towns of Novaliches (now mostly part of Quezon City) and Polo (now Valenzuela). This segment of the road was renamed after one of Andrés Bonifacio's most trusted revolutionaries, General Luis Malinis, who was killed during the Battle of Novaliches in November 1896. Its segment in Caloocan is also known as Kaybiga Road, apparently after the area of the same name that it traverses there.

== Route description ==
The road starts at the intersection with Susano Road and Quirino Highway in Novaliches Proper (Novaliches Bayan), passing through various residential subdivisions, factories, and warehouses. After passing through Mendoza Compound, it crosses the border to Kaybiga, part of North Caloocan. The road then slopes down and meets ITC Road, which continues towards Valenzuela as Bagbaguin Road.

== Intersections ==
Province	City/Municipality	km	mi	Destinations	Notes
Quezon City				N127 (Quirino Highway), Susano Road	Eastern terminus. Access to Balintawak and Fairview/Lagro via Quirino Highway, Camarin and Deparo via Susano Road.
Quezon City				Austria Street	
Quezon City				Buenamar Drive	Vehicles approaching Quirino Highway and Susano Road are forced to take a right turn at this intersection. Only vehicles coming from the junction are allowed to pass beyond this part of the road.
Quezon City				Gold Street	Alternate access to Susano Road.
Quezon City				Doña Rosario Avenue	Alternate route to Quirino Highway and SB Road.
Quezon City				Ambrosia Street	
Quezon City				Reynaldo Street	
Quezon City				Luisito Street	
Quezon City				Elenita Street	
Quezon City				Pasacola Road	Part of SB Road, an alternate road leading to Holy Cross in San Bartolome and Mindanao Avenue.
Quezon City				Damong Maliit Road	Access to Bagumbong, Deparo & Llano in Caloocan, and Bignay in Valenzuela.
Quezon City				East Street	
Quezon City				Villa Nova Avenue	Gated community road. Alternate access to Damong Maliit Road.
Quezon City				Banahaw Street	
Quezon City				Pascual Street	
Quezon City				Walter Road	
Quezon City				Rebisco Road	
Quezon City				A. Samonte Road	Loops back to General Luis Street. Alternate access to Katipunan Avenue.
Quezon City				Basa Street	
Quezon City				A. Samonte Road	Alternate access to Katipunan Avenue.
Quezon City				Katipunan Avenue Extension	Access to Mindanao Avenue.
Quezon City				Reliance Street	
Quezon City				Mendoza Compound	
Caloocan				Silver Road	Caloocan Industrial Subdivision
Caloocan				San Ildefonso Road	
Caloocan				Diamond Road	Caloocan Industrial Subdivision. Access to Bagumbong, Deparo & Llano in Caloocan.
Caloocan				P. Dela Cruz Street	Alternate route to NLEX and Mindanao Avenue.
Caloocan				N128 (Mindanao Avenue Extension)	Partially opened for light vehicles only. Construction still ongoing. Access to E5 (NLEX Mindanao Avenue Link).
Caloocan				Vista Verde Avenue	Gated community road. Alternate access to Bignay, Punturin & Lawang Bato in Valenzuela; Llano in Caloocan.
Caloocan				NPC Road	
Caloocan				Ramirez Compound	
Caloocan				Santiago Street	
Caloocan				P. Jacinto Street	Access to Lawang Bato & Punturin in Valenzuela.
Caloocan				Gemini Street	
Caloocan				Dalag Compound	
Valenzuela				ITC Road	Continues westward as Bagbaguin Road. Access to E1 (NLEX Paso de Blas Exit).
1.000 mi = 1.609 km; 1.000 km = 0.621 mi: Incomplete access
