= Maysan Road =

Road in Valenzuela, Philippines

Coordinates: 14°41′39″N 120°58′09″E

- Malinta–Maysan–Paso de Blas–Bagbaguin Road; Kaybiga Road; Polo-Novaliches Road
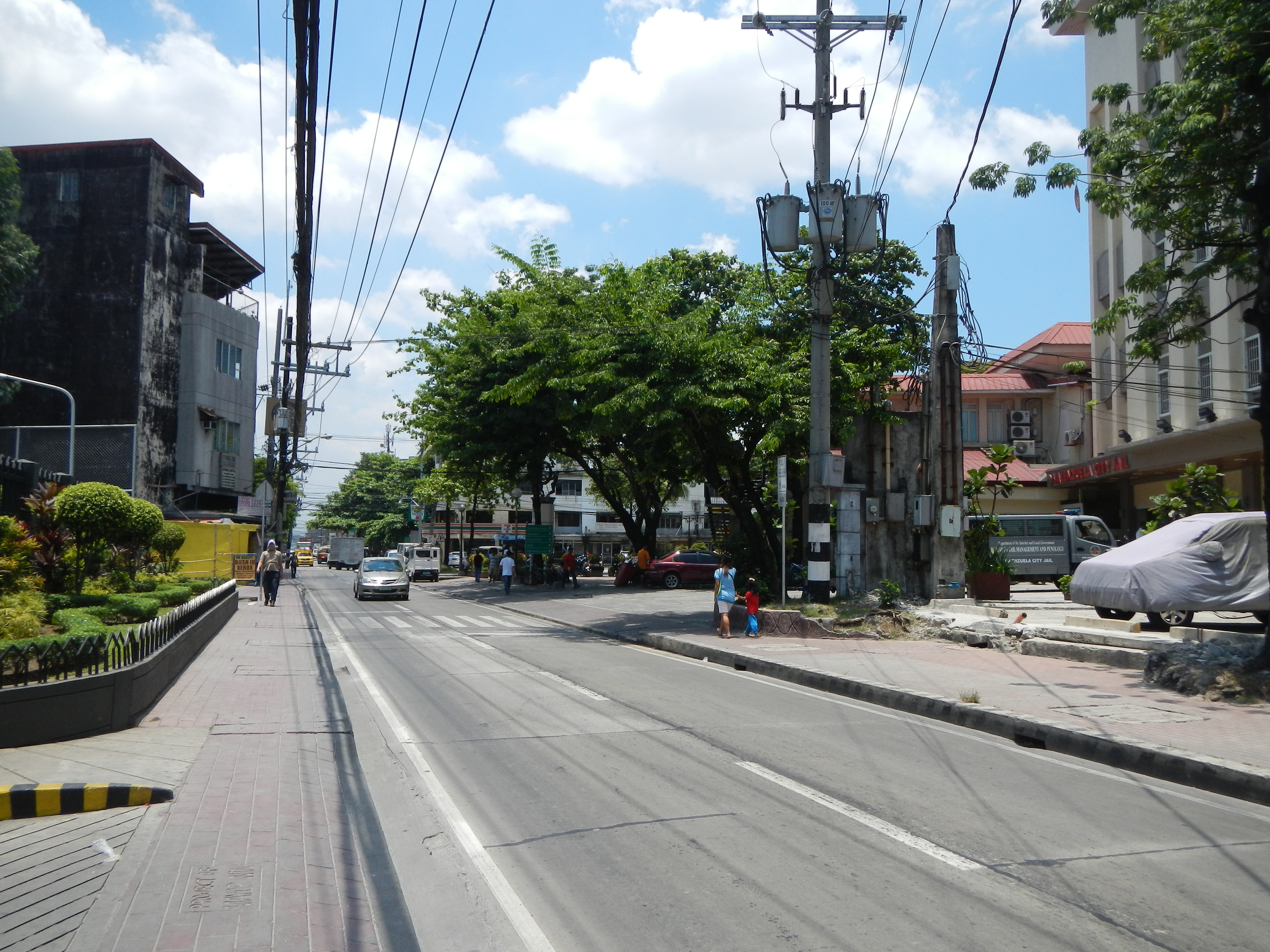
- Maysan Road in Malinta
- Interactive map of Maysan Road
- Maintained by: Department of Public Works and Highways
- Length: 4.5 km (2.8 mi); Approximate length
- Component highways: N118
- Location: Valenzuela and Caloocan
- West end: N1 (MacArthur Highway) in Valenzuela
- Major junctions: AH 26 (E1) (North Luzon Expressway)
- East end: N118 (General Luis Street) / ITC Compound Road at Valenzuela–Caloocan boundary

Maysan Road is one of the main east–west thoroughfares of Valenzuela, Philippines. It is a narrow street with only one lane in each direction, making it one of the most congested streets in northern Metro Manila. It runs for approximately 4.5 kilometers (2.8 mi) from MacArthur Highway in barangay Malinta, past the North Luzon Expressway intersection, into North Caloocan. The road connects the central Valenzuela barangays of Malinta, Maysan, Paso de Blas, and Bagbaguin. It was the main access road for vehicles going to Valenzuela and the Manila North Harbor from the North Luzon Expressway before the construction of NLEX Segment 9 (NLEX Karuhatan Link), which parallels it to the south.

== Name ==
The street is named after the barangay it traverses near MacArthur Highway. Maysan, in turn, comes from the Filipino word "maisan", which means "corn field". It is also known by different names depending on the barangay it goes through, such as Paso de Blas Road in Paso de Blas and Bagbaguin Road in Bagbaguin. It is also sometimes called Malinta Road, as it originates in Barangay Malinta and goes to and from the North Luzon Expressway's Paso De Blas Interchange (formerly Malinta Interchange).

== Route description ==
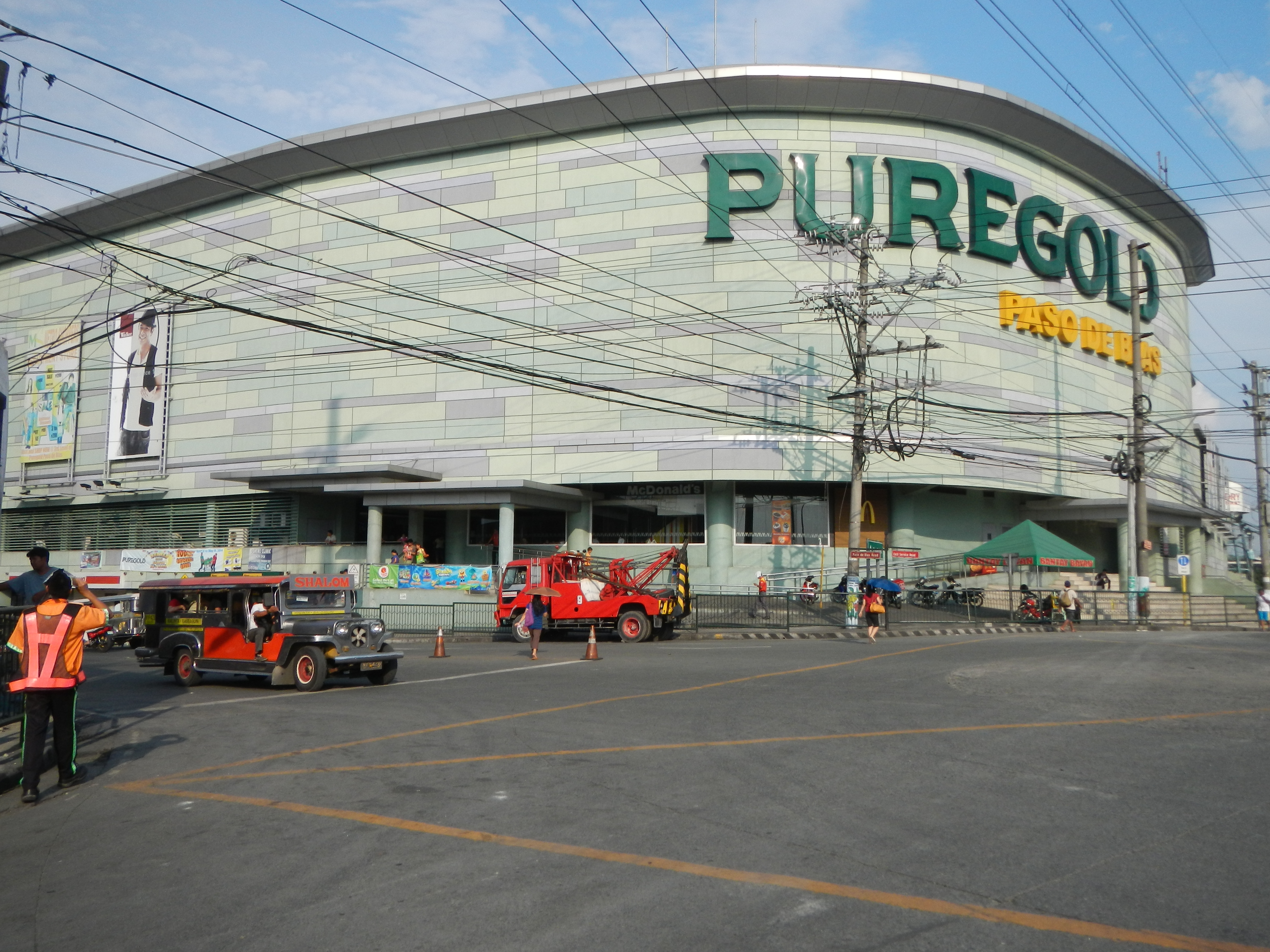
Puregold Paso de Blas near NLEX Paso de Blas Interchange

Maysan Road commences at MacArthur Highway in downtown Valenzuela, where the Valenzuela City Hall, the Pamantasan ng Lungsod ng Valenzuela and the old Valenzuela station are located. It heads east and enters barangay Maysan, passing St. Louis College of Valenzuela, Tierra Santa Memorial Park, and Maysan Elementary School. At Paso de Blas, the road intersects with T. Santiago Street and heads for the Paso de Blas Interchange of the North Luzon Expressway (NLEX). Located near this interchange is Puregold Paso de Blas (former Royal Family Mall). Between the East Service Road of NLEX and G. Molina Street, the road marks the border between Paso de Blas and Canumay East. Maysan Road terminates at the intersection with ITC Compound Road by Valenzuela's border with North Caloocan, where it continues as General Luis Street to Quirino Highway and Susano Road in Novaliches, Quezon City.

== Intersections ==
The entire route is located in Valenzuela, Metro Manila.

km	mi	Destinations	Notes
		N1 (MacArthur Highway) – Malabon, Malanday, Bulacan	Western terminus. Northbound goes to Bulacan and nearby provinces; southbound goes to Malabon and southern Caloocan.
		Serafia Street (St. Louis Compound 3)	
		ALERT Center Compound Access Road	
		Cecilio J. Santos Street	No entry for trucks. Alternate access to McArthur Highway.
		Isidro Francisco Street	
		M. Antonio Street	
		E. Cabral Street	
		Tongco Street	Switches to a one-way road during weekdays.
		Ilang-Ilang Street	
		Molave Street	
		F. Dela Cruz Street	
		Sampaguita Street	Road name changes to Paso de Blas Road.
		Dr. M. Laurel Street	
		T. Santiago Street	Access to West Canumay and Lingunan.
		Fortune Drive	
		P. Santiago Street	
		L. San Diego Street	
		AH 26 (E1) (North Luzon Expressway) – Balintawak, Tarlac, Baguio	Southbound to Balintawak & Skyway; northbound to Northern & Central Luzon.
		East Service Road	Northbound access to Lawang Bato, Canumay East & Punturin in Valenzuela, Malhacan and Libtong in Meycauayan; southbound access to Mapulang Lupa & Ugong in Valenzuela.
		VGC Access Road	Valenzuela Gateway Complex internal road.
		IRC Compound Road	Road name changes to Bagbaguin Road.
		G. Molina Street	
		A. Mariano Street	Bagbaguin Road and General Luis Street are both in use beyond this point.
		ITC Road	Access to Lawang Bato, Punturin. Road continues eastward as General Luis Street. Access to Novaliches Proper, northern Caloocan & Fairview.
1.000 mi = 1.609 km; 1.000 km = 0.621 mi
