= Tandang Sora Avenue =

Major thoroughfare in Quezon City, Philippines

Coordinates: 14°40′19″N 121°3′1″E

C-5 Tandang Sora Avenue

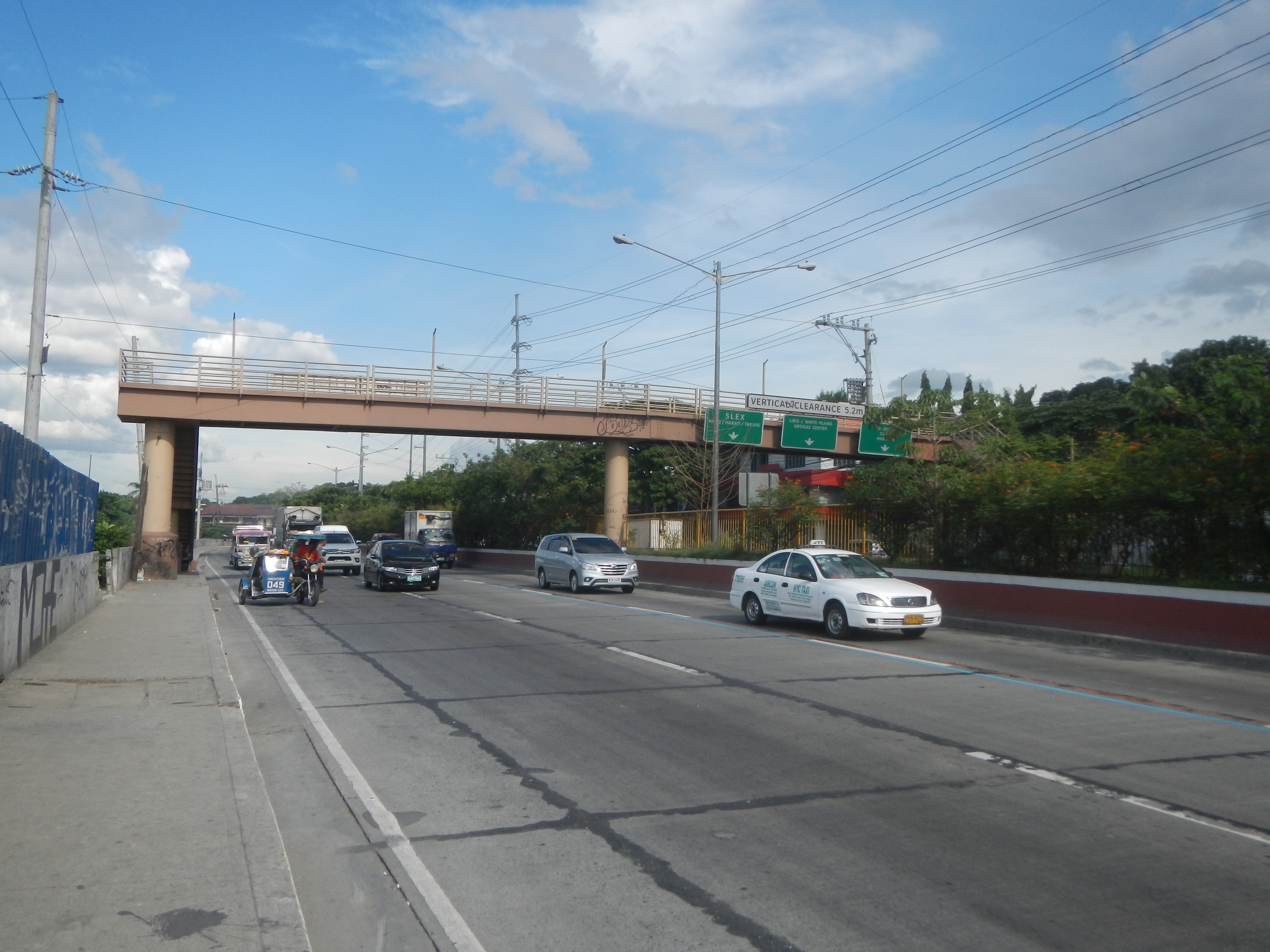
- 2018 photo of Tandang Sora Avenue just east of Commonwealth Avenue in Matandang Balara

Route information
- Maintained by Department of Public Works and Highways - Quezon City 1st District Engineering Office and Metropolitan Manila Development Authority
- Length: 9.6 km (6.0 mi)
- Component highways: From Commonwealth to Magsaysay & Katipunan Avenues: N129; C-5 C-5

Major junctions
- West end: N127 (Quirino Highway) and Tullahan Road in Talipapa and Baesa
- General Avenue; N128 (Mindanao Avenue); Banlat Road; Visayas Avenue; N129 (Congressional Avenue); N170 (Commonwealth Avenue); N129 (Luzon Avenue); Capitol Hills Drive
- East end: N129 (Katipunan Avenue) and Magsaysay Avenue in U.P. Campus and Pansol

Location
- Country: Philippines
- Major cities: Quezon City

Highway system
- Roads in the Philippines; Highways; Expressways; List

Tandang Sora Avenue (formerly known as Banlat Road) is a major east-west thoroughfare bisecting Quezon City in Metro Manila, Philippines. It is a two-to-six-lane highway and municipal road that runs for 9.6 kilometers (6.0 mi) from its eastern terminus at Magsaysay Avenue in Pansol and U.P. Campus in Diliman to its western terminus at Quirino Highway in Baesa and Talipapa in Novaliches, crossing Barangays Culiat, New Era, Pasong Tamo, Tandang Sora, and Sangandaan.

The avenue's segment east of Commonwealth Avenue is a national secondary road with the route designation N129; it also forms part of the Circumferential Road 5 (C-5) network of the Metro Manila arterial road system. Its western segment in Tandang Sora and Culiat, west of Commonwealth Avenue, is a narrow municipal road classified as a national tertiary road.

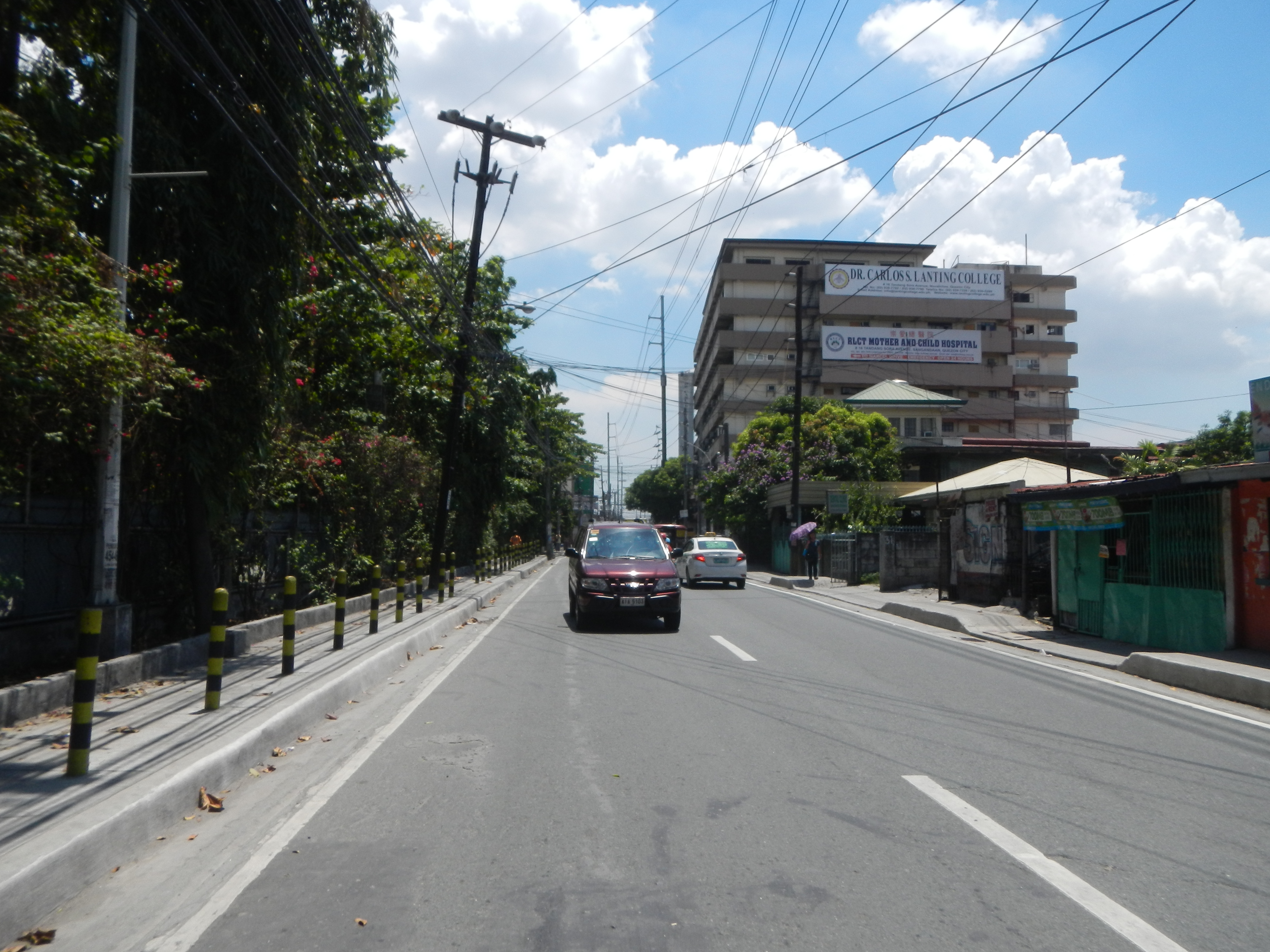
Tandang Sora Avenue looking east near the junction with Quirino Highway in Talipapa

Tandang Sora Avenue was named after its location in the barangay of Tandang Sora. The barrio, in turn, was renamed from Talipapa in 1952 in honor of Filipina patriot Melchora Aquino.

A flyover linking Tandang Sora Avenue with Luzon Avenue over Commonwealth Avenue in Culiat was built in 2009 as part of the C-5 Road network project. In February 2019, the Department of Public Works and Highways announced the demolition of a flyover of Commonwealth Avenue at the Tandang Sora junction in New Era to make way for the construction of the Tandang Sora station of the Manila Metro Rail Transit System Line 7 (MRT-7). A Metro Manila Subway station is also planned at the avenue's junction with Mindanao Avenue in Tandang Sora.

== Intersections ==
The entire route is located in Quezon City.

km	mi	Destinations	Notes
		N127 (Quirino Highway) / Tullahan Road	Western terminus, traffic light intersection. Continues northwestward to Caloocan as Tullahan Road.
		Marcel Drive	
		Creekside Drive	Gated road
		General Avenue	Alternate access to Mindanao and Congressional Avenue via Road 20.
		Narra Street	
		N128 (Mindanao Avenue)	Former traffic light intersection. Opposite segments accessible via U-turn slots.
		J. Geronimo Drive	
		D. Geronimo Street	
		Venus Street	
		Banlat Road	
		Doña Sotera Street	
		Don Felipe Street	
		Visayas Avenue	Unsignaled intersection
		San Miguel Road	
		Himlayan Road / S. Macaya Street	
		Philand Drive	
		N129 (Congressional Avenue Extension)	Opposite segments accessible via U-turn slots
		Cenacle Drive	Alternate access to Visayas Avenue
		Glenn Street	
		Allan Bean Street	
		Cassanova Drive	
		Union Avenue	
		Armstrong Street	
		San Ponciano Street	
		D. Reynaldo Street	
		N170 (Commonwealth Avenue)	Former traffic light intersection; closed to give way to the construction of MRT-7 Tandang Sora station. Access to opposite segments via U-turn slots or nearby roads.
		Road 1	
		Road 2	
		Road 3	
		Peace Valley Street	
		N129 (Luzon Overpass)	West end of C-5 concurrency. Access to N170 (Commonwealth Avenue) and N129 (Luzon Avenue).
		Vic Valley Street	
		University Valley Street	
		Capitol Hills Drive	
		N129 (Katipunan Avenue) / Magsaysay Street	Unsignaled intersection. Continues south as Katipunan Avenue.
1.000 mi = 1.609 km; 1.000 km = 0.621 mi: Concurrency terminus; Incomplete access

== Landmarks ==
This is from west to east:

- Crossroads Park Mall
- Dr. Carlos S. Lanting College
- Banlat Bridge
- St. Mark Integrated School
- Pasong Tamo Bridge (San Juan River)
- Philippine Public Safety College
- Balara Filters Park
