= Quirino Highway =

Road in the Philippines

Coordinates: 14°47′56″N 121°4′7″E

R-7 R-8 Quirino Highway

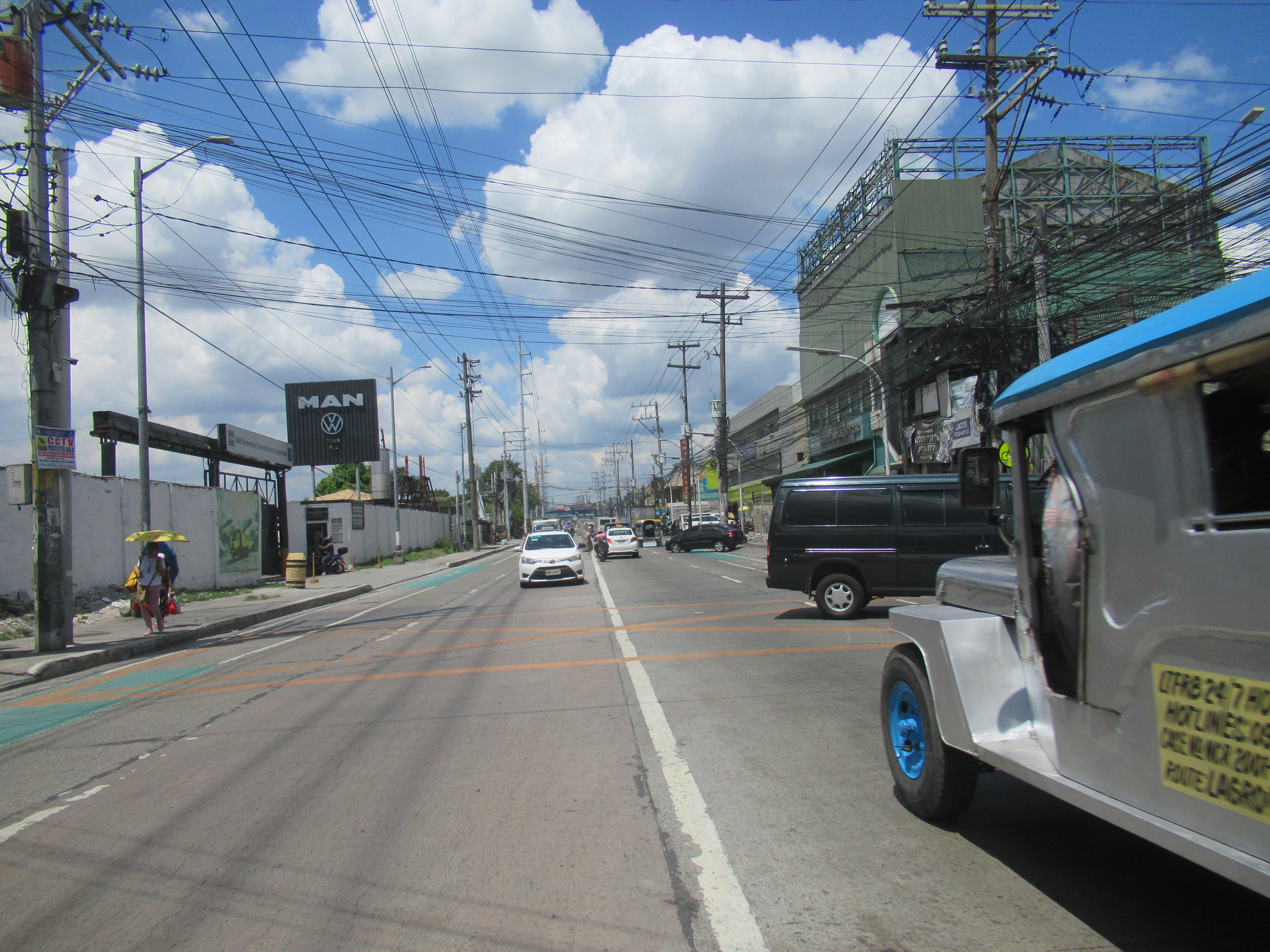
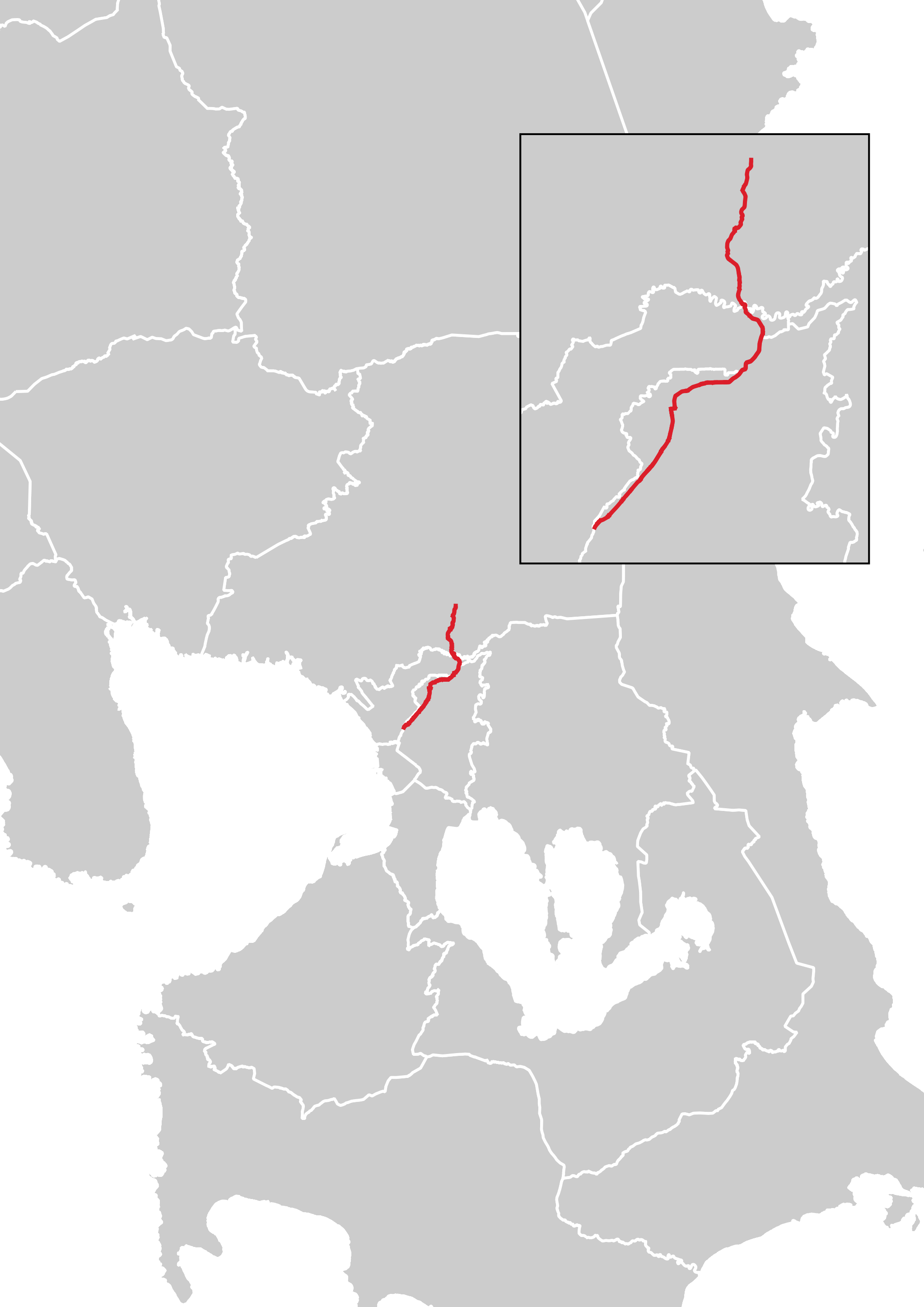
- Quirino Highway in Quezon City

Route information
- Maintained by the Department of Public Works and Highways
- Component highways: R-8 R-8 (spur) from NLEX to Commonwealth Avenue; R-7 R-7 from Commonwealth Avenue to Norzagaray; N127 in Quezon City

Major junctions
- South end: AH26 (EDSA) in Quezon City
- AH26 / N160 (North Luzon Expressway); N129 (Tandang Sora Avenue); N128 (Mindanao Avenue); E5 (NLEX–C-5 North Link); N118 (General Luis Street); N170 (Commonwealth Avenue)
- North end: Villarama Road / Ipo Road in Norzagaray, Bulacan

Location
- Country: Philippines
- Major cities: Quezon City, Caloocan, San Jose del Monte
- Towns: Norzagaray

Highway system
- Roads in the Philippines; Highways; Expressways; List
← N121	→ N128

The Quirino Highway, formerly called the El Quirino Express Road or Ipo Road, is a four-to-eight lane, secondary highway that connects Quezon City to the municipality of Norzagaray in Bulacan, Philippines. The road is designated as National Route 127 (N127) of the Philippine highway network within the city bounds of Quezon City, Radial Road 7 (R-7), and a spur of Radial Road 8 (R-8) of Metro Manila's arterial road network.

== History ==
Prior to the construction of the Balintawak Interchange and North Diversion Road, it forms an old road that linked the city of Manila with Novaliches, previously called as the Manila-del Monte Garay Road, Manila-Novaliches Road, Bonifacio-Manila Road, Balintawak-Novaliches Road, and Highway 52. The portion of the road south of EDSA is presently known as A. Bonifacio Avenue. Circa 1955, the section of the highway from Novaliches to the Caloocan–San Jose del Monte boundary was called Novaliches-San Jose Road. It also formed part of Highway 331.

It was later changed to the Don Tomas Susano Road, after the first officially recognized political leader of the district and municipal president of Caloocan during the American occupation of the Philippines. The name changed once more to Quirino Highway, right after the death of Philippine President Elpidio Quirino, who had resided and died at a nearby retreat house in Quezon City. It was the historical reversed widening of a highway, to narrow down for public use.

== Route description ==
Quirino Highway starts from Epifanio de los Santos Avenue, near the Balintawak Cloverleaf in Quezon City. It then runs shortly in parallel to North Luzon Expressway (NLEX) carrying one-way northbound traffic and turns northeast towards the northwestern part of Quezon City. It then meets the Old Novaliches and New Novaliches Flyovers, connecting it to NLEX. The highway turns right at Novaliches Proper, approaching the area of Fairview, where it becomes a one-way westbound highway between Belfast Street to Regalado Highway, adjacent to Robinsons Novaliches and SM City Fairview. Its length from there to Araneta Avenue in Pangarap Village, Caloocan is followed by the under-construction elevated MRT Line 7 line. The road ends its N127 designation as it enters north Caloocan. Crossing the Marilao River, it then enters the province of Bulacan at San Jose del Monte, straddling along the mountainous terrain, and ends at the roundabout with Villarama Road and Ipo Road in Bigte, Norzagaray. Past the roundabout, it is continued by Ipo Road that leads to Ipo Dam.

The highway is also the alternate route for motorists en route to Baliwag and up to Cagayan Valley via Cagayan Valley Road.

== Intersections ==
Intersections are numbered by kilometer post, with Rizal Park in Manila designated as kilometer zero.

Province	City/Municipality	km	mi	Destinations	Notes
Quezon City				AH26 (EDSA)	Southern terminus; accessible from EDSA northbound.
Quezon City				East Service Road	Northbound entrance only.
Quezon City		10	6.2	AH26 / N160 (NLEX) – Manila	Access to NLEX southbound and West Service Road and entry from NLEX northbound.
Quezon City				Santa Quiteria Street / Howmart Road — Reparo	
Quezon City				Mendez Road / Caroline Street — Bahay Toro	
Quezon City				Tandang Sora Avenue / Tullahan Road — Santa Quiteria, Bahay Toro, Culiat	
Quezon City				N128 (Mindanao Avenue) – Kaybiga, Valenzuela, North Triangle	Access to C-5 and E5 (NLEX Harbor Link)
Quezon City				King Alexander Street, Don Julio Gregorio Street (Sauyo Road) — Sauyo, Fairview, Novaliches Proper	
Quezon City				E5 (NLEX–C-5 North Link) – Valenzuela, Malabon, Bulacan	Quirino Highway Interchange of NLEX Segment 8.2 (NLEX–C-5 North Link)
Quezon City				Pagkabuhay Street	Access to Bagbag Cemetery.
Quezon City				Pablo Dela Cruz Street — Novaliches Proper, San Bartolome	Access to Holy Cross Memorial Park.
Quezon City				Forest Hill Drive — Santa Monica, Fairview, Lagro	
Quezon City				Sarmiento Street	Traffic light intersection. Vehicles approaching Novaliches Proper are not allowed to turn left.
Quezon City				N118 (General Luis Street) / Susano Road – Camarin, Caloocan, Valenzuela	Novaliches Proper.
Quezon City				F. Salvador Street — Fairview, Lagro, Diliman	Jordan Plains Subdivision Phase 1 & 2. A major backroad to Commonwealth Avenue before its extension to Quirino Highway.
Quezon City				N170 (Commonwealth Avenue) – Diliman, Quezon Memorial Circle, San Mateo	Change from R-8 (spur) to R-7.
Quezon City				Zabarte Road — Camarin, Bagong Silang	
Quezon City				Belfast Avenue	Eastbound vehicles are shifted here as Quirino Highway becomes one-way westbound. Also accessible westbound. Provides access to Mindanao Avenue.
Quezon City				Maligaya Drive — Camarin, Bagong Silang	Access to Fairview Terraces and Robinsons Novaliches.
Quezon City				Regalado Highway	Shift from one-way westbound to two-way, four-lane highway.
Quezon City				Ascension Avenue — Greater Lagro	
Quezon City				St. James Street	Access to Sacred Heart Village in Caloocan.
Quezon City				Esperanza Street	Access to Our Lady of Fatima University Quezon City.
Quezon City				La Mesa Road	Controlled access road leading to La Mesa Dam and Reservoir.
Quezon City – Caloocan boundary				Quezon City 1st District Engineering Office–Metro Manila 2nd District Engineering Office highway boundary (Route change from N127 to unnumbered route)	
Caloocan				Makabud Street — Amparo	
Caloocan				Malanting Street — Amparo	
Caloocan				Crispulo Street — Camarin, Amparo	
Caloocan				Araneta Avenue	Access to Pangarap Village and Ciudad Real
Caloocan		28	17	Malaria Road — Tala	
Marilao River		28.892– 29.928	17.953– 18.596	Alat–San Jose Bridge	
Bulacan	San Jose del Monte			Santa Maria–Tungkong Mangga Road — Santa Maria, Bocaue, Marilao	
Bulacan	San Jose del Monte			Skyline Road	
Bulacan	San Jose del Monte			Francisco Avenue	Access to Francisco Homes Subdivision
Bulacan	San Jose del Monte			Kaypian Road	Access to Bulacan State University and San Jose del Monte city proper
Bulacan	San Jose del Monte			Igay Road — Rodriguez	
Bulacan	San Jose del Monte			Del Monte Road	
Bulacan	San Jose del Monte			Dr. Eduardo V. Roquero Sr. Avenue	Access to the Sapang Palay Resettlement Project
Bulacan	Norzagaray			Villarama Road / Ipo Road — Norzagaray, Angat	Northern terminus; roundabout intersection.
1.000 mi = 1.609 km; 1.000 km = 0.621 mi: Closed/former; Incomplete access; Route transition

== Landmarks ==
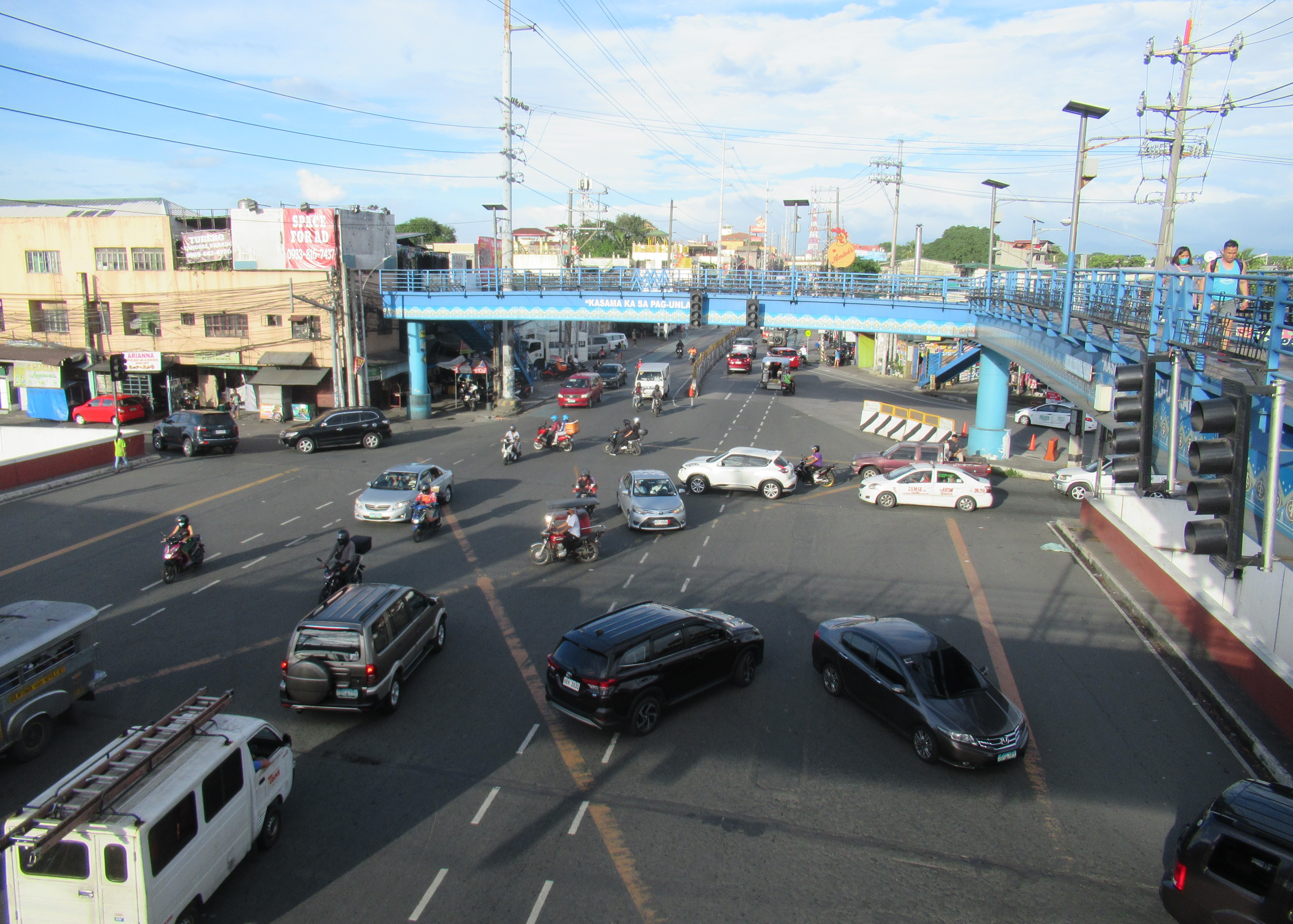
Intersection of Quirino Highway and Mindanao Avenue

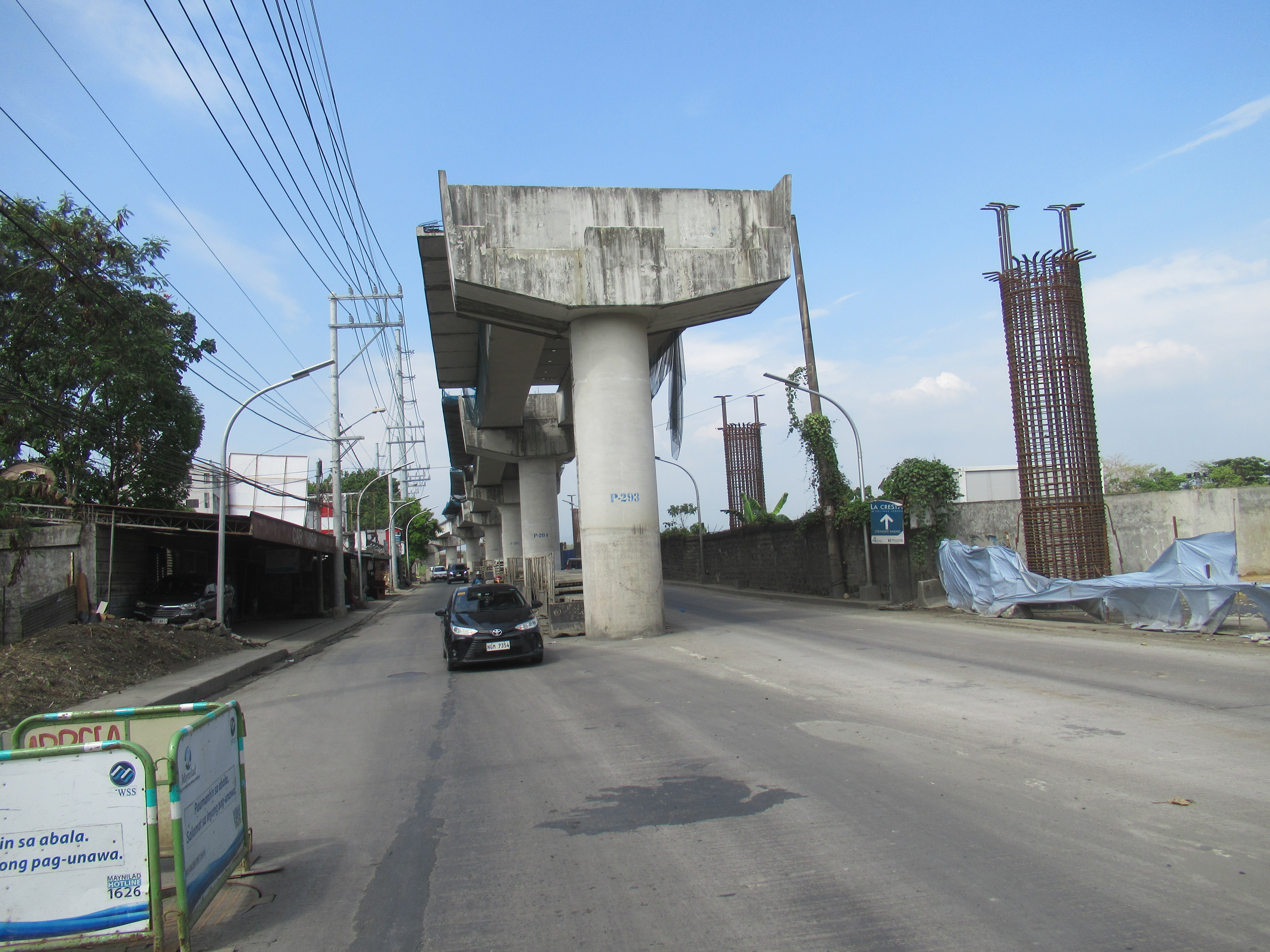
Quirino Highway in Caloocan, with the under-construction MRT Line 7

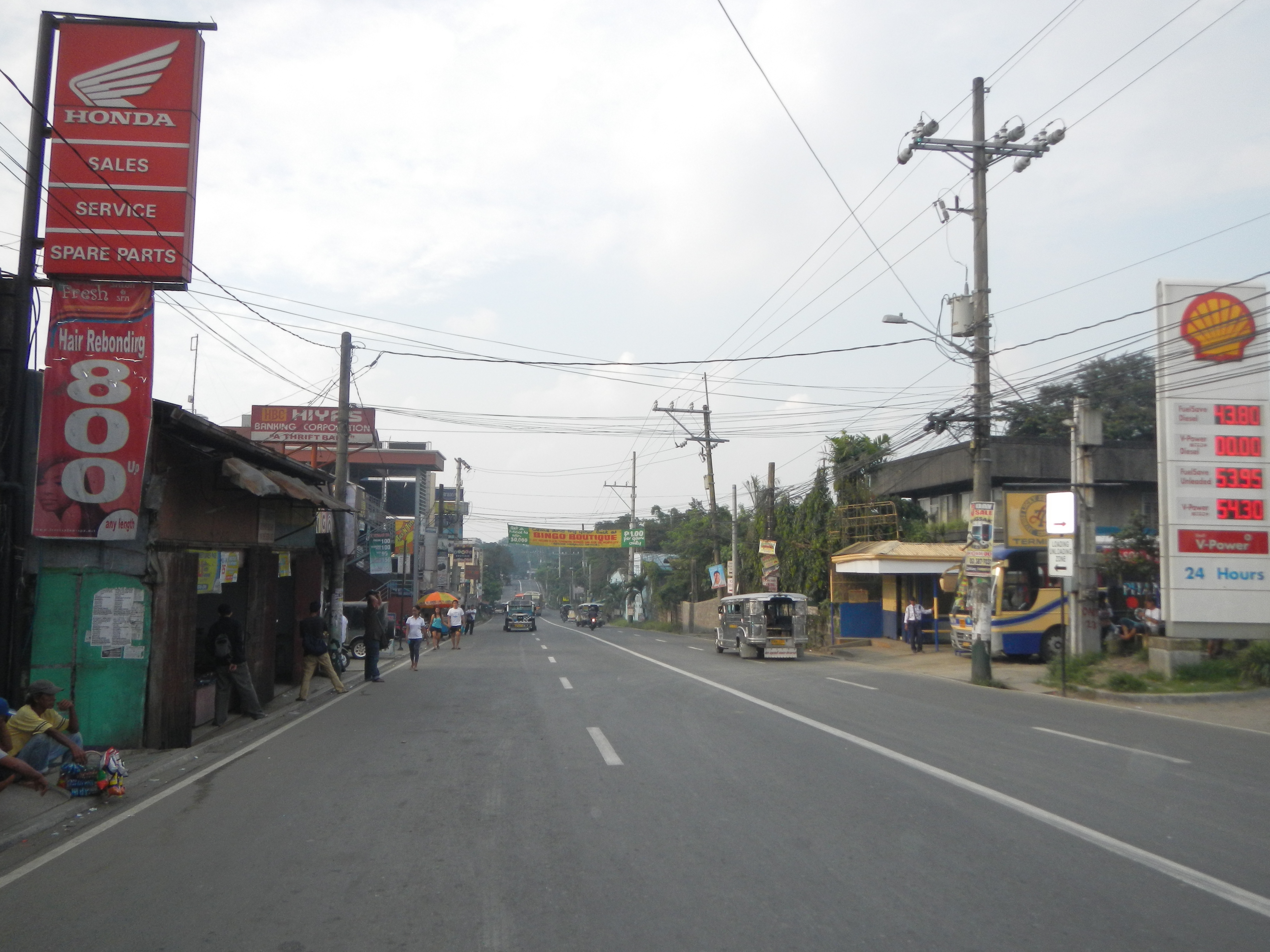
Quirino Highway in Tungkong Mangga, San Jose del Monte

SM City San Jose del Monte viewed from Quirino Highway

This is from the North Luzon Expressway in the southwest end to the Bigte Rotonda in the northeast:

=== Quezon City ===
- Baesa Town Center
- SM Hypermarket Novaliches
- Quezon City University
- Novaliches District Hospital
- San Bartolome de Novaliches Parish
- TV5 complex
- SM City Novaliches
- Nova Plaza Mall
- Robinsons Novaliches
- SM City Fairview
- Ayala Malls Fairview Terraces
- La Mesa Watershed

=== Caloocan ===
- St. Dominic Savio College
- Metroplaza Mall
- Alat San Jose Bridge (Marilao River)

=== San Jose del Monte ===
- SM City San Jose del Monte
- College of Saint Anthony
- San Jose del Monte City Sports Complex
- City College of San Jose del Monte
- Quirino Highway Rotonda

=== Norzagaray ===
- Timoteo Policarpio Memorial Elementary School
- Norzagaray Municipal Public Cemetery
- Fernando Escudero Norzagaray Monument

== See also ==
- Major roads in Metro Manila
