= Congressional Avenue =

Highway in Quezon City, Philippines

Coordinates: 14°39′22″N 121°3′22″E

C-5 Congressional Avenue

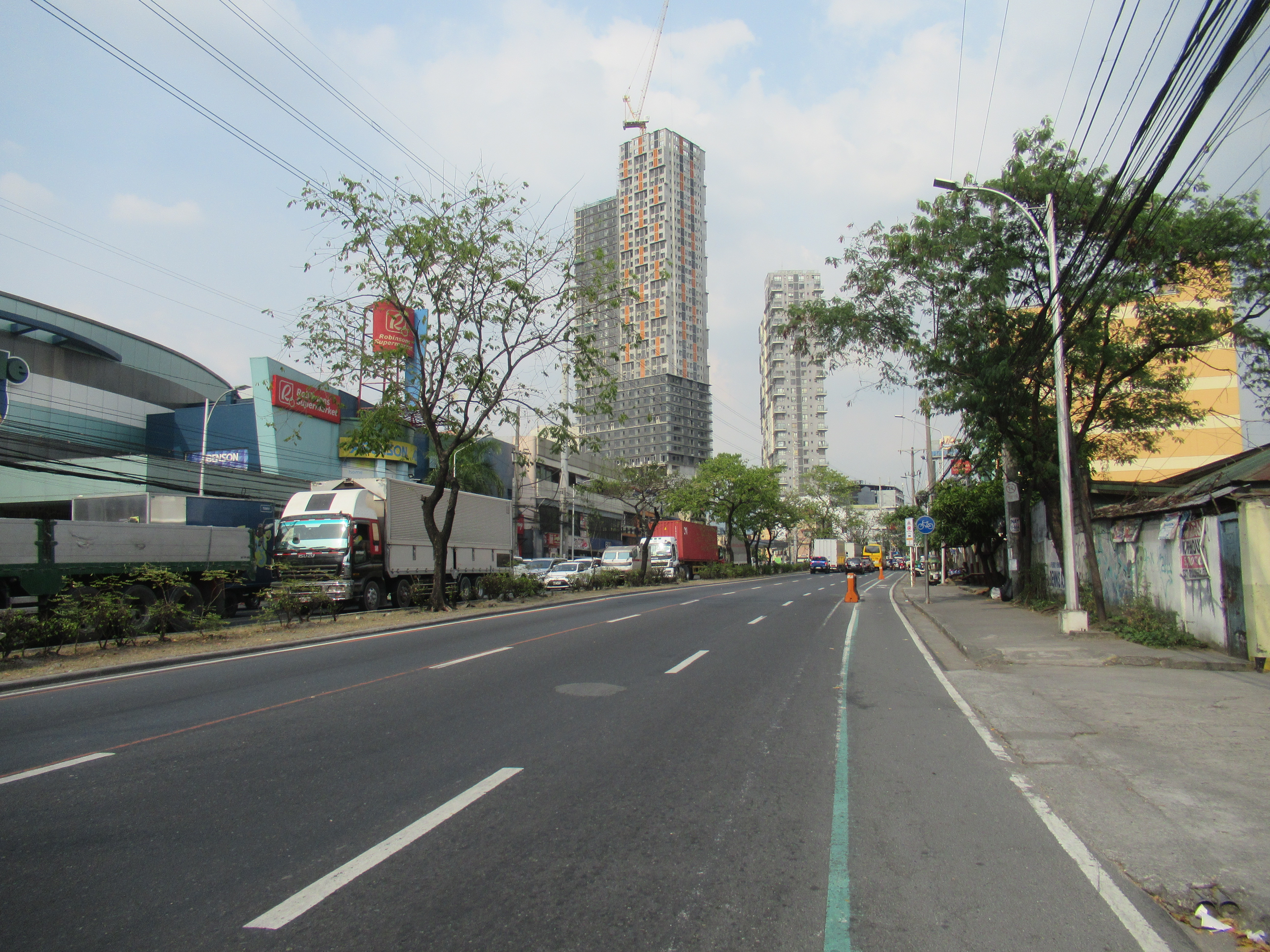
- The avenue in Bahay Toro, 2023

Route information
- Maintained by the Department of Public Works and Highways – Quezon City 1st District Engineering Office
- Length: 6 km (3.7 mi) Approximate length, including extension
- Component highways: C-5 C-5 from Mindanao Avenue to Luzon Avenue; N129

Major junctions
- West end: AH 26 (N1) (Epifanio Delos Santos Avenue)
- N128 (Mindanao Avenue)
- East end: N129 (Luzon Avenue)

Location
- Country: Philippines
- Major cities: Quezon City

Highway system
- Roads in the Philippines; Highways; Expressways; List

Congressional Avenue (Filipino: Abenida Kongresyonal) is a 6-kilometer (3.7 mi) six-lane highway in Quezon City, Philippines. It is one of the secondary roads in Metro Manila. Part of it is designated as part of Circumferential Road 5 (C-5) of the Manila arterial road system and National Route 129 (N129) of the Philippine highway system.

Congressional Avenue starts from the intersection between EDSA and Fernando Poe Jr. Avenue (formerly Roosevelt), passes through some of the Project areas, Tandang Sora, Culiat, and Pasong Tamo, and ends at Luzon Avenue at the boundary of Matandang Balara.

The avenue is one of the rising food destinations in Quezon City because many food establishments, such as food parks, have set up shop along Congressional Avenue Extension.

== Route description ==
Congressional Avenue follows an L route from EDSA to Luzon Avenue. The main segment, west of the intersection with Visayas Avenue, is characterized by numerous intersections. Major intersections are enforced with signal lights, while minor intersections are either unsignaled or use improvised U-turn slots. The extension segment, east of the intersection with Visayas Avenue, is characterized by partial access control, where at-grade intersections are replaced by U-turn slots. The outermost lanes along the entire stretch of the avenue are designated as bicycle lanes.

== History ==
According to the 1949 Plan of Quezon City, Congressional Avenue was supposed to connect to the National Government Center at Constitution Hills (present-day Batasan Hills), which would house government offices, including the Congress, from which its name is apparently derived. However, this plan was partially materialized as the road did not reach that area.

In the early 2010s, the avenue was envisioned to be extended into Luzon Avenue to complement the completion of the Circumferential Road 5, which includes the widening of the C.P. Garcia (through U.P. Campus) and Luzon Avenues, the Extension of Congressional Avenue, and the construction of the Luzon Avenue Flyover, which aims to divert C-5 and traffic from the narrow Tandang Sora Avenue in going to the Project areas and Mindanao Avenue towards the C-5 segment of North Luzon Expressway.

== Intersections ==
The entire route is located in Quezon City. This list includes the section of the avenue named Congressional Avenue Extension. Kilometers are measured from Rizal Park, the Kilometer Zero.

km	mi	Destinations	Notes
		AH 26 (N1) (EDSA)	Western Terminus. Continues south as Fernando Poe Jr. Avenue which can be accessed by using u-turn slots.
		Cagayan Street / S&R Service Road	Traffic light intersection
		Shorthorn Street	Accessible from westbound lanes via U-turn slot at Hereford Street Intersection. Access to Project 8.
		Spring Drive / Sta. Gertrudes Street	Traffic light intersection
		N128 (Mindanao Avenue)	Traffic light intersection. West end of C-5 concurrency
		Jupiter Street	Traffic light intersection
		Visayas Avenue	Traffic light intersection
		Tandang Sora Avenue	Intersection closed; Access from opposite directions via U-turn slot.
		N129 (Luzon Avenue)	Eastern terminus. No left turn allowed from eastbound.
1.000 mi = 1.609 km; 1.000 km = 0.621 mi: Concurrency terminus; Incomplete access

== Landmarks ==
This is from west to east:

- Congressional Avenue Bridge (San Juan River)
- Jose Abad Santos Memorial School
- Circle C
- SM Hypermarket
- Congressional Avenue Extension Bridge (San Juan River)
