= N129 highway =

Road in the Philippines

Route 129

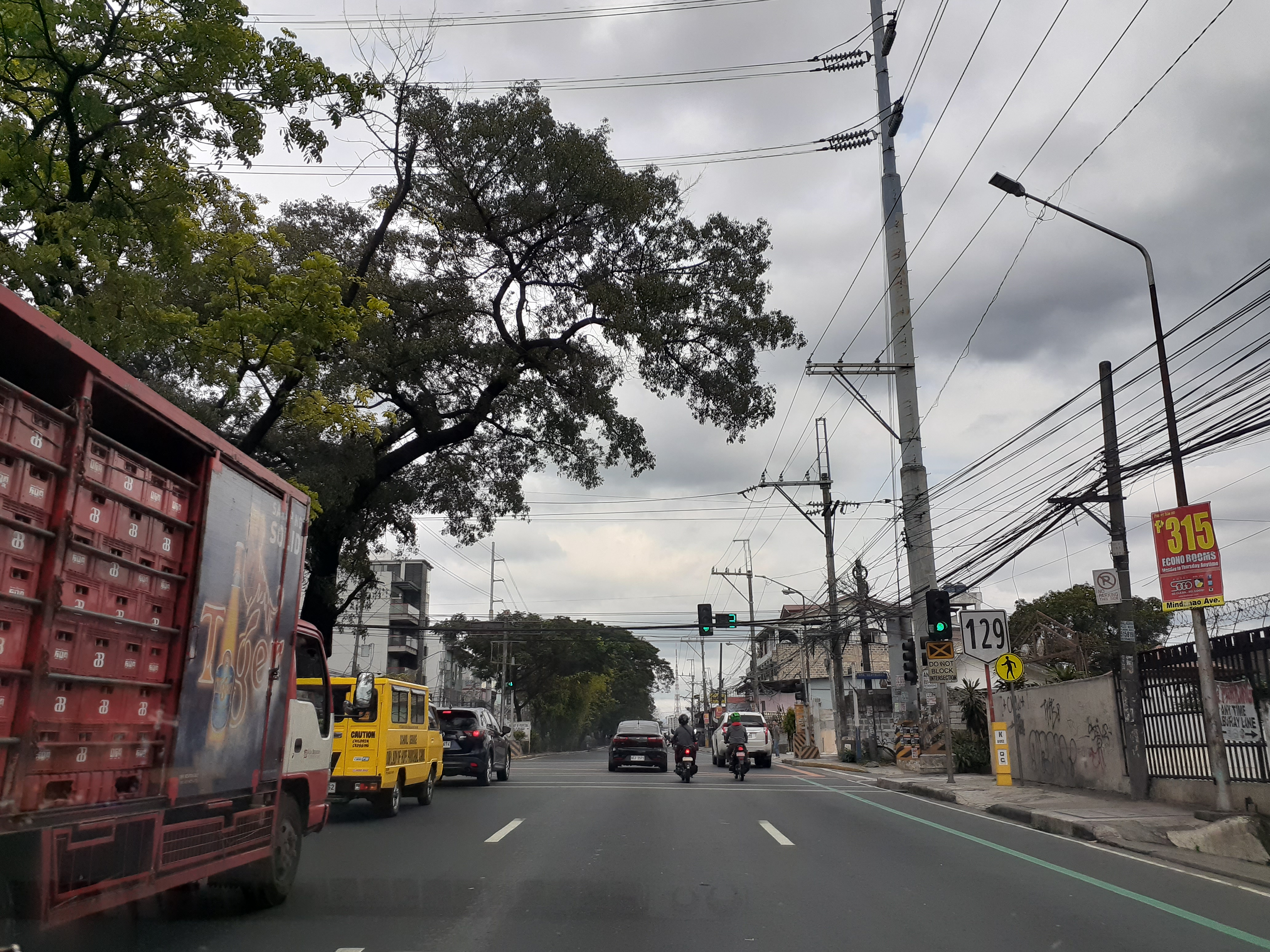
- Congressional Avenue with the route reassurance sign

Route information
- Maintained by Department of Public Works and Highways and Metropolitan Manila Development Authority

Major junctions
- West end: AH 26 (N1) (EDSA) in Ramon Magsaysay, Quezon City
- N128 (Mindanao Avenue); N170 (Commonwealth Avenue)
- East end: N11 (Katipunan Avenue) / C.P. Garcia Avenue in U.P. Campus, Quezon City

Location
- Country: Philippines
- Major cities: Quezon City

Highway system
- Roads in the Philippines; Highways; Expressways; List

National Route 129 (N129), or Route 129, is a secondary national route in Metro Manila that forms part of the Philippine highway network. Entirely located within Quezon City, it comprises Congressional Avenue, Congressional Avenue Extension, a portion of Luzon Avenue, a portion of Tandang Sora Avenue, and a portion of Katipunan Avenue; most of them are part of C-5 except the EDSA–Mindanao Avenue segment.

== Route Description ==
=== Congressional Avenue ===
Route 129 starts at the junction between Fernando Poe Jr. Avenue (formerly Roosevelt Avenue) and Epifanio de los Santos Avenue in Barangay Ramon Magsaysay. It crosses Culiat Creek into Barangay Bahay Toro and heads towards the junction with Mindanao Avenue, where it becomes part of the Circumferential Road 5 system. It then briefly passes Visayas Avenue, towards Tandang Sora Avenue, into Barangay Culiat and Pasong Tamo, serving as its boundaries, and ends at the junction with Luzon Avenue.

=== Luzon Avenue ===
Route 129 turns southbound sharply at Luzon Avenue and towards the Luzon Flyover, crossing Commonwealth Avenue. The roads beside the bridge that provides access to Commonwealth Avenue also form part of Route 129. At the other end of the bridge, it then curves gently and meets with the southern segment of Tandang Sora Avenue.

=== Tandang Sora Avenue ===
Route 129 continues with the southern segment of Tandang Sora Avenue in Matandang Balara, which was de-linked with its northern segment upon the construction of MRT Line 7 and the demolition of the Tandang Sora Flyover near Commonwealth Avenue. It crosses the entrance to Capitol Hills and the former Broadcast City area, curving at the Balara Filters Park. The road terminates at the junction with Katipunan and Magsaysay Avenues, beside the MWSS-LWUA Compound and the University of the Philippines Diliman campus.

=== Katipunan Avenue ===
The road continues as Katipunan Avenue, skirting the edge of the University of the Philippines Diliman campus area and heads southward towards U.P. Town Center. The route terminates beside the National Science Complex at the junction between Katipunan and Carlos P. Garcia Avenues.

== Intersections ==
The entire route is located in Quezon City. Kilometers are measured from Rizal Park, the Kilometer Zero.

km	mi	Destinations	Notes
		AH 26 (N1) (EDSA) / Fernando Poe Jr. Avenue – Balintawak, Monumento, Frisco	Western Terminus.
		Cagayan Street / S&R Service Road	Traffic light intersection
		Shorthorn Street — Baesa, Sangandaan	Accessible from westbound lanes via U-turn slot at Hereford Street Intersection. Access to Project 8.
		Spring Drive / Sta. Gertrudes Street	Traffic light intersection
		N128 (Mindanao Avenue) – Novaliches, Baesa, North Triangle	Traffic light intersection. C-5 segment of Congressional Avenue starts here.
		Jupiter Street	Traffic light intersection
		Visayas Avenue — Quezon Memorial Circle	Traffic light intersection
		Tandang Sora Avenue — Culiat, Talipapa, Santa Quiteria	Intersection closed; Access from opposite directions via U-turn slot.
		N129 (Luzon Avenue) – Fairview, Holy Spirit, Sauyo	End of Congressional Avenue segment. Route continues southward. Northbound goes to Fairview, Sauyo, and Holy Spirit areas.
		N129 (Luzon Flyover Service Road) – Quezon Memorial Circle	Provides access to and from N170 (Commonwealth Avenue).
		N129 (Tandang Sora Avenue)	Southern segment of Tandang Sora Avenue. N129 excludes the segment heading towards Commonwealth Avenue.
		Vic Valley Street	
		University Valley Street	
		Capitol Hills Drive	
		N129 (Katipunan Avenue) / Magsaysay Street	End of Tandang Sora Avenue segment. Access to the University of the Philippines Diliman Campus.
		Shuster Street	Southbound only. Gated access to University of the Philippines.
		H. Ventura Street — Marikina, Pansol	Northbound only. Access to Marikina via Tumana Bridge and future access to Batasan–San Mateo Road via Katipunan Avenue Extension.
		Montalban Street	Northbound only. Accessible to pedicabs and pedestrians only.
		Quirino Street	Southbound only. Gated access to University of the Philippines.
13.944– 15.1060	8.664– 9.3864	Carlos P. Garcia Avenue — Krus na Ligas, Marikina, Cubao	Traffic light intersection. Route terminus. Route designation of Katipunan Road going southward changes from N129 to N11.
1.000 mi = 1.609 km; 1.000 km = 0.621 mi: Concurrency terminus; Incomplete access
