= Frost Plan =

City plan of Quezon City, Philippines

Frost Plan (also known as the Frost-Arellano Plan) was the popular name for the Plan of Quezon City, co-authored by Juan M. Arellano and Harry Frost, together with Alpheus Williams and Louis Croft. The plan was approved in 1941, two years after the creation of Quezon City. The Plan was revised in 1949.

== Background ==
On October 12, 1939, Commonwealth Act. No. 502 was enacted, which created Quezon City. The following barrios or sitios: Balingasa, Balintawak, Galas, Kaingin, Kangkong, La Loma, Malamig, Masambong, Matalahib, San Isidro, San Jose, Santol, and Tatalon from Caloocan; Cubao, the western half of Diliman, Kamuning, New Manila, Roxas, and San Francisco del Monte from San Juan; Balara, Barangka, the eastern half of Diliman, Jesus de la Peña and Krus na Ligas from Marikina; Libis, Santolan and Ugong Norte from Pasig, Greenhills and the nearby areas surrounding Wack Wack Golf and Country Club from Mandaluyong, and some barrios from Montalban and San Mateo were to be given to the new capital city. Instead of opposing them, the seven towns willingly gave land to Quezon City in the belief that it would benefit the country's new capital.

On July 14, 1948, Republic Act No. 333 was enacted which established the Capital City Planning Commission, headed by Architect Juan M. Arellano, to craft the master plan for the proposed capital city.

== Aspects of the plan ==
=== National Government Center ===
Batasang Pambansa Complex was built on what was known as Constitution Hill

In the 1941 plan, the National Government Center was supposed to be located around the Quezon Memorial Circle. The Capitol Building housing the legislature was supposed to be built in the middle of the Circle, with the Executive Mansion or the Presidential Palace to its left (now the present site of the Veterans Memorial Medical Center) and the Supreme Court to its right (now the present site of East Avenue Medical Center). The site of Constitution Hill was originally reserved for the Philippine Military Academy.

The centerpiece of the 1949 Plan is the Constitution Hill, in which is now known as Batasan Hills. It would have contained the Executive, Legislative, and Judicial Branches of the Philippine Government.

== See also ==
- Burnham Plan of Manila
