= Metropolitan Manila Transit Corporation =

Former bus company in the Philippines

Metro Manila Transit Corporation
- Parent: Metro Manila Council (1975–1979); Ministry of Transportation and Communications (1979–1995)
- Founded: 1974; 52 years ago (as the Manila Transit Corporation)
- Commenced operation: 1975; 51 years ago
- Ceased operation: 1995; 31 years ago
- Defunct: 1997; 29 years ago
- Headquarters: North Avenue corner Mindanao Avenue, Diliman, Quezon City
- Service area: Metro Manila
- Service type: Bus service, bus leasing
- Operator: Government of the Philippines

The Metropolitan Manila Transit Corporation (MMTC) was a government-owned and controlled corporation that operated as a transport company in Metro Manila, Philippines.

At its peak, MMTC operated several bus routes across Metro Manila. It was best known for its "Love Bus" service and double-decker bus routes.

== History ==
After World War II, the pre-war tranvía streetcar system in Manila was left destroyed, leaving a gap in the city's public transport infrastructure that was subsequently filled by buses and jeepneys. Loose regulations, however, resulted in a fragmented public transportation system in Manila and its suburbs dominated by independent transport operators who competed against each another, resulting in inadequate services.

=== 1970s to 1980s ===
During the martial law period under Ferdinand Marcos, efforts were made to address the problem, as Marcos issued Presidential Decree No. 492 on June 27, 1974, which established a government-owned and controlled corporation called the Manila Transit Corporation (MTC). The MTC would serve the role of integrating all public transportation operations in the region under a single corporate entity, thereby streamlining services and eliminating the issues caused by the proliferation of independent transport operators. It was created with a capital stock of ₱10 million (equivalent to ₱282,419,326 in 2021) divided into 3 million shares. Of these shares, one million shares may be sold to individuals or entities operating public transport vehicles in Metro Manila.

On May 12, 1975, MMTC commenced its initial bus operations, introducing an ordinary bus service with a fleet of 30 units on the Monumento–Pasay Rotunda route.

On November 7, 1975, Marcos issued Presidential Decree No. 824, establishing Metro Manila and the Metropolitan Manila Commission. Following this, on December 25, 1975, the MTC was renamed as the Metropolitan Manila Transit Corporation (MMTC) and its focus was expanded to cover the newly created metropolitan area through the issuance of Presidential Decree No. 860. The decree also exempted the MMTC from regulation under the Public Service Act.

On January 26, 1976, the Love Bus was launched by the MMTC. Introduced as part of the government's Energy Conservation Program in response to the 1973 oil crisis, it was popularized as the first air-conditioned bus service in the country, as well as its strict observance of timetables. The name was said to have been inspired by The Love Bug, the first film in the Herbie franchise.

By May 1977, the Love Bus had carried over 5.34 million passengers, with a study in February 1976 reporting that 38 percent of passengers used to travel by private car or taxi, with many drawn to the service due to its clean, uncrowded, and air-conditioned buses.

On June 27, 1977, Marcos issued Presidential Decree No. 1168, increasing MMTC's corporate stock to ₱25 million (equivalent to ₱706,048,315 in 2021) divided into 6 million shares. The number of shares was then increased to 26 million shares through the issuance of Presidential Decree No. 1465 on June 11, 1978.

In 1978, MMTC introduced an express bus service known as the Singkwenta - Singkwenta Walang Tindigan (lit. 'Fifty - Fifty No Standing') service. It adopted a zonal faring system and primarily served students and professionals. Around this time, the MMTC reportedly had over 2,500 bus drivers and conductresses and 491 employees in its administration and maintenance departments.

On July 23, 1979, Marcos issued Executive Order No. 546, creating the Ministry of Transportation and Communications (MOTC) and designating the MMTC as an attached agency of the MOTC.

By 1980, the MMTC shifted from its original role in monopolizing all public transport operations in Metro Manila to supporting private operators through integrating fewer but larger bus consortiums, acting as a government tool for achieving broader social and developmental goals, such as pioneering new services and routes.

In 1982, the MMTC reported its first profitable year. This would be the only year it generated a profit during its first ten years of operation.

In 1983, the MMTC introduced double-decker buses on the UP-Ayala and Monumento-Ayala routes. Thes double-decker buses charged regular fares but adhered to a designated bus stop system.

On March 20, 1985, Marcos issued Executive Order No. 1011, creating the Land Transportation Commission (LTC) as an attached agency of the MOTC. The order removed MMTC's exemption from regulation, placing it under the authority of the LTC.

At some point in the 1990s, the Love Bus was discontinued due to significant losses incurred by MMTC.

=== Privatization and dissolution ===
Following the People Power Revolution in 1986, which led to Marcos' resignation, the subsequent Aquino administration shifted government policy focus towards the deregulation and privatization of state-owned enterprises, including those in the transport sector. During this period, MMTC's net worth declined between 1983 and 1987 and its debt-to-equity ratio increased. In response, the government recommended the privatization of MMTC through the Asset Privatization Trust.

In 1991, a USAID-funded study conducted by PwC affiliate Joaquin Cunanan & Co. assessed MMTC's financial viability. The study advised against the immediate privatization of MMTC due to the company's liabilities and risk of defaulting on its loans. Instead, it recommended liquidating MMTC's operational assets, including its bus fleet, while retaining its bus leasing and financing functions.

During the Ramos administration, Secretary of Transportation and Communications Pete Nicomedes Prado issued DOTC Department Order No. 92-587 in 1992, which introduced a liberalized policy framework for the transport sector. The framework encouraged increased competition, reduced direct government involvement, and aimed to streamline regulatory processes. These reforms effectively ended MMTC's monopoly on Metro Manila's bus routes and contributed to the return of fragmented and competitive bus operations, which the company had originally been created to manage.

In 1994, a study group was formed to develop a plan for MMTC's privatization. After several failed attempts at liquidation, MMTC was sold to its blue-collar employees on April 10, 1995 in a formal ceremony at Malacañang Palace. The company's remaining fleet of 155 buses were then acquired and operated by four cooperatives formed by former employees: the United Workers Transport Corporation, the Drivers, Conductors, Mechanics (DCOMMP) Multi-Purpose Transport Service Cooperative, Filcomtrans, and Fastrans.

Following its privatization, MMTC maintained a skeletal workforce of 12 employees focused on liquidating its assets, auditing the four groups operating its former buses, and collecting outstanding payments from prior obligations. After the company had completely ceased operations in 1997, its remaining assets were sold and auctioned off.

The northern terminal and garage on the corner of North Avenue and Mindanao Avenue in Quezon City was demolished and returned to the National Housing Authority (NHA). The area of that property was then developed in a joint venture between Ayala Land and the NHA into Vertis North, which is part of the Triangle Park (Quezon City) business district. On the other hand, the 3,593-square-meter (0.3593 ha) southern terminal in Taguig was demolished and returned to Food Terminal Inc. (FTI), which leased the lot and much of the area to the Shoppers Paradise FTI Corporation in the 2000s, then sold most of the area to Ayala Land in 2012, developing most of the area into Arca South.

=== Love Bus revivals ===
Since the discontinuation of the Love Bus, many Filipinos have called for the revival of the Love Bus in an effort to address traffic congestion and encourage private car owners to take public transport.

In 2015, the Department of Transportation and Communications introduced the Premium Point-to-Point Bus Service, an express bus network with fixed schedules and limited to no stops in between terminals. The service has been likened to the Love Bus due to its improved service, premium amenities, and emphasis on attracting private car users to use public transport.

In 2023, Ayala Land and the LTFRB launched e-jeepneys on the Makati Loop route between One Ayala and Circuit Makati in a Love Bus-like livery.

In 2025, during his fourth State of the Nation Address, Philippine president Bongbong Marcos announced that the Love Bus will be revived. Marcos stated that the proposed revival will offer free rides and pilot testing is already ongoing in Cebu City and Davao City.

On September 9, 2026, the revived Love Bus was launched with a single line connecting Eastwood City to Robinsons Galleria via two routes. The service utilizes electric buses that stop at designated areas marked by waiting sheds and is available for free. Other lines are being proposed to serve corridors that have limited transportation, avoiding routes served by franchises such as jeepneys.

== Bus consortia in the 1970s ==
During the Marcos administration, the MMTC was one of a few consortia of bus companies based in Metro Manila, while the other consortia consisted of private bus companies. This was a result of Marcos ordering on June 21, 1976 that all bus companies in Metro Manila should be reorganized into four consortia, with MMTC acting as the fifth consortium.

However, due to different management and logistical problems encountered in reorganizing the bus operators, the requirement was relaxed to nine consortia and the MMTC through Letter of Instruction No. 532 signed on April 20, 1977. Each consortium was required to have at least 200 operating units and bear the consortium's marks and colors on its units. Any bus companies not part of a consortium would have their certificate of public convenience revoked. The deadline for merging into consortia was moved several times from June 1977 to December 1979. The guidelines in Letter of Instruction No. 532 were then replaced by a new set of guidelines made in 1980 through discussions between the bus companies and then-Minister of Transportation Jose P. Dans

List of bus consortia in Metro Manila in June 1977
Consortia	Number of companies	Number of authorized units	Number of actual units
North-South Center Line Consortium	16	461	381
M.C. Transit, Inc.	1	258	253
De Dios-Marikina-Yujuico	9	227	244
MD Transit	2	269	219
JD Transit, Inc.	2	277	277
Guadalupe-Makati-Pateros Operator's Consortium	20	320	272
Eastern Carrier Corp.	18	187	142 (Note: Excludes operators that were recently included in the list but without the number of actual units reported.)
Sapang Palay-Novaliches Bus Operator's Consortium	23	188 (Note: Excludes operators that did not indicate the number of authorized units in their information sheet or pre-consortium agreements.)	314
Manila Southeast Transit Consortium	28	239	206
Metro Manila Transit Corporation	1	600	587
Total	120	3,076	2,889

== Fares ==
In 1977, ordinary buses in the Philippines had a fare of ₱0.25 (equivalent to ₱7 in 2021) for the first 5 kilometers and ₱0.05 (equivalent to ₱1 in 2021) per succeeding kilometer. By 1984, both ordinary buses and double-decker buses had a fare of ₱0.80 (equivalent to ₱8 in 2021) for the first 4 kilometers (2.5 mi) and ₱0.21 (equivalent to ₱2 in 2021) for each succeeding kilometer. Limited buses operated on a flat rate system with a fare of ₱0.70 (equivalent to ₱7 in 2021) per zone with a special fare of ₱1.85 (equivalent to ₱18 in 2021) per zone.

The Love Bus also similarly operated on a flat rate system. A year from its launch, the fare was set at ₱1.50 (equivalent to ₱42 in 2021), which increased to ₱2.50 (equivalent to ₱56 in 2021) in 1979. This amount had increased to ₱5.50 (equivalent to ₱52 in 2021) by 1984, ₱8.50 (equivalent to ₱44 in 2021) by 1990, and ₱10.00 (equivalent to ₱33 in 2021) by 1994.

== Routes ==
In 1984, MMTC operated 54 ordinary bus routes, 28 air-conditioned bus (Love Bus) routes, five limited bus routes, and three double-decker bus routes.

List of MMTC limited bus routes in 1984
Route		Terminals			Length	Notes
1	U.P. Campus - Ayala	U.P. Campus; UP Diliman	↔	Makati CBD; Ayala Avenue	18.4 km (11.4 mi)	
2	U.P. Campus - Quiapo	U.P. Campus; UP Diliman	↔	Quiapo; Quezon Boulevard	18.3 km (11.4 mi)	
3	Sangandaan - Ayala	Caloocan; A. Mabini Street	↔	Makati CBD; Ayala Avenue	19.6 km (12.2 mi)	
4	Monumento - Washington via Ayala, Buendia	Caloocan; Monumento	↔	Makati; Washington Street	19.1 km (11.9 mi)	
5	FTI - Monumento	Taguig; Food Terminal Inc.	↔	Caloocan; Monumento	26.2 km (16.3 mi)	

List of MMTC double-decker bus routes in 1984
Route		Terminals			Length	Notes
1	U.P. Campus - Ayala	U.P. Campus; UP Diliman	↔	Makati CBD; Ayala Avenue	19.5 km (12.1 mi)	
2	Monumento - Leveriza	Caloocan; Monumento	↔	Malate; Leveriza Street	21.6 km (13.4 mi)	
3	Monumento - Ayala	Caloocan; Monumento	↔	Makati CBD; Ayala Avenue	20.0 km (12.4 mi)	

=== Love Bus routes ===
In 1984, MMTC operated 28 Love Bus routes, where 27 routes were within Metro Manila limits while one route was between Metro Manila and Rizal. The first Love Bus route was launched between Escolta and the Makati CBD in 1976 and was its most profitable route.

List of Love Bus routes in 1984
Route		Terminals			Length	Notes
1	Cubao - Escolta via EDSA	Araneta Center; Ali Mall	↔	Binondo; Escolta Street	16.5 km (10.3 mi)	
2	U.P. - Ayala via Cubao	U.P. Campus; UP Diliman	↔	Makati CBD; Ayala Avenue	16.6 km (10.3 mi)	
3	U.P. Campus - Ayala via Escolta	U.P. Campus; UP Diliman	↔	Makati CBD; Ayala Avenue	24.6 km (15.3 mi)	
4	Ayala - Ali Mall, Cubao via Quiapo	Makati CBD; Ayala Avenue	↔	Araneta Center; Ali Mall	14.5 km (9.0 mi)	
5	Ayala - Escolta - Philcoa	Makati CBD; Ayala Avenue	↔	Quezon City; Philcoa	10.6 km (6.6 mi)	
6	New MIA - Ayala	Pasay; Manila International Airport	↔	Makati CBD; Ayala Avenue	7.5 km (4.7 mi)	
7	New MIA - Sta. Cruz	Pasay; Manila International Airport	↔	Santa Cruz; Plaza Santa Cruz	12.0 km (7.5 mi)	
8	FTI - Ayala (MCC)	Western Bicutan; Food Terminal Inc.	↔	Makati CBD; Ayala Avenue	13.8 km (8.6 mi)	
9	Ayala - Cubao via EDSA	Makati CBD; Ayala Avenue	↔	Araneta Center; Ali Mall	10.8 km (6.7 mi)	
10	Ayala - Escolta via Mabini	Makati CBD; Ayala Avenue	↔	Binondo; Escolta Street	10.0 km (6.2 mi)	
11	Ayala - Marikina (MMC)	Makati CBD; Ayala Avenue	↔	Marikina; Shoe Avenue	19.1 km (11.9 mi)	
12	Ayala - Sta. Cruz (MMC)	Makati CBD; Ayala Avenue	↔	Santa Cruz; Plaza Santa Cruz	9.9 km (6.2 mi)	
13	Ayala - Quiapo (MCC)	Makati CBD; Ayala Avenue	↔	Quiapo; Quezon Boulevard	9.5 km (5.9 mi)	
14	MIA - Cubao via EDSA	Pasay; Manila International Airport	↔	Araneta Center; Ali Mall	16.4 km (10.2 mi)	
15	PNR Caloocan - Ayala	Caloocan; Caloocan station	↔	Makati CBD; Ayala Avenue	11.1 km (6.9 mi)	
16	U.P. - Quiapo	U.P. Campus; UP Diliman	↔	Quiapo; Quezon Boulevard	24.7 km (15.3 mi)	
17	Antipolo - Ayala via EDSA, Crossing, Rosario	Antipolo; P. Oliveros Street	↔	Makati CBD; Ayala Avenue	23.0 km (14.3 mi)	Operated by EMBC.
18	Ayala - Greenhills	Makati CBD; Ayala Avenue	↔	Greenhills; Greenhills Shopping Center	8.6 km (5.3 mi)	
19	Ayala - Quiapo	Makati CBD; Ayala Avenue	↔	Quiapo; Quezon Boulevard	9.5 km (5.9 mi)	
20	Ayala - MIA	Makati CBD; Ayala Avenue	↔	Pasay; Manila International Airport	8.8 km (5.5 mi)	
21	Ayala - Philtrade	Makati CBD; Ayala Avenue	↔	Pasay; PhilTrade	5.3 km (3.3 mi)	
22	Ayala - Muñoz	Makati CBD; Ayala Avenue	↔	Quezon City; Muñoz Market	15.7 km (9.8 mi)	
23	Ayala - Philcoa	Makati CBD; Ayala Avenue	↔	Quezon City; Philcoa	14.1 km (8.8 mi)	
24	Ayala - U.P. Campus	Makati CBD; Ayala Avenue	↔	U.P. Campus; UP Diliman	16.8 km (10.4 mi)	
25	Ayala - Cubao via Quiapo	Makati CBD; Ayala Avenue	↔	Araneta Center; Ali Mall	23.0 km (14.3 mi)	
26	U.E. Caloocan - Ayala via DBP Buendia Crispa	Caloocan; UE Caloocan	↔	Makati CBD; Ayala Avenue	21.1 km (13.1 mi)	
27	U.E. Caloocan - Ayala	Caloocan; UE Caloocan	↔	Makati CBD; Ayala Avenue	20.9 km (13.0 mi)	
28	Monumento - Buendia via Ayala	Caloocan; Monumento	↔	Pasay; Buendia Avenue	19.9 km (12.4 mi)	

In 1987, the number of Love Bus routes was reduced to 14 routes:

- Cubao - Escolta
- Cubao - Ayala
- Buendia - Ayala
- Buendia - Greenhills
- Greenhills - Crossing
- Crossing - Ayala
- U.P. - Ayala
- U.P. - Guadalupe
- PNR - Ayala via Monumento
- PNR Monumento - Crossing
- Muñoz - Ayala
- Muñoz - Crossing
- PNR - Ortigas
- West EDSA - Ayala

In 1983, the Love Bus routes were complemented by Pag-Ibig routes, which were air-conditioned bus routes operated by other bus companies. At some point, MMTC eventually took over the Pag-Ibig routes due to poor expertise and high operating costs incurred by these companies.

By 1989, MMTC was only operating four Love Bus and Pag-Ibig Bus routes.

List of Love Bus and Pag-Ibig Bus routes in 1989
Route		Terminals			Length	Notes
1	Ali Mall - Ayala - Escolta	Araneta Center; Ali Mall	↔	Binondo; Escolta Street	33 km (21 mi)	Loop route
2	PNR / UE - MIA	Caloocan; Caloocan station	↔	Pasay; Manila International Airport	34 km (21 mi)	
3	Broadway - Ayala - Washington	Broadway Centrum; Broadway Avenue	↔	Makati; Washington Street	27 km (17 mi)	
4	Pansol - Ayala	Pansol, Quezon City; Katipunan Avenue	↔	Makati CBD; Ayala Avenue	19 km (12 mi)	

== Fleet ==
The MMTC operated several types of buses, each with varying specifications. The ordinary and limited buses were 2.5 m (8.2 ft) wide, 3.3 m (11 ft) high, and 11.0 m (36.1 ft) long. The ordinary buses had a seating capacity of 59, while the limited buses had 58 seats. The double-decker buses measured 2.5 m (8.2 ft) in width, 4.7 m (15 ft) in height, and 11.0 m (36.1 ft) in length, and had 100 seats. The Love Bus measured 2.5 m (8.2 ft) wide, 4.7 m (15 ft) high, and 10.0 m (32.8 ft) long, with a seating capacity of 54.

The Love Bus formerly ran on a fleet of air-conditioned buses that had a monocoque body design, which was considered a significant milestone at the time as before 1975, all buses in the Philippines were flatbed trucks mounted with wooden bodies. Its former fleet initially consisted of buses made by industry giants Hino, Mercedes-Benz, and Volvo, then expanded into then-lesser known brands such as Ford, Fiat, and four other companies.

The MMTC was also known for maintaining bus operations even during heavy rains or flood. During the curfew under the martial law period, the MetroCom would also direct the MMTC to deploy buses to rescue stranded commuters.

In May 1977, the MMTC operated a fleet of 609 buses, consisting of 100 Hino Ordinary units, 50 Volvo B57 units, 162 Fiat 331A units, and 147 Ford B-1617 units. The fleet also included 60 Mercedez-Benz buses and 10 Berliet buses of unspecified models. The Love Bus service at the time was served by 100 Hino buses of an unidentified model.

In 1980, MMTC became the first company in the Philippines to operate double-decker buses, using 22 Leyland Atlantean AN68 units configured with 100 seats in a 3x2 arrangement.

The 1984 JUMSUT report estimated that there were 40 double-decker bus units, 370 Love Bus units, and 100 limited bus units in operation as of February of that year.

Between 1986 and 1990, the fleet size of the MMTC decreased from 520 units to 484 units. In 1991, double-decker buses and trailer buses were discontinued by MMTC. In that same year, MMTC acquired 92 Nissan shuttle minibuses manufactured by the Columbian Motors Corporation. These operated on routes connecting Robinsons Galleria in Quezon City to Lagro Subdivision, the SSS Village and city proper in Marikina, and in Rizal province, the municipalities of Angono and Cainta.

By 1992, MMTC operated 475 buses, which increased to 485 units in 1993. Despite the increase, the number of operational vehicles declined from 390 units to 334 units during this period. In 1994, leading up to its privatization, MMTC disposed 197 non-operational units and transferred roughly 200 shuttle buses to private operators.

== Taxi operations ==
MTC Harabas Taksi

In 1975, to address a shortage of taxis, the MTC ventured into taxi operations with an initial fleet of 50 Harabas Taksi taxicabs manufactured by the Francisco Motors Corporation. These were also supplemented by a fleet of 50 Ford Escorts in 1977.

Taxicab drivers were given a chance to own their vehicles through daily installments for a period of two years. Once the installments are paid in full, drivers are invited to join a semi-cooperative plan, where the driver could avail bulk purchases of spare parts and maintenance services from MTC.

At its peak, the MMTC operated a fleet of 248 taxicab units of various models. Taxi operations were eventually phased out in July 1983 and were sold on April 7, 1984 to the Metro Manila Taxi Service Cooperative, a private entity created to assume MMTC's taxi operations.

== Board of directors ==
From 1974 to 1975, the MMTC was governed by a board of directors composed of five ex-officio cabinet members and two presidential appointees.

- Secretary of Public Works, Transportation and Communications or their successor
- Executive Secretary
- Secretary of National Defense
- Secretary of Finance
- Secretary of Industry
- Two additional members appointed by the President of the Philippines, with a term not exceeding two years.

From 1975 to 1980, the board was reorganized to six ex-officio cabinet members and one presidential appointee and was headed by the general manager or governor of the Metro Manila Commission.

- General manager or governor of the Metro Manila Commission (Chairman)
- Secretary of Public Works, Transportation and Communications or their successor (Vice Chairman)
- Secretary of National Defense
- Secretary of Industry
- Secretary of Finance
- Secretary of Public Highways
- One additional member appointed by the President of the Philippines, with a term not exceeding two years.

From 1980 to 1987, the board was reorganized to seven ex-officio cabinet members and was headed by the general manager or governor of the Metro Manila Commission.

- General manager or governor of the Metro Manila Commission (Chairman)
- Minister of Transportation and Communications (Vice Chairman)
- Minister of National Defense
- Minister of Industry
- Minister of Finance
- Minister of Public Highways
- Chairman of the Development Bank of the Philippines

From 1987 until its dissolution, the board had seven ex-officio cabinet members and was headed by the Secretary of Transportation and Communications.

- Secretary of Transportation and Communications (Chairman)
- General manager or governor of the Metro Manila Commission (Vice Chairman)
- Secretary of National Defense
- Secretary of Trade and Industry
- Secretary of Finance
- Secretary of Public Works and Highways
- Chairman of the Development Bank of the Philippines

== Notable incidents ==
- On May 24, 1987, a MMTC bus was grounded and used as a barricade along EDSA during a rally organized by supporters and candidates of the Union for Peace and Progress (UPP) and Kilusang Bagong Lipunan (KBL) parties, who were protesting allegations of electoral fraud in the 1987 Philippine Senate election.
- On June 17, 1992, thousands of MMTC workers conducted a sitdown strike at multiple MMTC depots and terminals due to unpaid rice subsidies, delayed salaries, and alleged graft and corruption in a bus maintenance contract. The strike coincided with work slowdowns at other bus companies, leaving only 20 buses out of over 300 buses operating in Metro Manila, leaving thousands of commuters stranded. The next day, the Quezon City Regional Trial Court granted a petition filed by MMTC president and general manager Antonio Nery to order the workers to put an end to the strike and remove all barricades and picket lines. Nery alleged that the strike had resulted in daily losses amounting to about ₱100,000 (equivalent to ₱397,082 in 2021) and denied the allegations of corruption. He further denounced the strike as "blackmail" and "sabotage" and vowed to press charges against the MMTC workers' union leaders who organized the strike.

=== MMTC v. D.M. Consortium, Inc. ===
In the aftermath of the 1989 Philippine coup attempt against the Aquino administration, bus operators JD Transit, Inc. and DM Consortium Inc. ceased operations, causing disruption to bus services. In response, President Corazon Aquino issued Memorandum Order No. 267 on December 7, 1989, directing the Department of Transportation and Communications to temporarily direct or take over the operations of the two transport companies.

On December 9, 1989, MMTC repossessed DMCI's buses, occupied its offices, and attempted to auction off 228 repossessed buses that it was leasing from MMTC, alleging that DMCI had defaulted on its amortization payments. DMCI responded by filing for a temporary restraining order against the public auction, which was granted on April 11, 1990.

MMTC filed a motion for reconsideration of the restraining order and a petition for certiorari, but these were denied by the courts. In 1995, the Regional Trial Court ruled in favor of DMCI, finding no legal basis for MMTC to repossess the buses or sell them at auction. Both MMTC and DMCI filed motions for reconsideration, with MMTC arguing it was justified to do so under a lease-purchase agreement, while DMCI argued that MMTC did not ensure just compensation as required by MO No. 267. DMCI also sought damages, claiming the buses had deteriorated during the prolonged legal battle.

In 2001, the Court of Appeals upheld the decision against MMTC and ordered additional compensation, including ₱2 million for DMCI's offices. MMTC appealed to the Supreme Court, contesting the ruling on the repossession and the ₱2 million compensation. The Supreme Court denied MMTC's appeal in 2007, affirming the Court of Appeals’ decision.

== See also ==
- History of the Philippines (1965–1986)
- Public Utility Vehicle Modernization Program
- Transportation in the Philippines
- Transportation in Metro Manila
- List of bus companies of the Philippines
- List of bus routes in Metro Manila

Similar state-owned enterprises

- Bangkok Mass Transit Authority
- Land Transport Authority
- Prasarana Malaysia
