= Marcopolo Paradiso =

Bus coach body made in Brazil

Marcopolo Paradiso Series

Overview
- Manufacturer: Marcopolo S.A.
- Also called: Paradiso G4, Paradiso GV, Paradiso G6, Paradiso G7 and Paradiso G8 (Worldwide only) HCM Marcopolo Paradiso Caroline G7 (Diesel and electric bus)
- Production: 1984 — present
- Model years: 1984-present
- Assembly: Caxias do Sul, Brazil

Body and chassis
- Class: High-traffic passenger vehicle
- Layout: Rear-engine, rear-wheel-drive
- Platform: Intercity and highway
- Related: Comil Campione; Marcopolo Viaggio

Powertrain
- Engine: Scania, Volvo, Volkswagen, Mercedes-Benz, Wuzhoulong, Higer, Yutong, Isuzu, HCM Motors, among others

Chronology
- Predecessor: Marcopolo III

The Marcopolo Paradiso is a coach body for medium and long-distance long-distance buses, manufactured by the company from Rio Grande do Sul Marcopolo S.A.. It has been produced since its launch in 1984, on various chassis with rear or mid-engine: Mercedes-Benz, Volvo, Scania and Volkswagen. The model was and is produced in different versions (heights) and has undergone redesigns over time.

== History ==
With the launch slogan "Technological Transportation System," Marcopolo launched new bus bodies in March 1983 for both the intercity and urban segments. This marked the beginning of the company's new product line, which included the Marcopolo Torino, Strada, Viaggio, and the following year, the Paradiso models. The latter, the Paradiso model, was a novelty as it was the company's first Hi-Deck (HD) bus, launched months before the Nielson Diplomata 380, which had a similar height and design. The model was and is produced in different versions (heights) and has undergone redesigns over time.

== Low Driver and double decker Paradiso buses ==
In 1994, the low driver (LD) model was launched, and in 1995, the double decker (DD) model was launched. With almost unprecedented features in the national market, the first consists of a driver's cabin below the passenger compartment, and the second of a larger compartment on the second floor and a smaller one on the first floor, the latter being integrated with the driver's cabin (the "almost" is because in 1988 Thamco had already launched a double-decker model called Thamco Gemini also in the national market.).

== Current models ==
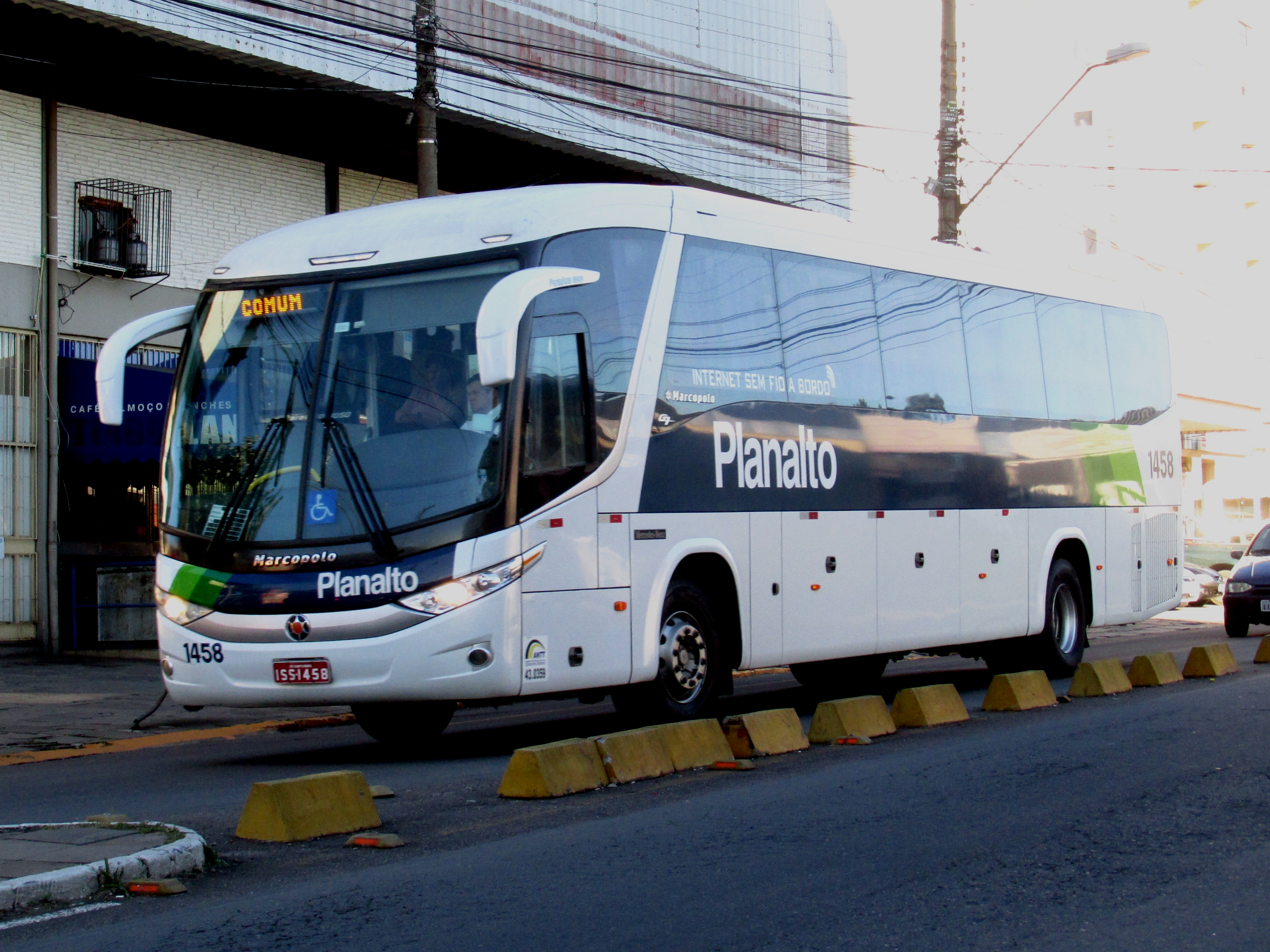
Paradiso G7 1050, the smallest bus of the 7th generation

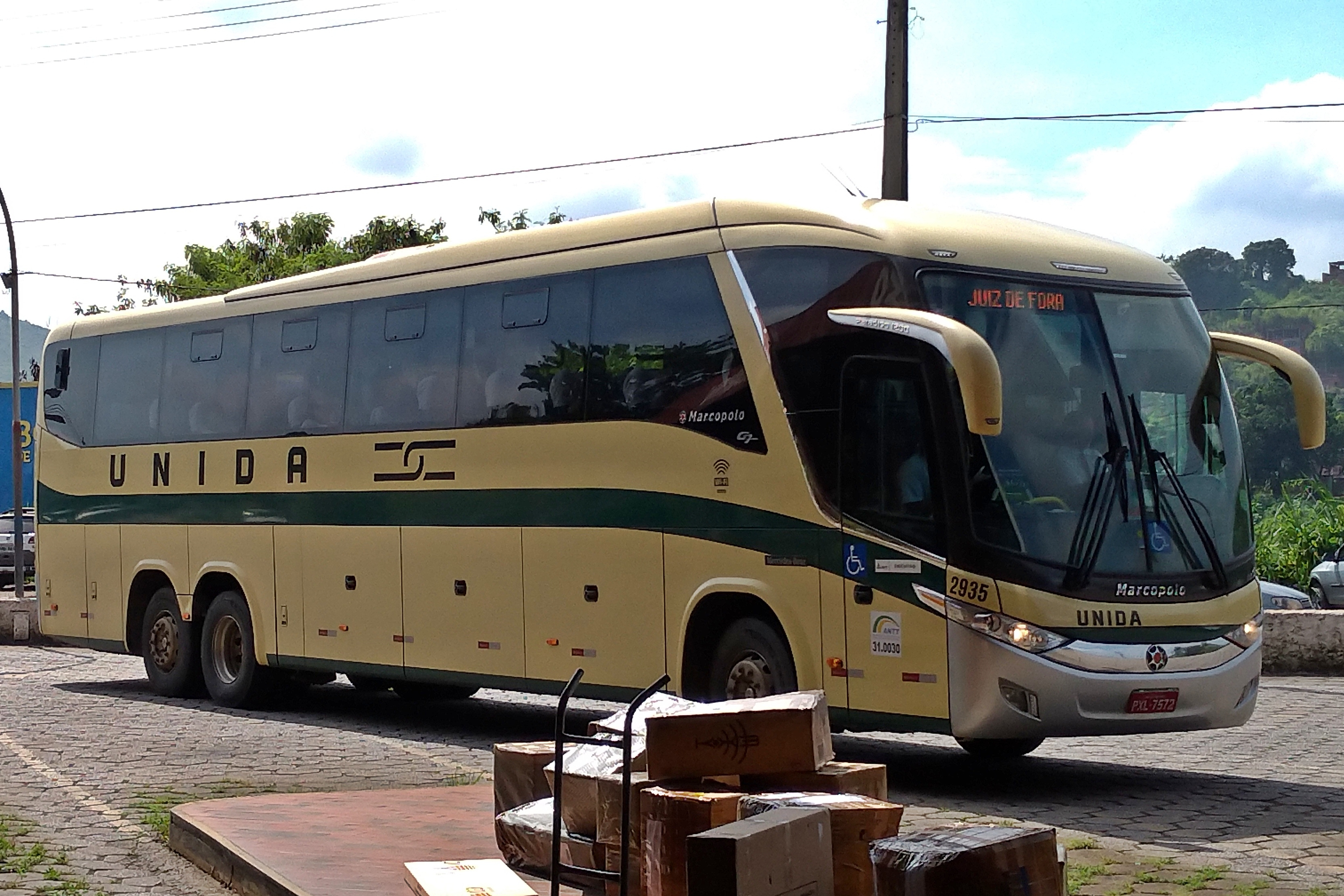
Paradiso G7 1200

Currently, the G7 line has been modernized and undergone a slight edit, becoming the New G7 (From 2018–Present):

- Paradiso 1050 New G7 (2018–present)
- Paradiso 1200 New G7 (2018–present)
- Paradiso 1350 New G7 (2018–present)
- Paradiso 1600 LD New G7 (2018–present)
- Paradiso 1800 DD New G7 (2018–present)

== Marcopolo Paradiso G8 Lineup ==
On July 20, 2021, Marcopolo presented a new generation of the Paradiso, generation 8, which had a renewed look and many other innovations and novelties, safety and much more

- Paradiso 1050 G8 (2021–present)
- Paradiso 1200 G8 (2021–present)
- Paradiso 1350 G8 (2021–present)
- Paradiso 1600 LD (2021–present)
- Paradiso 1800 DD (2021–present)
