= Southeast Metro Manila Expressway =

Highway under construction in the Philippines

Southeast Metro Manila Expressway
- Skyway Stage 4 C-6 Expressway
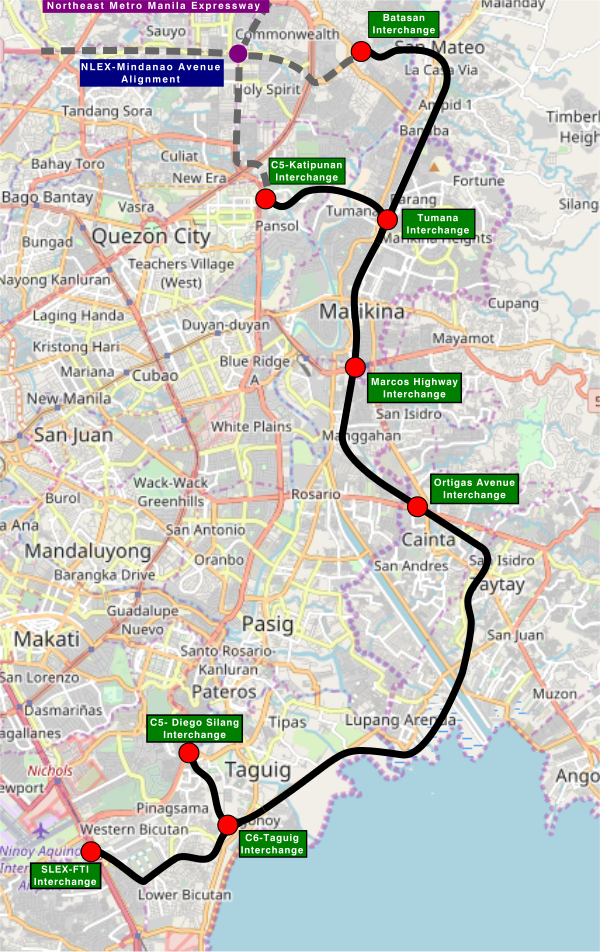

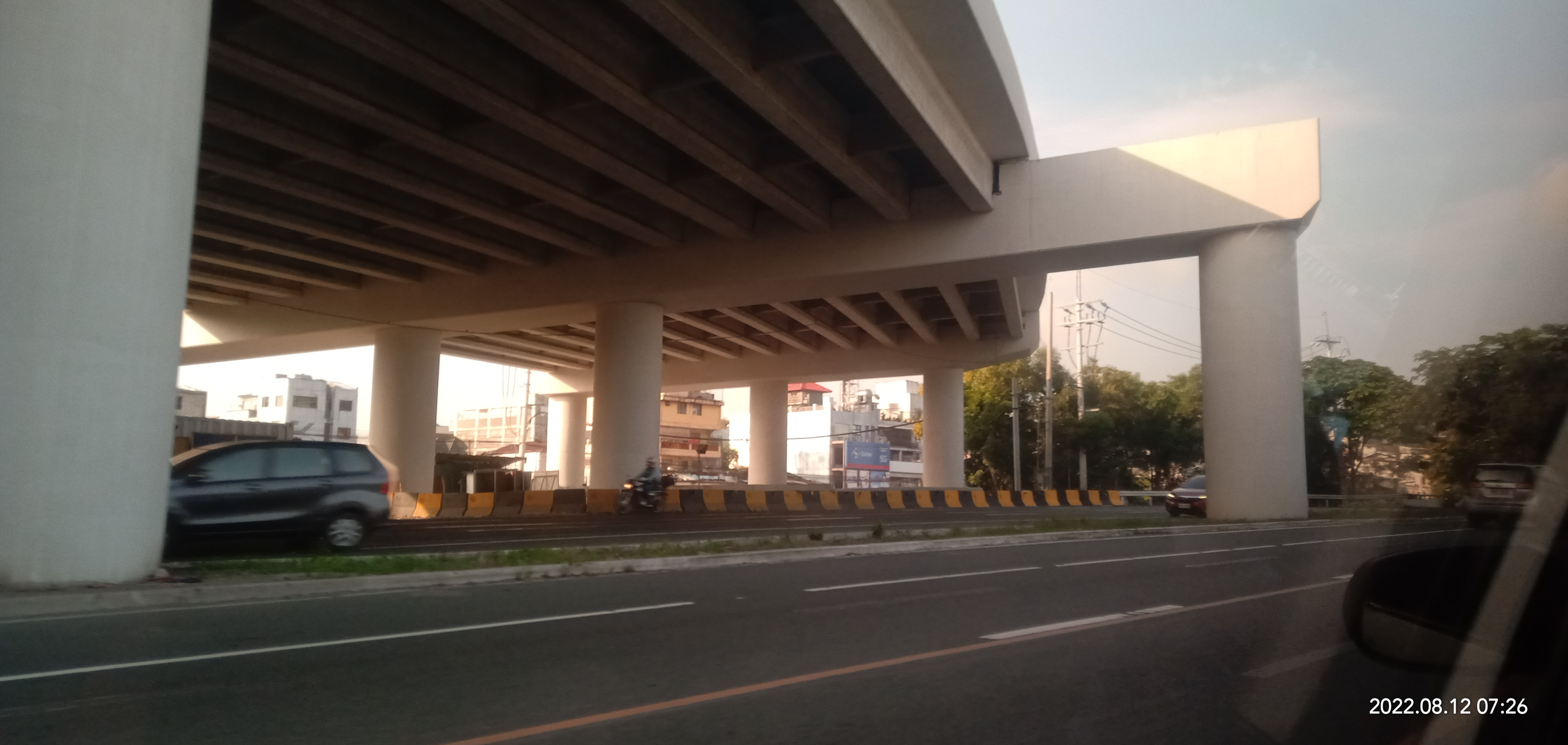
- Construction along Carlos P. Garcia Avenue (C-5) in Taguig as of August 2022

Route information
- Maintained by SMC Skyway Stage 4 Corporation, San Miguel Corporation
- Length: 32.664 km (20.296 mi)
- Component highways: E5

Major junctions
- South end: AH26 (Skyway) at Taguig–Parañaque boundary
- North end: Batasan Road in Quezon City

Location
- Country: Philippines
- Regions: Metro Manila; CALABARZON
- Major cities: Antipolo; Marikina; Pasig; Quezon City; Taguig
- Towns: Cainta; San Mateo; Taytay

Highway system
- Roads in the Philippines; Highways; Expressways; List
← E4	→ E6

The Southeast Metro Manila Expressway (SEMME), also known as Skyway Stage 4, C-6 Expressway and formerly Metro Manila Expressway, is a proposed 32.664-kilometer (20.296 mi) tolled expressway running across eastern Metro Manila and western Rizal. The expressway will help decongest the existing roadways across Metro Manila, such as EDSA and Circumferential Road 5. The expressway is part of the larger Circumferential Road 6 project, expanding from the original C-6 currently passing from General Santos Avenue in Taguig up to Highway 2000 (Phase 1) in Taytay, will expand to Cainta, Pasig, Marikina, San Mateo, and in Quezon City.

The expressway will begin at the Skyway near FTI (now Arca South), Taguig, and end at the Batasang Pambansa Complex in Quezon City. It will also connect to the North Luzon Expressway (NLEX) in Balagtas, Bulacan via a northern spur diverting from the mainline Southeast Metro Manila Expressway.

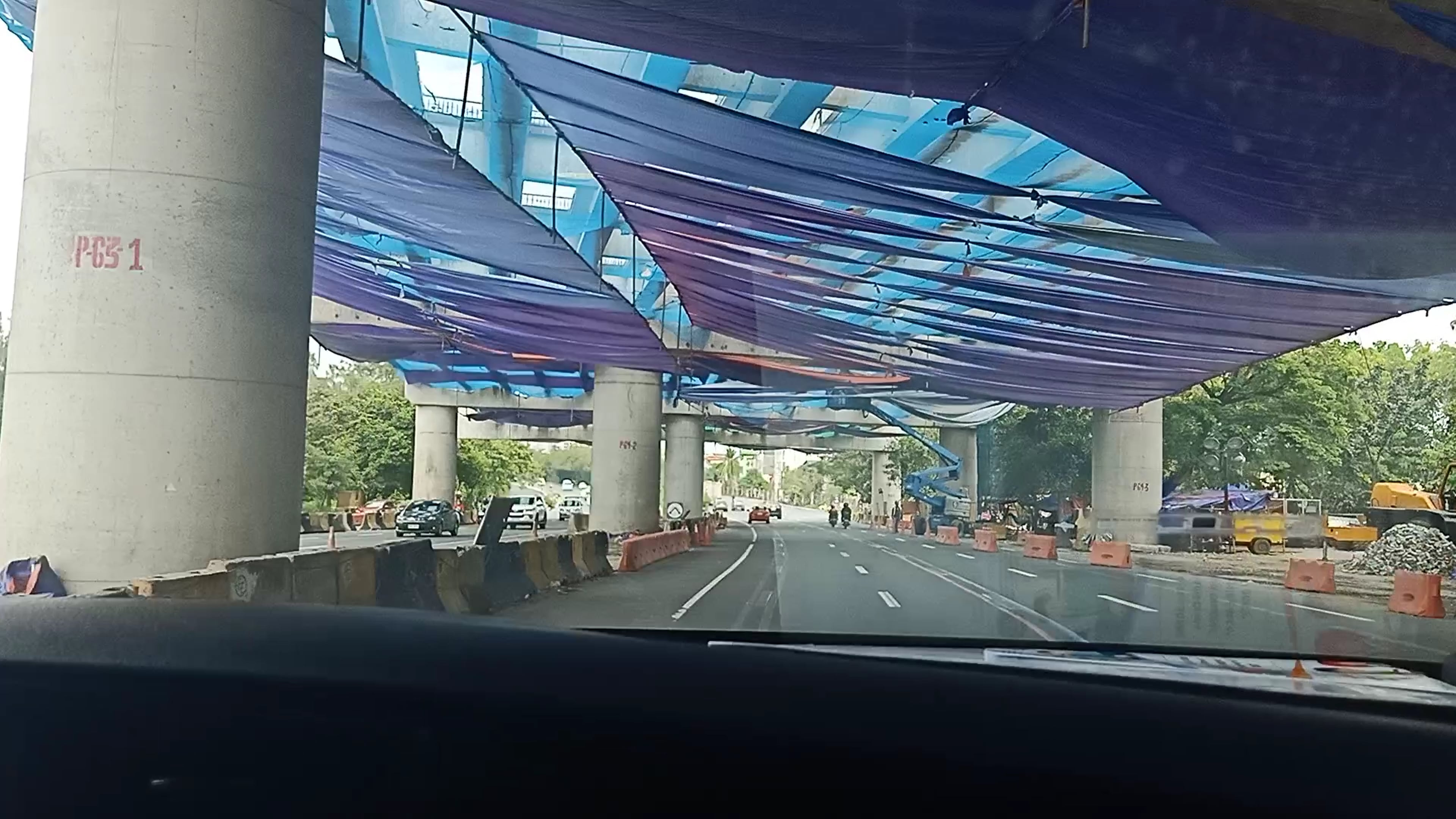
The construction works of SEMME along Carlos P. Garcia Avenue (C-5 Road) in February 2021

The entire expressway will be a future component of Expressway 5 (E5) of the Philippine expressway network.

== History ==
In 1945, the Metropolitan Thoroughfare Plan was submitted by Quezon City planners Louis Croft and Antonio Kayanan, which proposed the laying of 10 radial roads to convey traffic in and out of the city of Manila to the surrounding cities and provinces and the completion of six circumferential roads that will act as beltways of the city, forming altogether a web-like arterial road system, including the sixth circumferential road, which runs from Meycauayan to Las Piñas. In 1973, it was proposed in the Urban Transportation Study in Manila Metropolitan Area (UTSMMA) that a highway be constructed between Navotas and Las Piñas.

In 1983, under the administration of President Ferdinand Marcos, it was proposed that the highway would be a tolled expressway known as the Metro Manila Expressway (MME), and the route would begin at the North Luzon Expressway in Meycauayan and end at the South Luzon Expressway in Bicutan, Parañaque. The total length is approximately 44.570 km. The plan was undertaken by the Philippine National Construction Corporation (PNCC). The proposal was revived in 1993 when PNCC signed an agreement to build the expressway with the Indonesian PT Citra Lamtoro Gung Persada (CITRA).

The agreement was supplemented on February 14, 1994, with a related undertaking by CITRA. CITRA was to provide a preliminary feasibility study on the Metro Manila Skyways (MMS) project, a system of elevated roadway networks passing through the heart of the Metropolitan Manila area. To accelerate the actual implementation of both the MME and the MMS projects, PNCC and CITRA entered into a second agreement. Through that agreement, CITRA committed to finance and undertake the preparation, updating, and revalidation of previous studies on the construction, operation, and maintenance of the projects. According to the CITRA proposal, the planned alignment was to have 38.4 kilometers from Meycauayan to Bicutan, the same route as the 1983 plan, while the remaining segments leading to San Pedro were 18 kilometers and 19 kilometers to Cavite.

In the late 2000s proposal, the Circumferential Road involves a 59.5-kilometer tollway that links the North and South Luzon Expressways via the towns of Rizal and the eastern parts of Metro Manila. This tollway will traverse the cities of San Jose del Monte in Bulacan, Antipolo in Rizal, and Marikina, Taguig, and Muntinlupa in Metro Manila. It shall also pass through the towns of Rodriguez/Montalban, San Mateo, Taytay, and Angono in Rizal and Bacoor, Imus, Kawit, and Noveleta in Cavite. The C-6 project was also included in the 2010 Japan International Cooperation Agency (JICA) study on the High Standard Highway master plan, the feasibility studies undertaken by the Ministry of Economy, Trade, and Industry, the Japan External Trade Organization and the Korean International Cooperation Agency with a full-scale FS.

The plan was launched again in 2014 by Citra, PNCC, and San Miguel Corporation. The Metro Manila Expressway, or C-6 Project, is actually Stage 4 of the South Metro Manila Skyway (SMMS). This toll road will stretch from Bicutan to San Jose Del Monte and will then connect to the proposed MRT-7 Project, which will extend to the NLEX. The toll road will have a length of 34.33 km, 7.62 km of which is the elevated portion, six lanes with six interchanges and 20 ramps, and a close toll collection system. The construction cost is estimated at P19.76 billion out of the total P29.84 billion project cost. The Restated Supplement to the Business and Joint Venture Agreement (Restated Supplement to BJVA) for the MME Project, executed in January 2014, contains the agreement of the parties and embodies the terms and conditions for MME.

The project's groundbreaking ceremony was held on January 8, 2018. The project was scheduled to be completed in 2022, but construction was delayed due to right of way issues for the Taguig segment. In November 2023, Ayala Land signed an agreement with SMC Infrastructure for an integration agreement to link Arca South to the Skyway, and in February 2025, the Department of Transportation signed with the private stakeholders for the Right of Way Usage Agreement.

According to a 2014 supplemental toll operation agreement, the proposed Metro Manila Expressway project was divided into three phases:

- Phase 1 – Southeast Metro Manila Expressway
  - Section 1A: South Metro Manila Skyway to FTI
  - Section 1B: FTI to C-5 / Diego Silang
  - Section 2: C-5 / Diego Silang to C-6 / Taguig
  - Section 3: C-6 / Taguig to Ortigas Avenue Extension
  - Section 4: Ortigas Avenue Extension to Marcos Highway
  - Section 5: Marcos Highway to Tumana Bridge
  - Section 6: Tumana Bridge to Batasan Complex
- Phase 2 – East Metro Manila Expressway
  - Section 1: San Mateo (Sto. Niño) to Montalban, Rizal
  - Section 2: Montalban, Rizal to San Jose del Monte, Bulacan
  - Section 3: Batasan Complex to C-5
  - Section 4: Access to Lower Bicutan, Taguig
- Phase 3 – Northeast Metro Manila Expressway
  - San Jose del Monte, Bulacan to Meycauayan, Bulacan.

The agreement also provided that the updated investment proposal for Phase 2 and the investment proposal for Phase 3 were to be submitted by the investor to the grantor within one year of the execution of the agreement.

== Future exits ==
Exits will be numbered by kilometer posts, with Rizal Park in Manila designated as kilometer zero.

Region	Province	City/Municipality	km	mi	Exit	Name	Destinations	Notes
Metro Manila	Taguig					Skyway - FTI	AH26 (Skyway) – Alabang, Calamba, Makati, Balintawak	Southern terminus
Metro Manila	Taguig					Arca South Eastbound		Eastbound exit and westbound entrance providing access to Arca South and TITX
Metro Manila	Taguig					Arca South Westbound		Westbound exit and eastbound entrance providing access to Arca South and TITX
Metro Manila	Taguig					C-5/Diego Silang	N11 (C-5 Road) – Bonifacio Global City, Pasig	Future temporary northern terminus; northern end of Section 1, also known as Skyway–C-5 Link
Metro Manila	Taguig					C-6 - Taguig	C-6 – Lower Bicutan	Possible future access to the Laguna Lakeshore Road Network (Phase 1) through East Metro Manila Expressway Section 4
Calabarzon	Rizal	Taytay			Manggahan Bridge over the Manggahan Floodway			
Calabarzon	Rizal	Taytay			Viaduct portion above N60 (Ortigas Avenue Extension and interfacing with the future MRT Line 4)			
Calabarzon	Rizal	Taytay				Ortigas Interchange	N60 (Ortigas Avenue Extension) – Angono, Binangonan, Cainta, Ortigas Center	Provides connection to Tikling Junction
Calabarzon	Rizal	Antipolo				Marcos Highway	Marcos Highway	Folded diamond interchange. Access to N59 (Sumulong Highway).
Calabarzon	Rizal	San Mateo				San Mateo	East Metro Manila Expressway – San Jose del Monte	Proposed interchange connecting to a possible future extension towards AH26 (North Luzon Expressway) in Bulacan as Northeast Metro Manila Expressway
Calabarzon	Rizal	San Mateo			San Mateo Toll Plaza			
Calabarzon	Rizal	San Mateo				Tumana Bridge	J.P. Rizal Street	Northbound exit and southbound entrance
Metro Manila	Quezon City					Batasan Complex	Batasan Road	Northern terminus. Access to N170 (Commonwealth Avenue); possible connection to a missing link of C-5 (NLEX Segment 8.2)
1.000 mi = 1.609 km; 1.000 km = 0.621 mi: Unopened

== See also ==
- NLEX Harbor Link
- CAVITEX-C-5 Link
