= G Liner =

Bus company in the Philippines

G Liner Bus Company
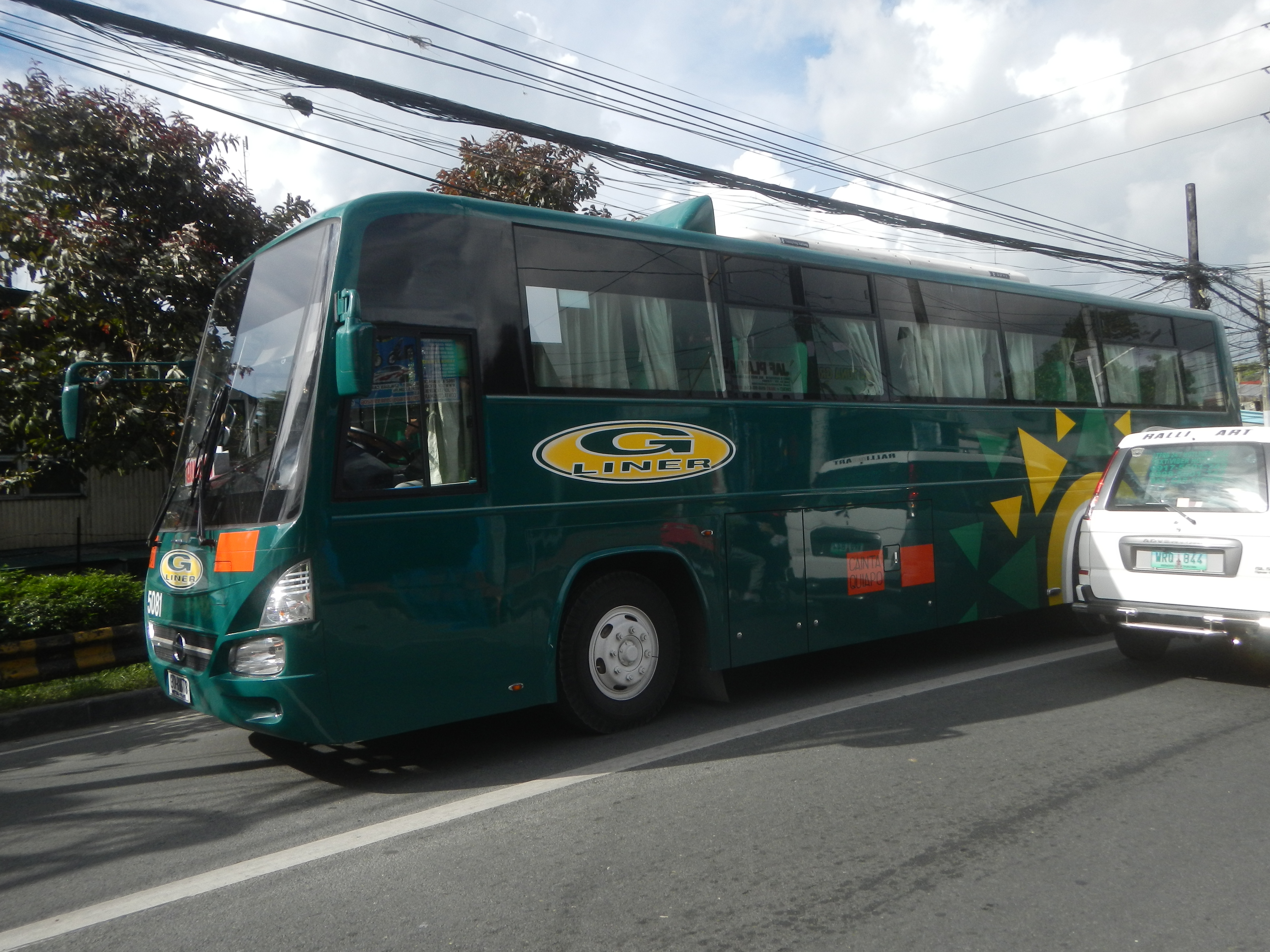
- Founded: 1956; 69 years ago
- Headquarters: Rodriguez Avenue, Barrio Bangiad, Taytay, Rizal, Philippines
- Service area: Antipolo; Angono; Taytay; Cainta; Quiapo, Manila
- Service type: City Operation
- Fleet: 200+ bus units (including ordinary buses from MALTC and EMBC)
- Operator: De Guia Enterprises, Inc.
- Website: www.gliner.com.ph, www.glinerbus.com

De Guia Enterprises, Inc. (G Liner) is one of the oldest city bus companies in the Philippines and is the oldest bus company operating in Manila. The company serves its routes along central Metro Manila areas (along with EMBC) and along EDSA corridor under Marikina Auto Line Transport Corporation (MALTC).

== Etymology ==
The company was named after the de Guia family, who are said to be the founders of the company.

== History ==
On January 1, 1956, De Guia Enterprises, Inc. (G Liner) was formed by Mr. Pedro De Guia, Mrs. Segunda De Guia, Mr. Placido De Guia, Mr. Serafin De Guia, and Mr. Jose Macapagal and was registered with the Securities and Exchange Commission, Manila for the purpose of engaging in the business of motor vehicle in all its phases, branches and sidelines.

On October 22, 1957, De Guia Enterprises, Inc., applied for authority to operate ten additional TPU units on its line Little Baguio-P. Miranda and was approved on February 27, 1958.

To better serve the increasing commuting public on the Crame-Quiapo line, G.Liner petitioned for authority to divert eight of its twenty eight (28) units operating on the line Little-Baguio-Quiapo via P. Guevarra. On the proposed modification of route, the eight (8) autotrucks shall pass from Santolan road, P Guevarra, P. Casal, P. Concepcion, and Arrocerros to Quiapo, Manila. This Petition was granted on March 15, 1963.

On February 12, 1964, De Guia Enterprises, Inc., believing it can render better public service to the people in the area affected, applied with the Public Service Commission for authority to extend its service on the line Little Baguio (San Juan, Rizal) - Barbosa (Quiapo) to the corner of Gilmore Avenue and EDSA operating the same three units already authorized as well as five reserve units.

After Martial Law, the Company suffered great setbacks due to increase in fuel cost of gasoline, without commensurate increase in fare. So, the company decided to dispose gasoline fueled buses.

In 1978, the company started to purchase diesel-fueled brand new Mitsubishi buses until it reached 40 units in the year 1983. The number of units were increased in 1985 when it purchased second hand Mitsubishi Fuso buses, bringing its total 54 units.

In the line with the company's expansion, in 1988, it saw 10 brand new Hino buses and 3 second hand Mitsubishi Fuso buses added to its fleet. Again in 1989, 15 brand new Nissan units were acquired through the Bus Installment Purchase Plan (BIPP 1).

To date with the latest addition of 40 aircon and 20 non-aircon buses, the company's total fleet numbers over a hundred aircon and non-aircon buses. The said units ply between Taytay/Quiapo and Cainta/Quiapo.

Going on its 57th year of operation, De Guia Enterprises, Inc. continues to commit itself to serving the public by providing an efficient, comfortable, and safe service to its riding public.

== Recent updates ==
Last December 2009, G Liner announced the acquisition of Eastern Metropolitan Bus Corporation (EMBC). All city operation bus units and its franchise were taken over by the company due to the latter's focus on tourist chartered and shuttle service. They also acquired the franchise of Marikina Auto Line Transport Corporation (MALTC) and its units. In July 2018, the company started an honesty bus trial where there is no conductor to collect the passengers' fare. However the company ended this program in March 2019 after finding out that around 30% of the passengers did not pay their fare.

== Fleet ==
G Liner has maintained and utilized Hino, Isuzu, Youyi, Ankai, Dongfeng and Wuzhoulong buses, as well as UD Nissan Diesel and Guilin Daewoo Buses, operated by MALTC and EMBC.

- Hino
  - AK174/AK176
  - RF821
  - FG8J
  - RK1JST
- Isuzu
  - CHR660
  - FTR132
  - FTR32/33
  - LT132
  - LT133
- Youyi
  - ZGT6108
- Ankai
  - HFC6108
- Dongfeng
  - EQ6100R
  - DHZ6100L
- Wuzhoulong
  - FDG6111HEVG
- UD Nissan Diesel
  - CPB87
  - PKB212
- Guilin Daewoo
  - GDW6119H2
  - GDW6900K6

== Routes ==
Current

- Angono - Quiapo via Manila East Road, Ortigas Avenue, Magsaysay Blvd. (Route 2)

Former

- Taytay - Quiapo via Manila East Road, Ortigas Avenue, Magsaysay Blvd.
- Cainta - Quiapo via Ortigas Avenue, Magsaysay Blvd.
- Eton Centris, Quezon City - Montalban via Batasan-San Mateo Road (Route 7)
- Cubao, Quezon City - Montalban via Marikina (Route 8)
- Cubao, Quezon City - Antipolo via Sumulong Highway (Route 9)
- Gilmore, Quezon City - Tikling Junction, Taytay via Ortigas Avenue (Route 11)

== Acquisitions ==
Marikina Auto Line Transport Corporation (MALTC)

- Montalban - Baclaran via EDSA, Ayala Avenue, Aurora Blvd., Marikina and vice versa
- San Mateo - Baclaran via EDSA, Ayala Avenue, Commonwealth Avenue, Batasan-San Mateo Road and vice versa
- Navotas - Baclaran, via EDSA, Ayala Avenue, and vice versa
- Eton Centris, Quezon City - Montalban via Batasan-San Mateo Road (Route 7)
- Cubao, Quezon City - Montalban via Marikina (Route 8)
- Montalban - Parañaque Integrated Terminal Exchange via Batasan-San Mateo Road, Quezon Avenue (Route 34)

Eastern Metropolitan Bus Corporation (EMBC) operated by RRCG Transport - They are now focusing on chartered or special trips and shuttle Services.

- Antipolo - Divisoria via Shaw Blvd. (This route was only on before or during morning rush hours using some of their ordinary units that are not used for shuttle services.)
- Siniloan, Laguna - Philippine International Convention Center (PICC) via EDSA - Ayala, Tanay (by RRCG Transport buses).
- Tanay, Rizal - EDSA Crossing Shaw Mandaluyong via Antipolo, Rizal use Rizal MetroLink, Inc.

== See also ==
- List of bus companies of the Philippines
