= Francisco Motors Corporation =

Automotive manufacturing company

- Type: Private
- Industry: Automotive
- Founded: 1947
- Founder: Anastacio Francisco
- Headquarters: Larap Special Economic Zone, Jose Panganiban, Camarines Norte, Bicol Region, Philippines
- Key people: Elmer Francisco (Chairman); Dominic Francisco (Chief Executive Officer)
- Products: Jeepneys, cars, trucks, vans
- Website: franciscomotors.com

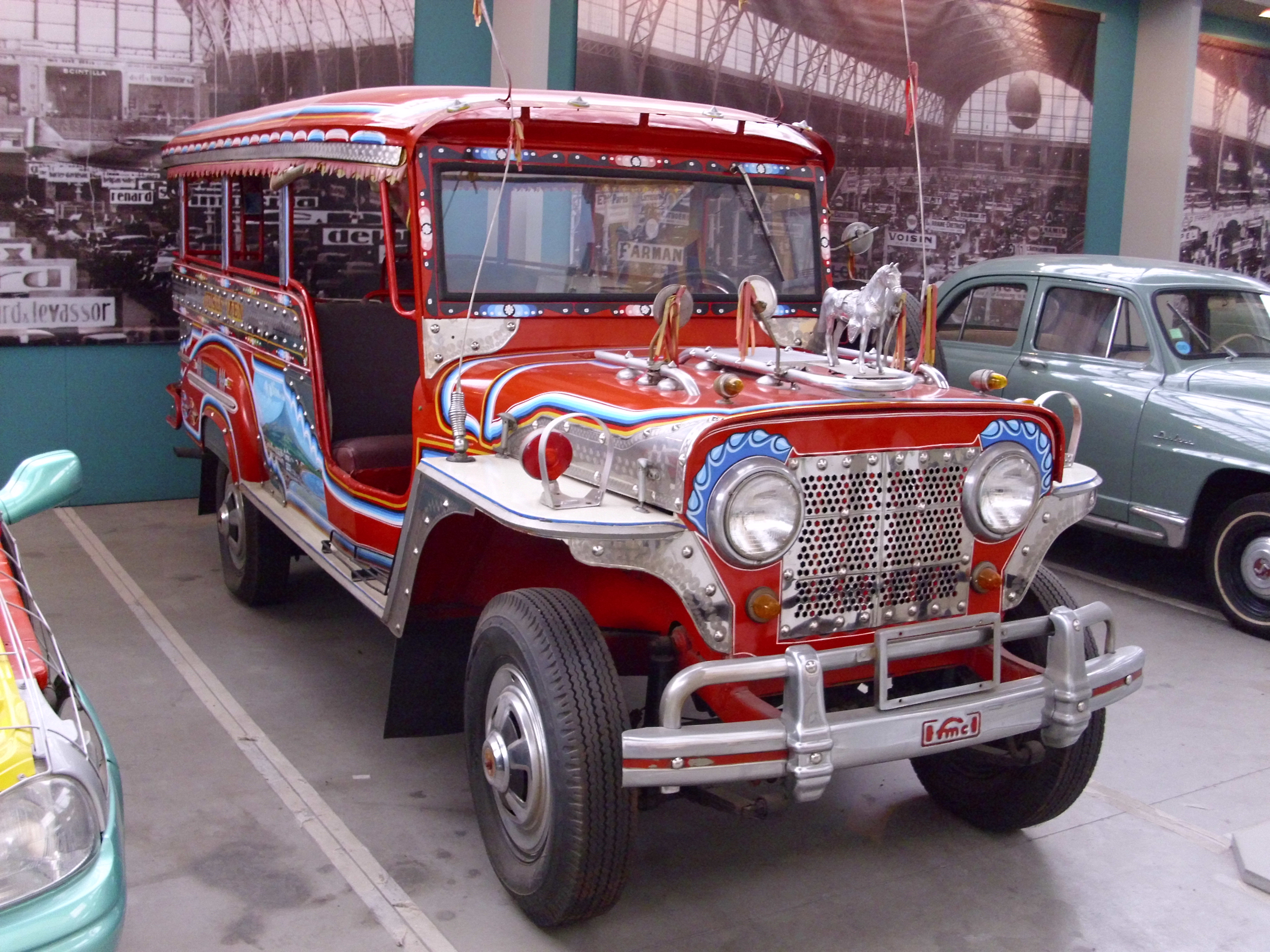
A jeepney made by the Francisco Motors Corporation

Francisco Motors Corporation (FMC) is a Filipino automotive manufacturing company headquartered in Camarines Norte, Bicol Region, Philippines.

FMC is noted for manufacturing jeepneys. Aside from this, they had the right to assemble Mazda pickups and vans and Hyundai vehicles.

== History ==
Francisco Motors was established by local artist and entrepreneur Anastacio Francisco alongside his brothers Fernando Francisco and Jorge Francisco. The company had a starting capital of ₱200 (equivalent to ₱23,212 in 2021) as a small painting shop that expanded into automotive manufacturing by converting leftover United States Army jeeps after World War II into jeepneys.

== Public transport ==
MTC Harabas Taksi

In 1975, FMC provided a fleet of 50 Harabas Taksi taxicabs for the state-run Manila Transit Corporation. The Harabas Taksi was a four-door station wagon basic utility vehicle conceived as a derivative of the GM Harabas manufactured by General Motors as a result of the Progressive Car Manufacturing Program (PCMP) of the Marcos administration.

In December 21, 2023, FMC proposed the creation of a "unli-ride" public transport system with it providing the jeepneys. The state's sovereign wealth fund firm Maharlika Investment Corporation has expressed interest to invest.

== Mazda deal and lawsuit ==
FMC entered a deal with Mazda, when Ford Motors still had a stake in the company, which gave FMC the right to assemble the B25 pick-up and Ford Econovan models until October 2002. However from 1999, FMC and Mazda became involved in a legal dispute with the latter allegedly allowed Ford to assemble Ford Ranger vehicles in the Philippines competing with the original models FMC is supposed to assemble. This was seen as detrimental to FMC.
