= Taguig City Integrated Terminal Exchange =

Proposed transport terminal in the Philippines

General information
- Location: Arca South, Western Bicutan, Taguig; Philippines
- System: Intermodal
- Owner: Arca South Integrated Terminal, Inc

History
- Opening: 2028

Passengers
- 160,000 (projected)

The Taguig City Integrated Terminal Exchange (TCITX), originally conceptualized as the South Integrated Transport System (ITS-South), is a proposed intermodal transport terminal in Arca South, Taguig. It is primarily a bus terminal for buses going to and from Southern Luzon, Visayas, and Mindanao but connected to the FTI station of the under-construction Metro Manila Subway and the North–South Commuter Railway, as well as the Southeast Metro Manila Expressway. Originally scheduled for completion by 2022, construction has yet to begin as pre-construction activities were temporarily suspended due to the ongoing COVID-19 pandemic, but it was lifted in July 2023.

== History ==
In August 2014, five companies bought bid documents for a public-private partnership project of proposed integrated transport terminal in FTI. The five companies were given until October 2014 to submit their bids to finance, build, operate, and maintain the proposed terminal. It was then announced in January 2016 that Ayala Land won the project in November 2015.

=== Construction ===
Initially, the construction was supposed to begin in September 2016, but the groundbreaking ceremony was held in January 2018. The project would cost at least ₱5.20 billion and was expected to be operational by 2020. However, pre-construction activities were temporarily suspended due to the COVID-19 pandemic. Groundbreaking was initially scheduled in December 2024, but actual groundbreaking was held on February 3, 2025, which brought heavy traffic as the East Service Road portion in Western Bicutan was closed for the ceremony. Construction of the terminal exchange is expected to begin in the second quarter of 2026, following the resolution of right-of-way issues with the Southeast Metro Manila Expressway project traversing above it, and be finished by 2027 for operations to start by early 2028.
