= Eastern Metropolitan Bus Corporation =

- Founded: 1970; 56 years ago
- Headquarters: P. Oliveros St., Antipolo, Rizal
- Service area: Metro Manila; Rizal Province
- Service type: City Operation; Shuttle Service; Tourist Chartered Service
- Alliance: Rizal MetroLink Inc.
- Routes: Antipolo-Divisoria via Shaw Boulevard; Tanay-EDSA Crossing via Manila East Road; Siniloan – PICC via Edsa Ayala Buendia Tanay Antipolo Crossing Kapitolyo
- Fleet: 200+ Buses (Hino, Mitsubish Fuso, Nissan Diesel, Isuzu, Japayuki units, Daewoo, UD Nissan Diesel, Kia, King Long, Higer, Volvo and Yutong)
- Operator: Eastern Metropolitan Bus Corporation (EMBC)

Eastern Metropolitan Bus Corporation or EMBC is one of the largest bus companies in the Philippines. The city operation plies routes from Antipolo, Rizal to Divisoria, Manila via Shaw Boulevard Ortigas Avenue. This bus company also offers tourist chartered and shuttle services.

== History ==
Established in the 1970s by its late founder, Francisco Lim de Jesus, the company started as city operation along EDSA corridor through Baclaran-Letre-Navotas route.

In the mid-1990s, the Baclaran-Letre-Navotas route was retired. The company transferred the route into Antipolo-Baclaran via EDSA Ayala Avenue Shaw Boulevard before fully transferring its route into Antipolo-Divisoria.

EMBC has opened a tourist chartered service somewhere in the mid-90s. They also offer shuttle services using ordinary and air-conditioned buses for employees of some companies that are situated in Rizal province.

In December 2009, G Liner announced the acquisition of EMBC with only city operation bus units and its franchise due to focus of EMBC management on tourist chartered and shuttle services.

In January 2012, EMBC and RRCG transport formed the Siniloan (Laguna) – Philippine International Convention Center (PICC) via EDSA Buendia Tanay Antipolo Crossing Kapitolyo route.

== Fleet ==
EMBC maintains Hino, Mitsubishi Fuso, as well as some aging Japanese units, some of which are air-conditioned units, and they were used for both city operation and shuttle service. All air-conditioned units were used as tourist chartered services, which the company utilizes almost of the same units as that of city operation. Plus, the new Daewoo bus BAR units of RRCG. And now its Rizal MetroLink Inc.

== Destinations ==
=== Metro Manila ===
- Divisoria, Manila
- Quiapo, Manila
- Lawton, Manila
- EDSA Shaw/Crossing, Mandaluyong
- Ayala, Makati*
- Leveriza, Pasay*
- Buendia Avenue (Gil Puyat Avenue), Makati*
- EDSA Cubao Quezon City*
- Jose Rizal University, Mandaluyong

=== Provincial Destinations ===
- Antipolo, Rizal*
- Tanay, Rizal*
- Teresa, Rizal*
- Baras, Rizal*
- Morong, Rizal*
- Taytay, Rizal*
- Cainta, Rizal*
- Angono, Rizal*
- Binangonan, Rizal*
- Cardona, Rizal*
- San Mateo, Rizal*
- Rodriguez, Rizal*
- Pililla, Rizal*
- Jalajala, Rizal*
- Mabitac, Laguna*
- Siniloan, Laguna*
- Famy, Laguna*
- Santa Maria, Laguna* (pass through via Siniloan)
- Turbina, Calamba, Laguna*
- Lipa City, Batangas City* in front of SM Lipa Grand Terminal via Turbina or ACTEX
- Malvar, Batangas* (Malvar-Lipa Border near Lima Park Hotel)
- Santo Tomas, Batangas* (via JP Laurel Highway Tanauan City)
- Tanauan City, Batangas City*
- Batangas City via MMSS SLEX ACTEX only* operated by Southern Carrier and RRCG Transport

(*) in partnership with RRCG.

=== Premium Point to Point Bus Service ===
Route: Robinsons Place Antipolo – SM City Masinag via vice veresa

=== Former Destinations ===
- Baclaran, Parañaque
- Alabang, Muntinlupa
- Navotas Bus Terminal, Navotas
- SM City Fairview, Quezon City

== In media ==
- In a Filipino indie film, "Still Life" (2007), Glaiza de Castro's role waits on the terminal for a bus to ride. She died when a bus runs her over.

== See also ==
- List of bus companies of the Philippines
