= Arca South =

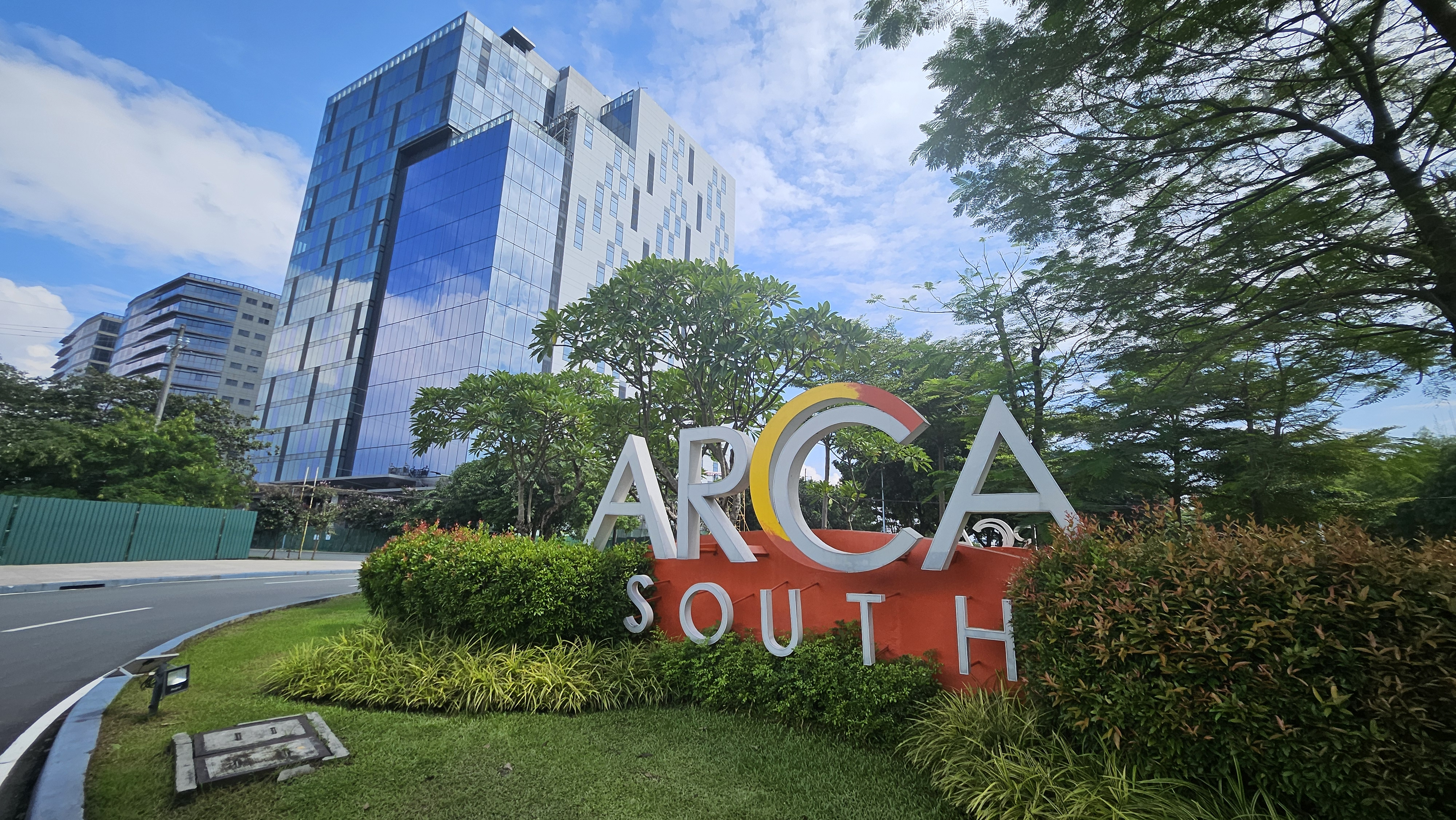
- Arca South in 2025 with Bamberton Center and Savya Financial Center office buildings

Project
- Opening date: 2012 (as Arca South)
- Developer: Ayala Land
- Owner: Ayala Land
- Website: arcasouth.ph

Physical features
- Transport: FTI; AS01 Arca South; Future: MMS FTI; NSCR FTI; Taguig Integrated Terminal Exchange; Southeast Metro Manila Expressway

Location
- Location in Metro Manila Location in Luzon Location in the Philippines
- Coordinates: 14°30′20.00″N 121°2′38.80″E
- Country: Philippines
- Location: Taguig, Metro Manila
- Address: Western Bicutan, Taguig 1630

Arca South is a 74-hectare (180-acre) mixed-use estate by Ayala Land, Inc. located at East Service Road, Barangay Western Bicutan, Taguig, Philippines. The site was formerly part of the massive Food Terminal Inc., before a large part of it was sold to Ayala Land in 2013.

== History ==
With the decline of FTI, established in 1974, there have been several attempts over multiple Philippines presidential administrations to sell off part of the property, including a public auction in 2009, but they all failed.

In November 2012, the Philippine government announced the sale of the 74 hectares (180 acres) or 62% of the 120-hectare (300-acre) property to Ayala Land, Inc. for ₱24.3 billion. Ayala plans to turn the property into a mixed-use development. Proceeds from the sale are pledged to the programs of the Department of Agriculture and the Department of Agrarian Reform. The remaining 46 hectares (110 acres) remains in FTI. In 2013, Ayala Land renamed their property into Arca South.

== Current developments ==
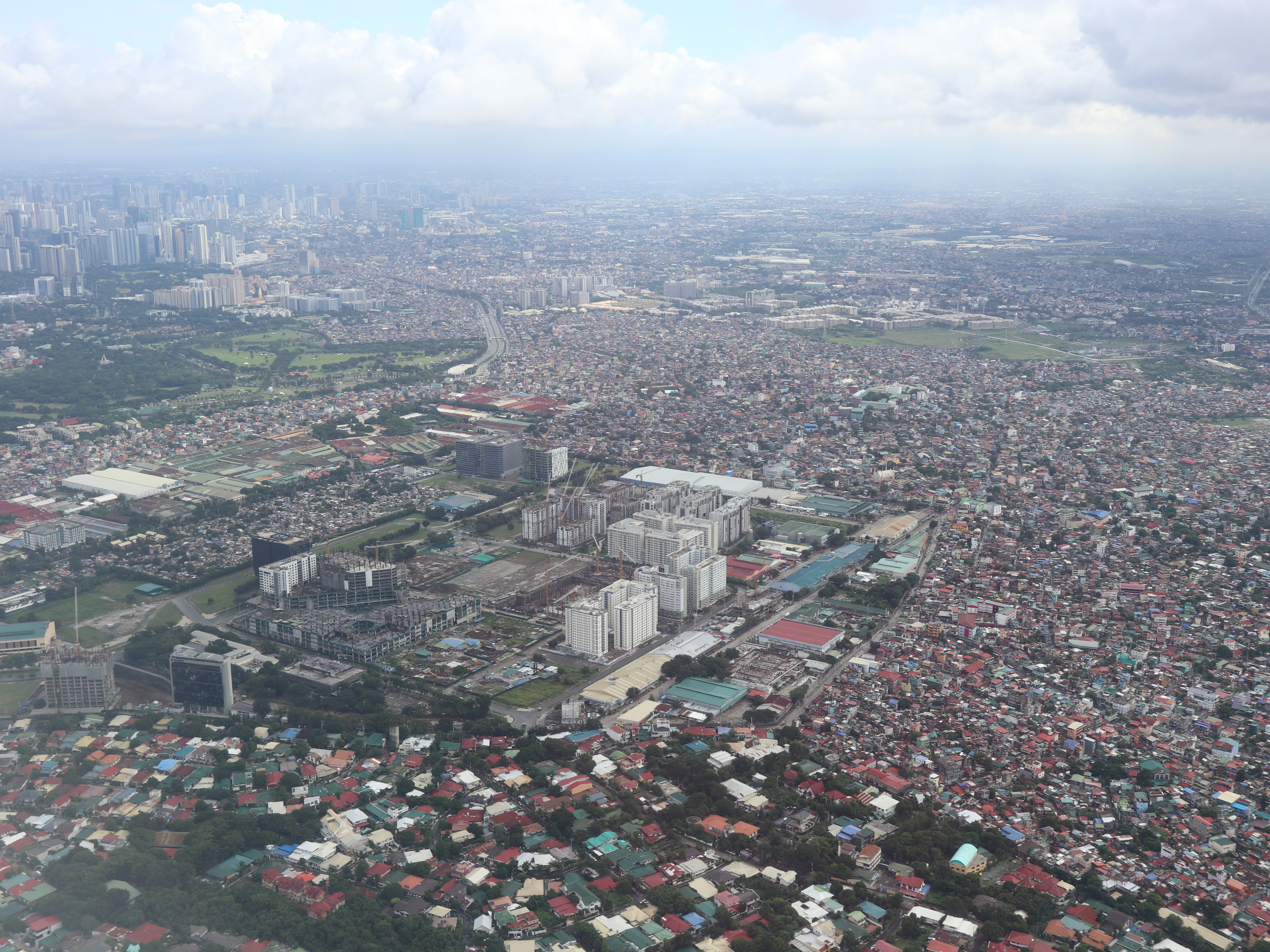
Aerial view of Arca South and surrounding communities in 2022

=== Residential ===
Ayala Land Premier

- Arbor Lanes
- Gardencourt Residences

Alveo Land

- The Veranda
- Park Cascades
- Tryne Residences

Avida Land

- Avida Towers One Union Place
- Avida Towers Vireo

=== Commercial/Institutional ===
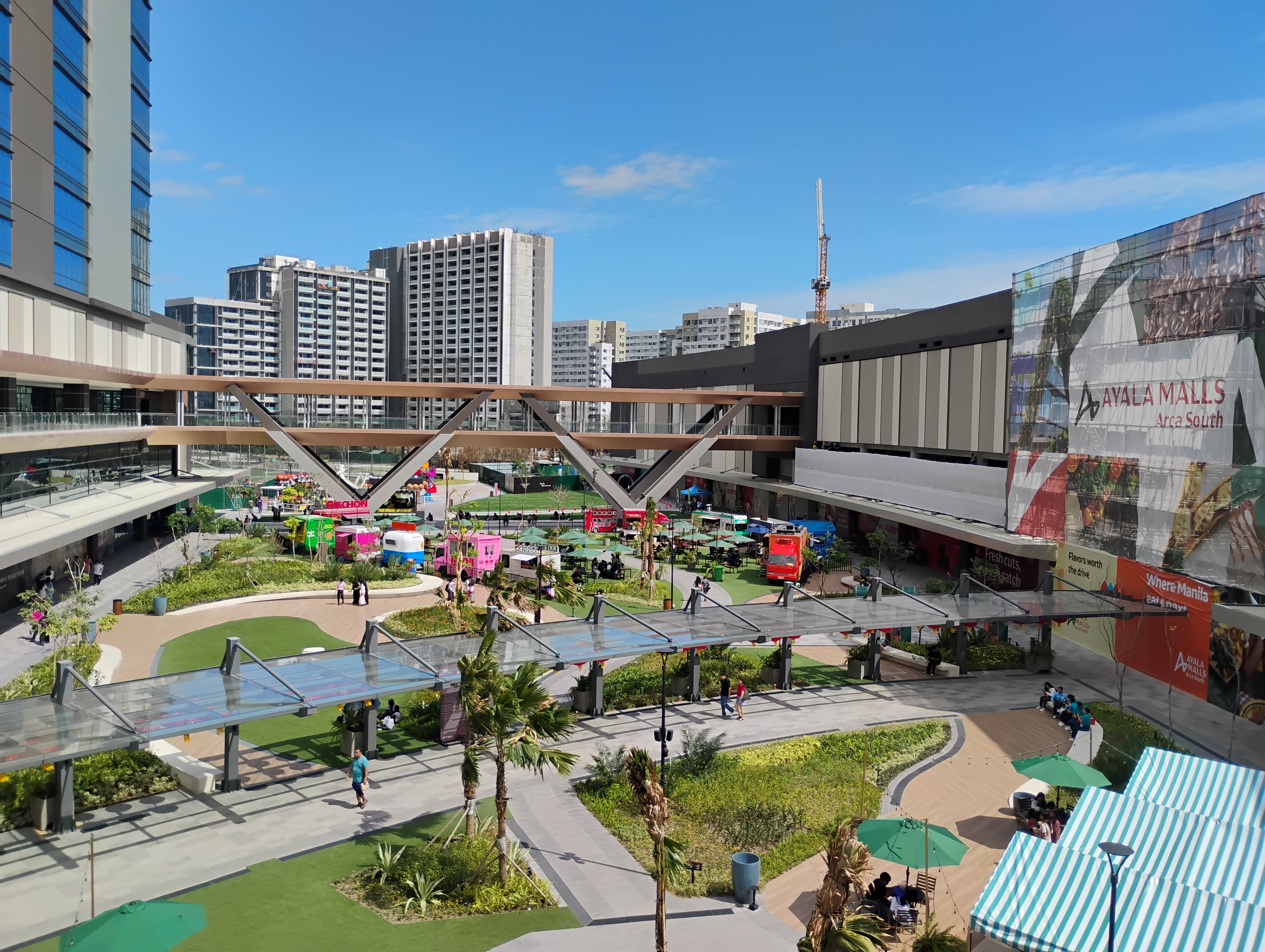
Ayala Malls Arca South

- Agri-Aqua Network International (AANI) Weekend Market
- Arca Main Street
- Arca South Corporate Center
- Ayala Malls Arca South
- Landers Superstore Arca South
- Sunshine Mall (closed in December 2025)
- Tryne Enterprise Plaza
- Makati Development Corporation (MDC) Headquarters
- Savya Financial Center
- Bamberton Center
- Z2 Tower
- Manta Corporate Plaza
- Healthway Cancer Care Hospital
- Seda Hotel
- Arca South Pitch

== Transportation ==
=== Land ===
The planned North–South Commuter Railway and Metro Manila Subway's FTI station will be connected to the Taguig City Integrated Terminal Exchange (TCITX), which is located in Arca South.

In addition to its surrounding access roads, particularly those connecting it with the East Service Road, Arca South is also expected to be served by the Skyway-FTI Interchange of the Southeast Metro Manila Expressway, which will also connect it to the Skyway.

The two-hectare Arca South Transport Terminal, operated by ALI partner Interlux Corporation is designed as an access to Arca South estate while the TCITX is under construction.
