= Food Terminal Inc. =

Government owned-and-controlled food corporation in the Philippines

Food Terminal Incorporated (FTI)
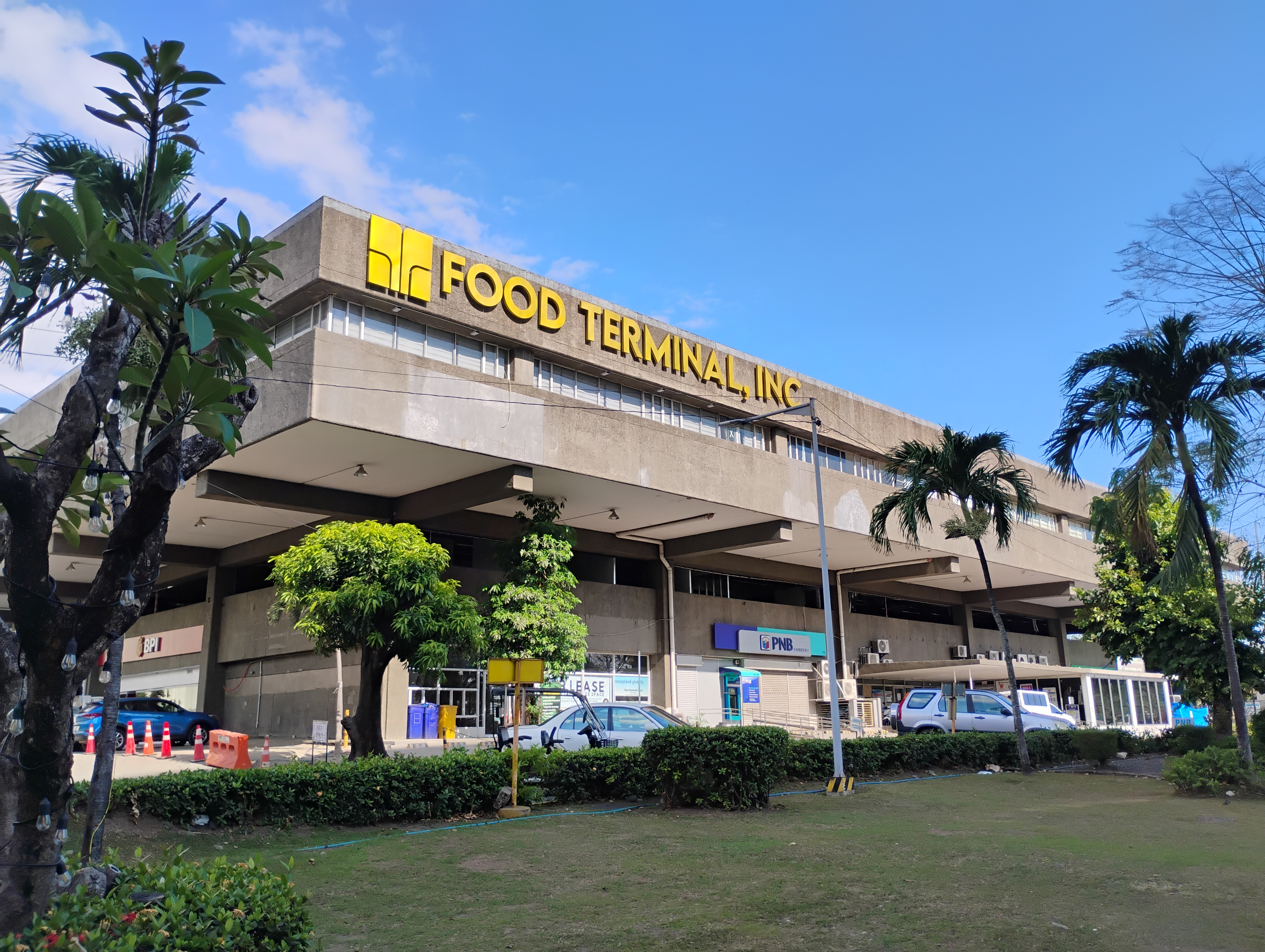
- FTI Main Building in Arca South, Taguig
- Formerly: Greater Manila Terminal Food Market (GMTFM)
- Type: Government-owned and controlled corporation (from 1980)
- Industry: Industrial and agricultural enterprises
- Founded: April 30, 1968; 58 years ago (as Greater Manila Terminal Food Market); March 27, 1974; 52 years ago (as Food Terminal Incorporated)
- Founder: Ferdinand Marcos
- Headquarters: Western Bicutan, Taguig, Philippines
- Area served: Metro Manila, Nationwide (planned)
- Key people: Porferio E. Mah (Chairman); Joseph Rudolph Lo (President and CEO)
- Revenue: ▲ ₱276 million (2018); ₱259 million (2017)
- Owner: National Food Authority
- Website: fti.gov.ph

Food Terminal Incorporated (FTI) is a government-owned and controlled corporation (GOCC) focused on food processing and distribution in the Philippines. Headquartered in Western Bicutan, Taguig, it also operated a 120 hectares (297 acres) industrial estate that leased lots to small and medium-sized enterprises engaged in agricultural development, electronic raw materials, and other business endeavors. Of this, 76 hectares (188 acres) were sold to Ayala Land and are now part of Arca South. FTI is a major subsidiary agency of the National Food Authority (NFA).

== History ==
It was a priority project of then Philippine President Ferdinand Marcos to revolutionize the agricultural sector of the country, and establish a food consolidation centre. By the power a Presidential decree issued in January 1967, it took about more than a year to establish what was called the Greater Manila Terminal Food Market (GMTFM) on April 30, 1968. However, the estate was renamed to Food Terminal Incorporated (FTI) on March 27, 1974.

The company’s major activities include warehousing, food processing, research and quality control, marketing services, and trading.

In April 1979, the Human Settlements Development Corporation took over the ownership and management of the company. FTI became a major subsidiary agency of the National Food Authority (NFA).

=== Decline ===
On 1989, food trading and food processing operations, including live animal slaughtering, were suspended. Cold storage services were also suspended in 2004 due to technical problems and viability concerns.

There have been several attempts over multiple Philippines presidential administrations to sell off part of the property, including a public auction in 2009, but they all failed. In November 2012, the Philippine government announced the sale of the 74 hectares (183 acres) of the 120 hectares (297 acres) property to Ayala Land, Inc. (ALI) for ₱24.3 billion. Ayala plans to turn the property into a mixed-use development, now known as Arca South. Proceeds from the sale are pledged to the programmes of the Department of Agriculture and the Department of Agrarian Reform. The remaining 46 hectares (114 acres) remains in FTI.

=== Revival ===
FTI will be revived by the Department of Agriculture (DA), with its reopening in Taguig. FTI still has a 36-hectare (89-acre) area available, with 11 hectares (27 acres) occupied by informal settlers. The new FTI will feature food processing and cold storage facilities for produce to be sold to various consumer and vendor associations.

According to Agriculture Secretary Emmanuel Piñol, FTI will own logistics equipment to transfer goods from regional food terminals to markets, with a total of six food terminals to be built during President Rodrigo Duterte's term.

FTI aims to be the leading food processing and distribution hub in the Philippines by 2030.

== Current developments ==
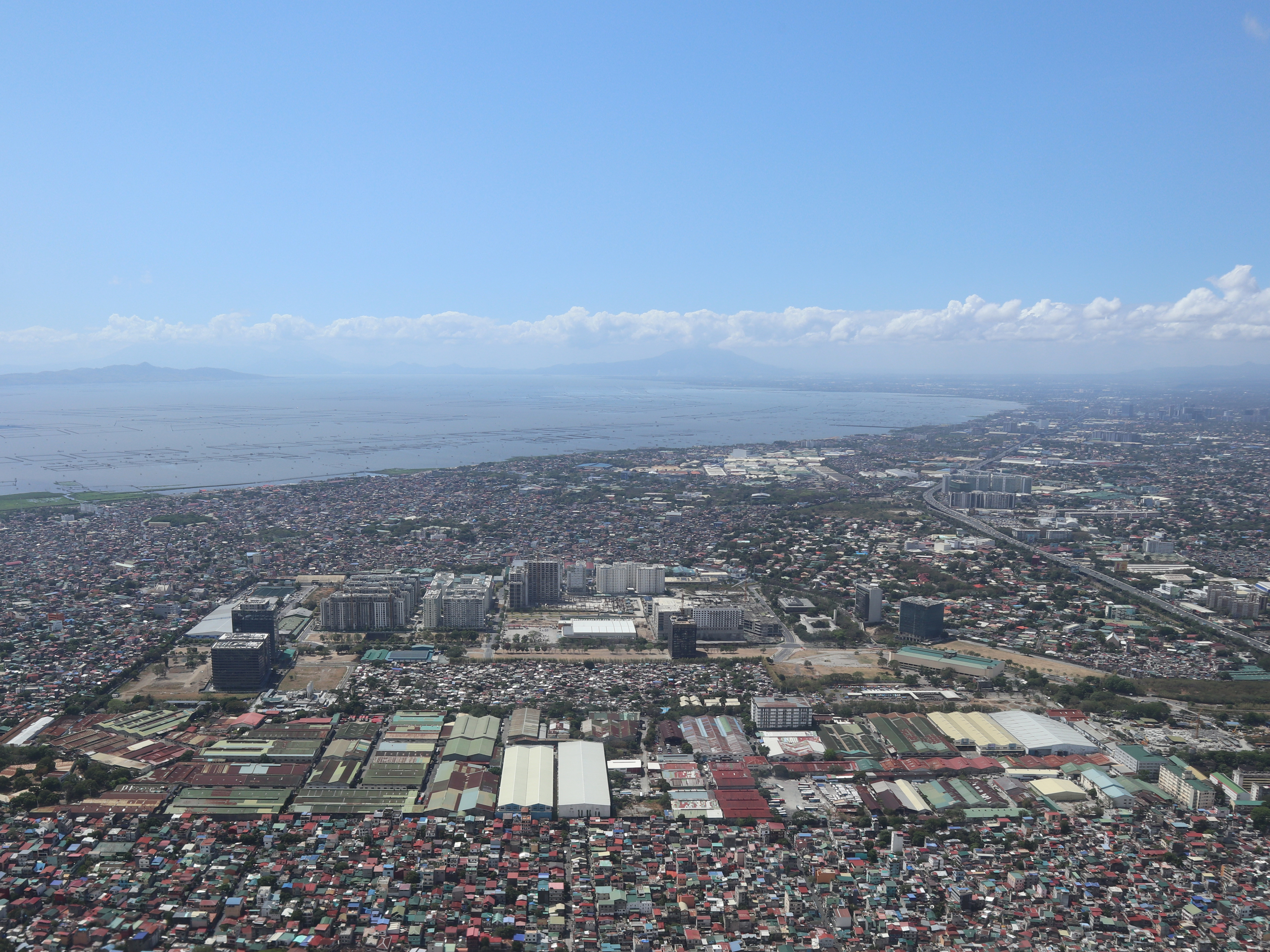
Aerial view of FTI Complex and surrounding communities

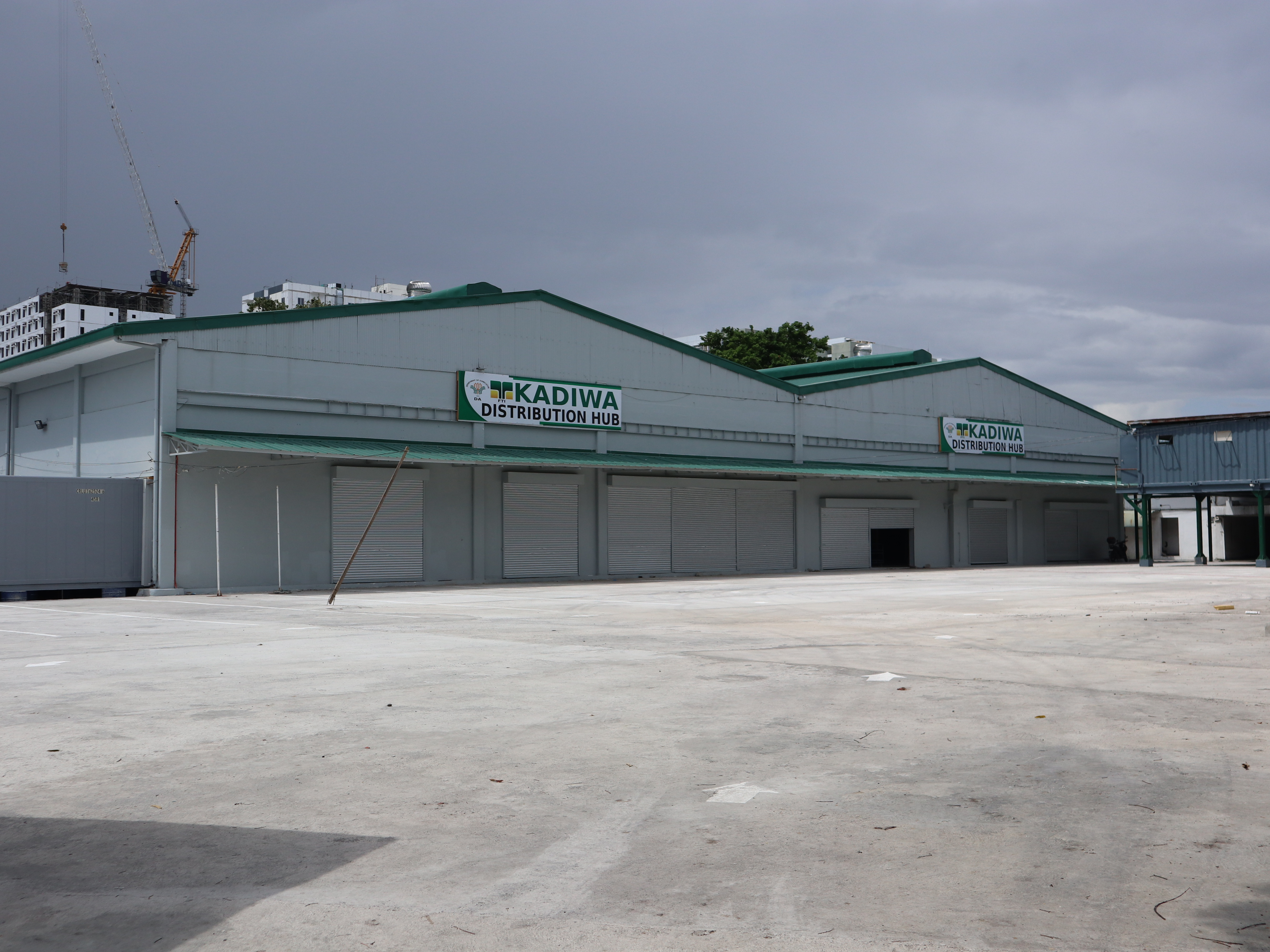
FTI Kadiwa Distribution Hub in Taguig

=== Arca South ===
Arca South is a mixed-use development owned by Ayala Land, Inc. occupying 74 hectares (183 acres) or 61.67% out of the 120 hectares (297 acres) of FTI.

=== FTI Special Economic Zone ===
The FTI Special Economic Zone is a special economic zone located in Taguig. It houses industrial and retail enterprises as well as government offices such as:

- Air Liquide
- Continental
- Dizon Farm
- Hi-Las Corporation
- Keba
- Land Transportation Office (Taguig extension)
- PSi Technologies Inc. (extension office)
- Team Pacific Corporation
- Puregold FTI
- SM Hypermarket FTI
- Temic
- Vishay Philippines Inc.

=== Other ===
==== FTI Corporate Center ====
The new FTI Corporate Center will house government offices. It will also be a commercial and office property for lease.

==== Regional Food Terminals (RFT) ====
Six regional food terminals will be established. These terminals are to be constructed in Luzon, Visayas, Mindanao, and Metro Manila.
