= Wuzhoulong =

Chinese bus manufacturer

Wuzhoulong Motors
- Founded: 2000
- Headquarters: Shenzhen, China
- Products: buses
- Production output: 30,000 annually
- Number of employees: 5,000
- Divisions: Shenyang Wuzhoulong New Energy Motors Co., Ltd. Chongqing Wuzhoulong New Energy Automobile Co., Ltd. Guangdong Wuzhoulong Power Technology Co., Ltd.
- Website: http://www.wzlmotors.cn/

Wuzhoulong Motors is a bus and coaches manufacturer in Shenzhen, China. Founded in 2000, it has divisions in Chongqing, Shenyang and Guangdong. Wuzhoulong has the capacity to manufacture up to 30,000 buses annually, with 5,000 employees. The company produces buses with plug-in electric, hybrid and combustion engines.

In October 2002, China's first hybrid bus prototype "China No. 1" was successfully developed by Fidelity Enterprises Group.

In December 2003, Zhang Jingxin moved the Fidelity Enterprise Group from Jieyang to Shenzhen and registered it as Shenzhen Wuzhoulong Automobile Co., Ltd.

In November 2005, with the special permission of the Shenzhen Municipal Government, seven Wuzhoulong hybrid buses were put into operation in Pingshan, Longgang District, Shenzhen, marking the beginning of the commercial demonstration operation of new energy vehicles in China.

In August 2011, during the 26th Universiade, Shenzhen launched 2,011 new energy vehicles of various types, of which Wuzhoulong Company launched 1,511 vehicles, accounting for 75% of the total.

== Models ==
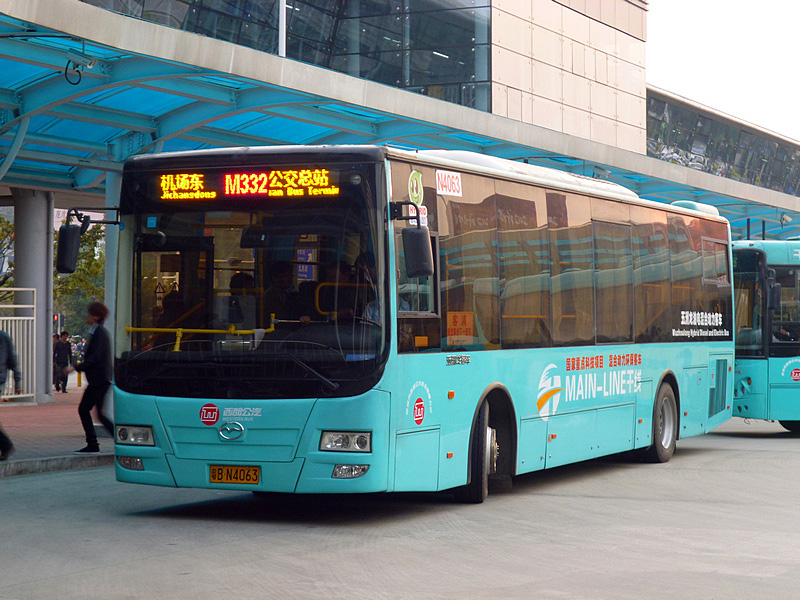

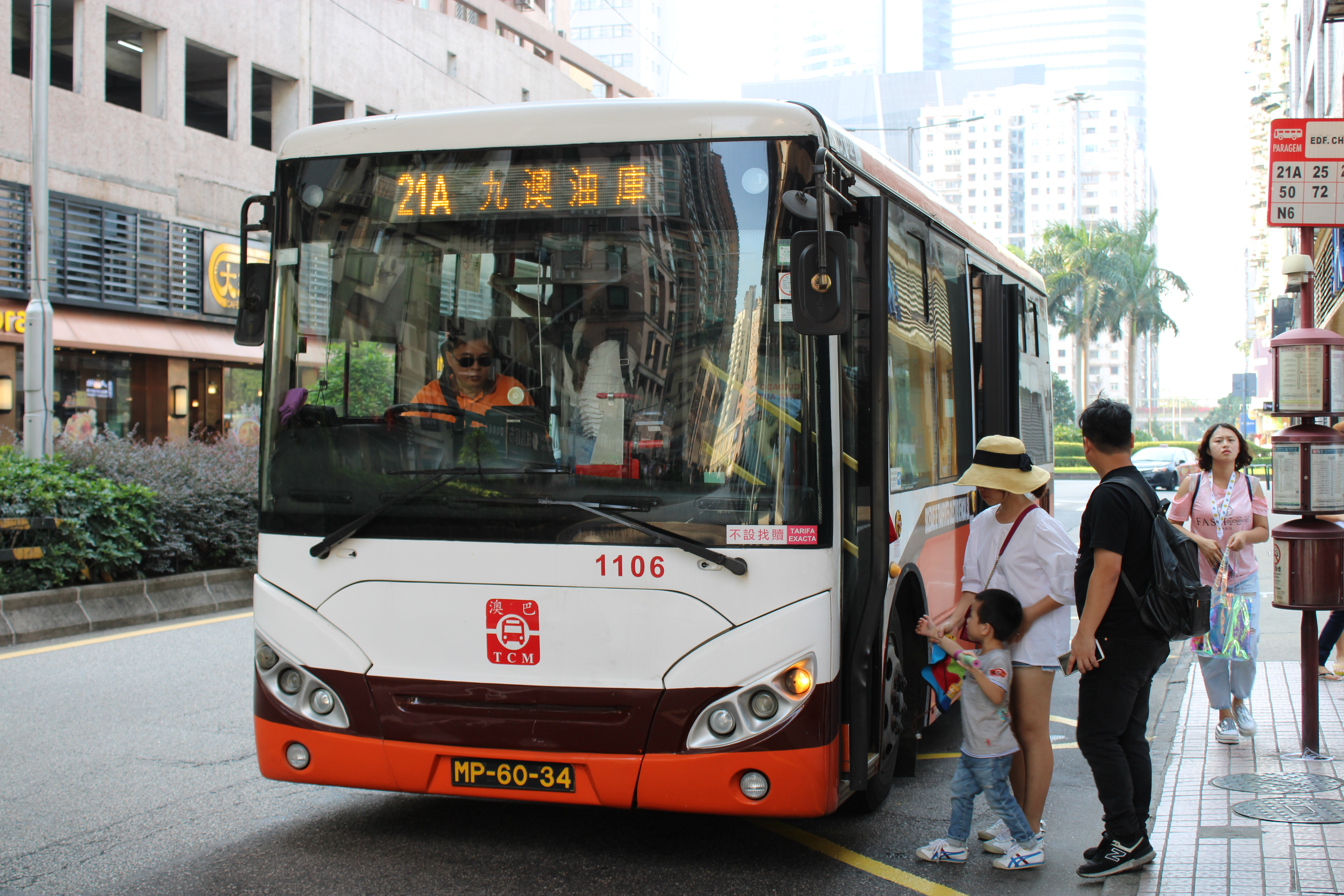

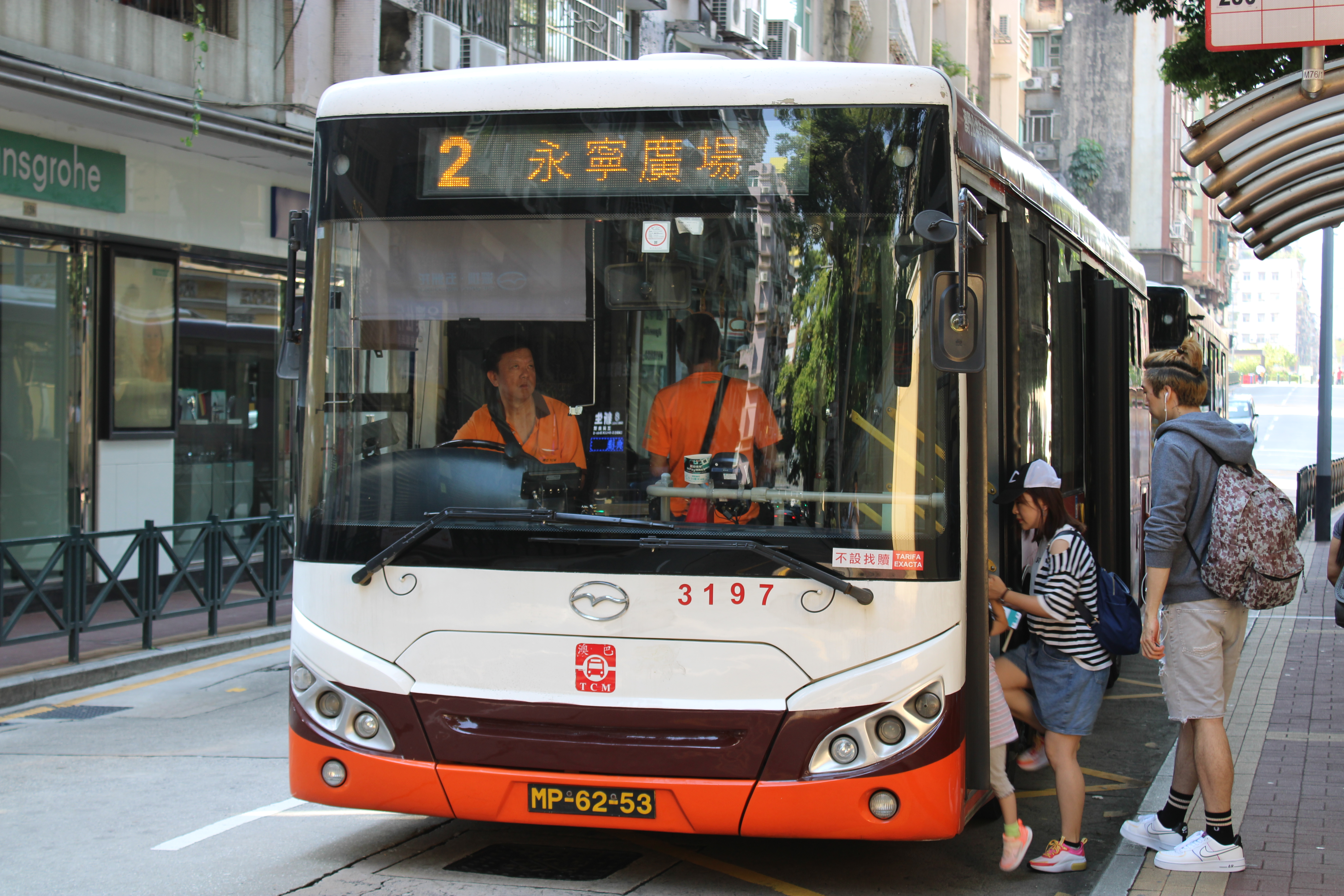

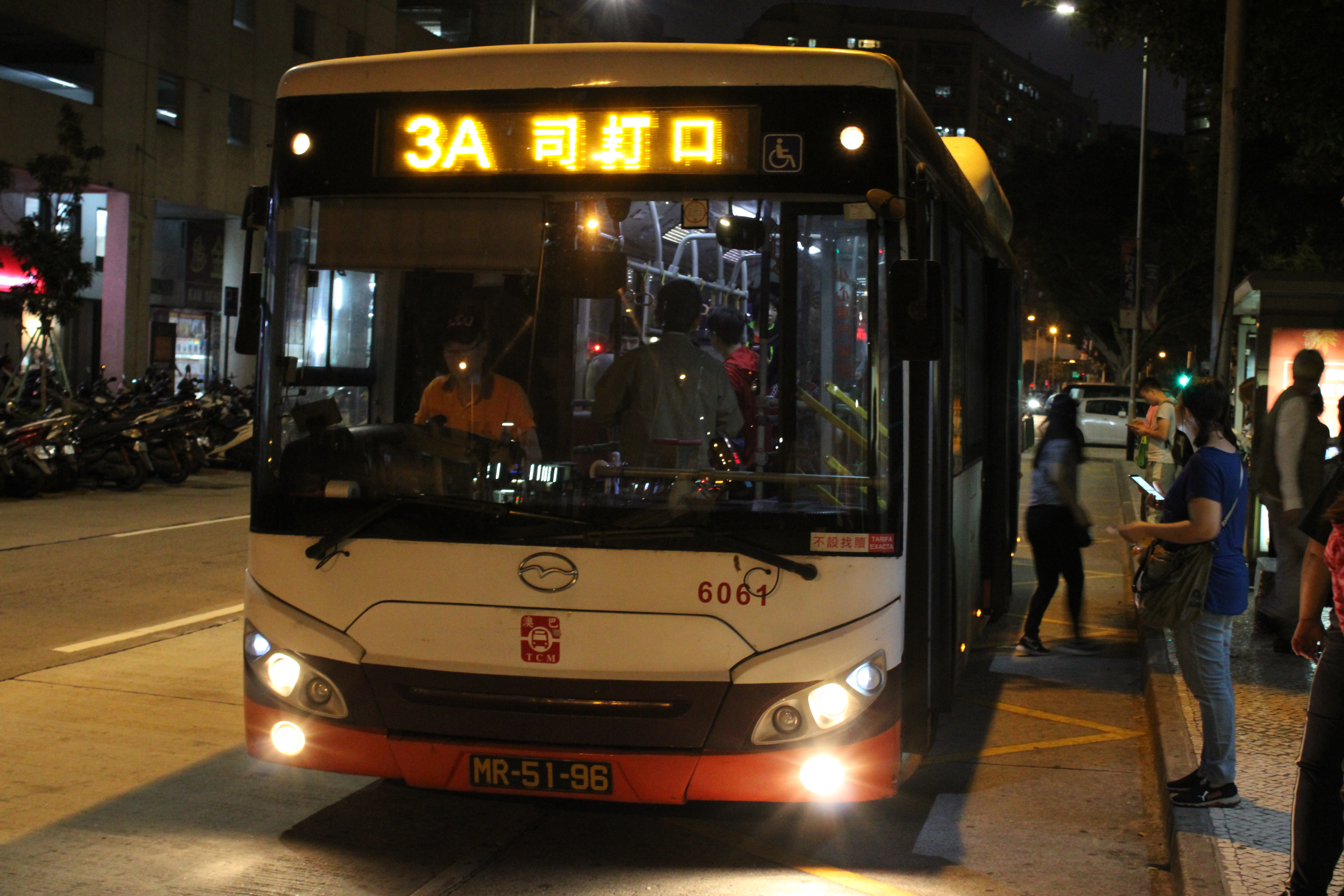

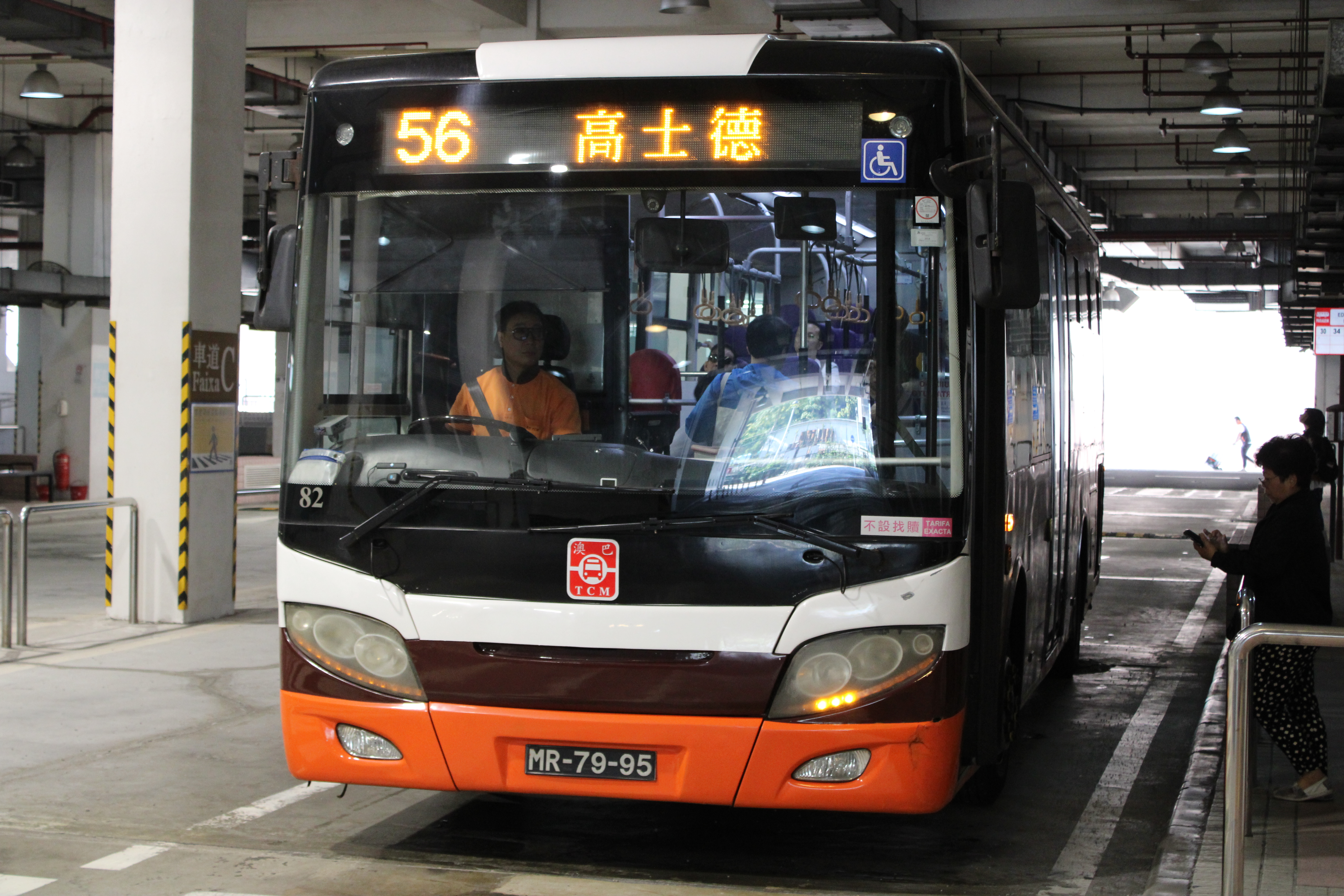

=== City Buses ===
- Wuzhoulong Coaster Mini Bus
- Wuzhoulong FDG5140 City bus
- Wuzhoulong FDG6101CNG City bus
- Wuzhoulong FDG6101G City bus
- Wuzhoulong FDG6101HEVG City bus
- Wuzhoulong FDG6111HEVG City bus (Hybrid)
- Wuzhoulong FDG6111NG City bus
- Wuzhoulong FDG6113EVG City bus (Electric)
- Wuzhoulong FDG6115HEVG City bus (Hybrid)
- Wuzhoulong FDG6121G City bus
- Wuzhoulong FDG6121GC3 City bus
- Wuzhoulong FDG6128A CNG City bus
- Wuzhoulong FDG6751EVG City bus (Electric)
- Wuzhoulong FDG6801EVG City bus (Electric)
- Wuzhoulong FDG6910GC3 City bus
- Wuzhoulong FDG6921NG City bus
- Wuzhoulong FDG6951G City bus
- Wuzhoulong WZL6100EVG City bus (Electric)
- Wuzhoulong WZL6100NG4 City bus
- Wuzhoulong WZL6100PHEVGEG3 City bus (Electric)
- Wuzhoulong WZL6123NG4 City bus
- Wuzhoulong WZL6123PHEVGEG4 City bus (Hybrid)
- Wuzhoulong WZL6731NGT4 City bus
- Wuzhoulong WZL6780NGT4 City bus
- Wuzhoulong WZL6848NGT4 City bus
- Wuzhoulong WZL6870NG4 City bus

=== Coaches ===
- Wuzhoulong FDG6110DC3 Coach
- Wuzhoulong FDG6110EC3 Coach
- Wuzhoulong FDG6116 Coach
- Wuzhoulong FDG6128 Coach
- Wuzhoulong FDG6128A CNG Coach
- Wuzhoulong FDG6701 Coach
- Wuzhoulong FDG6803 Coach
- Wuzhoulong FDG6810 Coach
- Wuzhoulong FDG6810C3-1 Coach
- Wuzhoulong FDG6860C3 Coach
- Wuzhoulong REAUFDG6128 Coach
- Wuzhoulong WZL6110A4 Coach
- Wuzhoulong WZL6110NA5 Coach
- Wuzhoulong WZL6600AT3 Coach
- Wuzhoulong WZL6661AT4 Coach
- Wuzhoulong WZL6720AT3 Coach
- Wuzhoulong WZL6820A4 Coach
- Wuzhoulong WZL6820NA4 Coach
- Wuzhoulong WZL6890A4 Coach
- Wuzhoulong WZL6781AT4 Coach
- Wuzhoulong WZL6781NAT4 Coach
- Wuzhoulong WZL6890NA4 Coach

=== School buses ===
- Wuzhoulong WZL6601AT4-X School bus
- Wuzhoulong WZL6661AT4-X School bus
- Wuzhoulong WZL6740AT4-X School bus
- Wuzhoulong WZL6800AT4-X School bus
- Wuzhoulong WZL6930AT4-X School bus
- Wuzhoulong WZL6661AT4-X School bus
- Wuzhoulong WZL6930AT4-X School bus
- Wuzhoulong WZL6990A4 School bus
- Wuzhoulong WZL6990AT4-X School bus

=== Other ===
- Wuzhoulong FDG5105XTJ1 Medical bus
- Wuzhoulong FDG5140XTJ1 RV
