= Museo El Deposito =

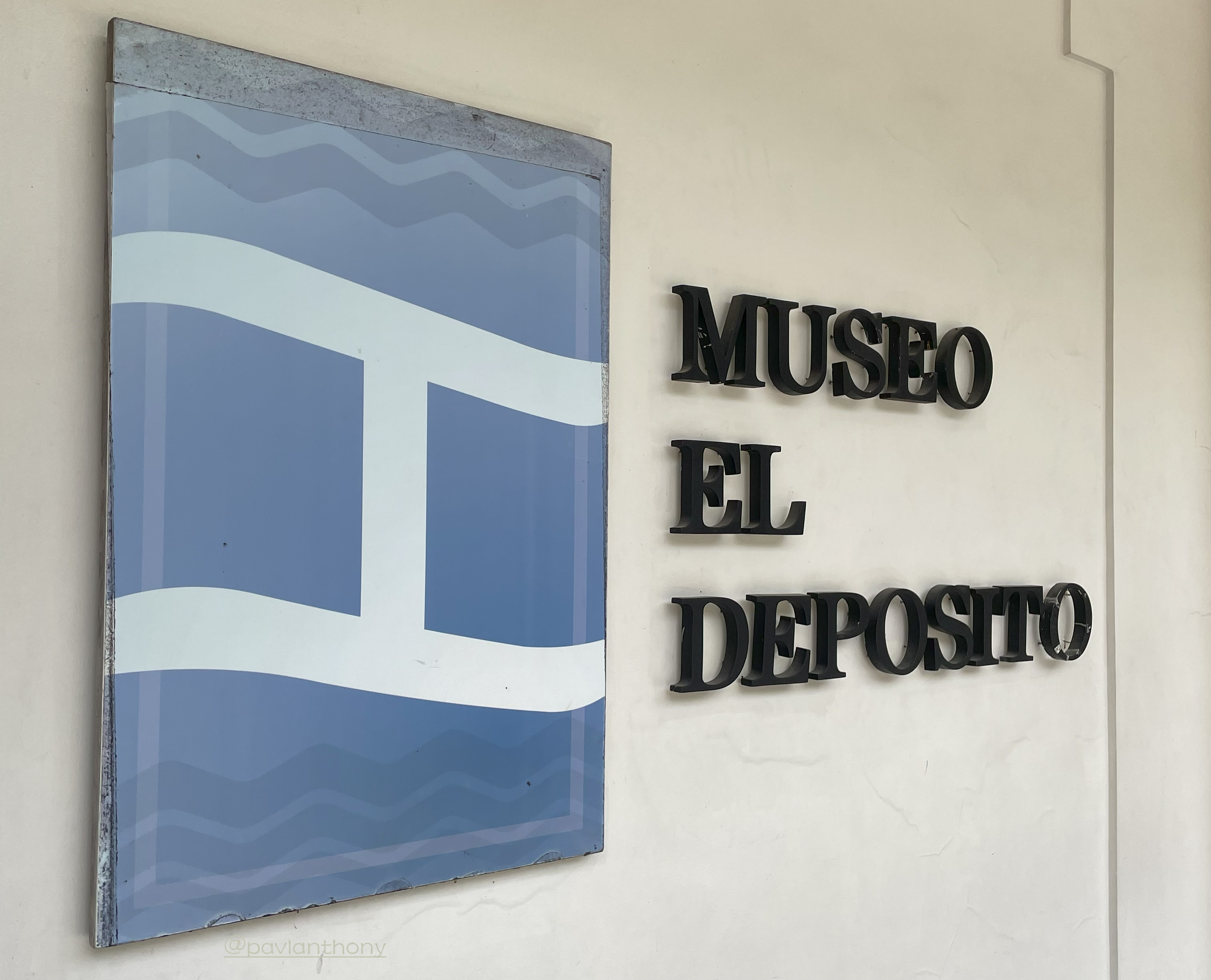
- Established: February 20, 2019
- Location: Pinaglabanan Shrine, San Juan, Metro Manila, Philippines
- Coordinates: 14°36′15″N 121°01′54″E
- Type: History museum
- Owner: National Historical Commission of the Philippines

Museo El Deposito (transl. El Deposito Museum) is a history museum in the city of San Juan in Metro Manila, Philippines, which features the Carriedo water system, including the El Deposito underwater reservoir.

The museum is situated within the grounds of the Pinaglabanan Shrine. It opened on February 20, 2019.

== Features ==
The Museo El Deposito is housed inside a two-storey building on top of the El Deposito underground reservoir and is beside the Museo ng Katipunan, another museum. It has three galleries namely: the Audio-Visual Room, Resource Center, and the Virtual Reality Room. The audiovisual room narrates the period prior to the establishment of the Carriedo Waterworks in 1882, the Resource Center features artifacts, photographs, prints and scale models, while the virtual reality room provides a re-enactment of the Battle of San Juan del Monte to the museum visitors. An entrance to an aqueduct of the El Deposito itself is also visible in one portion of the museum.

== Gallery ==
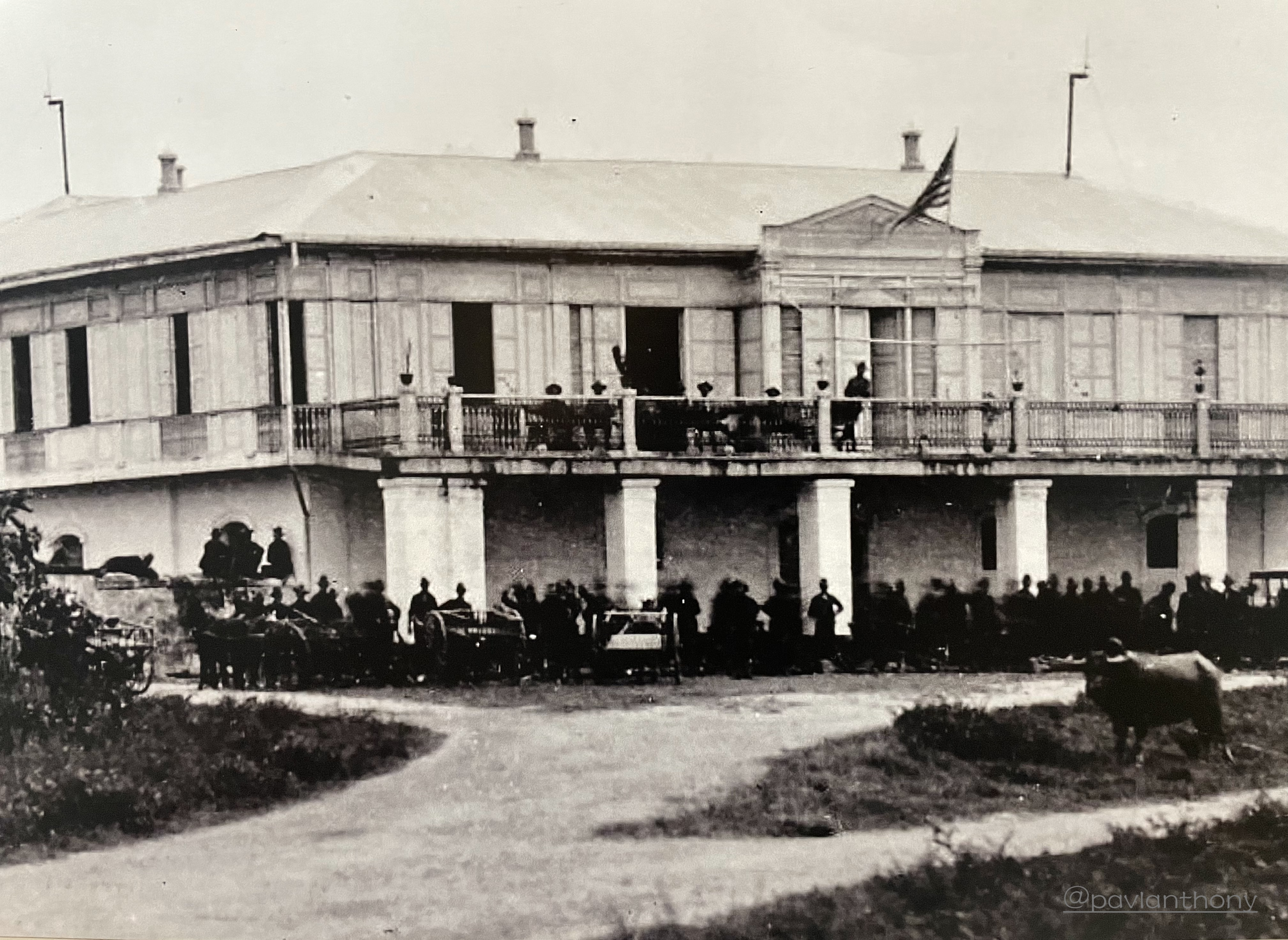
El Deposito late 19th Century-early 20th Century during the American Occupation

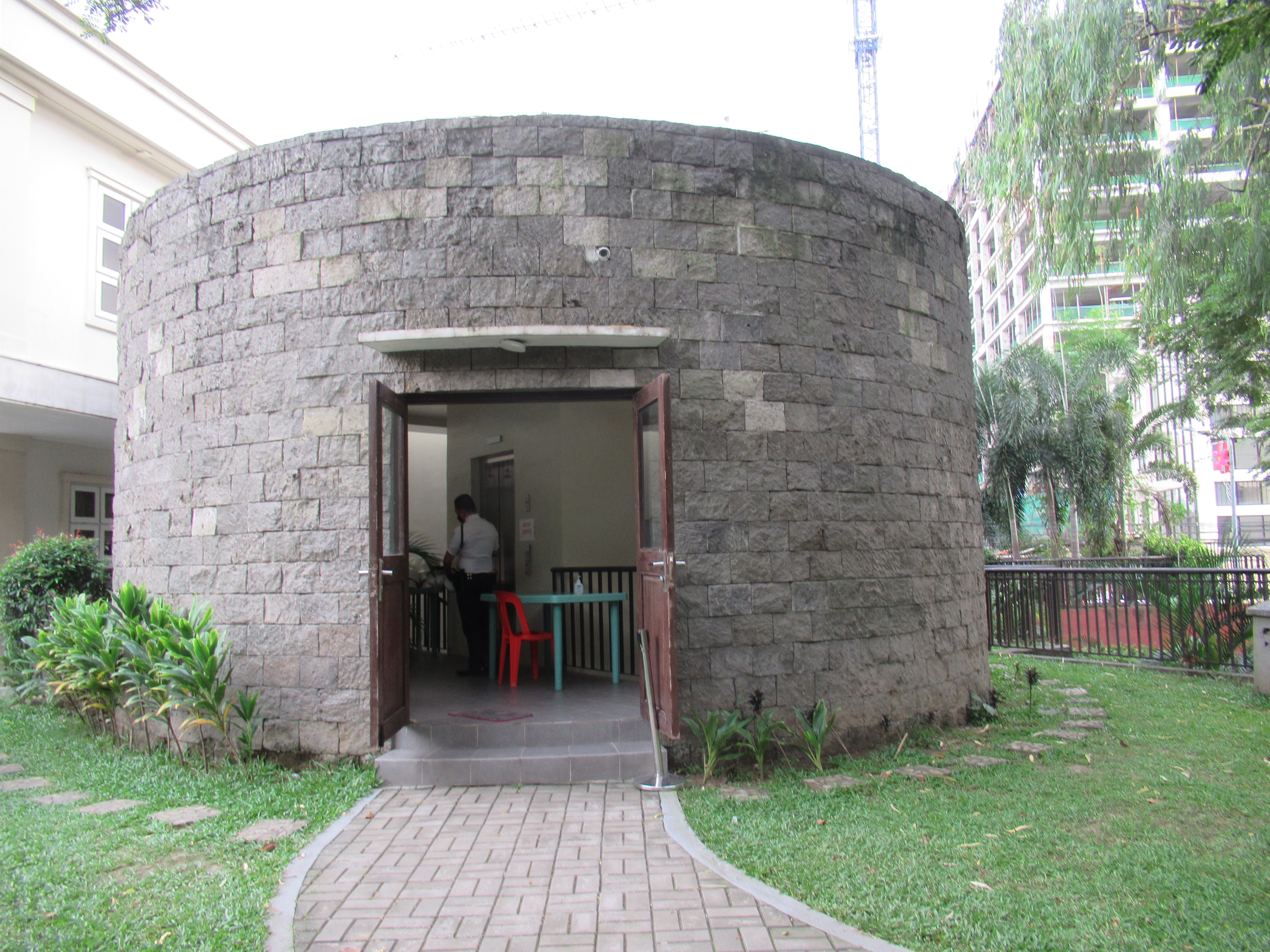
Underground Water Reservoir entrance

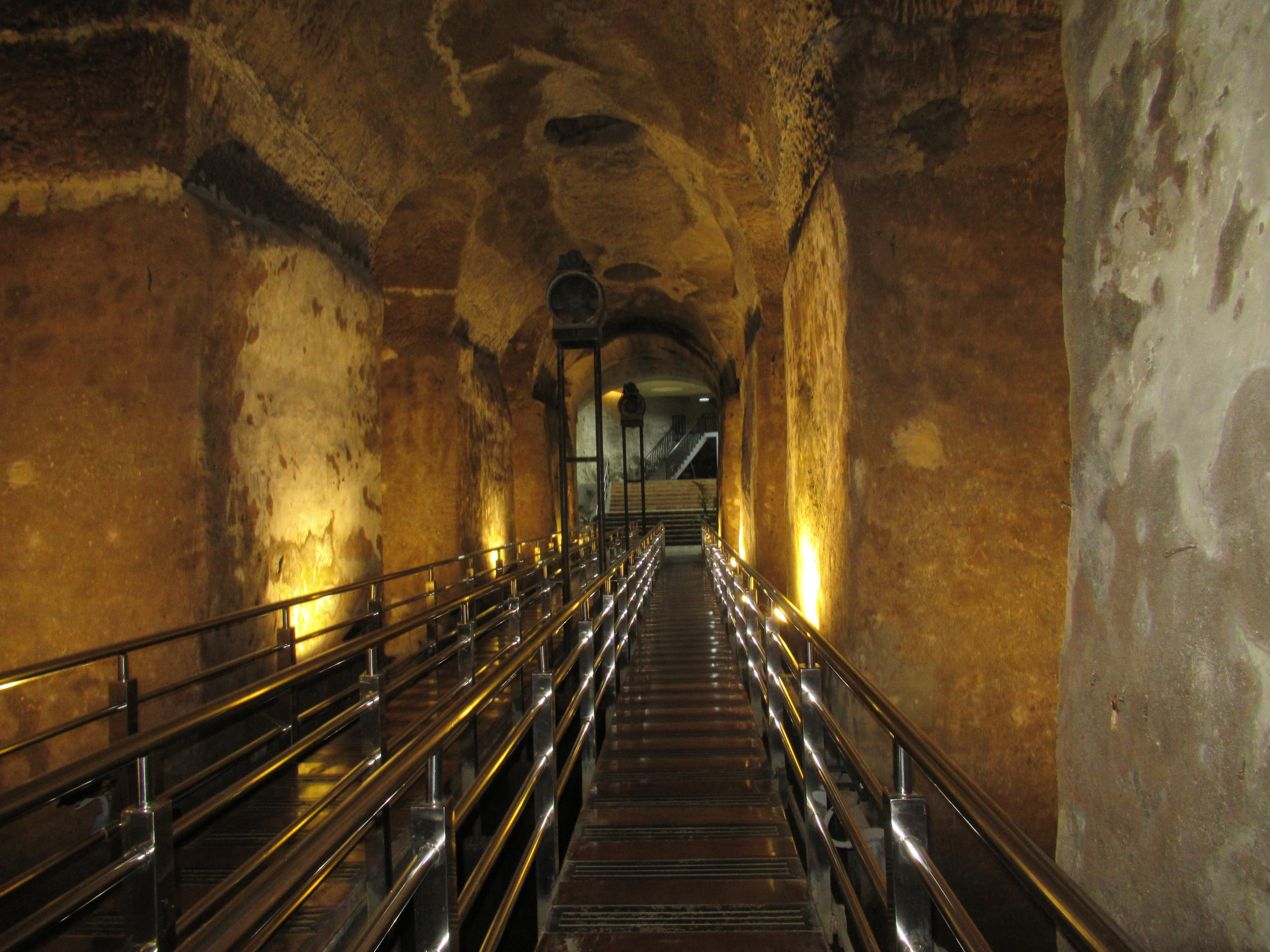
El Depósito Underground Water Reservoir

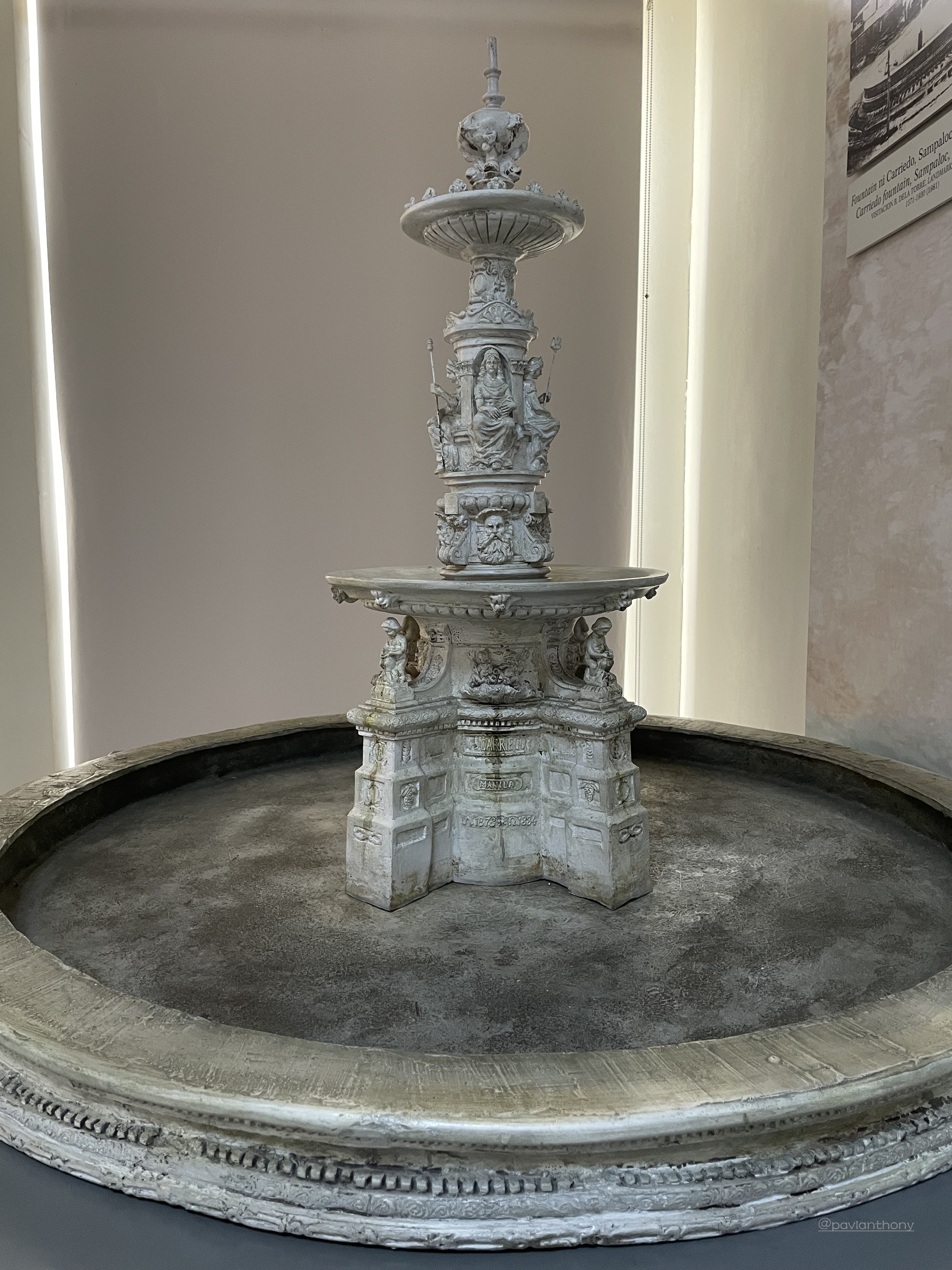
Carriedo Fountain Miniature Display in Museo El Deposito

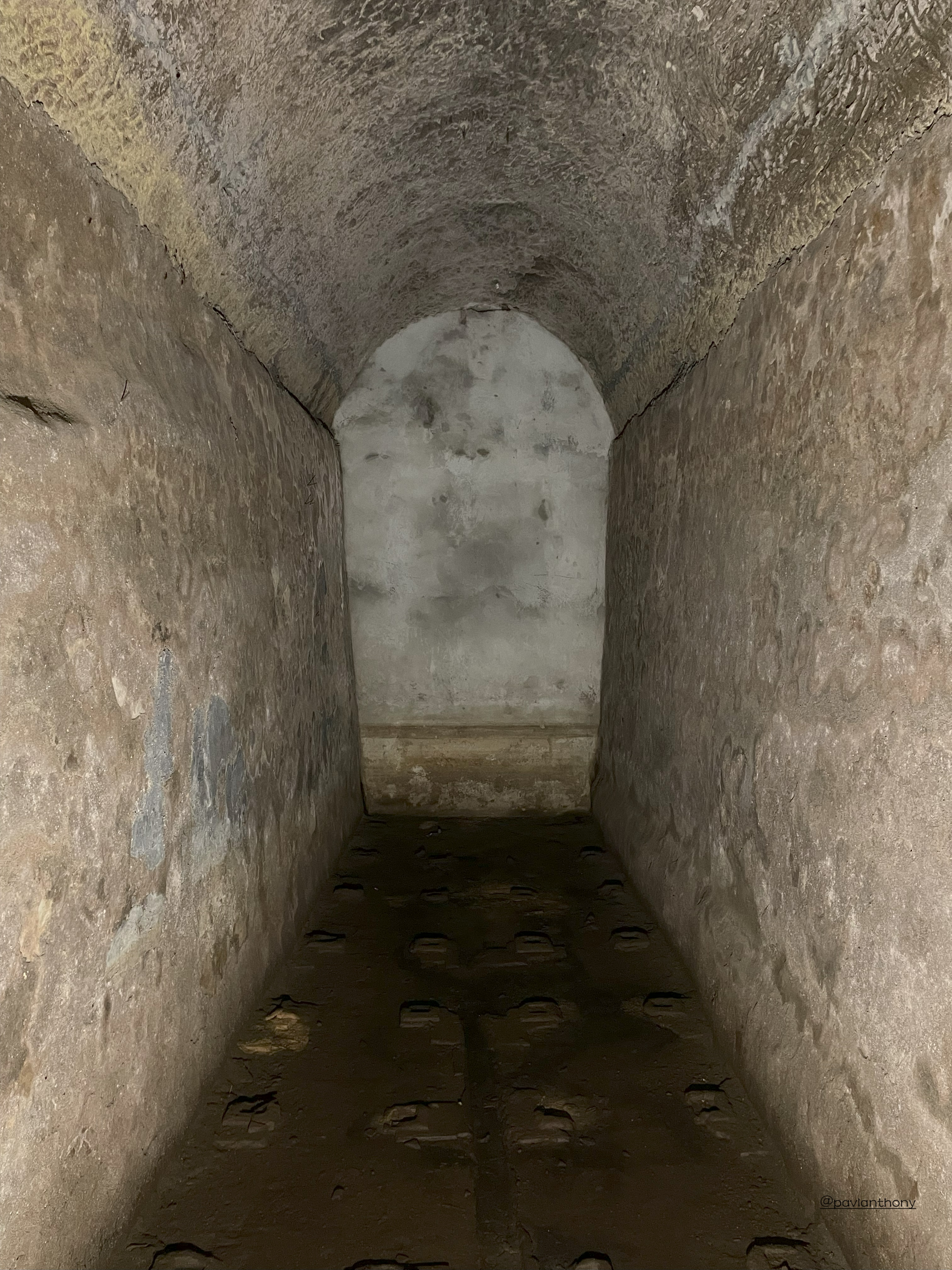
One of the many tunnels in El Depósito's Underground Water Reservoir
