= Balara Filters Park =

Park in Quezon City, Philippines

Coordinates: 14°39′17″N 121°4′54″E

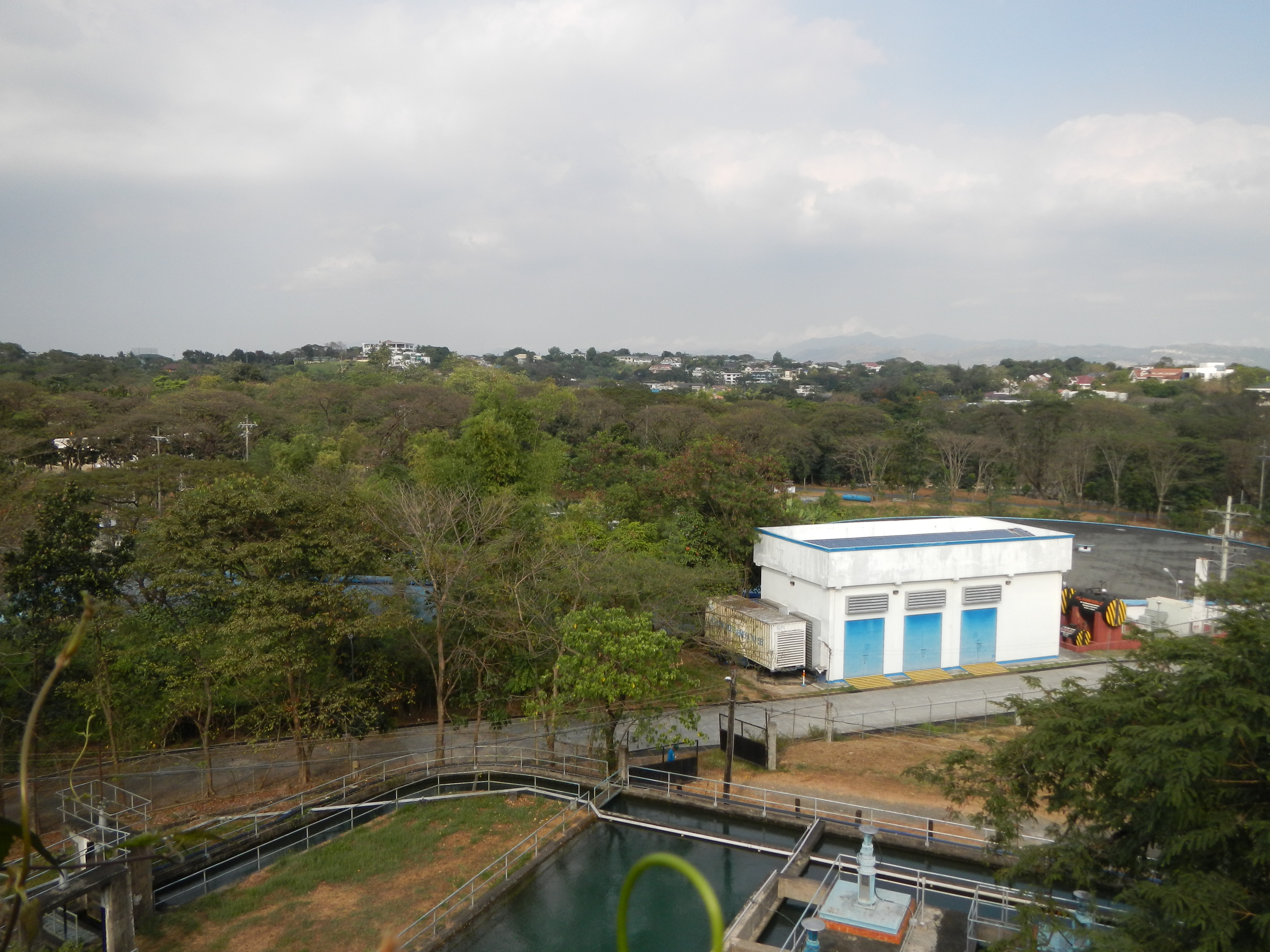
- An aerial view of the Balara Filters Park
- Interactive map of Balara Filters Park
- Type: Nature park
- Location: Quezon City, Philippines
- Area: 60 hectares (600,000 m^{2})
- Created: 1953 (Metropolitan Water District); 2003 (Manila Water)
- Operator: Manila Water; Quezon City Parks Development and Administration Department
- Status: Opened
- Public transit: 19 Magsaysay Avenue

The Balara Filters Park is a 60-hectare (150-acre) park located in the Diliman village of Pansol in Quezon City, Metro Manila, Philippines, adjacent to the University of the Philippines Diliman main campus. It is bounded by Katipunan Avenue on the west, Capitol Hills Golf and Country Club on the north, and the upscale, gated village of La Vista along its south and east.

The park is one of the oldest recreation areas in Quezon City having been first opened to the public in 1953. It occupies part of the old Balara Filtration Plant complex, one of the main treatment facilities for water coming from the La Mesa Dam. The park is administered by the Manila Water company in partnership with the Quezon City Parks Development and Administration Department.

== History ==
The park was named after its location in the Balara filters plant, which was then situated in the old barrio of Matandáng Balará. During Spanish colonial times, the area formed part of the friar estate known as Hacienda de Dilimán owned by the Society of Jesus located between the pueblos of Caloocan and Mariquina. After the Spanish–American War, the Dilimán estate was acquired by the wealthy Tuason family, including the adjacent Hacienda de Santa Mesa and Hacienda de Mariquina. Ownership of the estate was ceded to the Philippine Commonwealth government in the late 1930s, after the area was selected as a new national capital to replace Manila.

The first Balara Filtration Plant was constructed in 1938 by the Metropolitan Water District as part of Manila's water system which included the Ipo Dam, the Novaliches Reservoir, and the San Juan Reservoir.

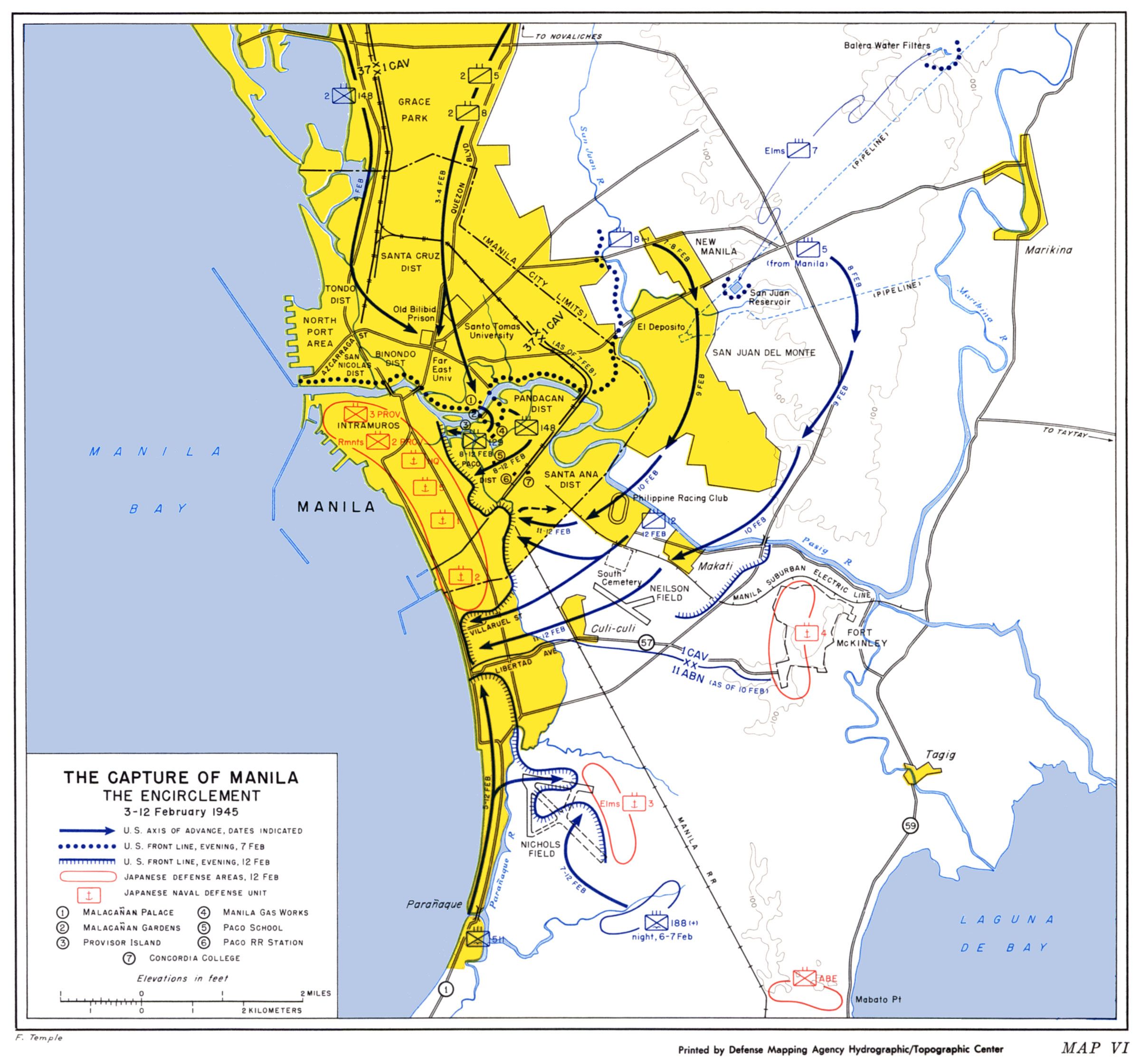
Balara Filters located on the northereaster corner of the operation during the Battle of Manila, and the stepping stone before the XIV Corps took on the Shimbu Group in the Sierra Madre mountain range east of Manila.

During World War II, the Balara Filters was the location of a skirmish between the Kobayashi Force under the Shimbu Group of Gen. Shizuo Yokoyama. On February 4, 1945, Gen. Kobayashi captured the facility before American forces arrived and planned to sabotage the water filtration plant. However the troops of the 1st Cavalry Division, along with air support from the Marine Aircraft Group 24 and 32 of the Marine Air Wing 1, were able to neutralize the Japanese troops on February 7. A Japanese counterattack was attempted once more on the Balara Station on February 11, but the saboteurs were neutralized after they were able to destroy one of the valves.

Amenities such as the rest house and swimming pools were then added between 1949 and 1959 to serve the water district's employees. These facilities were opened to the public in 1953 and instantly became a popular weekend destination for Manileños until the 1970s. The Metropolitan Water District was renamed the National Waterworks and Sewerage System (NAWASA) in 1955, and by 1971 was replaced by the Metropolitan Waterworks and Sewerage System (MWSS).

The complex was closed off to the public during much of the Ferdinand Marcos dictatorship. In 1997, after the MWSS was privatised, the site was turned over to Manila Water which began restoration works on plant facilities. The park was reopened in 2003 under then-Quezon City mayor Feliciano Belmonte.

== Features ==
The park is a collection of Art Deco buildings and natural landscapes centered around the Balara water reservoir and two filtration plants. It has a variety of features including:

- 3 huge swimming pools
- a 3,000-square-meter (32,000 sq ft) elevated picnic grove
- a 200-meter (660 ft) circumference oval
- a replica of the Carriedo Fountain in Santa Cruz, Manila designed by national artist Napoleon Abueva.
- Anonas Amphitheater, where National Artist Atang de la Rama once performed. The amphitheater was named after the first Filipino director, Gregorio Anonas, who served from 1934 to 1938.
- Children's Park
- Pedro Tobias Park
- Balara Filtration Windmill, with the sculpture “La Intrepida” by Fermin Yadao Gomez (1918–1984), by . Dedicated to Mother Philippines as she rides a chariot pulled by two carabao (water buffalo).
- Art Deco buildings from the Philippine Commonwealth era
  - Escoda Hall, a white and red pavilion dominating the pool complex with Southeast Asian motif roof designed by Francisco Mañosa.
  - Orosa Hall, a social hall with glazed stone floor surrounded by ornately designed white iron bars and covered by the original asbestos tile green roof.
  - Italian-style chapel
- the MWSS Administration Building, built in the 1980-1981 and designed by architect Gabriel Formoso.
- "Bernadine and her cherubs" by Fermin Gomez, which a white statue of a nude water-bearer surrounded by sculptures of children at play, serving as a fountain rotunda.
- a baby terrace named after First Daughter Zenaida Quezon.
- Widow's Walk bathhouses
- Lion Head
- Workers' Monument also by Fermin Gomez, in memory of the NAWASA employees who died during the construction of the filters.
- The Victoria Pools

== Gallery ==
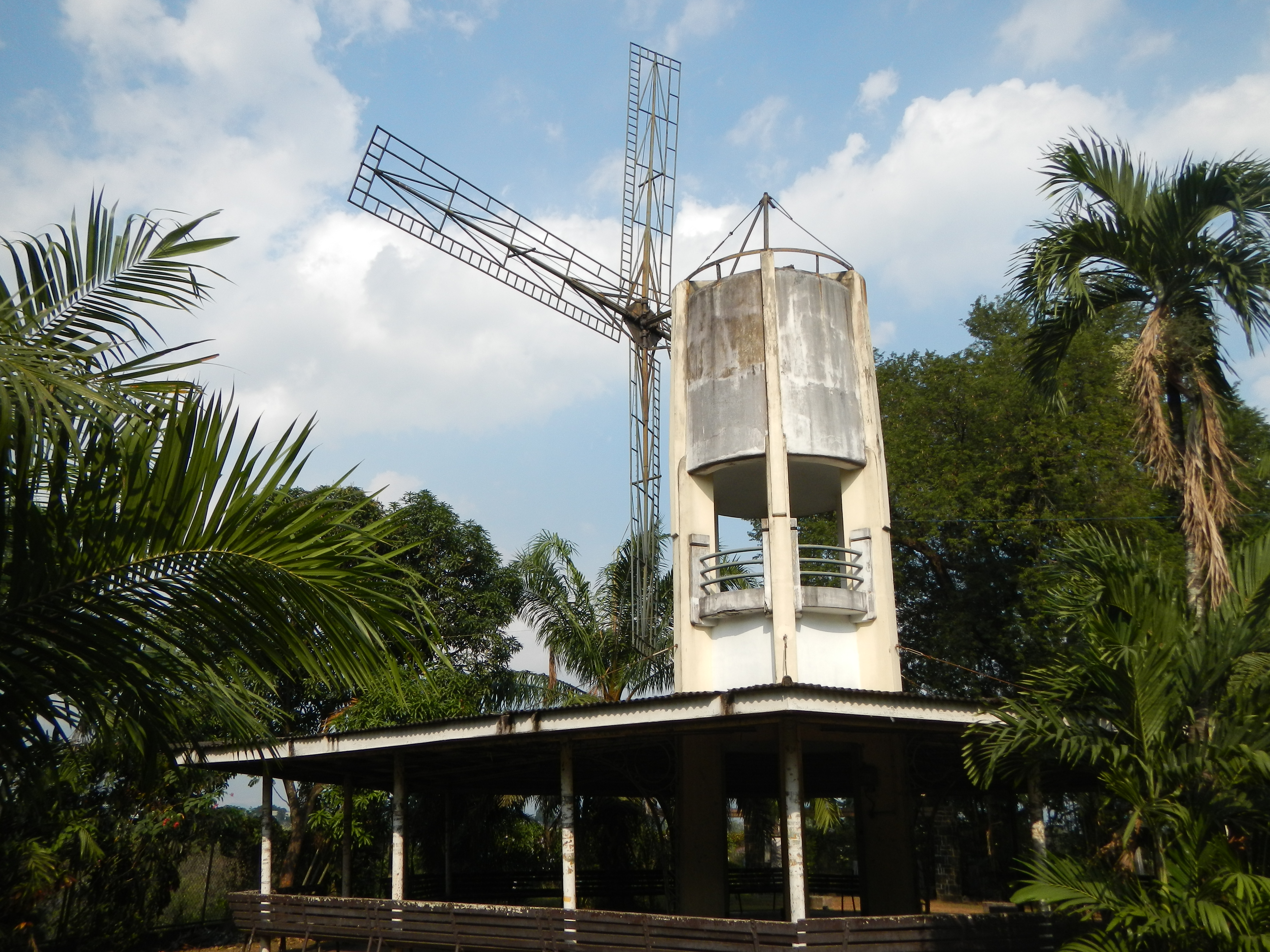
Balara Filtration Windmill

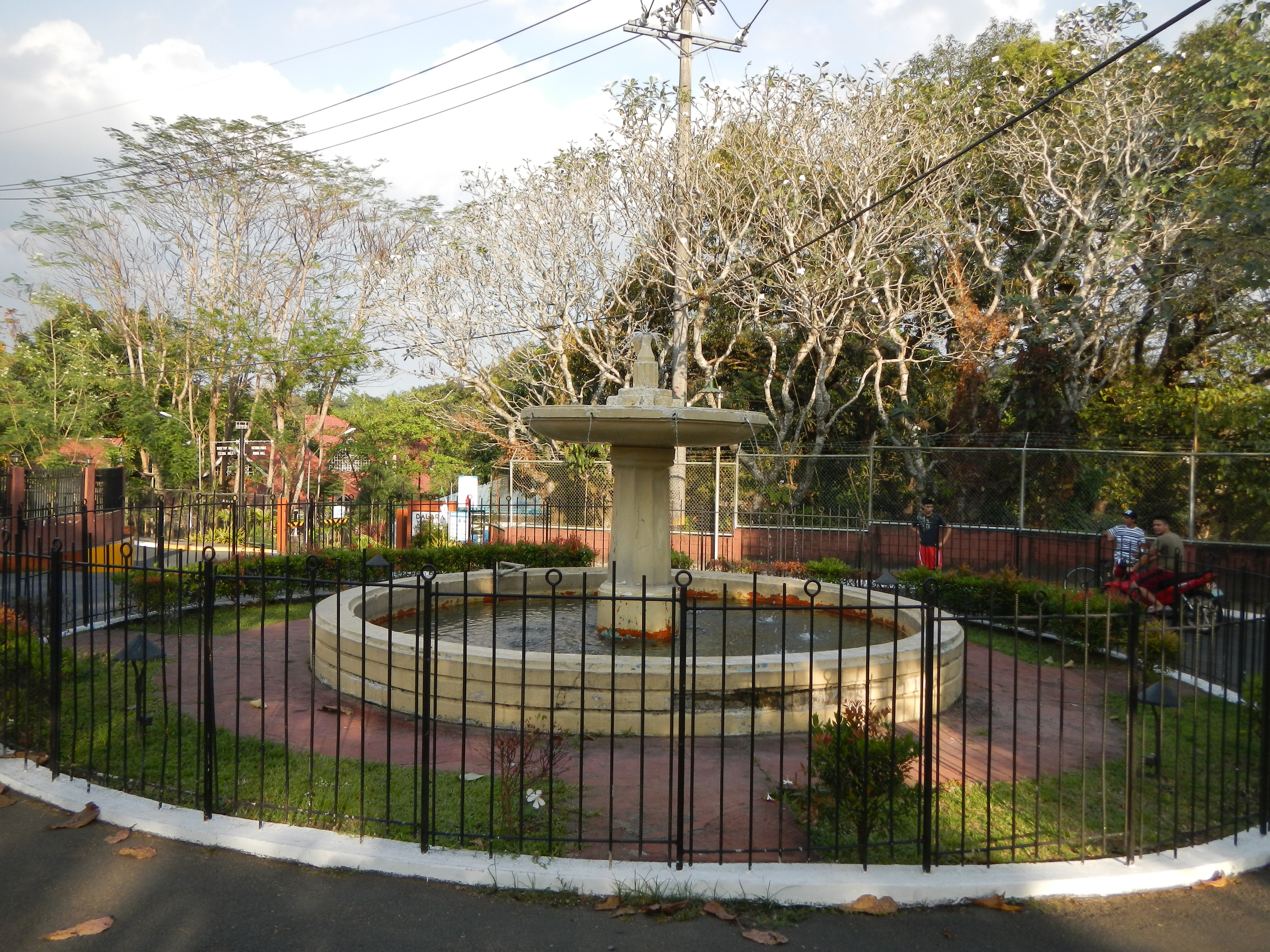
Replica of the Carriedo Fountain

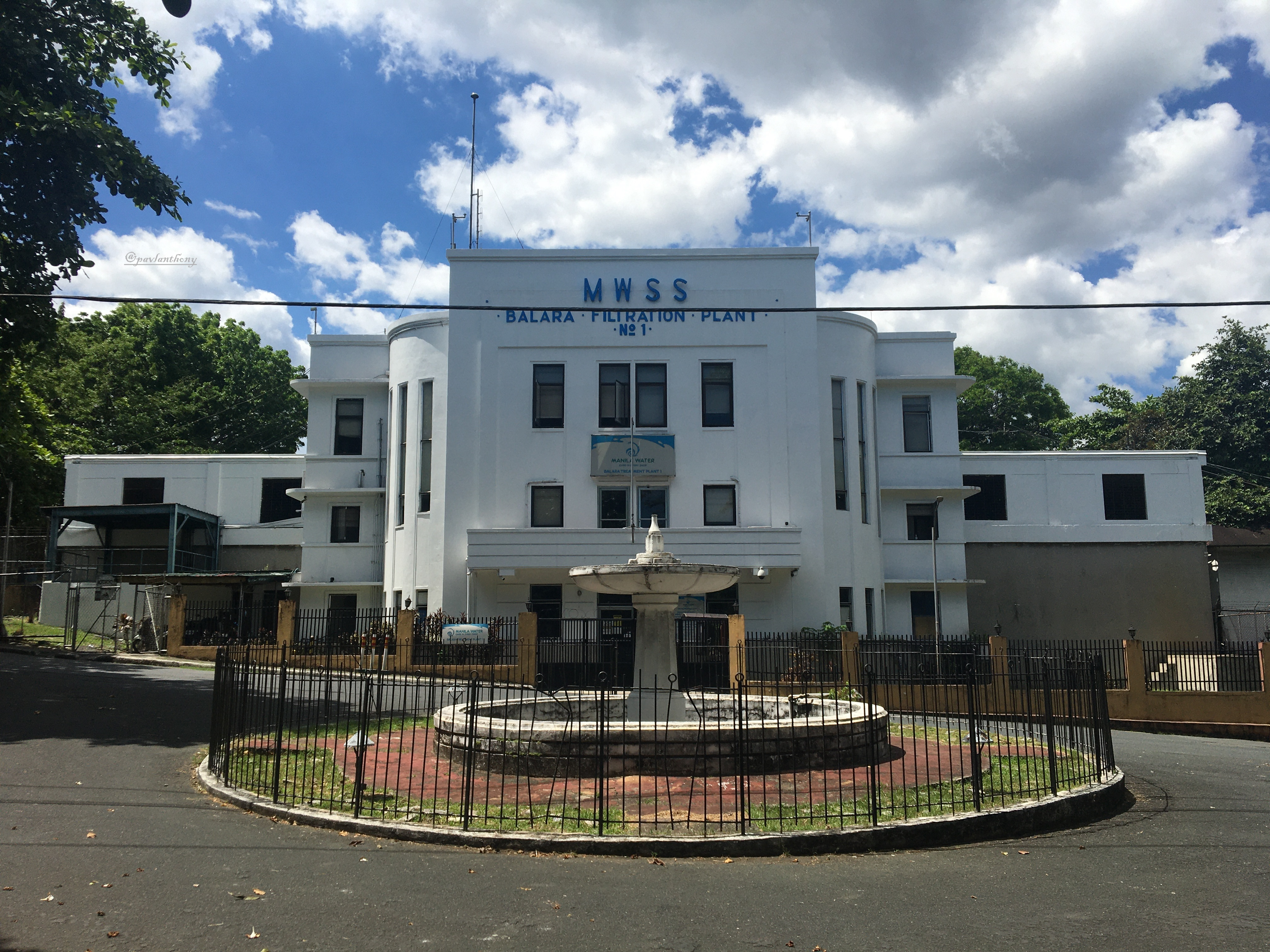
MWSS Balara Filtration Plant 1 in April 2025

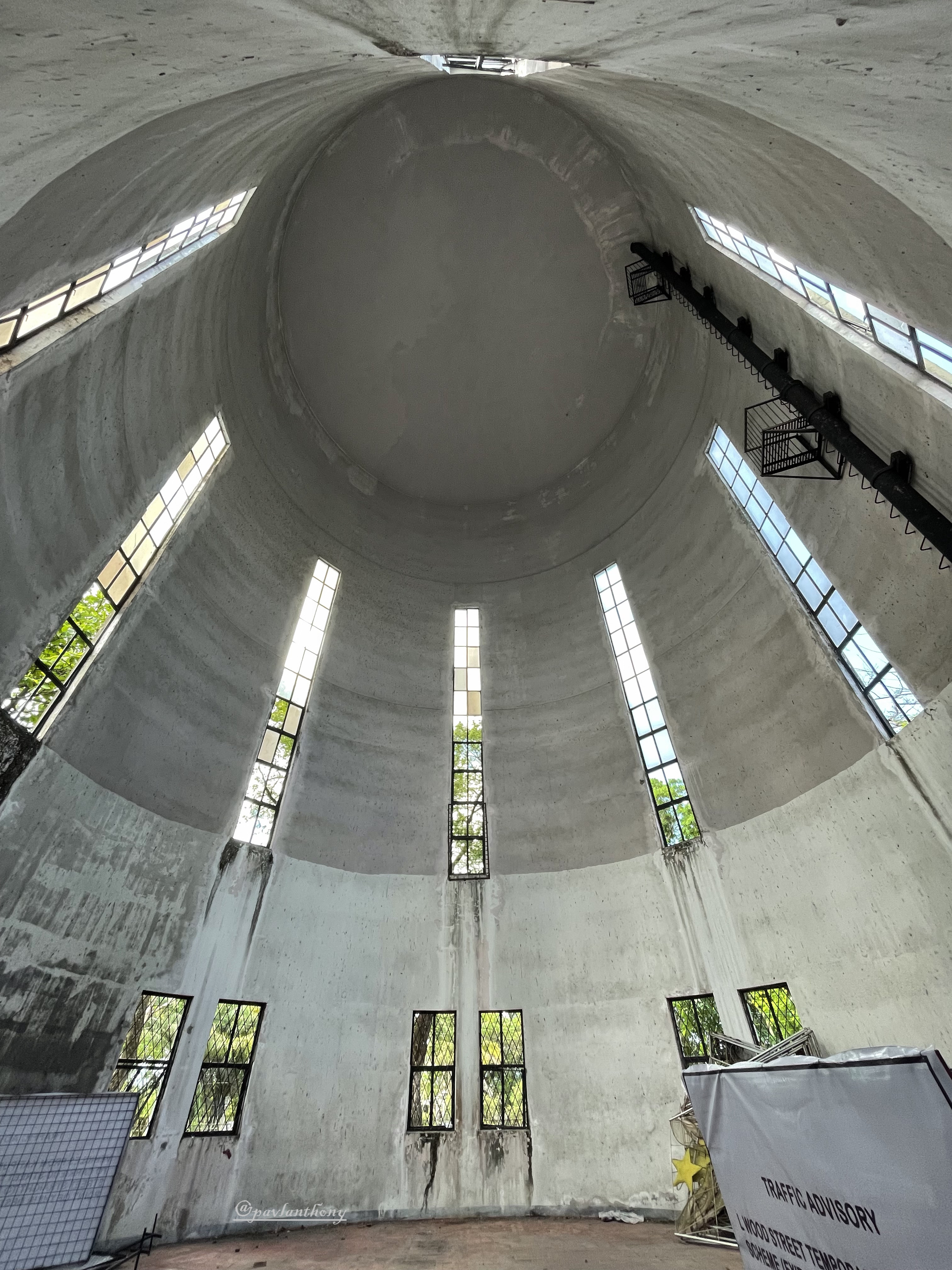
Inside of Balara Water Tower in April 2025
