= Carriedo Fountain =

Fountain in Manila, Philippines

Coordinates: 14.59988°N 120.98035°E

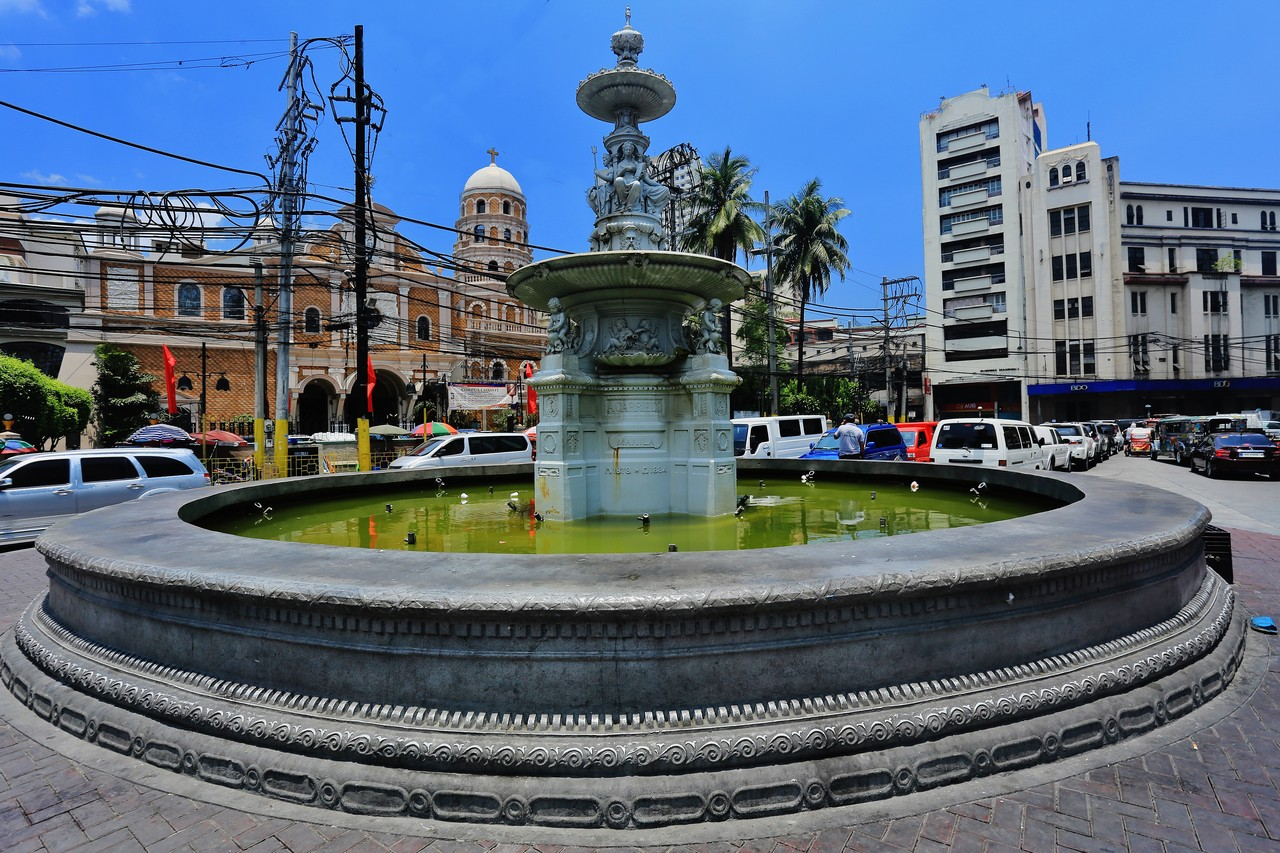
Carriedo Fountain at Plaza Santa Cruz

Carriedo Fountain (Spanish: Fuente Carriedo) is a fountain in Santa Cruz, Manila, Philippines. It was built in honour of the 18th-century Capitán General of Manila, Don Francisco Peredo Carriedo, benefactor of Manila's pipe water system. It was moved three times before its current location at Plaza Santa Cruz in front of the Santa Cruz Church.

== History ==
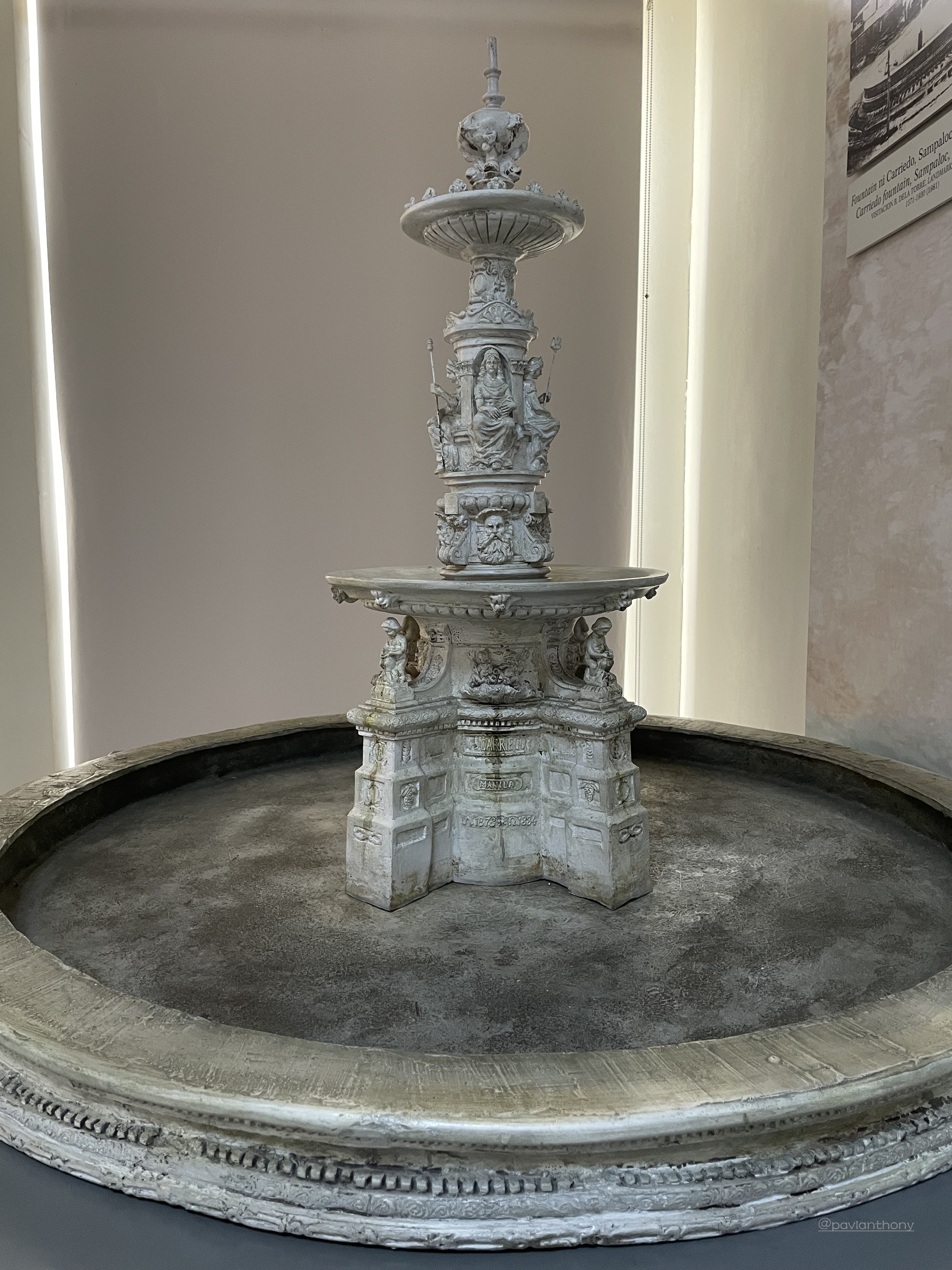
Carriedo Fountain Miniature Display in Museo El Deposito

Since pre-colonial times, Manila residents used the Pasig River as their main water source. The water was filtered through cloth in a tapayan (earthenware cooling jar) and then cleansed with alum. According to José Rizal, the rivers and esteros in Binondo were used as baths, sewers, laundry, fishery, transport, and drinking water. This can be one of the reasons for water-borne epidemics during those periods.

Francisco Peredo Carriedo, a native of Santander, Spain and general of the Santa Familia galleon, raised funds to construct the water system of Manila. He donated ten thousand pesos drawn from his fortune from the Acapulco-Manila investments. He did not live to see his resolve of creating a water system in Manila take fruit.

The system was constructed a century afterwards through the exhaustive research of the Spanish Franciscan friar Felix Huerta, who was serving as administrator of the San Lazaro Hospital in Manila, using his long-forgotten funds which Huerta tracked down after going through over 300 documents, and pooled capital from some entities purported to include Trinidad Roxas de Ayala. Under his urging, the Carriedo Fountain was built in May 1882 as part of the Carriedo water works system and was inaugurated by Governor-General Fernando Primo de Rivera on July 24, 1882. It was named after the man who had conceived and eventually funded the system, Francisco Peredo Carriedo.

The fountain was first located at the Rotonda de Sampaloc, the intersection between Legarda, Lacson and Magsaysay streets, which today forms the Nagtahan Interchange that separates Sampaloc from Santa Mesa since Francisco Peredo Carriedo resided in Santa Mesa, Manila. The roundabout was cleared in 1976 due to traffic concerns and the fountain was then transferred to the Balara Filters Park, in front of the Metropolitan Waterworks and Sewerage System (MWSS) building right after they moved from their office in Arroceros (today Antonio J. Villegas St., Ermita, Manila) in the latter part of the 1970s.

== Replica ==
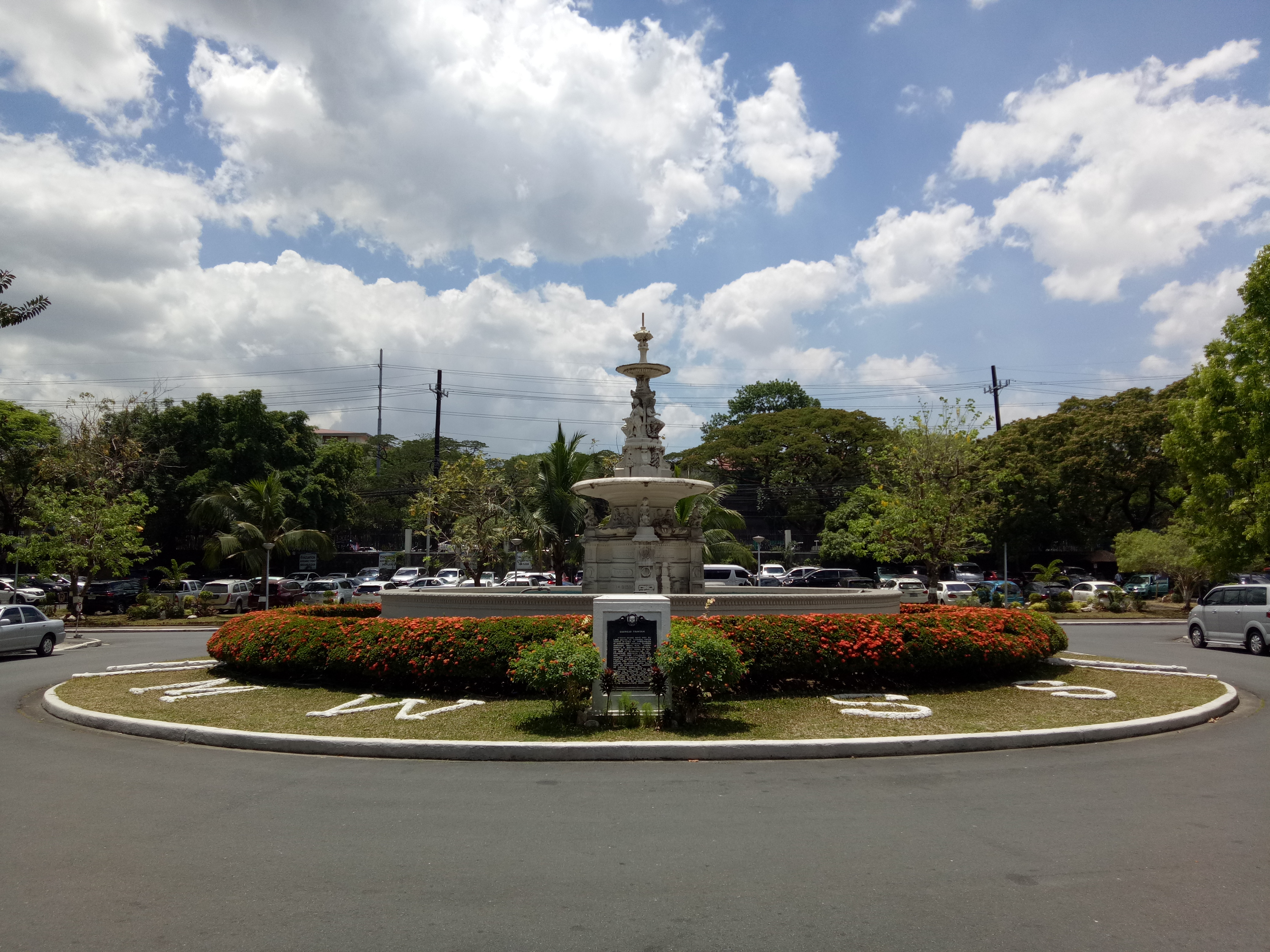
Carriedo Fountain replica in Balara Filters Park, Quezon City

In the 1990s, during the first term of Manila Mayor Alfredo Lim, he convinced MWSS administrator Mr. Luis E. V. Sison to bring back the Carriedo Fountain to Manila. MWSS agreed but requested that the fountain be replicated. The company commissioned National Artist Napoleon Abueva to replicate the original Carriedo Fountain in the spot where it was relocated. Abueva worked for one year using plaster as the primary material to create a rendition that would not be suspected as a replica.

== Gallery ==
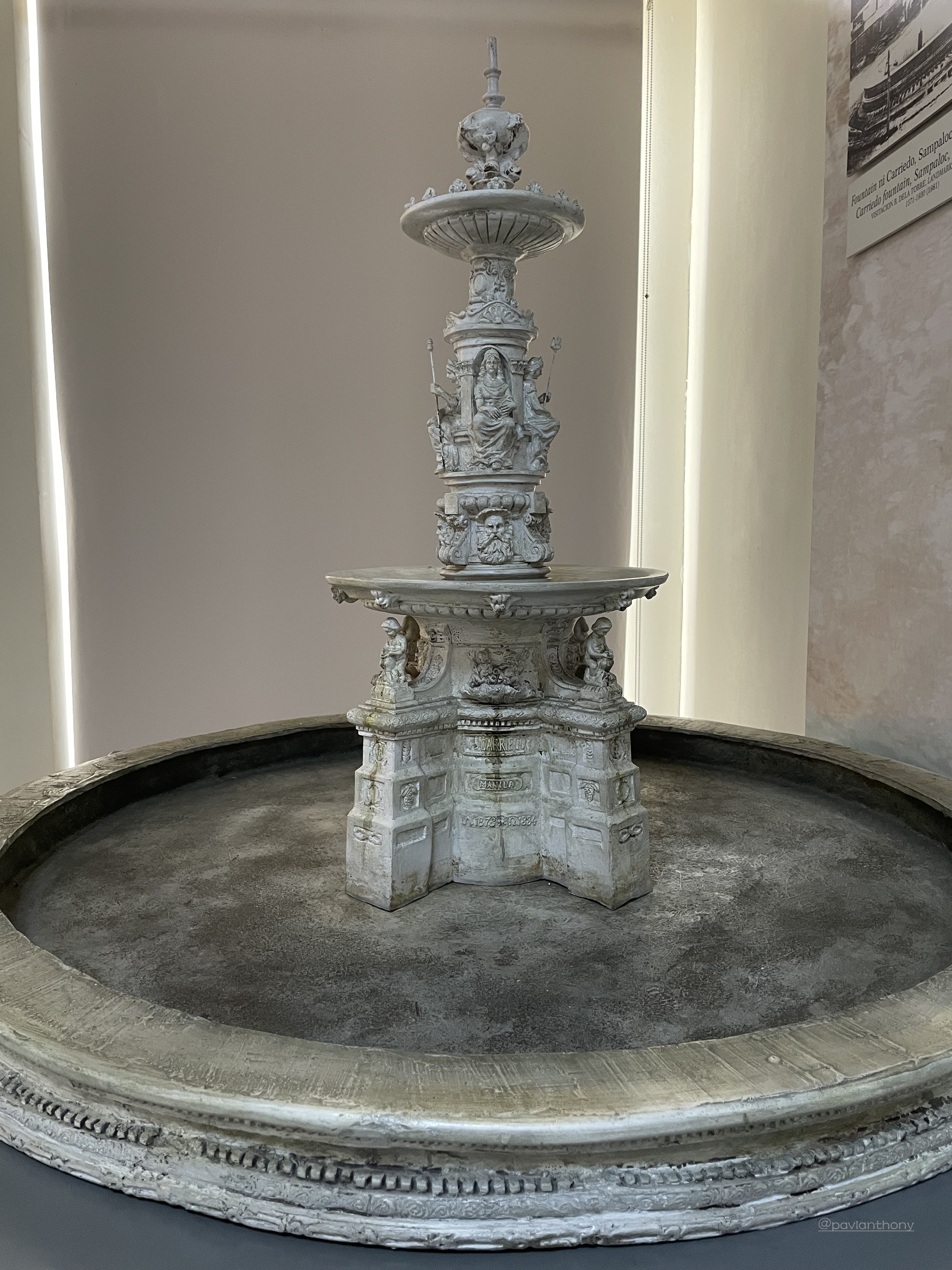
Carriedo Fountain Miniature Display in Museo El Deposito

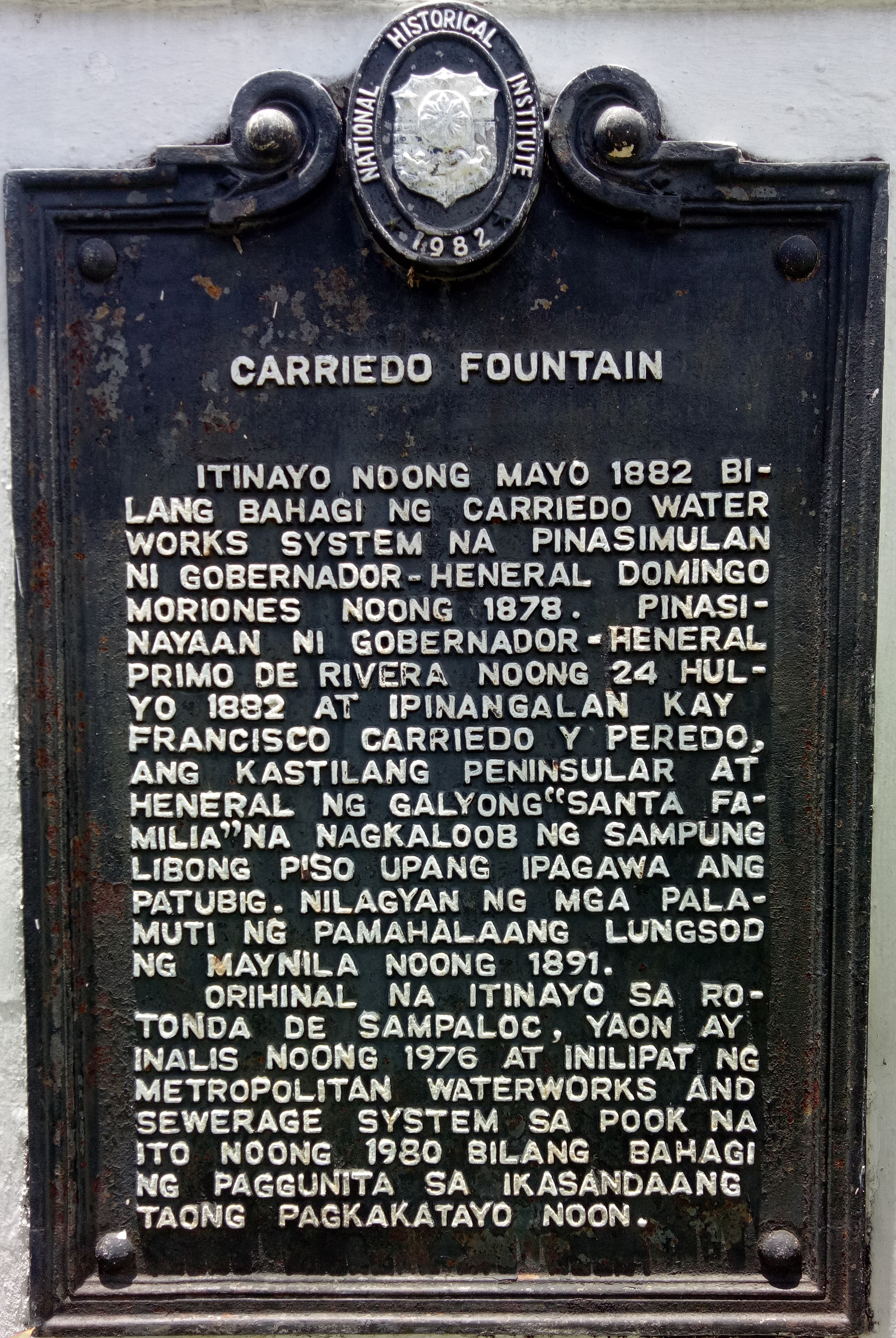
Carriedo Fountain Historical marker in Filipino language

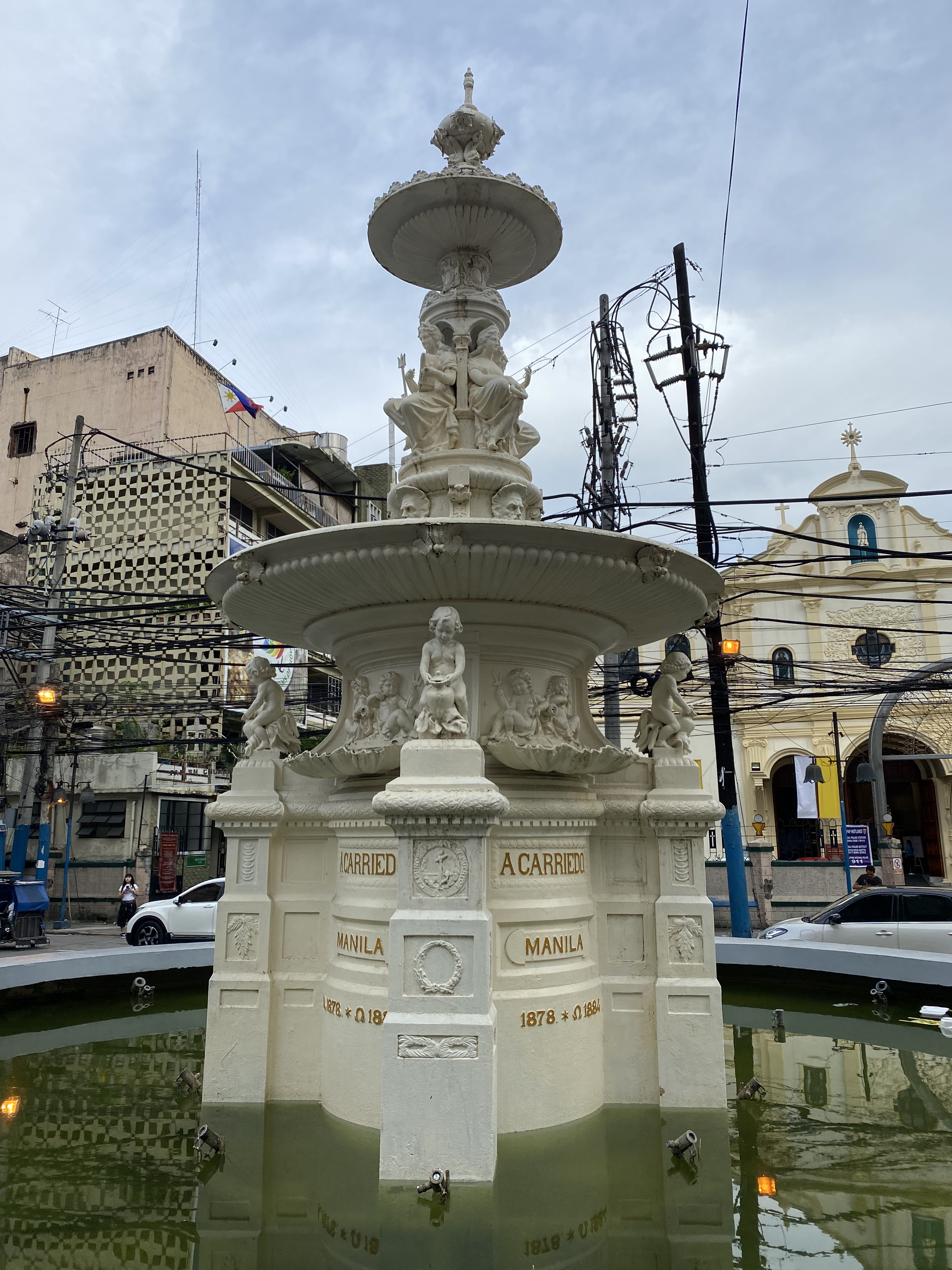
The fountain in 2025
