= Museo ng Katipunan =

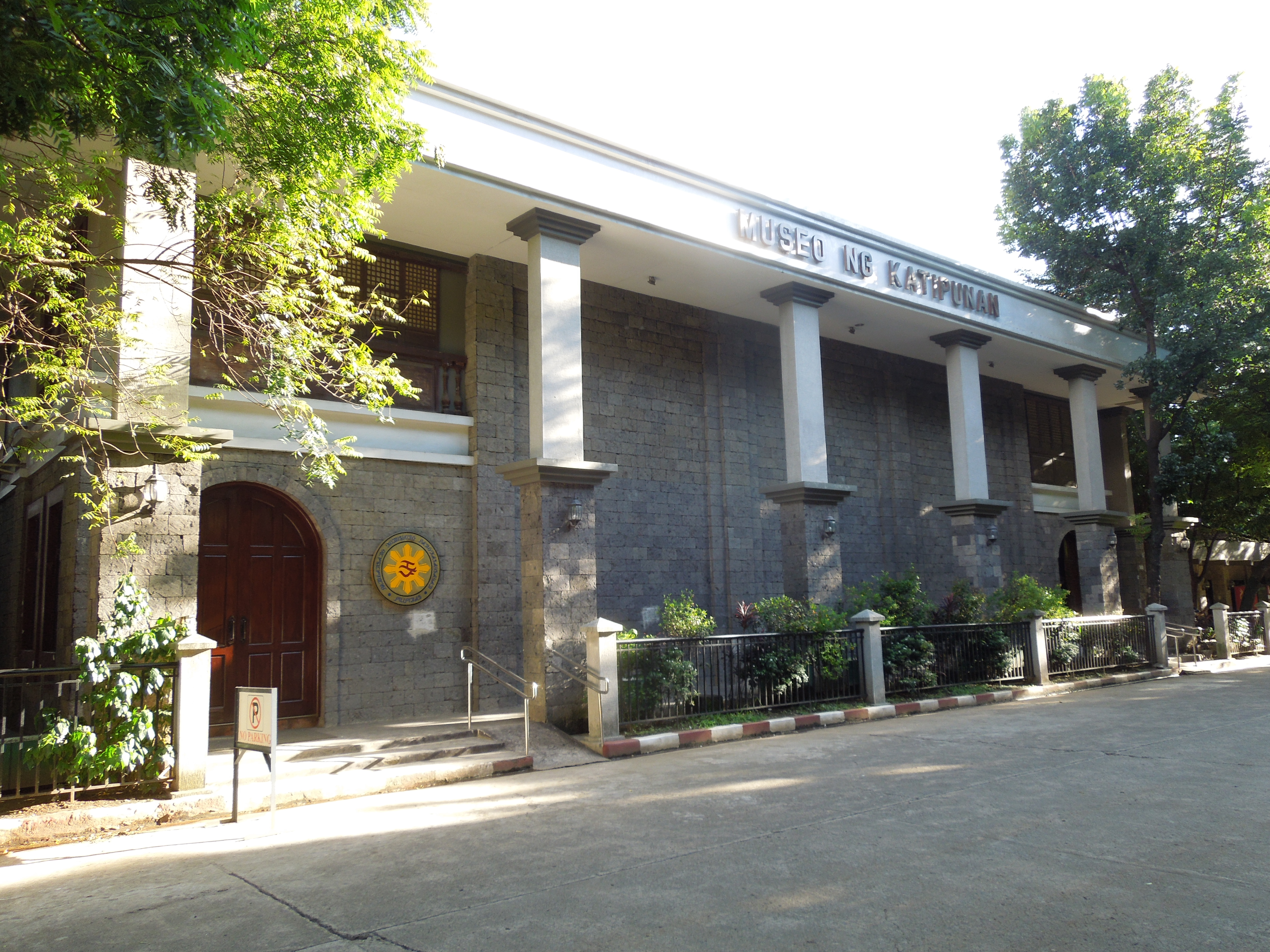
- Former name: Museo ng Rebolusyon
- Established: August 30, 1996
- Location: Pinaglabanan Shrine, San Juan, Metro Manila, Philippines
- Coordinates: 14°36′15″N 121°01′53″E
- Type: History museum
- Owner: National Historical Commission of the Philippines

Museo ng Katipunan (transl. Museum of the Katipunan) is a history museum in the city of San Juan in Metro Manila, Philippines dedicated to the Katipunan. It is situated within the grounds of the Pinaglabanan Shrine.

== History ==
The Museo ng Katipunan was opened as the Museo ng Rebolusyon (transl. Museum of the Revolution) on August 30, 1996, during the centennial of the Battle of Pinaglabanan. Prior to 2006, the museum mainly featured the Battle of Pinaglabanan and had pictures, cutouts, and busts of Andres Bonifacio, Emilio Jacinto, and Apolinario Mabini as exhibits. The museum underwent a ₱5 million renovation and was expanded to cover the Katipunan organization as a whole and was re-inaugurated as the Museo ng Katipunan on Bonifacio Day in 2006. It was reconstructed as a modernized museum and was reopened on August 27, 2013.

== Collection ==
The Museo ng Katipunan features artifacts which relate to the Philippine Revolution and the Katipunan. The museum includes documents such as cedulas, oaths, membership forms, as well as medals, anting-anting and weapons used by the Katipunan.
