= Felix Huerta =

Félix de Huerta, O.F.M., was a Spanish Franciscan friar, Catholic priest, scholar and missionary to the Philippines during the 19th century, when it was still a colony of Spain. He is best known for authoring a history of local Catholic parishes which is now a critical tool for Philippine historians. He was also the founder of Manila's Monte de Piedad Savings and Mortgage Bank, and was instrumental in the establishment of Manila's first water system.

== As historical chronicler ==
Huerta is best known today as the author of Estado geográfico, topográfico, estadístico, histórico-religioso de la santa y apostólica provincia de San Gregorio Magno ("Geographical, topographical, statistical, historical and religious state of the holy and apostolic province of St. Gregory the Great"), a record of the histories of Franciscan missions which is now a primary resource for local histories of Philippine municipalities.

== As founder of the Monte de Piedad Bank ==
Another of Huerta's achievements was establishing what later became the Manila's Monte de Piedad Savings and Mortgage Bank, with the intent of providing a savings bank for Manila's poor which would charge moderate interest rates. This had been ordered by the Spanish government around 1860, but the order had not been carried out. With the backing of the Archbishop of Manila and the Spanish colonial government, Huerta opened the bank on August 2, 1882. Committed to the service of the poor, any monies over the amount of the initial debt received in auctioning unredeemed items would be given to the debtor or his heirs.

In 1859, having been assigned as administrator of San Lazaro Hospital for lepers, Huerta worked hard to have the hospital reconstructed instead of being closed due to its deteriorating conditions.

== As proponent of Manila's first water system ==
In his search through financial documents during this effort, Huerta discovered the existence of a previously forgotten fund bequeathed by General Francisco Carriedo y Peredo (November 7, 1690 – September 1743), a native of Santander, Spain, who had been stationed in Manila as an officer of the Spanish Navy. He had left monies for the creation of the first water system in Manila. Huerta pursued this project as well, and as a result the municipal water system, with 153 hydrants, was inaugurated on August 23, 1882.

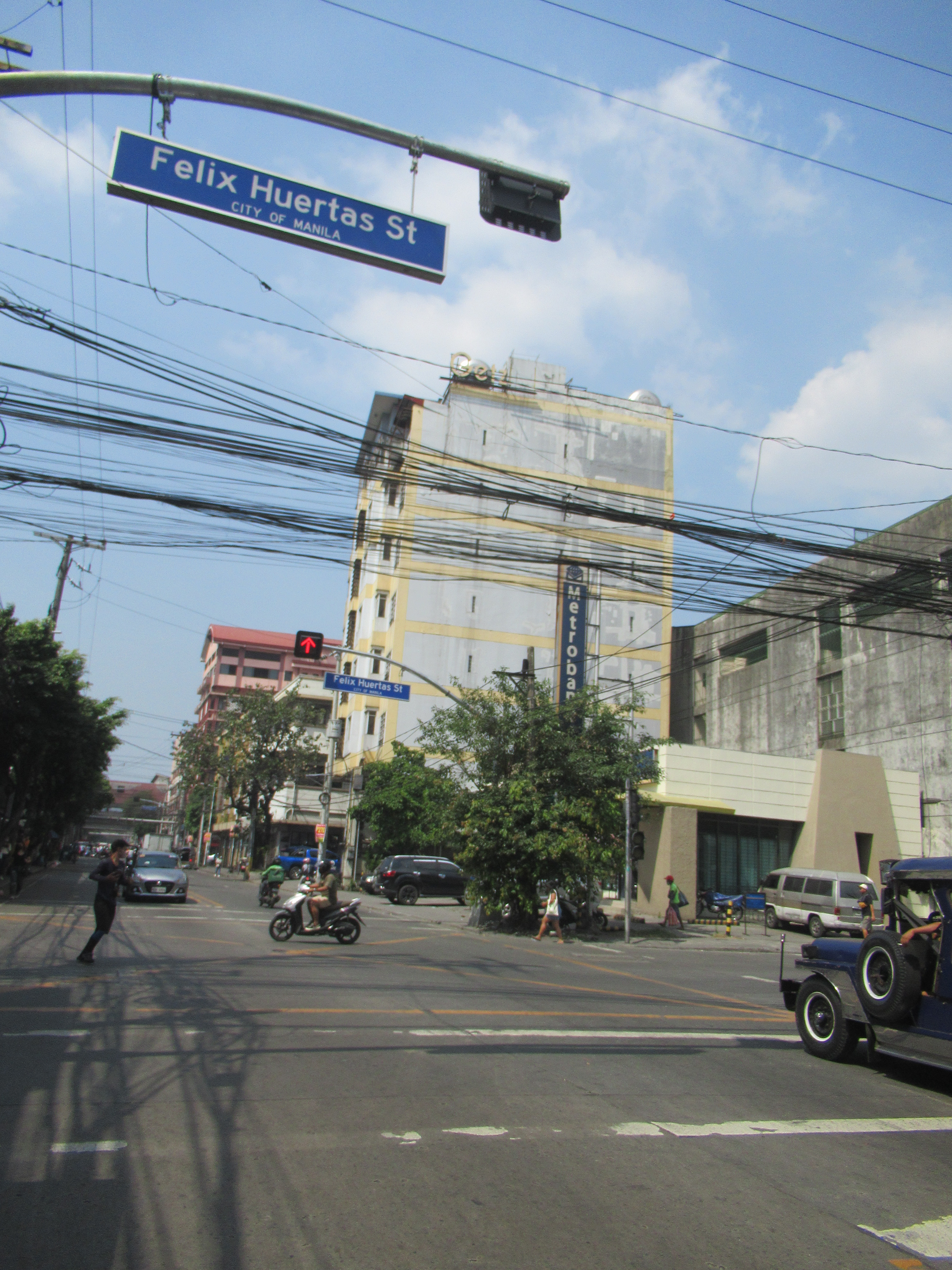
Felix Huertas Street in 2023

== Felix Huertas Street ==
Felix Huertas Street was named after Huerta.
