= Francisco Carriedo =

General of Philippines

Francisco Peredo Carriedo
- Born: Francisco Peredo Carriedo; November 7, 1690; Santander, Cantabria, Spain
- Died: November 9, 1743 (aged 53); Manila, Captaincy General of the Philippines, Spanish Empire
- Known for: Governor-General of the Philippines

Francisco Peredo Carriedo (November 7, 1690 – November 9, 1743) was a Spanish military officer, politician, and philanthropist. He was a general of the Santa Familia galleon and served as Capitán General of the Philippines.

In 1713, Carriedo was recorded to be the master of the Santo Cristo de Burgos galleon.

Carriedo is known for being the benefactor of Manila's pipe water system. As a retired Spanish Captain General in December 1733, he donated ten thousand pesos drawn from his fortune from the Acapulco-Manila investments. This donation was to the city and commercial interests of Manila and was for the establishment of waterworks for the benefit of the poor in the city. As nothing happened to this offer, he again bequeathed in a will dated July 27, 1743, the same amount and for the same purpose, with the stipulation that the fund was to be kept separate and devoted to the establishment, erection, and maintenance of waterworks. The fund was kept separate, accumulated interest, and was further enlarged by a special tax upon meat, devoted to that purpose. The will also specified that water should be given free to the San Juan de Dios Convent, gave funding to San Juan de Dios hospital, and gave free education of military officers. Carriedo did not live to see his resolve of creating a water system in Manila take fruit as the works were finally completed in 1878.

Today a museum stands on the grounds of Pinaglabanan Shrine in San Juan where the El Deposito, or the former reservoir was located, and commemorates Carriedo's contribution to the improvement of Manila's water and sewage system. The historic Carriedo Fountain, now located in Santa Cruz, Manila, was constructed and named in his honor.
