= San Lazaro Hospital =

- Department of Health
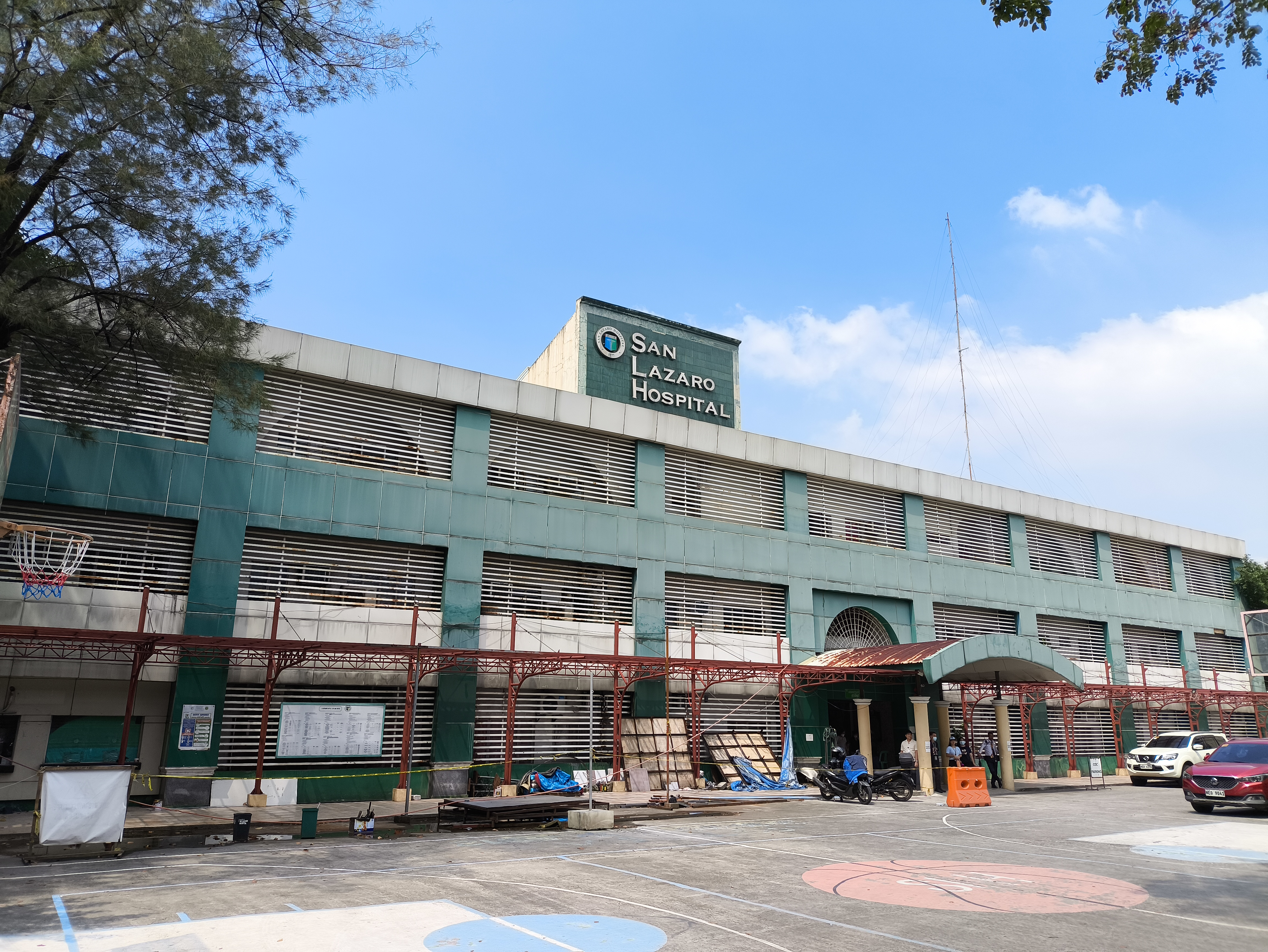
- San Lazaro Hospital in 2025

- Location in Manila Location in Metro Manila Location in Luzon Location in the Philippines

Geography
- Location: Santa Cruz, Manila, Philippines
- Coordinates: 14°36′50.5″N 120°58′53.8″E

Organization
- Religious affiliation: Franciscans (formerly)

Services
- Emergency department: Yes
- Beds: 500

History
- Founded: 1577

Links
- Website: slh.doh.gov.ph
- Lists: Hospitals in the Philippines

The San Lazaro Hospital (SLH) is a tertiary health facility in Manila, Philippines. It is a referral facility for communicable diseases and is one of the retained special tertiary hospital of the Department of Health and is funded by subsidy from the Philippine national government. It has a bed-capacity of 500. It is known as the oldest hospital in the Philippines which caters to indigents.

== History ==
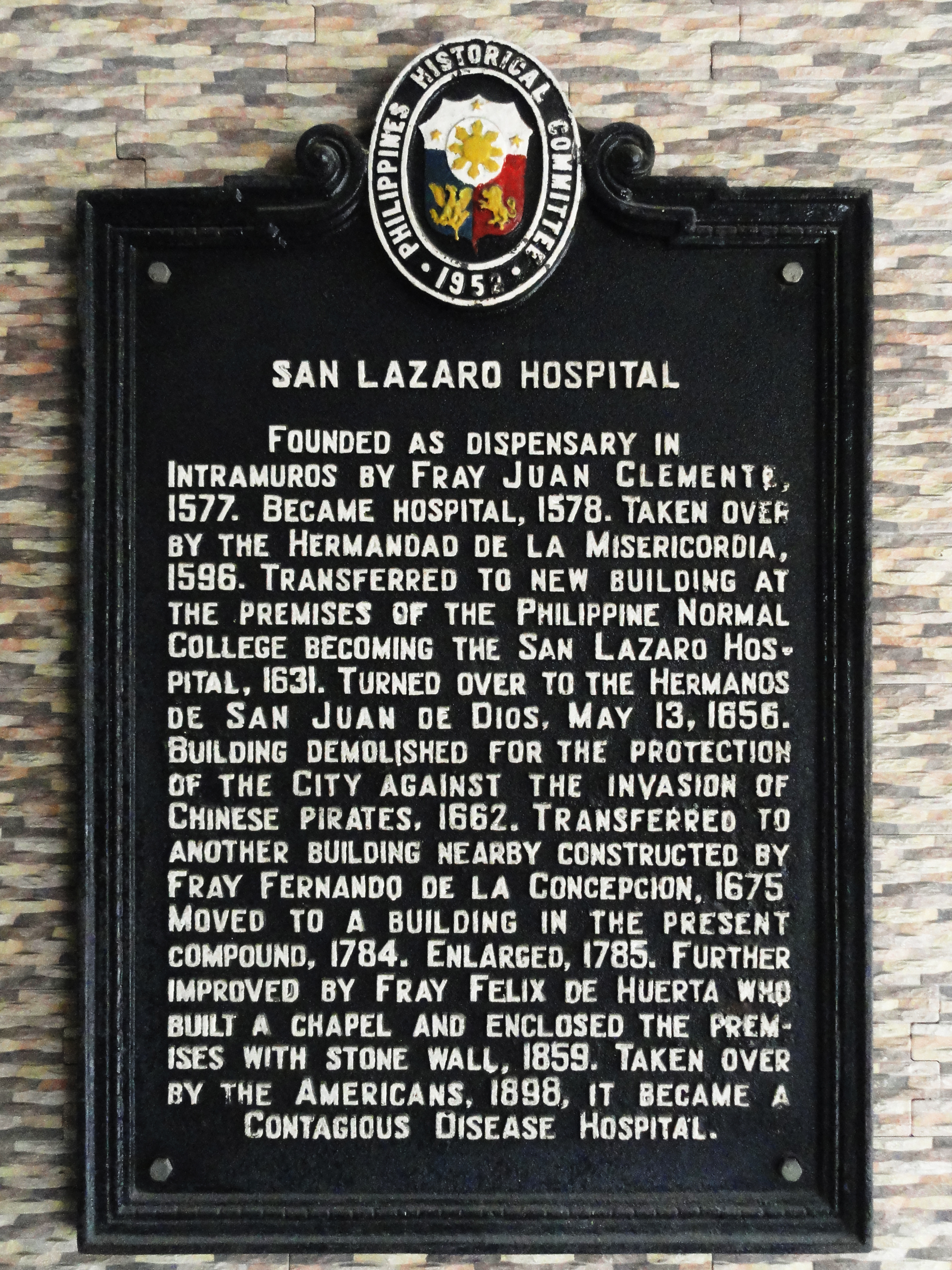
Philippines Historical Committee marker installed in 1952

The San Lazaro Hospital was established in 1577 during the Spanish colonial period as a dispensary clinic in Intramuros by Fr. Juan Clemente, a Spanish priest. In 1578, it became a hospital which catered from patients afflicted with leprosy and other diseases. In the 1590s, the hospital along with the San Juan de Dios Hospital were supported by the Hermandad de la Misericordia of secular priest and eremite Juan Fernandez de Leon.

The King of Spain issued a royal decree moving the hospital to its current site which was then known as Hacienda Mayhaligue in 1784. A chapel enclosed with stone walls was erected within hospital grounds by Fr. Felix Huerta in 1859.

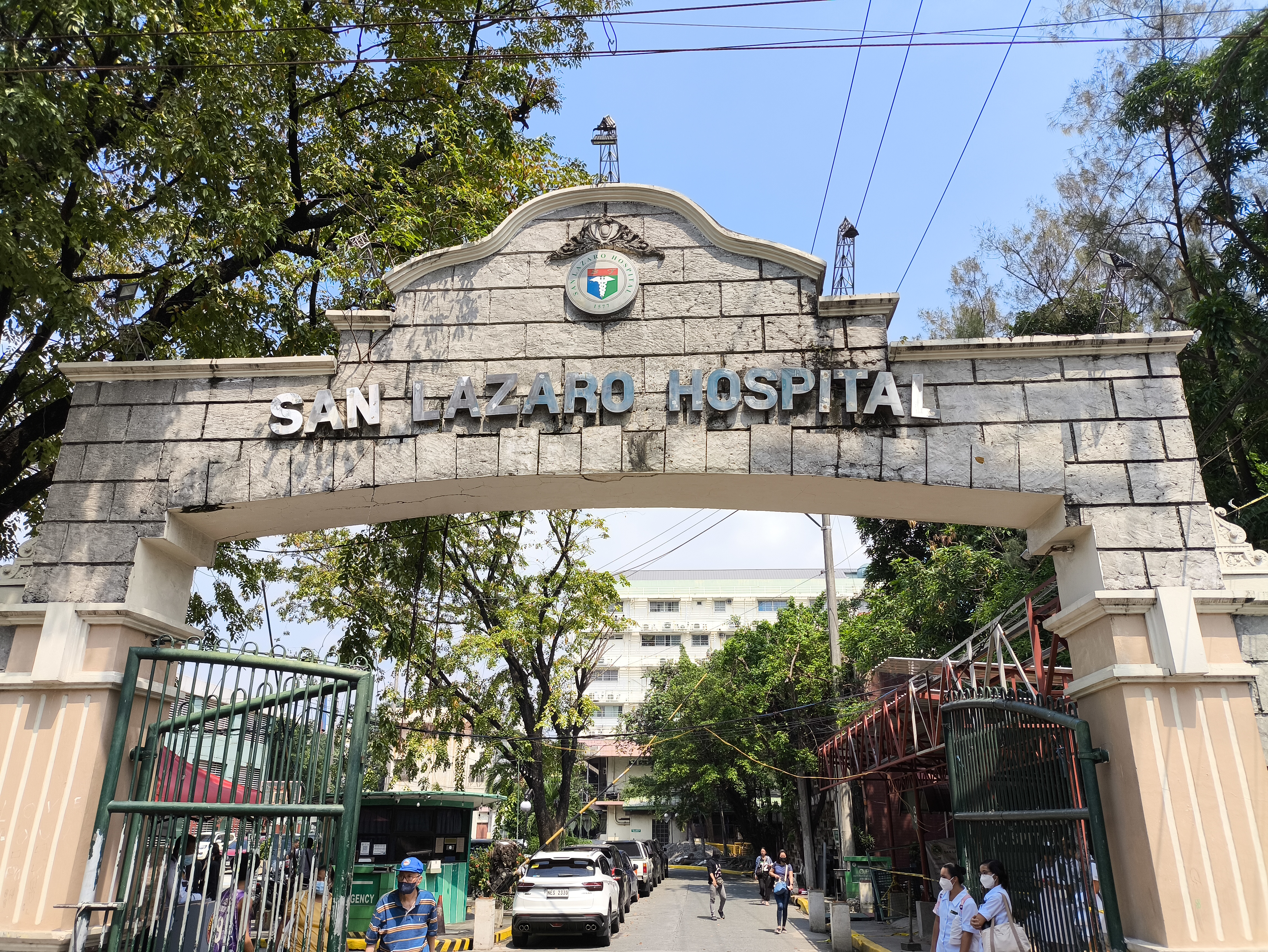
Facade of San Lazaro Hospital.

The hospital's history is connected with the 26 Martyrs of Japan. Spanish priest and leader of the Japanese protomartyrs, Pedro Bautista while he was in the Philippines was sent 134 Japanese lepers by the Tokugawa shogunate along with a note "If it is converts you want, begin with these". The lepers were admitted to the San Lazaro Hospital.

The Americans took over the administration of the hospital in 1898. The facility became a hospital specializing in contagious diseases. In 1918, the Filipinos began managing the hospital. From 1930 to 1931, San Lazaro Hospital's insane patients were admitted to the National Mental Hospital and in 1949, the hospital's patients with leprosy were moved to the Tala Leprosarium which later became known as the Dr. Jose N. Rodriguez Memorial Hospital.
