= Pinaglabanan Shrine =

Historical shrine in Metro Manila, Philippines

- Pang-alaalang Dambana ng Pinaglabanan (Filipino)
- The Spirit of Pinaglabanan
- Interactive map of Pinaglabanan Shrine
- Type: War memorial
- Location: San Juan, Manila, Philippines
- Coordinates: 14°36′17″N 121°01′52″E
- Area: 5 hectares (12 acres)
- Created: 1973
- Manager: City of San Juan; National Historical Commission of the Philippines
- Facilities: Spirit of Pinaglabanan; Museo ng Katipunan; Museo El Deposito

Pinaglabanan Memorial Shrine (Filipino: Pang-alaalang Dambana ng Pinaglabanan) is a Filipino national shrine and park along Pinaglabanan Street in the city of San Juan, Metro Manila, Philippines. This was built to commemorate the heroism of the Katipuneros who laid siege to Almacen de Polvorín, an armoury belonging to the Spanish Colonial Government, becoming the first battle of the Philippine Revolution against the Spanish Empire.

== History ==
Pinaglabanan Shrine was built in 1976 to commemorate the 1896 Battle of Pinaglabanan in the city, then known as the town of San Juan del Monte. The battle was part of a campaign by Katipunan revolutionaries, led by Andrés Bonifacio, who intended to seize El Deposito, an underground reservoir supplying water to Intramuros, and El Polvorín (the gunpowder depot). Though successful in seizing El Polvorín, the revolutionaries lost the battle, and were unable to reach El Deposito.

After years of dilapidation, a ₱50 million renovation for the park began, headed by the San Juan local government and the Department of Public Works and Highways with consultation from the National Historical Commission of the Philippines.

== Administration ==
The shrine is jointly maintained by the San Juan city government and the National Historical Commission of the Philippines.

== Features ==
The centrepiece of the shrine is the Spirit of Pinaglabanan, a brass sculpture by Eduardo Castrillo that features three figures atop a semicircular base. The National Historical Commission of the Philippines runs two museums within the park, the Museo ng Katipunan (Museum of the Pinaglabanan) and the Museo El Deposito (El Deposito Museum). The Spanish-era El Deposito underground reservoir beneath street level has since been restored and is also open to the public.

== Gallery ==
Pinaglabanan Shrine Park

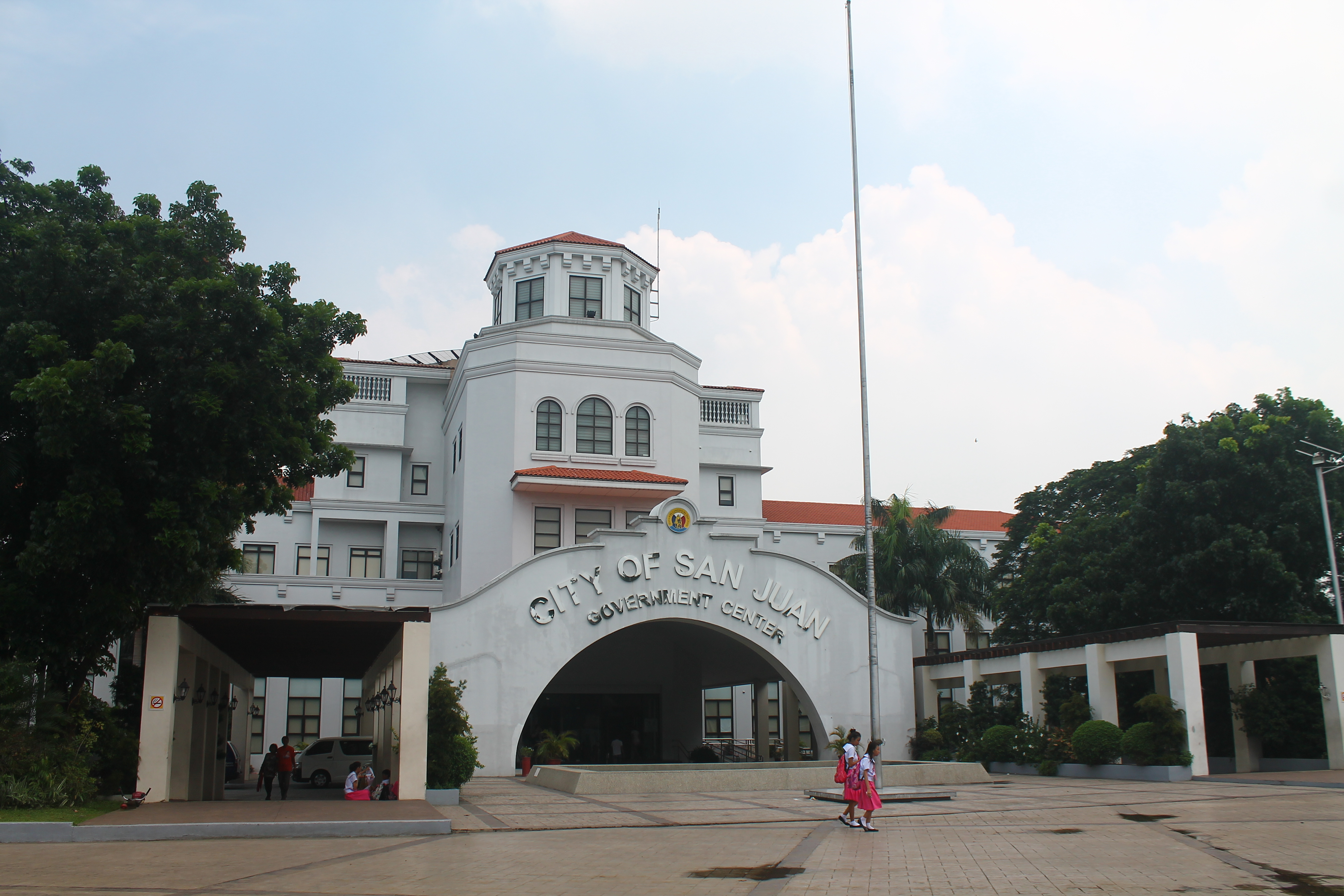
San Juan City Hall

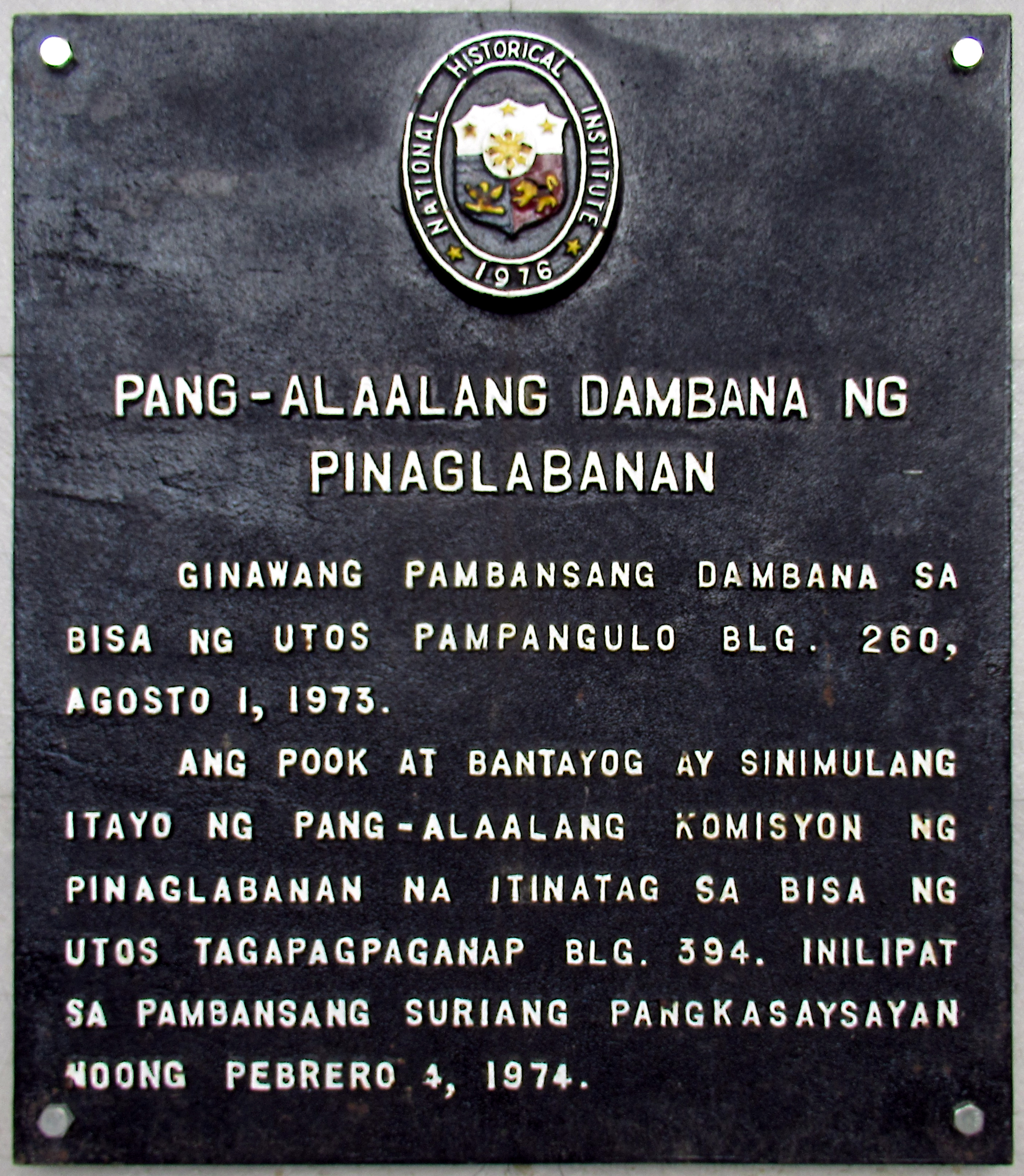
NHI historical marker, 1976

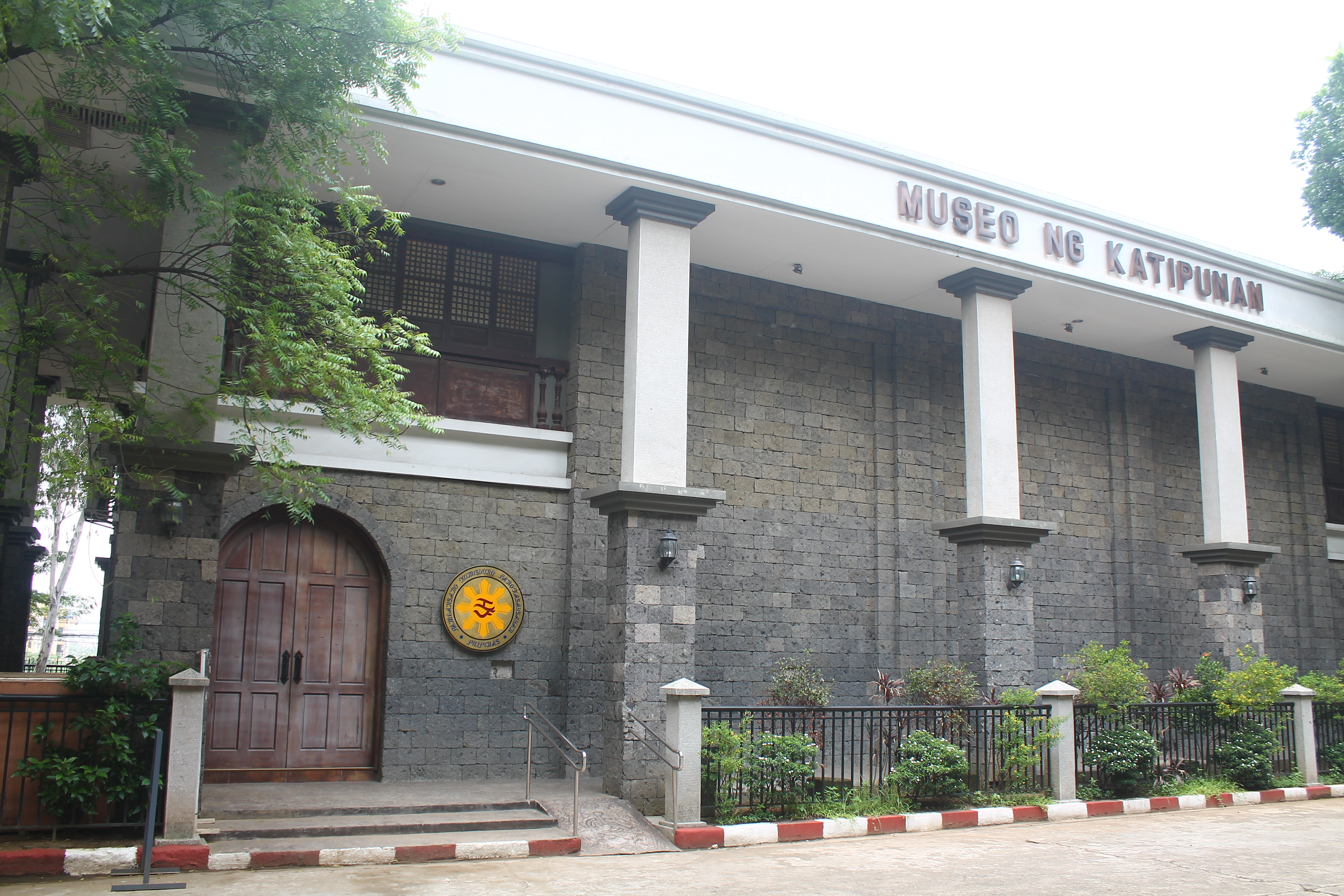
Museo ng Katipunan

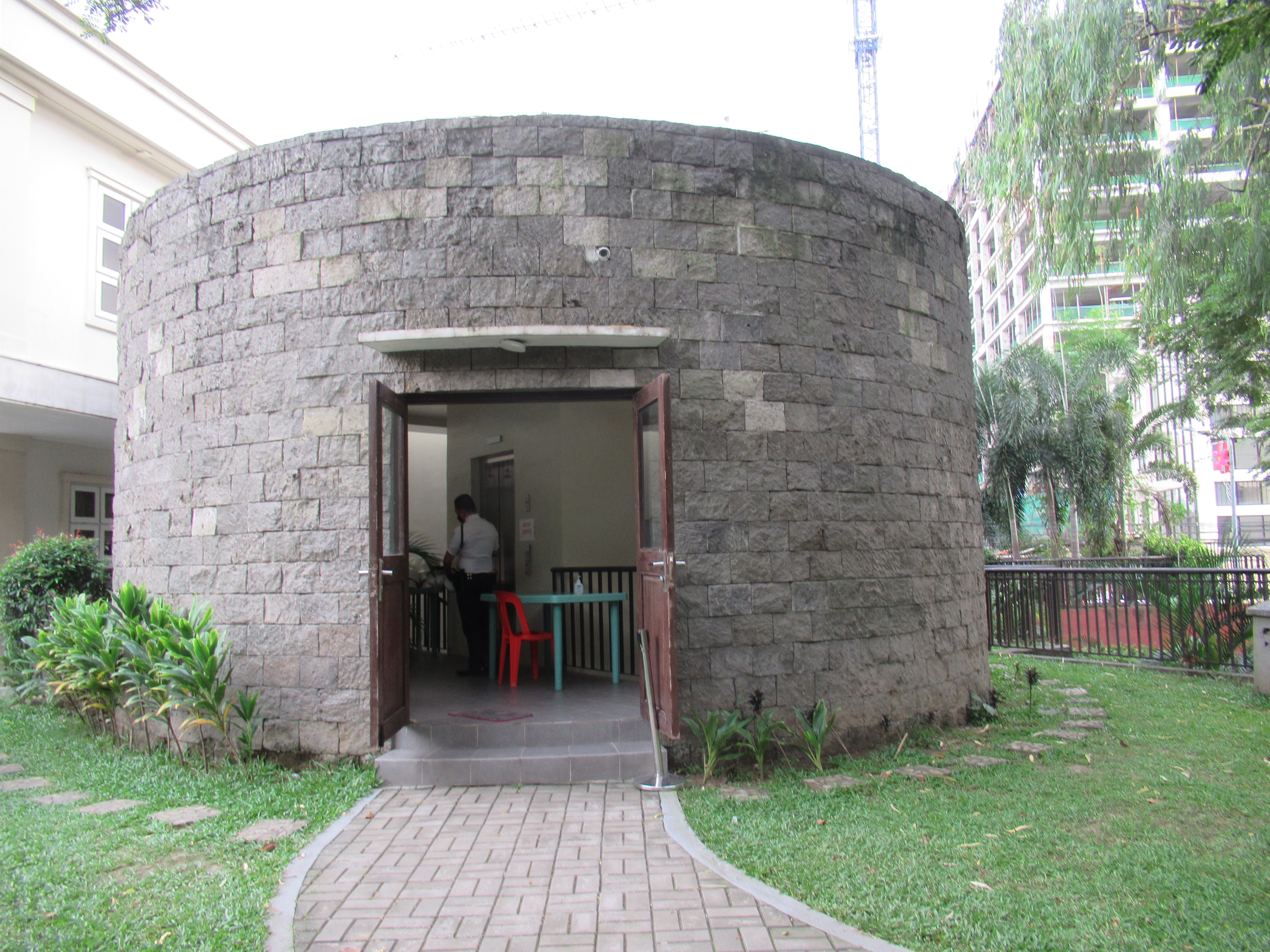
El Deposito entrance
