= El Deposito =

Water reservoir in Manila, Philippines

El Depósito
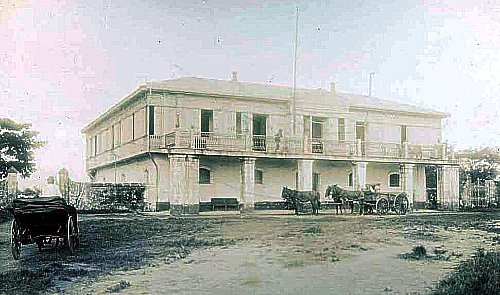
- A government building at the filter-beds of El Depósito

General information
- Status: Completed
- Location: Pinaglabanan Shrine, San Juan, Metro Manila, Philippines
- Completed: 1882
- Closed: Unknown

Design and construction
- Architect: Genaro Palacios

El Depósito (lit: The Deposit) is an old underground water reservoir in the city of San Juan in Metro Manila, Philippines. It was built by the Spanish authorities in 1882 with a capacity of 15 million gallons to provide the residents of Manila and its surrounding areas with adequate water supply. The reservoir was historically known as the site where the onset of the Philippine Revolution through the Battle of San Juan del Monte took place in 1896.

== History ==
El Depósito was part of the Carriedo Waterworks, which was built from 1878 to 1882 under Genaro Palacios, a Spanish engineer and architect who also decided to use the Marikina River as El Depósito's water source.

The underground reservoir held military strategic importance. During the Philippine Revolution, the Katipunan attempted to seize El Depósito from Spanish colonial authorities in the Battle of San Juan del Monte in 1896 and it was held by Filipinos during the Philippine-American War. It was used as an arsenal; first by the Americans during their colonial rule, then by Imperial Japanese forces as they occupied the Philippines in World War II. It also served as a pulmonary hospital housing tuberculosis patients and as a firing range. El Depósito was recaptured by Allied Forces in 1945, but it later fell to disuse after Philippine independence from the United States was proclaimed in 1946.

Efforts to rehabilitate the underground reservoir began in 2016, when the University of the Philippines Archaeological Studies program performed an assessment and excavation of the structure. The National Historical Commission of the Philippines cleaned El Depósito's tunnel in 2018 in preparation for the development of the site as a tourist destination. The rehabilitated reservoir opened to the public on November 30, 2021.

== Water Supply ==
When El Depósito still functioned as a water supply storage, it had a capacity of 56,000 cubic meters (2,000,000 ft^{3}) for 300,000 people. Ventilation shafts kept the water fresh and free from contamination. As part of the Carriedo Waterworks, the reservoir also supplied various hydrants and fountains in Manila.

From the main source of the Marikina River, water was pumped to the reservoir through 5 kilometers (3.1 mi) of cast iron pipes passing through the Santolan area. Situated below an elevated hill, the reservoir consists of a vast central channel connecting 25 smaller canals, each measuring 5 meters (16 ft) high and 3 meters (9.8 ft) wide.

== Cultural Property ==
On August 30, 1972, a marker was installed by the National Historical Commission of the Philippines in recognition of El Depósito as a cultural property. In honor of the first battle of the Philippine Revolution, the land around El Depósito was converted into the Pinaglabanan Memorial Shrine and Park.

== Gallery ==
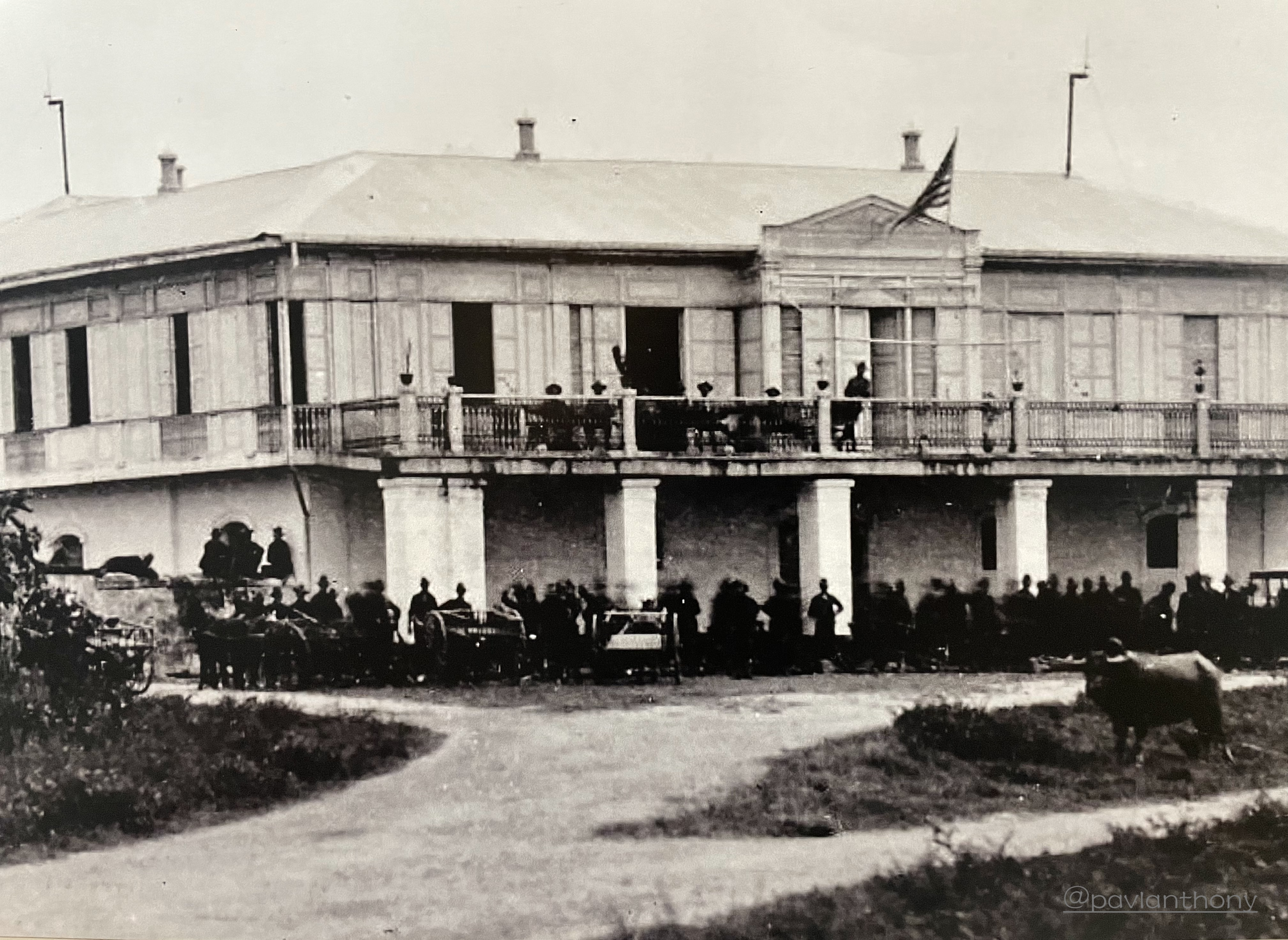
El Deposito during the early American occupation

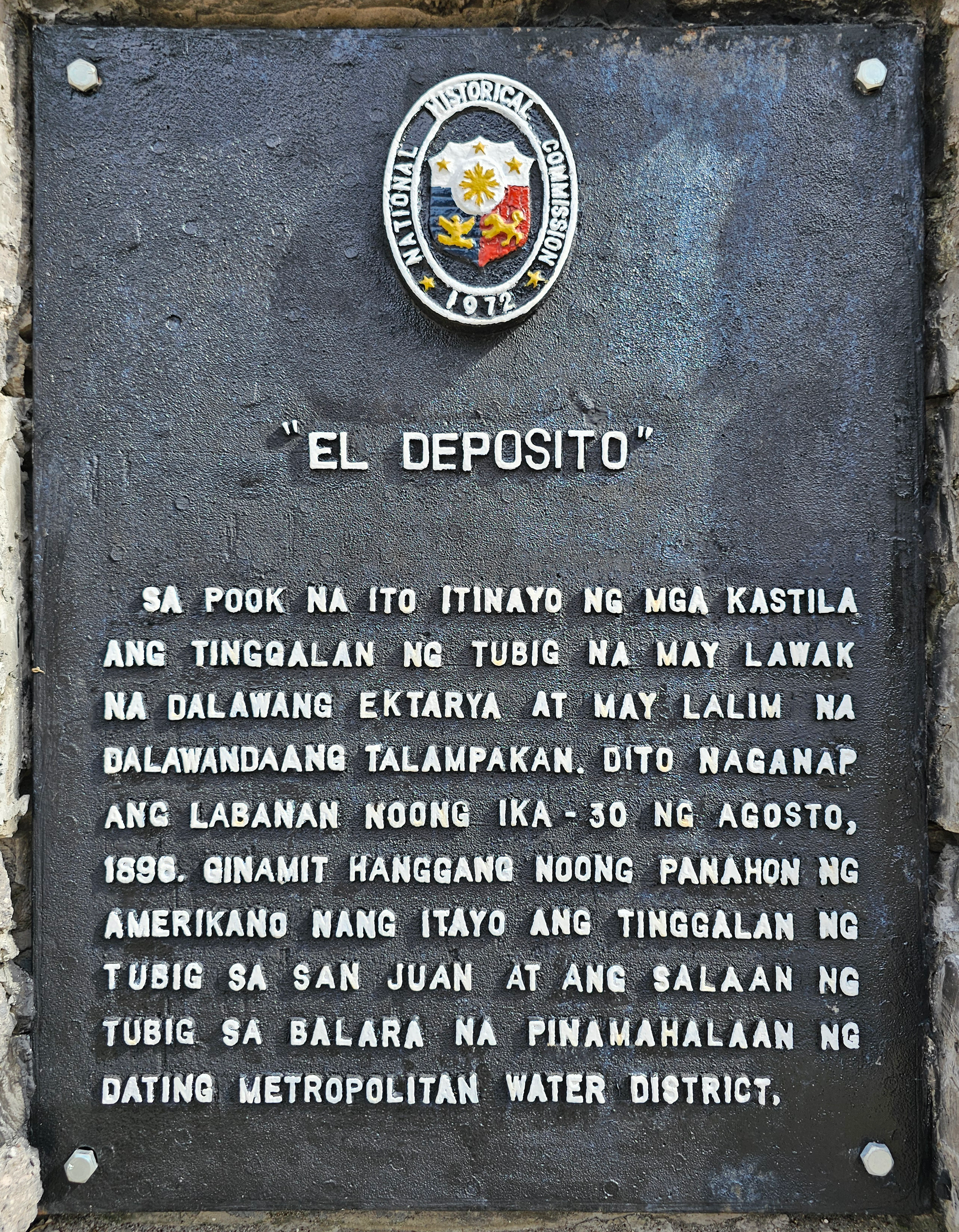
Historical marker installed in 1972

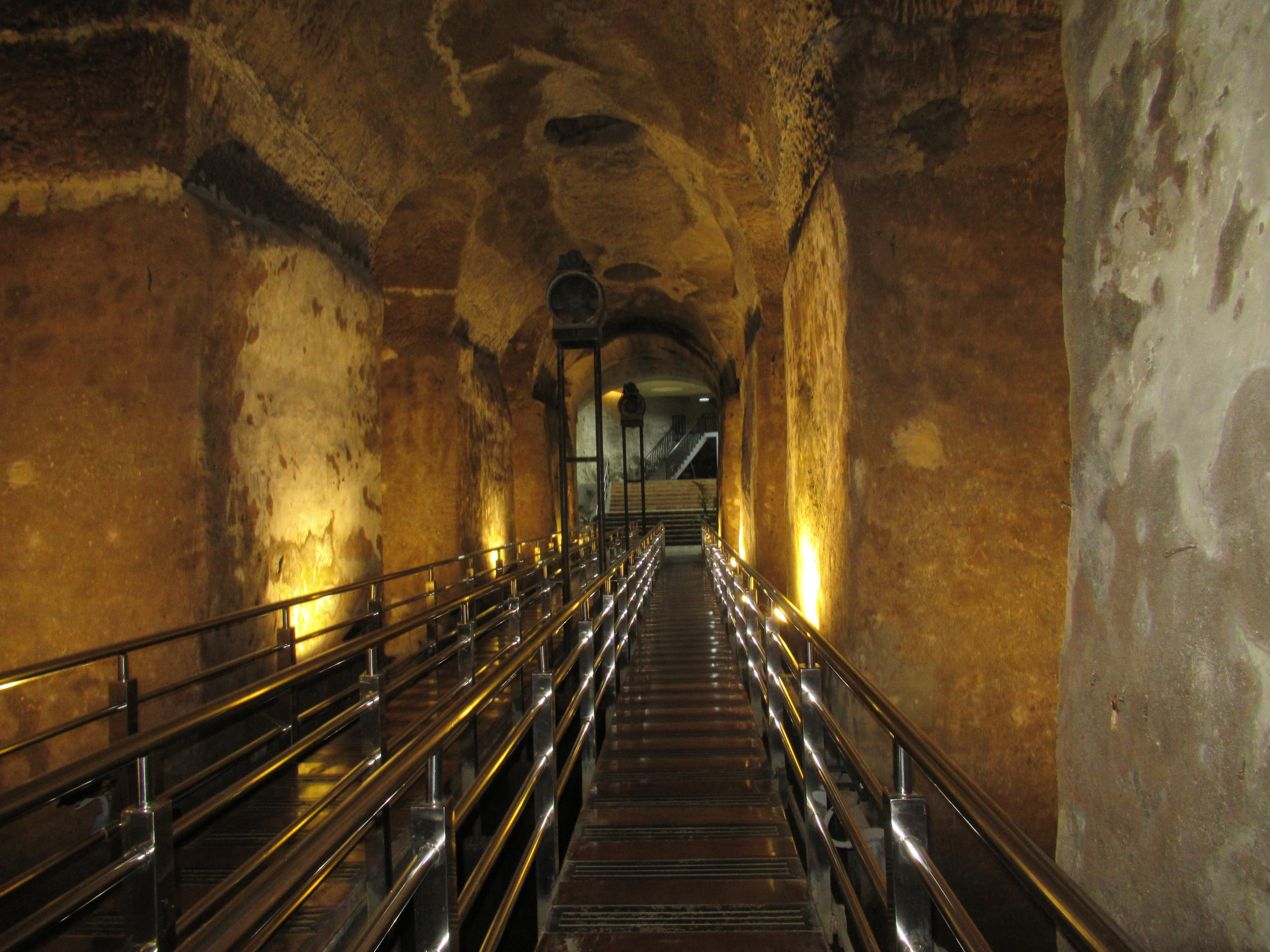
El Depósito Underground Water Reservoir
