= List of historical markers of the Philippines in Metro Manila =

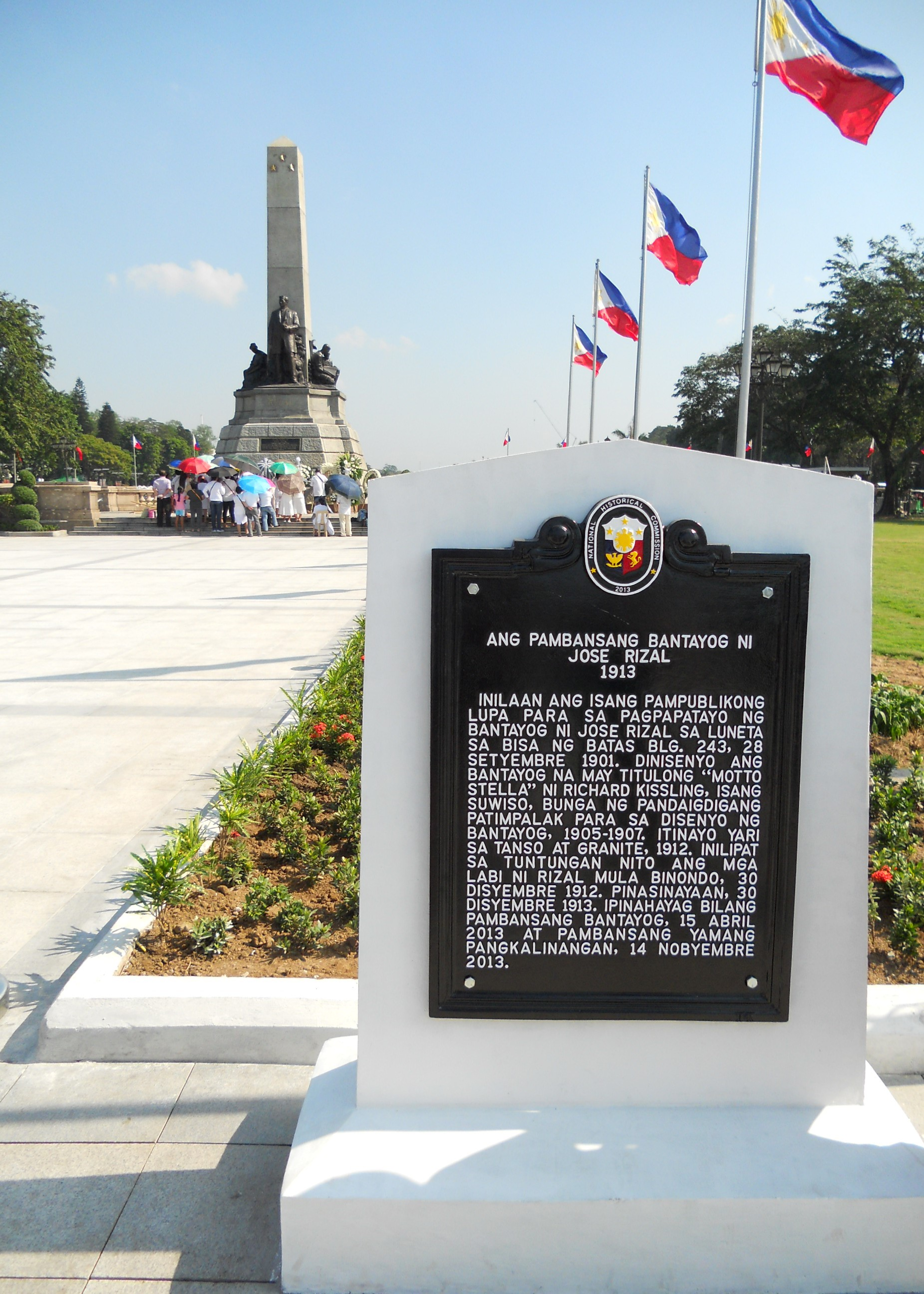
Historical marker for the Rizal Monument

This list of historical markers installed by the National Historical Commission of the Philippines (NHCP) in Metro Manila is an annotated list of people, places, or events in the region that have been commemorated by cast-iron plaques issued by the said commission. The plaques themselves are permanent signs installed in publicly visible locations on buildings, monuments, or in special locations.

While many Cultural Properties have historical markers installed, not all places marked with historical markers are designated into one of the particular categories of Cultural Properties.

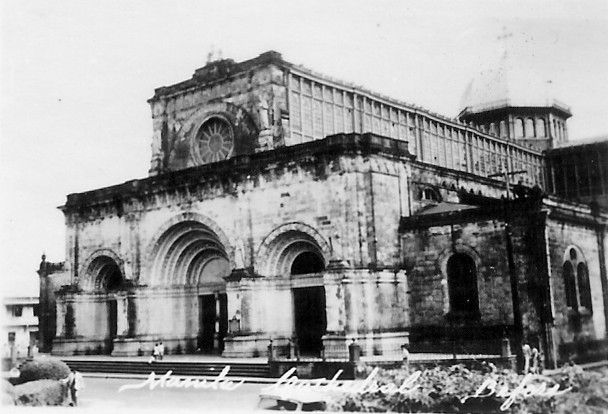
American-era historical marker installed on one of the piers of the Manila Cathedral façade.

Markers in Manila were first to be installed, following the establishment of the Philippine Historical Research and Markers Committee (PHRMC), the earliest predecessor of the NHCP. These were markers installed in 1934 for Church of San Agustin, Fort Santiago, Plaza McKinley, Roman Catholic Cathedral of Manila, San Sebastian Church, Concordia College, Manila Railroad Company, Dr. Lorenzo Negrao, Church of Nuestra Señora de Guia, and University of Santo Tomas (Intramuros site). The installation of markers were first limited to identify antiquities in Manila. Many markers were destroyed or lost due to World War II, along with the structures they represent, and many have been replaced by post-war markers.

In 2002, during the unveiling ceremony of the marker National Federation of Women's Club in the Philippines in Manila Hotel, former president Fidel Ramos joked that the curtain raising reminded him of striptease, and everybody laughed. That was the last time that the curtains were pulled upward, and from then, the unveiling has involved curtain pulling instead.

Following the move to relocate the marker of the first shot of the Filipino-American War from San Juan Bridge to the corner of Sociego and Silencio, Santa Mesa, Manila, former NHI Chairperson Ambeth Ocampo was declared persona non grata in San Juan. The NHCP then issued a replacement marker on the bridge, indicating it as a boundary between Filipino and American soldiers during the war, instead of it being the site of the first shot.

A 2023 study done by Ronnie Miravite Casalmir however placed the correct location of the first shot of the Philippine-American War at the corner of Sociego St. and Tomas Arguelles St., not at Sociego-Silencio where they erroneously have the marker. The Ronnie Miravite Casalmir Study debunks the previous findings of Dr. Benito Legarda which was the basis for the erroneous placement of the marker at Sociego-Silencio. According to Ronnie Miravite Casalmir, the smoking gun for the Sociego-Arguelles corner is the presence of Blockhouse 7 in the background of Grayson's reenactment photo. The orientation of this Blockhouse 7 image lines up with the corner of Sociego and Arguelles when compared with the known photo of Blockhouse 7 taken from the same direction. In addition, the distance estimate of Lieut. Whedon placed the 100-yard distance from Santol at Sociego-Arguelles, not Sociego-Silencio. This meant that when Lieut. Whedon ordered the detachment at Santol to patrol 100 yards, he meant them to patrol all the way to Sociego-Arguelles. Col. Stotsenburg corroborated Lieut. Whedon's distance estimate. Prof. Ambeth R. Ocampo calls the evidence presented by Ronnie Miravite Casalmir as new and compelling. Prof. Ocampo agrees that this evidence shows that the marker should be moved one block away, from Sociego-Silencio to Sociego-Arguelles. Maj. Lillian A. Pfluke (Ret.), West Point Class of 1980, and founder of the American War Memorials Overseas Inc. also agrees and has a note on their U.S. War Memorials website that the proper placement of the marker should be at the adjoining intersection of Sociego Street and Arguelles Street where the incident actually occurred.

The marker concerning the First Congress of the Republic of the Philippines 1946-1949 was the biggest marker made, measuring at 52x72 inches. The 1946 marker was replaced on January 27, 2010, when governor Carlos Padilla of Nueva Vizcaya asked why his father, Constancio Padilla was missing from the list of the legislators. Luis Taruc, Jesus Lava, and Amado Yuson of the Democratic Alliance were not in the marker even though they appeared in the Congressional Records, while Luis Clarin, Carlos Fortich, and Narciso Ramos were in the 1946 marker, but not in the present Congressional Records. The Taruc, Lava, and Yuzon were dismissed from Congress, although the latter moved to the Nacionalista Party. Fortich died before completing his term and was replaced by his widow, Remedios Ozamis Fortich. Ramos won as the congressman for the 5th district of Pangasinan, but was appointed soon after to the United Nations, and was replaced by Cipriano Allas.

The historical marker (installed in 1939) of the Jesuit institution La Ignaciana in Santa Ana, Manila was stolen. A replacement marker was planned to be installed by the end of 2014, but this never took place.

The historical marker dedicated to Patricio Mariano in Escolta, Binondo received social media attention regarding its then derelict state. On January 28, 2015, on the occasion of Mariano's 80th death anniversary, the Escolta Revival Movement wrote to the NHCP regarding the situation of the marker. The NHCP renovated the marker the day after.

Days before the Bonifacio Day of 2017, reports surfaced of the demolition of the Bonifacio centennial monument in Makati, along with its historical marker (entitled "Memorare"). This was done by the Department of Public Works and Highways to build a bridge connecting Ortigas and Bonifacio Global City business districts without informing and seeking the approval of the NHCP. DPWH, however, stated that it had informed the local government unit and temporarily removed the statue to protect it from the construction. The department also said that it had allotted ₱39 million for the restoration of the park after the project was completed in 2020.

A statue and marker (entitled Filipina Comfort Women Statue and "Memorare," respectively), remembering the comfort women of World War II, installed on December 8, 2017, along Baywalk, Roxas Boulevard, Malate, Manila, caught the attention of officials from the Department of Foreign Affairs and the Japanese Embassy in Manila. In response, Teresita Ang-See, said that the memorial should not become an insult to Japan. On April 27, 2018, the DPWH removed the memorial for a drainage improvement project along the Baywalk. Many individuals and groups, including Gabriela Women's Party, condemned the removal, calling it historical revisionism and submission to Japanese policy. They said that this was an unlawful removal, since the heritage act protects markers and memorials by the NHCP. President Duterte remarked that the memorial could be placed on a private property, since the state would not want to "antagonize" other countries.

This article lists 553 markers from the National Capital Region.

== Caloocan ==
This table lists two markers from the city of Caloocan.

Marker title	Description	Location	Language	Date issued	Image
Bantayog ni Andres Bonifacio (Note: Andres Bonifacio Monument)	Monument dedicated to the lifework of Andrés Bonifacio. Designed by national artist Guillermo E. Tolentino.	Bonifacio Monument, Rotunda	Filipino	2009	
Katedral ng Kaloocan (Note: Cathedral of Caloocan)	Became a headquarters of General Luna when the 20th Kansas Infantry invaded Caloocan.	Caloocan Cathedral façade, A. Mabini Street corner 10th Avenue, Poblacion	Filipino	March 31, 2022	

== Las Piñas ==
This table lists five markers from the city of Las Piñas.

Marker title	Description	Location	Language	Date issued	Image
Las Piñas Bamboo Organ	The only bamboo organ ever made and in existence. Constructed by Fr. Diego Cera from 1818 to 1822.	Fr. Diego Cera Avenue, Daniel Fajardo	English		
Simbahan ng Las Piñas (Note: Church of Las Piñas)	Established as a pueblo in 1762. Home of the bamboo organ.	Las Piñas Church façade, Fr. Diego Cera Avenue, Daniel Fajardo	Filipino	July 27, 1995	
Simbahan ng Parokya ng San Jose, Las Piñas (Note: Church of the Parish of St. Joseph, Las Piñas)	Declared as a national historical landmark by the NHCP.	Las Piñas Church façade, Fr. Diego Cera Avenue, Daniel Fajardo	Filipino	February 28, 2014	
Labanan sa Zapote (Note: Battle of Zapote)	Where Filipinos fought against the Spanish in 1897 and the Americans in 1899.	Zapote Road, Las Piñas-Bacoor Border	Filipino	March 10, 2015	
Molino Dam	Constructed from the designs of Fray Hilario Bernal. Repaired by Fray Ezekiel Moreno. Bridge between Las Piñas and Bacoor	Onelia Jose St., Las Piñas	Filipino	December 1, 2017	

== Makati ==
This table lists 18 markers from the city of Makati.

Marker title	Description	Location	Language	Date issued	Image
Ayala y Compañia (Note: Ayala and Company)	Founded in 1834 by Don Antonio de Ayala and Don Domingo Roxas at Echague.	Ayala Tower One, Ayala Avenue (in storage)	Spanish	1951	
Bank of the Philippine Islands	First bank in the Philippines. Founded under the decree of Queen Isabela II on August 1, 1851.	(unknown - former HQ demolished to make way for new building under construction)	English	August 1, 2001	
Church and Monastery of Guadalupe	Church foundation laid by the Augustinians in 1601. Church construction completed in 1629.	Guadalupe Church façade, 7440 Bernardino St., Guadalupe Viejo	Filipino	1937	
Dambana ng Banal na Krus (Note: Shrine of the Holy Cross)	Building commissioned by Manuel Cadedoc in 1882, relocated to the current site in 1918.	Holy Cross Parish Church, JP. Rizal Ave., Brgy. Tejeros	Filipino	1991	
Dental Profession in the Philippines	Began in 1850, with the arrival of Frenchman M. Fertri from Hong Kong.	Philippine Dental Association Building, Ayala Avenue	English	1961	
Elizalde y Compañia (Sucesores de Ynchausti y Compañia) (Note: Elizalde and Company (Successors of Ynchausti and Company))	Manor house founded by J. Ynchausti, J. Elizalde, and V. Teus in 1854.	Elizalde Building, Ayala Avenue	Spanish	1951	
Ang Gusali ng Punonghimpilan sa Pagsasanay Militar ng Mamamayan sa Metropolitan Manila (Note: The Headquarters for the Military Training of the Citizens of Metropolitan Manila)	Built for the American troops in the Philippines during the time of Douglas MacArthur from 1928 to 1930.	MTMTC	Filipino	April 1, 1984	
The Insular Life Assurance Company, Ltd.	First insurance company organized by Filipinos on November 25, 1910. First Philippine company to have a branch overseas in Hawaii in 1935.	Insular Life Building, Ayala Avenue cor. Paseo de Roxas (originally in Binondo, Manila)	English	1951	
Makati	Formerly known as San Pedro Makati (Sampiro) and was part of the visita of Santa Ana de Sapa.	Façade of the old Makati City Hall building.	Filipino	November 11, 1991	
Nielson Tower	The control tower of the first airport of the Philippines, built in 1937.	Nielson Tower, Makati Avenue	Filipino	March 22, 1996	
Philippine Bar Association	Established to promote the rule of law. A bastion of human rights during the martial law era starting 1972.	Philippine Bar Association	Filipino	June 26, 1992	
Philippine Dental Association	Established as a legal profession, January 10, 1903. The institution was the merger of Sociedad Dental de Filipinas (1908) and National Dental Association (1925).	Philippine Dental Association Building, Ayala Ave.	Filipino	September 2, 2008	
Philippine Merchants Marine					
Pio Isidro y Castañeda (1865–1931)	Katipunan general, exiled to Guam during the American occupation.	Victor St. cor. E. Jacinto St., Pio del Pilar	Filipino	November 30, 1983	
San Pedro Macati	Established by the Jesuits in 1620 and administered until 1768.	Makati Church façade, 39 D.M. Rivera St. Poblacion	English	1937	
Smith, Bell & Co., Inc.	Founded in 1846 by Henry Constable and Robert Wood. Subsidiary firm of Smith, Constable and Company of Liverpool.	Manila Polo Club	English	March 19, 1996	
Vuelo-Madrid-Manila (Note: Madrid-Manila Flight)	Spanish captains opened a new air route to the east on April 5, 1926.	Nichols Field	Spanish		

== Malabon ==
This table lists five markers from the city of Malabon.

Marker title	Description	Location	Language	Date issued	Image
Birthplace of Gregorio Sanciangco	Lawyer, economist, and writer. Member of the reform movement led by Rizal.	40 Sanciangco Street, Niugan	English	1952	
Gregorio Sanciangco y Goson	Lawyer, participated in movements led by Rizal.	24 Sanciangco, Tonsuya	Filipino	1952	
Salvador Z. Araneta (1902–1982)	Born on January 31, 1902. Founder of FEATI University, Gregorio Araneta University Foundation, and Philippine Constitution Association.	De La Salle Araneta University, Victoneta Avenue, Potrero, Malabon City	Filipino	January 30, 2002	
Simbahan ng San Bartolome (Note: Church of San Bartolome)	Founded as a visita of Tondo on May 21, 1599. Andrés Bonifacio, after the Cry of Pugad Lawin, held a meeting during the feast of St. Bartholomew and disguised as pilgrims to evade the guardia civil.	Malabon Church façade, Rizal Avenue Extension, Bgy. San Agustin	Filipino	August 27, 2015	
Ang Simbahan ng Concepcion (Note: The Church of Concepcion)	Enshrines the image of the La Inmaculada Concepcion crowned by Cardinal Jaime Sin on December 7, 1986.	Concepcion Church façade, General Antonio Luna cor. Escanilla St., Concepcion	Filipino	September 8, 2007	

== Mandaluyong ==
This table lists nine markers from the city of Mandaluyong.

Marker title	Description	Location	Language	Date issued	Image
(untitled)	The residence of Jose P. Laurel, president of the Second Philippine Republic. Erected in 1957.	Villa Paciencia, 515 S. Laurel St. corner Shaw Boulevard	English	1965	
Carmelo and Bauermann, Inc.	One of the oldest lithographic establishments in the Philippines	Epifanio de los Santos Avenue (original location: Recto Ave.)	English	1937	
Jose P. Laurel (1851–1959); Pangulo ng Republika ng Pilipinas (Note: Jose P. Laurel (1851–1959): President of the Republic of the Philippines)	Site where he was shot while playing golf on June 5, 1943. He survived.	Wack Wack Golf and Country Club	English	June 5, 1992	
Jose Rizal University	Established in 1919. Closed in 1941 to protest against Japanese occupation. Reopened in 1946.	José Rizal University, Shaw Blvd.	Filipino	February 19, 2019	
Kumbentong Agustino ng Mandaluyong (Note: Augustinian Convent of Mandaluyong)	Where Teodoro Patiño revealed to Fr. Mariano Gil the secret society Katipunan which prompted the premature spark of the Philippine revolution. Became Asilo de Mandaluyong.	Don Bosco Technical College	Filipino	September 28, 2026	
Hagdang Bato (Note: Stone Steps)	Historic meeting of Katipuneros under Andrés Bonifacio on August 29, 1896. Laureano Gonzales headed the Katipunan in Mandaluyong.	Hagdang Bato	Filipino	August 29, 1996	
National Center for Mental Health	Established December 1925, secretly admitted civilian and guerrilla patients during World War II, became National Center for Mental Health November 12, 1986.	National Center for Mental Health, Barrio Mauway, Mandaluyong	Filipino	December 17, 2014	
San Miguel Brewery, Inc.	Established 1890 as the Fabrica de Cerveza de San Miguel. Unveiled on its 125th anniversary.	San Miguel Brewery Main Office, 40 San Miguel Ave.	Filipino	September 29, 2015	
Vicente F. Fabella	First Filipino certified public accountaint; founder of Jose Rizal College, now known as Jose Rizal University	José Rizal University	Filipino	1991	

== Manila ==
This table lists 398 markers from the City of Manila, more than any city, municipality, province, and region (except NCR itself) in the Philippines.

Marker title	English translation	Category	Type	Description	Location	Language	Date issued	Image
Site of Le Gentil Astronomical Observatory					Manila	English		

=== Binondo ===
This table lists 20 markers from the Binondo district.

Marker title	Description	Location	Language	Date issued	Image
Bangko ng Kapuluang Pilipinas (Banco de las Islas Filipinas) (Note: Bank of the Philippine Islands)	The first bank in the Philippines. Established in 1851 under the name Banco Español Filipino.	Bank of the Philippine Islands site, Plaza Cervantes	Filipino	1977 (replacement of earlier marker due to loss)	
Bank of the Philippine Islands	Oldest charted bank in the Philippines founded in 1851. Renamed to BPI in 1912.	Juan Luna St., Binondo	English	January 21, 1937	
Dr. Lorenzo Negrao	Spanish physician and pharmacist who founded Botica Boie in 1830.	Escolta St.	English	1934	
Dr. Lorenzo Negrao	Founded Botica Boie in 1830. Building destroyed during WWII. A new building was built in 1952.	Escolta St.	English		
Gusali ng China Banking Corporation (Note: China Banking Corporation Building)	Constructed following the design of Arthur Gabler Gumbert	CBC Building, Dasmariñas corner Juan Luna Streets	Filipino	December 21, 2021	
Gusali ng Hongkong and Shanghai Banking Corporation (Note: Hongkong and Shanghai Banking Corporation Building)	Built between 1921 and 1922, became an office of William H. Quasha Law Office.	Old HSBC Building, Juan Luna St.	Filipino	May 27, 2024	
Gusaling Calvo (Note: Calvo Building)	Built in 1938 under the designs of Fernando Ocampo. Calvo Museum was established in 1994.	Calvo Building, Escolta St.	Filipino	August 14, 2018	
Perez-Samanillo Building	Built under the designs of Andrés Luna de San Pedro in 1928. Awarded by Manila city government as the most beautiful office building in 1928.	First United Building, Escolta St.	Filipino, English	October 16, 2018	
Mariano Limjap (1856–1926)	Businessman who helped in the Philippine Revolution and the Filipino-American War.	Juan Luna St.	Filipino	2009	
Olsen Building	One of the first reinforced buildings in the Philippines.	Escolta St.	English/Filipino	2025 (not yet officially unveiled)	
Pacific Commercial Company Building	Built in 1922, became Ayala Building from 1940 to 1959. Restored in 2007.	Juan Luna E-Services Building, Juan Luna St. Corner Muelle de la Industria, Escolta Heritage District	Filipino	December 15, 2017	
Patricio Mariano (1877–1935)	Became a writer for revolutionary pamphlets and publications. Became the first adviser of Emilio Aguinaldo.	Banquero St., Escolta	Filipino	August 13, 1977	
Peele, Hubbel & Co.	Site of the New England Commercial and Shipping House, Peele, Hubbel and Co. from 1825 to 1887. Became a leading exporter of Philippine commodities.	Recto Ave.	English	American era	
Residence of Higino Francisco	Where the original manuscript of Noli me Tángere was kept hidden.	Masangkay St.	Filipino	July 19, 1963	
Roman Ongpin (1847–1912)	Nationalist and philanthropist who helped the revolutionary forces against Spain.	Ongpin Monument, Ongpin St. cor. Quintin Paredes Rd.	Filipino	2008	
Ang Simbahan ng Binondo (Note: The Church of Binondo)	Main church of Binondo district. Established by the Dominicans for the Chinese in 1587.	Binondo Church façade, Plaza San Lorenzo Ruiz	Filipino	May 14, 1972	
Ang Tahanan ng Kaanak ni Rizal (1893–1896) (Daang San Jose Ngayo'y Magdalena), Maynila (Note: The Rizal Residence (1893–1896) (San Jose Road Now Magdalena), Manila)	Where Rizal's parents Francisco Mercado Rizal and Teodora Alonzo lived.	525 Magdalena (now Masangkay)	Filipino	1963	
Tahanan ng Kinamatayan ng Ama ni Rizal (Note: House Where the Father of Rizal Died)	Where the urn of José Rizal's remains was kept and where his father, Francisco Mercado Rizal, died.	619 Estraude	Filipino	1960	
Tiong Se Academy	Chinese school established by Tan Kang, first Chinese consul to the Philippines in 1899	Tiong Se Academy, Sta. Elena St.	Filipino	September 5, 2013	
William J. Burke (1873–1946)	The first cardiologist in the Philippines to use the electrocardiograph.	Burke Building, Burke St. cor. Escolta St.	Filipino	February 26, 1993	

=== Ermita ===
This table lists 97 markers from the Ermita district.

Marker title	English translation	Category	Type	Description	Location	Language	Date issued	Image
				Site of the massacre of Vincentian priests and civilians during WWII.	(currently within NHCP storage)	English	1995	
				Site of the massacre of health professionals and patients who killed by the Japanese during WWII.	Philippine National Red Cross, UN Avenue cor. Gen. Luna (currently within NHCP storage)	English	1995	
		Site	Site	Site of the execution of Gomez, Burgos, and Zamora (collectively known as GOMBURZA).	Gomburza execution site, Rizal Park	Spanish	1953; February 17, 1998	
		Site	Site	Site of the execution of Gomez, Burgos, and Zamora (Collectively known as GOMBURZA).	Gomburza execution site, Rizal Park	English	1990	
Adamson University		Building	School	School established as Adamson School of Industrial Chemistry in 1932 by George Lucas Adamson.	Adamson University Main Building, San Marcelino St.	Filipino	February 8, 2007	
Ang Aklatang Pambansa	The National Library			Started as the American Circulating Library, 1900, and was entrusted to the Philippine government in 1901.	National Library, T.M. Kalaw St.	Filipino	January 1, 1969 (marker replaced, 2022, see Pambansang Aklatan ng Pilipinas)	
Andres Bonifacio		Site	Monument	Founder of the Katipunan, and started the revolution against the Spaniards.	Liwasang Bonifacio	Filipino, English	November 30, 1979; 1980 (English marker, no unveiling)	
Andres Bonifacio							November 30, 1997	
Andres Bonifacio		Site	Monument	Founder of the Katipunan, advocated for the unification of islands and armed struggle against the Spaniards.	Bonifacio Monument, Liwasang Bonifacio	Filipino	2013	
Angela Valdez Ramos (1905–1977)				Educator and civic leader. Headed the campaign for women suffrage in the Philippines from 1936 to 1937.	Escoda St. cor. San Marcelino	Filipino	January 4, 2005	
Apolinario Mabini		Monument	Personage	Declared a national monument by the National Historical Commission of the Philippines, March 30, 2015.	Mabino Monument, National Library, T.M. Kalaw St.	Filipino	July 23, 2015	
Asociacion Feminista Filipina (Feminist Association of the Philippines)				Founded June 30, 1905. Became the first women's club in the Philippines.	National Federation of Women's Clubs of the Philippines (NFWC) Building, 962 Josefa Llanes Escoda St.	Filipino	1955	
Asociacion Feminista Filipina (Samahang Feminista ng Pilipinas)	Feminist Association of the Philippines			Founded June 30, 1905. Concepcion Felix became first president.	National Federation of Women's Clubs of the Philippines (NFWC) Building, 962 Josefa Llanes Escoda St.	English	September 21, 2005	
Botanical Garden				Established in 1850 by Governor Fernándo Norzagaray.	Arroceros	English	American era	
Boy Scouts of the Philippines		Building / structures		Organized as part of the Boy Scouts of America in 1923. The Commonwealth created the Boy Scouts of the Philippines in 1936.	Boy Scouts of the Philippines Building	English	1956	
Bulwagang Lungsod ng Maynila	Manila City Hall	Building	Government center	First city hall of Manila was built as the Ayuntamiento in 1571. Current building was completed in 1941.	Manila City Hall	Filipino	June 24, 1977	
The Session Hall of the Senate of the Philippines				The session hall of the Senate of the Philippines from 1946 until their relocation to the GSIS Building in 1998.	National Museum, P. Burgos Ave.	Filipino, English	October 16, 1996	
Bulwagang Villamor (Note: Villamor Hall)				Designed by Juan Arellano in 1930, former seat of the Supreme Court.	Supreme Court Old Building, Taft Ave. cor. Padre Faura St.	Filipino	November 3, 2026	
Cannon at the South Side, National Library - Legislative Building				Cannon cast at Trubia, Spain. Was used in the battles of the Philippine Revolution and the Philippine–American War.	National Museum, P. Burgos Ave.	English		
Cannon on the South Side of the Legislative Building				Used at the Cavite arsenal during the Spanish–American War.	National Museum, P. Burgos Ave.	English		
Casino Español de Manila	Spanish Casino of Manila	Building	Social club	Only club by the Spanish living in the Philippines. Established in 1893.	Casino Español de Manila, T. M. Kalaw St.	Filipino	1993, October 8, 1993	
Central United Methodist Church		Building	House of worship	First Protestant church established in the Philippines. Established on March 5, 1899.	Central United Methodist Church façade, T. M. Kalaw St.	Filipino	May 29, 1985	
Church of Nuestra Señora de Guia				Captured by the British in 1762 in preparation of their invasion of Manila.	Ermita Church, Del Pilar St.	English	1934	
Church of San Vicente de Paul		Building	House of worship	Chapel built in 1883 used as the parish church of Paco from 1898 to 1909.	San Marcelino St.	English	1935	
Colegio de Santa Isabel	Santa Isabel College			First normal school for girls in the Philippines		English		
Compañia General de Tabacos de Filipinas	Tobacco Company of the Philippines			Founded in 1881 by the Marqués de Comillas. Played a role in the economic development of the Philippines.	Compañia General de Tabacos de Filipinas, Romualdez St.	Spanish	1951	
Cosmopolitan Church		Building	House of worship	Protestant church built in 1936 under the Philippine Methodists.	Taft Avenue cor. Apacible St.	Filipino	March 20, 2005	
Elpidio R. Quirino (1890–1958)				President of the Republic of the Philippines from 1948 to 1956. Born in Vigan on November 16, 1890.	Quirino Grandstand	Filipino	November 15, 1990	
Embassy of the United States of America Chancery				Opened in 1940 to house the offices and residence of U.S. High Commissioner Francis B. Sayre,	U.S. Embassy	English	September 22, 2005	
Ermita Science Community				Birthplace of the scientific community, started as Bureau of Government Laboratories in 1901. Site of agencies under the DOST.	National Institutes of Health, UP Manila	Filipino	February 27, 1992	
Fernando Ma. Guerrero				Lawyer and poet. Prince of Philippine lyric. Editor at the El Renacimiento.	Peralta Apartment	Filipino	June 12, 1983	
The First Congress of the Republic of the Philippines; 1946 ~ 1949				Members of the First Congress of the Republic of the Philippines from 1946 to 1949.	Rizal Park flagpole, Roxas Blvd.	English	1946; January 27, 2010	
Girl Scouts of the Philippines				Scouting movement for girls established by Josefa Llanes Escoda.	GSP National Headquarters, 901 Padre Faura St.	Filipino	December 28, 1990	
Grand Lodge of Free and Accepted Masons of the Philippines				Primary, independent, and national masonic institute. Established on December 19, 1912, with the permission of the Grand Lodge of California.	San Marcelino	Filipino	December 19, 1987	
Gusaling Army and Navy Club	Army and Navy Club Building			Declared as a national historical landmark by the NHCP.	Rizal Park Hotel (Manila Army and Navy Club), South Drive	Filipino	June 29, 1991	
Gusaling Army and Navy Club	Army and Navy Club Building			Designed by William E. Parsons. Reconstructed in 1945.	Rizal Park Hotel (Manila Army and Navy Club Building), South Drive	Filipino and English	December 30, 2020	
Gusali ng Dulaang Metropolitan	Metropolitan Theater Building			Declared as a national historical landmark by the NHCP.	Metropolitan Theater	Filipino	1976	
Gusali ng Elks Club	Elks Club Building	Building	Clubhouse	Currently as the Children's Museum of Manila. Designed by William E. Parsons in 1907.	Museo Pambata, Roxas Boulevard	Filipino	November 2002	
Gusali ng Lungsod ng Maynila	Manila City Hall			First city hall building constructed on this site was completed in 1904.	Inside Manila City Hall	Filipino	1977	
Harris Memorial College				Oldest center of Bible training center of the Methodists for girls in Southeast Asia.	Taft Ave.	Filipino	October 24, 1986	
Dr. Honorato L. Quisumbing				Site where he was felled by sniper while attending to the sick.	Philippine General Hospital (currently within NHCP storage)	English		
Josefa Llanes Escoda		Personages	Biographical marker	Started the Girl Scouts of the Philippines in 1939.	Girl Scout of the Philippines, Padre Faura St.	Filipino	September 20, 2024	
Ang Kapilya ng Ermita	Ermita Chapel			Declared as a national historical landmark by the NHCP.		Filipino	August 28, 1989	
Kataas-taasang Hukuman ng Pilipinas				Established by the Taft Commission in 1901.	Supreme Court of the Philippines Complex	Filipino	June 5, 2026	
Kolehiyo ng Medisina ng U.P.	U.P. College of Medicine			Established on December 1, 1905. Merged with the University of the Philippines and became the College of Medicine and Surgery on March 1, 1923.	Calderon Hall, UP Manila	Filipino	July 1, 1993	
Kombensiyong Konstitusyonal ng 1971	Constitutional Convention of 1971	Sites/events	Site of an important event	Started with the proposal to change the 1935 Constitution.	Manila Hotel	Filipino	June 1, 2021	
League of Women Voters of the Philippines, Inc. (LWVP)				Organization established to promote women participation in the government.	National Museum of Fine Arts, Taft Ave. cor. Padre Burgos St.	Filipino	July 15, 1987	
Leon Ma. Guerrero (1915–1962)				Diplomat, writer, nationalist. Wrote the distinguished Rizal biography.	Nuestra Señora de Guia Plaza	Filipino	June 24, 1953	
Leon Maria Guerrero (1853–1935)		Site	Site	First Filipino botanist and pharmaceutic. Served as the secretary of agriculture, industry and commerce of Emilio Aguinaldo.	Mehan Garden, Padre Burgos Avenue	Filipino	1982	
Luis Eligio Guerrero 1874 - 1950				Writer and doctor who treated many children against beri-beri, malaria, and chickenpox.	United Nations Ave.	Filipino	December 1, 1974	
Luneta Hotel				Designed by Salvador Farre, an example of French Renaissance architecture.	Luneta Hotel, T. M. Kalaw St.	Filipino	May 9, 2014	
Manila Metropolitan Theater		Building	Theater	Intended as the National Theater. Designed by architect Juan Arellano.	Metropolitan Theater	Filipino	1988	
Manuel Araullo y Gonzales (1853–1924)		Structure	Monument	Third Chief Justice of the Supreme Court. Adviser of General Elwell Otis	Araullo High School	Filipino	February 16, 2002	
Manuel Acuña Roxas (1892–1948)				Orator and statesman. President of the Philippines from 1946 to 1948.	Roxas Monument, Roxas Blvd.	Filipino	1989	
Manuel S. Guerrero (1877–1919)				Father of Beriberi studies for the infants in the Philippines. One of the founders of Gota de Leche.	Nuestra Señora de Guia Plaza	Filipino	January 8, 1984	
Mataas na Paaralang Araullo	Araullo High School			Established by the Americans as part of Manila High School on June 11, 1908.	Araullo High School, Taft Ave.	Filipino	February 13, 1992	
Manila Science High School				Began as a Special Science Class (SSC) of the Manila High School.	H. A. Bordner Building, Taft Avenue	Filipino	October 12, 2013	
Memorare				Memorial to Andrés Bonifacio, founder of the Katipunan who sought independence through revolution.	Bonifacio Shrine	Filipino	1997	
Military Hospital of Manila Sternberg Hospital				Formerly located near the Santa Clara Convent. Utilized under the Spanish and American regimes.		English	American era	
The Most Worshipful Grand Lodge of Free and Accepted Masons of the Philippines		Organization		Established December 12, 1912. Dr. Harry Eugene Stafford was first Grand Master.	F. Benitez St.	Filipino, English	December 12, 2012	
National Federation of Women's Club in the Philippines				Established on February 5, 1921. More than 300 women's clubs all around the Philippines gathered for the occasion.	Manila Hotel	Filipino	June 19, 2002	
National Historical Institute		Building	Government office	Established as Historical Research and Markers Committee on October 23, 1993.	NHCP Building, T.M. Kalaw St.	Filipino	December 30, 1995	
Old Legislative Building				First built as a library in 1918. Constructed under the designs of Ralph Harrington Doane and Antonio Toledo.	National Museum, P. Burgos Ave.	Filipino	2010	
Pamantasang Teknolohikal ng Pilipinas	Technological University of the Philippines			Established as Manila trade school on January 21, 1901. First formally opened in Intramuros in September 1901.	Technological University of the Philippines	Filipino	December 3, 2001	
Pambansang Aklatan ng Pilipinas	National Library of the Philippines	Association/ institution/ organization	Institutional marker	Had its origins from the Royal Decree of Queen Maria Cristina of Spain, August 12, 1887. First opened in Calle Gunao, Quiapo.	National Library of the Philippines	Filipino	August 11, 2022	
Ang Pambansang Bantayog ni Jose Rizal; 1913	José Rizal National Monument 1913			The national monument of Rizal designed by Richard Kissling.	In front of Rizal Monument, Rizal Park	Filipino, English	December 30, 2013	
Ang Pambansang Museo	The National Museum	Building	Government center, museum	Institution established on October 29, 1901, as Insular Museum of Ethnology, Natural History, and Commerce.	National Museum (Old Legislative Building)	Filipino	October 29, 2001	
Pambansang Museo ng Pilipinas	National Museum of the Philippines			The spirit of a national museum started with a decree by Queen Maria Cristina.	Sentinel of Freedom Monument, Ma. Orosa St., Rizal Park	Filipino	May 18, 2025	
Philippine General Hospital		Building	Hospital	Chief government hospital of the Philippines. Established in 1907.	Philippine General Hospital main building, Taft Avenue	Filipino	September 1, 1992	
Philippine Normal College				Opened on September 1, 1901, in Escuela Municipal, Intramuros. Moved to its current location in 1912.	Philippine Normal University, Taft Avenue	English	1952	
Philippine Normal University (1901 - 2001)				Established January 21, 1901, as Philippine Normal School. Moved to its current location in 1912.	Philippine Normal University, Taft Avenue	Filipino	September 1, 2001	
Philippine National Red Cross				Organized as a branch of American Red Cross on August 30, 1905.	Taft Ave. cor. U.N. Avenue	English	1955	
Philippine Post Office		Building	Post office	Primary postal service building of the Philippines. Established as Manila Post Office in 1767.	Manila Post Office Building, Liwasang Bonifacio	Filipino	June 2, 1994	
Philippine School of Arts and Trades				Established in 1901. Moved to present site in 1916. Destroyed during WWII and rehabilitated in 1951.	PSAT site, Ayala Ave.	English	1952	
Plaza Olivia Salamanca		Site	Plaza	In memory of Olivia Salamanca, M.D., pioneer woman physician of the Philippines	Taft Ave. cor. United Nations Ave.	English	1955	
Punong Himpilan ng Hukbong Pampulisya ng Maynila	Main Headquarters of Manila Police Force			Established as the first Manila civil police in 1901 under the proclamation of Governor William H. Taft.	Manila Police Department, United Nations Ave.	Filipino	August 7, 2017	
Pook na Pinagbarilan kay Rizal	Rizal's Execution Site	Site	Site	Where Rizal was executed for his alleged treason against Spain.	Rizal Park	Filipino, English	December 20, 1996	
Rafael Palma				Writer, educator, scholar, statesman, and senator. Delegate of Cavite during the First Philippine Assembly.	Department of Justice, Padre Faura	Filipino	October 24, 1974	
Rizal Fountain		Structure	Fountain	Fountain used by Rizal while in Wilhemsfeld, Germany, where in 1886, finished the last chapters of Noli Me Tángere.	Rizal Park	Filipino	December 30, 2011	
Rotary Club of Manila				First club in the Philippines and Asia, established by Leon Lambert and four other Americans, 1919.	Manila Hotel	Filipino	January 28, 1994	
Samahang Pang-hukbong Katihan at Pandagat ng Maynila (Army and Navy Club Building)		Building	Clubhouse	Established in 1898. Moved from its former site in Intramuros in 1911 under the plans of Daniel Burnham.	South Boulevard	English	January 6, 1979; June 29, 1992	
Sa mga Bayani ng Lungsod ng Maynila	To the Heroes of the City of Manila			Remembrance memorial to the heroes of Manila during the Second World War.	In front of Manila City Hall	Filipino	February 3, 1993	
Santa Isabel College				Founded in 1594 by the Hermandad de la Misericordia mainly for orphaned Spanish girls.	Santa Isabel College, Taft Avenue	English	September 14, 1947	
Simbahan at Kumbento ng San Juan Bautista de Bagumbayan	Church and Convent of San Juan Bautista de Bagumbayan	Site	Site	First church and convent of the Augustinian Recollects in the Philippines.	Rizal Park	English	December 7, 2006	
Ang Simbahan ng Nuestra Señora de Guia	Nuestra Señora de Guia Church	Building	House of worship	Built in 1606. Nuestra Señora de Guia was crowned by Cardinal Rufino Santos on May 16, 1971, with the golden crown from Pope Paul VI.	Ermita Church, Del Pilar St.	Filipino	May 19, 1971	
Sinupang Pambansa	National Archives	Association / institution / organization	Government office	Archival institution was established on October 21, 1901.	West Wing, National Library Bldg., T.M. Kalaw, Ave.	Filipino	May 25, 1971	
Site of the Former Colegio de San Pedro Martir				Church and convent of the Parian. Built by the Dominicans in 1588,		English	American era	
Site of the Inauguration of the Commonwealth of the Philippines				Where Manuel Quezon was Inaugurated as first president of the Commonwealth.	National Museum, P. Burgos Ave.	English	American era	
Technological University of the Philippines		Building	School	Established as Manila Trade School.	Technological University of the Philippines	Filipino	December 3, 2001	
Trece Martires de Bagumbayan	Thirteen Martyrs of Bagumbayan			Thirteen patriots were martyred by the Spanish on January 11, 1897.	Japanese Garden, Rizal Park	English	1999	
Trinidad F. Legarda (1899–1998)				First female ambassador of the Philippines. Campaigned for women suffrage in 1937.	NFWC Building, 962 J. Escoda Street cor. San Marcelino Street	Filipino	2003	
Unang Konsulado Heneral ng Australia sa Pilipinas	First Consul General of Australia in the Philippines			Established on May 22, 1946, on the first floor of the Manila Hotel.	Heritage Museum, Manila Hotel	Filipino	May 22, 2017	
Ang Unang Punong Himpilan ng Panlungsod na Hubong Pampulisya ng Maynila	The First Main Headquarters of the City Police Force of Manila			Established on January 9, 1901. Evolved into the Western Police District.	Western Polive District, U.N. Ave.	Filipino	January 6, 2001	
Union Theological Seminary				Oldest Protestant seminary in the Philippines. Was a merger of Presbyterian and Methodists schools.	Philippine Christian University, Taft. Ave.	Filipino	2007	
United Nations Plaza				Dedicated by the City of Manila to the United Nations. On International Day July 10, 1951, the UN flag was raised here.	U.N. Avenue	English	1951	
"Where Marcos Was Confined"				The room where President Ferdinand Marcos was confined for the illness contracted during his WWII army service (most probably a hoax)	Ward 8, Philippine General Hospital, Taft Ave.	Filipino	1966	
Young Men's Christian Association				Organized in 1910, helped in promoting athletic interest in the Philippines.	YMCA Building, Arroceros St.	English	1961	

=== Intramuros ===
This table lists 86 markers from the Intramuros district.

Marker title	Description	Location	Language	Date issued	Image
(untitled)	Manila Cathedral destroyed during WWII.	Manila Cathedral site ruins (current marker whereabouts unknown)	English	1949	
(untitled)	Santo Domingo Church destroyed during WWII.	Santo Domingo Church site ruins (current marker whereabouts unknown)	English	1949	
(untitled)	In honor of Charles IV for the benefit of vaccine.	Plaza Roma (current marker whereabouts unknown)	Spanish	1955	
(untitled)	College of Manila built by the Jesuits in 1595. Became the Cuartel de España where Jose Rizal was tried on December 26, 1896.	University of the City of Manila, General Luna cor. Muralla Sts.	English	1968	
Ang Akwaryum (Note: The Aquarium)	Fortification-gateway of Puerta Real built in 1771, became city aquarium after entrance to Intramuros was altered in 1902.	Revellin de Puerta Real del Bagumbayan (Puerta Real Gardens), Gen. Luna St.	Filipino	April 23, 1968	
Aquarium	An aquarium was opened at Puerta Real; this part of the walls date back to 1771.	Revellin de Puerta Real del Bagumbayan (Puerta Real Gardens), Gen. Luna St. (current marker whereabouts unknown)	English	American era	
Araullo High School	Was a municipal school for girls from 1892 to 1899. Became Manila High School.	Araullo High School	English		
Archconfraternity of Nuestra Señora de Aranzazu	Archconfraternity of Nuestra Señora de Aranzazu established in the College of San Juan de Letran.	Colegio de San Juan de Letran	English	1939	
Ateneo de Manila	Formerly Escuela Pia, founded by the Jesuits in 1859. Became Ateneo Municipal de Manila in 1865.	(currently within NHCP storage) original location: Ateneo de Manila, Arzobispo St.	English	1935	
At the Corner of Gen. Luna and Victoria	Was occupied by three Jesuit institutions: Real y Pontifica Universidad de San Ignacio, Colegio de San Jose, and Real Colegio de San Felipe.	Cor. Gen. Luna and Victoria (current marker whereabouts unknown)	English		
Ayuntamiento	Old City Hall of Manila, became building for the Asamblea de Filipinas and Supreme Court.	Ayuntamiento de Manila façade	Filipino	November 15, 2021	
Bantayog ng Gomburza (Note: Gomburza Monument)	Proclaimed as a National Monument on the sesquicentennial of the Gomburza execution.	Gomburza Monument, Padre Burgos Avenue	Filipino	January 21, 2021	
Bastion San Andres or San Nicolas	Protected the city from invasions from the Chinese and other powers.		English	American era	
Bastion San Diego	Completed in 1644. The British captured Manila in 1762 by capturing this bastion.		English	American era	
Bastion San Francisco	Named due to the proximity of the Franciscan Monastery and Church of San Francisco.		English	American era	
Bastion San Gabriel	One of the bastions of Intramuros that faced the San Gabriel hospital across the Pasig River.		English	1937	
Beaterio	Founded by Ignacia del Espíritu Santo. Canonically approved by the Holy See on March 24, 1931.		English	American era	
Benigno S. Aquino, Jr. "Ninoy" (1932–1983)	Tarlac governor who became senator. A political opponent of Ferdinand Marcos.	Ninoy Aquino Monument, Padre Burgos Ave.	Filipino	2002	
Boy's Singing School	Founded by the archbishop of Manila in 1742. Soprano voices were trained here.		English	American era	
Casas Consistoriales (Ayuntamiento) (Note: Town Hall Building)	The Old City Hall of Manila. First constructed from 1735 to 1738.	Bureau of Treasury (Ayuntamiento), Plaza Roma, Cabildo St.	Filipino	September 1989	
The Chamber of Commerce of the Philippine Islands	Established on April 19, 1886, to improve commerce, industry, and trade in the country.	Chamber of Commerce of the Philippines Foundation, Inc., Magallanes Dr.	Filipino, Spanish, English	November 20, 2014	
Ang Chamber of Commerce of the Philippines Foundation, Inc. (Note: The Chamber of Commerce of the Philippines Foundation, Inc.)	Established on April 19, 1886, to improve commerce, industry, and trade in the country.	Chamber of Commerce of the Philippines Foundation, Inc., Magallanes Dr.	Filipino	November 15, 2003	
Church of Recoletos	First erected in 1608 by the Recollects through the generosity of Bernadino del Castillo Maldonado. A church was reconstructed in 1780.	Recolect Church (destroyed during WWII, now inexistent)	English	American era	
Church of San Agustin	Oldest stone church built in the Philippines. Terms for the American Occupation were signed at the vestry in August 1898.	San Agustin Church	English	1934	
Church of San Agustin	Oldest stone church built in the Philippines. Completed in 1607.	San Agustin Church	English	1998	
Church of Sto. Domingo	First chapel inaugurated on January 1, 1588. Home of the Nuestra Señora del Rosario.	Old Sto. Domingo Church site	English	1935	
Church of the Third Order of the Franciscans	Founded about 1611 by the Third Order of Saint Francis. First chapel built in 1618.	Third Order of the Franciscans Church (destroyed during WWII, now inexistent)	English	1935	
College of San Juan de Letran	School founded in 1630 by Diego de Santamaria, O.P. Moved from its site in Parian in 1648.	Colegio de San Juan de Letran,151 Muralla St.	English	1941	
Colegio de Santa Rosa (Note: Santa Rosa College)	Established in 1750 by Mother Paula de la Santisima Trinidad as Beaterio y Casa de Enseñanza.	Colegio de Santa Rosa	Filipino	August 25, 1979	
Cuartel de Santa Lucia (Santa Lucia Barracks)	Built under Governor General Jose Basco y Vargas, this gate became the barracks for the Philippine Constabulary.	Santa Lucia St.	Filipino	August 4, 1990	
Dambana ng Kalayaan (Note: Shrine of Freedom)	In memory of Rizal and those who fought for the independence of the country.	Fort Santiago	Filipino	December 30, 1972; reunveiled June 23, 2026	
Dambanang Rizal sa Fort Santiago (Note: Rizal Shrine in Fort Santiago)	Fort where José Rizal was imprisoned before his execution in Luneta, became a shrine for Rizal.	Rizal Shrine, Fort Santiago	Filipino	2013	
Daughters of Charity in the Philippines	Social and religious mission established by the Vincentians under the command of Queen Isabela II.	CBCP Headquarters, Gen. Luna St.	Filipino	July 22, 1987	
El Parian	Former site of the Chinese suburb. Finally destroyed in 1860.	Padre Burgos St.	English	1949	
Escuadron Aerea de Pelea 201 (Aguilas Aztecas) (Note: 201st Fighter Squadron (Aztec Eagles))	Only Mexican force that fought outside Mexico during World War II.	201st Fighter Squadron monument, Intramuros Golf Course	Filipino	October 8, 2021	
Father Burgos Residence	Where Father Burgos lived in 1872, the parish priest of Parroquia de San Pedro.	Cabildo St.	English		
Fernanda Balboa; 1902–1999	Civic leader and the one behind the law creating Women's and Minor's Bureau.	Department of Labor and Employment Building, Muralla St.	Filipino	October 8, 2002	
Former Military Chapel	Chapel where the Gomburza were detained before their execution.	Luneta Police Station, now Luneta Japanese Garden (current marker whereabouts unknown)	English	1938	
Former Site of San Juan de Letran College			English	American era	
Fort Santiago	Foremost fort in the Intramuros built in place of the wooden palisade of Raja Matanda.	Sta. Clara St.	English	1934	
Former Palace of the Governors General	Residence of the governor-general of the Philippines. Residence of the Philippine chief executive moved to Malacañang after the 1863 earthquake.	Plaza Roma	Filipino	1936	
Franciscan Church	First chapel constructed of nipa and bamboo in 1577. Damaged in 1824.	San Francisco Church (destroyed during WWII, now inexistent)	English	1935	
In Memory of the Victims at Fort Santiago	Monument to the victims of Japanese violence inside the Fort in World War II.	Fort Santiago	English	1995	
Intendencia Building	Construction was authorized on April 3, 1823. Present building designed by Luis Cespedes and built by Luis Perez Sionjue from 1874 to 1876.	Former building of the Central Bank of the Philippines, Aduana St.	English	June 26, 1935	
Jesuit Church of San Ignacio	Designed by architect Felix Roxas. Woodwork done by Isabelo Tampinco.	Jesuit/San Ignacio Church (now being reconstructed), Arzobispo St.	English	American era	
Jose Felipe del Pan (1821–1891)	Colonial officer who served as guides of writers such as Isabelo delos Reyes and Mariano Ponce.	Palacio del Gobernador façade	Filipino	November 15, 2021	
Jose P. Laurel (1891–1959)	Jurist and statesman. President of the Second Philippine Republic.	Lyceum of the Philippines University, Muralla St.	Filipino	1991	
Juan Luna y Novicio (1857–1899)	Revolutionary painter, patriot and diplomat. Famous for the Spoliarium.	Juan Luna Monument, Gen. Luna St.	Filipino, English	December 14, 1985	
Knights of Columbus Manila Council No. 1000	Established in 1905. Organized multiple chapters outside Manila in the 1920s.	Knights of Columbus Building, Gen. Luna St.	Filipino	June 4, 2013	
Madre Ignacia del Espiritu Santo (Note: Mother Ignacia del Espiritu Santo)	Founder of the Religious of the Virgin Mary. Founder of the first movement for the religious training of women in the world.	Bagumbayan Light and Sound Museum, Victoria St.	Filipino	March 4, 1980	
Manila Bulletin	One of the oldest publications in the Philippines, established on February 2, 1900; was known for reporting corruption issues among agencies in the '30s.	Manila Bulletin Building, Recoletos St.	Filipino	October 23, 2025	
Manila High School	Established by the Spanish in 1892. Became the first school established by the Americans during their occupation.	Victoria St. cor. Muralla St.	Filipino	February 26, 1982	
The Manila Times	First daily newspaper in English.	Soriano Avenue	Filipino	October 11, 2023	
Memorare - Manila 1945	Dedicated to more than 100,000 civilians who were killed in the Liberation of Manila.	Gen. Luna St.	English	1996	
Memorare; Mga Tomasino na Lumagda sa Saligang Batas ng Pilipinas ng 1899 (Note: Memorare: The Thomasians who Signed the Philippine Constitution of 1899)	Dedicated to the Thomasians who signed the constitution of the first republic in Asia.	Plaza Santo Tomás	Filipino	January 25, 2002	
Mint	Former place where the Philippine currency was minted.	Aduana	English	American era	
National Press Club	Established in 1952. Angel Nakpil designed the building in 1955.	National Press Club Building, Magallanes Dr.	Filipino	May 3, 2006	
Padre Jose A. Burgos (Note: Father Jose A. Burgos)	Where Father Burgos lived from 1865 to 1872. He worked for reforms for the Catholic Church in the Philippines.	Cabildo St.	Filipino	1984	
Pag-aaklas ng Rehimyento ng Tayabas (Note: Mutiny of the Tayabas Regiment)	Mutiny of the Tayabas regiment under Sergeant Samaniego at Fort Santiago to give justice for the unjust execution of the Spaniards to Apolinario de la Cruz and other members of Confradia de San Jose.	Rizal Shrine, Fort Santiago	Filipino	January 19, 2018	
Ang Pagpapalaya ng Maynila (Note: The Liberation of Manila)	For the liberation of Manila under the joint Filipino and American troops.	COMELEC Annex, Araullo Bldg., Postigo St.	Filipino	February 3, 1989	
Parian Gate	Gate between Inramuros and the Parian. Named officially in 1782.	Muralla St.	English	American era	
Philippine Law School	Founded by Mariano P. Jhocson in 1915. Became the College of Law of National University in 1921.	Philippine Law School Bldg.	English	December 1, 1998	
Philippine Merchant Marine Academy	Within the old building of Consulado de Comercio. Established by a royal decree by Ferdinand VII on January 1, 1820.	Pavilion de La Castellana, Beaterio corner Cabildo Streets	Filipino	December 3, 2020	
Pintong Isabela II (Note: Isabela II Gate)	The gate of Intramuros facing the Pasig River. Named after Queen Isabella II.	Magallanes Dr.	Filipino	December 8, 1968	
Pintong Postigo (Note: Posterior Gate)	The third gate of Intramuros facing Manila Bay, located near the governor-general palace.	Postigo cor. Arzobispo Sts.	Filipino	December 8, 1968	
Pintong Real (Note: Royal Gate)	The second gate of Intramuros facing south. Rebuilt in 1968 after WWII.	Muralla St.	Filipino	December 8, 1968	
Pintong Sta. Lucia (Note: Sta. Lucia Gate)	The second gate of Intramuros facing Manila Bay. Was constructed again in 1781.	Bonifacio Dr.	Filipino	December 8, 1968	
Plaza McKinley	Renamed in 1901 after William McKinley, the U.S. president during the start of the American occupation of 1898.	Plaza Roma	English	1934	
Ang Pook na Kinatatayuan ng Unang Seminaryong Diyosesano ng Pilipinas (Note: The Site of the First Diocesan Seminary in the Philippines)	The first diocesan seminary in the Philippines, established under the decree of Philip V dated April 28, 1702.	Plaza Willard, Arzobispo St.	Filipino	September 23, 2000	
Pook na Pinaglibingan kay Madre Francisca del Espiritu Santo (Note: Burial Site of Mother Francisca del Espiritu Santo)	Where Francisca del Espiritu Santo was buried on August 24, 1711.	Colegio de San Juan de Letran	Filipino	August 24, 2000	
Powder Magazine	Placed by Field Marshall Fernándo Valdés y Tamon, former governor general of the Philippines		English	American era	
Prison Cell of Jose Rizal	Prison cell where Rizal was detained as prisoner from November 3 to December 29.	Rizal Shrine, Fort Santiago	English	1959	
Puerta Real - Royal Gateway	Through this gate, Spanish governors and archbishops made their official entry into the city.	Puerta Real	English	American era	
Puerto Postigo (Note: Postern Gate)	Smallest of the seven gates of Intramuros by 1898.	Puerta de Postigo	English	January 27, 1937	
Rizal's Cell	Where Rizal was confined for 24 hours before he was executed.		English		
Roman Catholic Cathedral of Manila	The main building for the Archdiocese of Manila. First cathedral built in 1581.	Manila Cathedral	English	1934	
Roman Catholic Cathedral of Manila	The main building for the Archdiocese of Manila. First cathedral built in 1581.	Manila Cathedral	English	1958	
Santa Clara Convent	Church built in 1622. Founded on April 28, 1620, by Geronima de la Asuncion who came from Toledo, Spain.		English	1936	
Santa Potenciana College	Former site of the college founded in 1591. Destroyed in 1762 because of the British invasion.		English	American era	
Santa Rosa Beaterio and College for Girls	Founded about 1750 by the Dominican Tertiary Paula de la Santisima Trinidad.		English	American era	
Santisimo Rosario College	Founded by the Rev. Vicente Istegui, O.P. in 1890 for the education of girls.		English	American era	
Simbahan at Kumbento ng Recoletos (Note: Church and Convent of the Recollects)	Place where the church and convent of the Recollects were built	Recoletos cor. Muralla Sts.	Filipino	December 7, 2006	
Site of the Former Church of San Juan de Dios	Hospitalarios de San Juan de Dios took over the Hospital de la Misericordia on March 31, 1656.		English		
Tenaza Real Santiago (Note: Royal Pincers of Santiago)	Designed and constructed between 1662 and 1671. Built fortifications as anticipations of the attacks of Kuesing.		English	American era	
Tomas Mapua (1888–1965)	Educator and first registered Filipino architect. Established Mapúa Institute of Technology.	Mapúa University	Filipino, English	December 21, 1989	
Unibersidad ng Santo Tomas (Note: University of Santo Tomas)	Foundation place of the University of Santo Tomas. Established on April 28, 1611.	Solana St.	Filipino	January 25, 2002	
University of Santo Tomas	Founded in 1611 by the legacy of Archbishop Miguel de Benavides.	Old UST entrance site, Postigo St.	English	1934	

=== Malate ===
This table lists 30 markers from the Malate district.

Marker title	Description	Location	Language	Date issued	Image
(untitled)	Scottish Rite Freemasonry building used as a torture center for the Japanese during WWII.	Scottish Rite Freemasonry, Taft Avenue	English	1995	
The Aristocrat	Famous historical restaurant, which started as an old food cart by Engracia Cruz-Reyes.	The Aristocrat, Roxas Blvd.	Filipino	2013	
Asilo de San Vicente de Paul (Note: San Vicente de Paul Asylum)	Institution inaugurated July 26, 1885. Became famous for its design and excellence on embroidery and needlework.	Asilo de San Vicente de Paul, U.N. Avenue	English	1935	
Chapel of the Crucified Christ; St. Paul University Manila	Church built according to the designs of architect Andres Luna de San Pedro.	St. Paul University, Pedro Gil St.	Filipino	November 23, 2007	
Church of Malate	City section as far back as 1588. Home of the Nuestra Señora de los Remedios.	Malate Church, M.H. del Pilar St.	English	1937	
Concepcion Felix Rodriguez (1884–1967)	Women's rights activist. Born in Tondo, Manila on February 9, 1884.	CWL Building, Escoda St.	Filipino	February 9, 1981	
De La Salle University - Manila	Established in 1911 under the De La Salle Brothers in Calle Nozaleda, Paco.	De La Salle University - Manila, Taft Ave.	Filipino	2012	
Ellinwood Malate Church	Presbyterian church built in Malate in 1907. Founding site of the United Church of Christ in the Philippines (UCCP).	1660 Dr. Antonio Vasquez St.	Filipino	2007	
Elpidio R. Quirino	President of the Republic of the Philippines from 1948 to 1956. Born in Vigan on November 16, 1890.	Quirino Ave. cor. Roxas Blvd.	Filipino, English	March 1, 1994	
Engracia Cruz Reyes (1892–1975)	Restaurant and Philippine cuisine pioneer and restaurant mogul.	Plaza Rajah Sulayman	Filipino	July 12, 1992	
Felipe Encarnacion Agoncillo at Marcela Mariño Agoncillo	Residence of the first Filipino diplomat and his wife who made the first Philippine flag	2020 M.H. del Pilar St.	Filipino	May 26, 1990	
Fort of San Antonio Abad	Fort with origins dating back to 1584. Became a British garrison in 1762.	BSP Grounds, Apolinario Mabini cor. Pablo Ocampo Sts.	English	1937	
Francisca Tirona Benitez	First president of the Philippine Women's University. Co-founder of Associacion de Damas Filipinas.	Philippine Women's University, Taft Ave.	Filipino	1987	
Heneral Vicente Lim (1888–1944) (Note: General Vicente Lim (1888–1944))	Co-founder of the Boy Scouts of the Philippines. Was executed by Japanese soldiers at Chinese Cemetery in 1944.	616, Vito Cruz	Filipino	March 20, 1995	
Honoria Acosta Sison	First Filipina doctor. Established and became first president of both the Asociacion de Damas de Filipinas and Philippine Obstetrical and Gynecological Society.	Taft Ave.	Filipino	December 20, 1988	
Josefa Jara Martinez (1894–1987)	Teacher and first social worker in the country. Authored The Evolution of Philippine Social Work.	Philippine Women's University, Taft Ave.	Filipino	October 10, 1994	
Jose P. Laurel (1891–1959)	President of the Second Philippine Republic from 1943 to 1945.	Laurel Monument, Roxas Blvd.	Filipino	2008	
Manila Yacht Club	Founded by James C. Rockwell, Joseph a Thomas, Abrey P. Ames, Stewart A. Taite, and A.S. Heyward in January 290, 1927.	Manila Yacht Club, Roxas Blvd.	Filipino, English	July 20, 2006	
Maria Orosa y Ylagan	Great chemist and food pharmaceutic. Served the secret organizations during WWII.	Bureau of Plant Industry	Filipino	November 29, 1983	
Masoneriyang Scottish Rite (Note: Scottish Rite Freemasonry)	Scottish Rite Freemasonry building in Manila. First organized in 1910.	Scottish Rite Freemasonry, Taft Ave.	Filipino, English	March 15, 1991, 1994 (English marker)	
Memorare	Dedicated to Spanish and Filipino sailors who died during the Battle of Manila Bay on May 1, 1898.	Philippine Navy Headquarters, Roxas Blvd.	English	February 12, 1998	
Memorare	Monument dedicated as memorial to the atrocities committed to comfort women during WWII.	Filipina Comfort Women Statue, Baywalk, Roxas Blvd.	Filipino	December 8, 2017; removed April 27, 2018	
Memorare	Dedicated to the La Sallian Brothers and other refugees who died as part of the Manila massacre during the Battle of Manila (1945) on February 12, 1945.	De La Salle University, Taft Ave.	Filipino	February 12, 2020	
Orosa Memorial Building	In memory of Maria Ylagan Orosa. Guerilla worker who died in line of duty on February 13, 1945.	Josefa Llanes Escoda St. (California St.)			
Pablo Ocampo (1853–1925)	Statesman, one of the secretaries of the Malolos Convention.	Pablo Ocampo (formerly Vito Cruz) cor. M. Adriatico Sts.	Filipino	June 11, 1991	
Arrival of the Pan Am China Clipper in the Philippines	Arrived in Manila Bay on November 29, 1935, became a way to establish flight communications between the Philippines and the United States.	Manila Yacht Club, Roxas Blvd.	Filipino, English	January 20, 2024	
The Philippine Women's University	Founded as Philippine Women's College, 1919. First university for home economics.	Philippine Women's University, Taft Ave.	English	1952	
Ramon Magsaysay (1907–1957)	President of the Philippines from 1953 to 1957.	Magsaysay Monument, Roxas Blvd.	Filipino and English	2007	
Severina Luna-Orosa	Writer, civic leader, and one of the first female doctors. Born on February 11, 1890, in Balayan, Batangas.	Luna Orosa Building, Remedios St. cor. Taft Ave.	Filipino	December 20, 1990	
St. Cecilia's Hall	Founded by Sister Baptista M. Battig, O.S.B. in 1907. Destroyed during the Liberation of Manila and rebuilt in 1955.	St. Scholastica's College	English	July 19, 1999	
St. Scholastica's College	Founded by the Benedictine Sisters of Tutzing, Germany. First established along Moriones St., Tondo on December 3, 1906.	St. Scholastica's College	Filipino	2007	

=== Paco ===
This table lists 15 markers from the Paco district.

Marker title	Description	Location	Language	Date issued	Image
(untitled)	Concordia College established by Margarita Roxas de Ayala in 1868.	Concordia College, Herran St. (now Pedro Gil St.)	English	1934	
Asociacion de Damas de Filipinas, Inc. Settlement House	Established on September 26, 1913. Honoria Acosta became the first president. Became a house for the orphaned.	1451, Pres. Quirino Ave.	Filipino	September 26, 1998	
Church of Dilao–Paco	First church built from 1599 to 1601. Present church was blessed on April 29, 1934.	Paco Church, Paz St.	English	1936	
Concordia College	Established by Margarita Roxas de Ayala in 1868. Where José Rizal met his sweethearts Segunda Katigbak and Leonor Rivera.	Concordia College, Herran St. (now Pedro Gil St.)	English	September 14, 1998	
Jose Rizal	Site of Rizal's original grave site, where his body was interred secretly.	Paco Cemetery	English	1957	
Looban College	The grounds were donated to the Sisters of Charity for the education of poor girls under Asunción Ventura. Inaugurated on July 26, 1885.	United Nations Ave.	English	1936	
Lord Justo Ukon Takayama (1552–1615)	Leader of the first group of Christianized Japanese who were banished to the Philippines in 1614.	Plaza Dilao	Filipino	November 17, 1992	
Manuel Acuña Roxas	Orator, statesman, economist, and nationalist. Born in Capiz, Capiz on January 1, 1892.	Manuel Roxas High School, Quirino Ave.	Filipino	June 21, 1989	
Memorare	Site of the grave of Gomburza (Frs. José Burgos, Mariano Gomez, and Jacinto Zamora).	Paco Park	English	February 17, 1998	
Paco Cemetery	Completed shortly previous to the cholera epidemic of 1820. Where José Rizal's remains were interred from 1898 to 1912.	Paco Park gate, Gen. Luna St.	English	1938	
Philippine Columbian Association	Organized in 1907. Intended to promote relations of Filipinos to foreign nationals.	Philippine Columbian Association, Quirino Ave. Extension	English	1960	
President Sergio Osmeña Highway	Name of South Superhighway changed to President Sergio Osmeña Highway through Republic Act No. 6760.	Quirino Avenue and South Superhighway (currently within NHCP storage)	Filipino	October 19, 1989	
Simbahan ng Birhen ng Peñafrancia (Note: Church of the Virgin of Peñafrancia)	First built of light materials in 1697, when Peñafrancia was a sitio of the old town of Dilao (Paco).	Peñafrancia de Paco Church side, Gomez St.	Filipino	July 4, 1979	
Simbahan ng San Fernando de Dilao ng Paco (Note: Church of San Fernando de Dilao of Paco)	First stone church built by Fray Juan de Garrovillas, OFM, from 1599 to 1601.	Paco Church, Paz St.	Filipino	August 22, 1999	
Tahanan ni Jose P. Laurel; Pangulo, Ikalawang Republika ng Pilipinas (1943–1945) (Note: House of Jose P. Laurel: President, Second Republic of the Philippines (1943–1945))	First built in 1864. Residence of Jose P. Laurel from 1926 to 1955.	Peñafrancia St. cor Sto. Sepulcro	Filipino, English	March 8, 1998	

=== Pandacan ===
This table lists seven markers from the Pandacan district.

Marker title	Description	Location	Language	Date issued	Image
(untitled)	Birthplace of Father Jacinto Zamora, born on August 14, 1835.	Zamora Plaza, Teodoro San Luis St.	Filipino	1954	
(untitled)	Formerly named Nagtahan, renamed as Mabini Bridge by Ferdinand Marcos on the 103rd birth anniversary of Apolinario Mabini.	Nagtahan Bridge site	Filipino	July 23, 1967	
Apolinario Mabini				September 17, 1997	
Church of Pandacan		Pandacan Church	English	American era	
Ladislao Bonus (1854–1908)	"Father of Philippine opera". Musical expert, composer, and music teacher.	Teodoro San Luis St.	Filipino	June 27, 1980	
Maria Paz Mendoza-Guazon (1884–1967)	Educator and doctor born in Pandacan, Manila on May 10, 1884.	Island Park, Pres. Quirino Ave.	Filipino	May 26, 1984	
Ang Simbahan ng Pandakan (Note: The Church of Pandacan)	Built in 1732 by Francisco del Rosario. Structure was finished in 1760.	Pandacan Church façade, Jesus St.	Filipino	July 13, 1976	

=== Port Area ===
This table lists five markers from the Port Area district.

Marker title	Description	Location	Language	Date issued	Image
Ang Base ng Patrulyang Pambaybayin (Note: The Base of the Offshore Patrol)	First built on February 9, 1939. Became the foundation of the Philippine Navy.	2nd St.	Filipino	February 9, 1976	
Order of the Knights of Rizal	Established in 1909 by Coronel Antonio C. Torres to venerate Rizal's execution and martyrdom.	Knights of Rizal Bldg., A. Bonifacio St.	Filipino	June 14, 1992	
Bureau of Customs	Established November 30, 1898. Reestablished on March 3, 1902.	Bureau of Customs Building	Filipino	February 6, 2002	
Bureau of Quarantine	Formerly the Bureau of Quarantine and International Health Surveillance.	Bureau of Quarantine Building	Filipino	June 14, 2007	
Claudio S. Teehankee; 1918–1989	Jurist and advocate of human rights, Supreme Commander of the Knights of Rizal.	Knights of Rizal Bldg., A. Bonifacio St.	Filipino	April 22, 2019	

=== Quiapo ===
This table lists 15 markers from the Quiapo district.

Marker title	Description	Location	Language	Date issued	Image
Aserradora Mecanica de Tuason y Sampedro (Note: Tuason and Sampedro Sawmill Mechanics)	First mechanical timber company in the Philippines, opened in 1880.	Globo de Oro cor. Gunao Sts. (currently within NHCP storage)	Spanish	1951	
Ang Bahay ng mga Nakpil at Bautista (Note: The House of the Nakpils and Bautistas)	Built by Ariston Bautista Lin. Ancestral house of the Nakpils and the Bautistas.	Nakpil-Bautista Ancestral House, 432 Ariston Bautista St.	Filipino	May 5, 1995	
Beaterio de Terciarias Agustinias Recoletas (Note: Tertiary Convent of Augustinian Recollects)	Dates from 1719. Became a teaching institution in June 1907.	Santa Rita College Convent, San Rafael St.	English	1939	
Church of Quiapo	Started as a Franciscan church built with bamboo and nipa. Famous for the Nazarene.	Quiapo Church, Plaza Miranda	English	1939	
Church of Quiapo		Quiapo Church		May 14, 1971	
"Can We Defend This In Plaza Miranda?"	President Ramon Magsaysay made Plaza Miranda the touchstone for public endorsement of policy and action.	Plaza Miranda	English	1965	
El Renacimiento (Note: The Renaissance)	American-era Filipino publication that was established by Martin Ocampo in 1901 and later sued for libel leading to its closure.	Gunao St.	Filipino	March 31, 1974	
Gregoria de Jesus (1875–1943)	Wife of Andrés Bonifacio and woman Katipunero leader. Kept the documents of the Katipunan.	Nakpil-Bautista Ancestral House, 432 Ariston Bautista St. (original location: Caloocan)	Filipino	May 9, 1975	
Gregoria de Jesus (1875–1943)	Wife of Andrés Bonifacio and woman Katipunero leader. Later married Julio Nakpil and gave birth to Juan Nakpil.	Nakpil–Bautista House, 432 Ariston Bautista St.	Filipino	May 9, 2026	
Gregorio Araneta y Soriano (1869–1930)	Jurist and statesman. Part of the committee that drafted the Malolos Constitution.	Nazarene Catholic School, R. Hidalgo St.	Filipino	1988	
Miguel Zaragoza y Aranquizna (1847–1923)	Painter, propagandist, one of the first teachers of University of the Philippines School of Fine Arts.	Nazarene Catholic School, R. Hidalgo St.	English	1939	
Plaza Miranda	Place of political protests and miting de avance, site of the 1971 bombing.	Plaza Miranda	Filipino	August 21, 2021	
San Sebastian Church	The only all-steel church in Asia. Earliest church, built in 1611.	San Sebastian Church	English	1934	
Simbahan ng San Sebastian (Note: Church of San Sebastian)	Declared as a national historical landmark by the NHCP.	San Sebastian Church	Filipino	January 29, 1977	
Simbahan ng United Church of Manila	Established as an ecumenical church in 1924.	United Church of Manila, 2006 C. M. Recto Avenue	Filipino	July 21, 2024	

=== Sampaloc ===
This table lists 25 markers from the Sampaloc district.

Marker title	Description	Location	Language	Date issued	Image
Bulwagang Paraninfo (Note: Paranymph Hall)	A short ceremony was held on December 16, 1941, where the class of 1942 and 1943 were sent to war. Class 1944 and 1945 became famous as guerrillas.	UST Main Building, España Ave.	Filipino	December 16, 1981	
Church of Sampaloc	Site donated by Franciscans in 1613. The first chapel was built in the same year.	Church of Our Lady of Loreto	English	1935	
Colegio Medico-Farmaceutico (Note: Doctor-Pharmacist College)	Initiated by Trinidad H. Pardo de Tavera and Mariano V. del Rosario on June 8, 1899.	Lepanto St. cor R. Papa	Spanish		
Colegio Medico-Farmaceutico de Filipinas, Inc. (CMFFI) (Note: Doctor-Pharmacist College of the Philippines)	Established by Trinidad H. Pardo de Tavera and Mariano V. Del Rosario.	Lepanto St. cor R. Papa (currently within NHCP storage)	Filipino		
Disyembre 8, 1964 (Note: December 8, 1964)	Isabelo de los Reyes established the first labor union in the Philippines on February 2, 1902.	Plaza Guipit, P. Guevarra St.	Filipino	1964	
First Shot in the Filipino-American War	Shot by Private William Grayson that sparked the Philippine–American War.	Sociego St. cor. Silencio St. (formerly located at San Juan Bridge)	English	1941	
Florentino P. Cayco (1892–1976)	President of National University from 1937 to 1941. Founded Arellano University in 1938.	Arellano University, Legarda St.	Filipino	October 15, 1992	
Jose Rizal (1861–1896)	Alumnus of the Royal and Pontifical University of Santo Tomas.	Arch of the Centuries, University of Santo Tomas, España Ave.	Spanish	1960	
La Gota de Leche (Note: The Milk Drop)	Project of La Protección de la Infacia, Inc. to distribute fresh cow's milk to the less fortunate.	859 Sergio H. Loyola St.	Filipino	2003	
La Proteccion de la Infancia, Inc.	Established by Teodoro R. Yangco to fight against the child disease in 1907.	859 Sergio H. Loyola St. (original location: Taft Ave.)	Filipino	October 17, 1977	
Litografia e Imprenta de Cacho Hermanos (Note: Cacho Brothers Lithography and Printing)	Founded by El Don Salvado Chofre. Printed lottery tickets and publications of the Spanish colonial administration.	Legarda	Spanish		
Manuel L. Quezon (1878–1944)	Alumnus of the Royal and Pontifical University of Santo Tomas.	Arch of the Centuries, University of Santo Tomas, España Ave.	Spanish	August 19, 1961	
National University	First private non-sectarian school in the Philippines. Founded in August 1900.	National University, Mariano F. Jhocson St.	English	1952	
Natividad Almeda Lopez (1892–1977)	Pioneer female lawyer and first female Filipina judge. Admitted to the Bar in 1914.	Gota de Leche, 859 Sergio H. Loyola St. (original location: Manila Children's Lying-in Hospital, Taft Ave., Ermita)	Filipino	September 8, 1992	
Paaralang Legarda (Note: Legarda School)	School established in 1922 that was used as station for Japanese soldiers in World War II.	Lealtad	Filipino	February 3, 1991	
Ang Pagsiklab ng Digmaan laban sa Estados Unidos (Note: The Spark of the War against the United States)	The first shot came from the side of 1st Nebraska Infantry Regiment.	Sociego St. cor. Silencio St.	Filipino	February 4, 2022	
Philippine Pharmaceutical Association	Established on August 29, 1920, at the Manila College of Pharmacy, Santa Cruz, Manila.	Philippine Pharmacists Association, R. Papa St.	Filipino	1996	
Roseville College	Founded in 1900. First private school exclusively for women supported and staffed by Filipinos.	España Ave.			
Santa Catalina College	First school for girls that was managed by and entrusted to religious women.	Santa Catalina College, Legarda St.	Filipino	February 18, 1988	
Santo Tomas Concentration Camp	Concentration camp for American and allied civilians during World War II.	España Ave.	English	September 2, 1947	
Ang Unang Limbagan sa Pilipinas (Note: The First Printing Press of the Philippines)	One of the oldest in the world. Published the Doctrina Christiana.	Miguel de Benavides Library, UST Campus, España Ave.	Filipino, Spanish	1943	
Unang Putok sa Digmaang Filipino-Amerikano (Note: First Shot in the Filipino-American War)	Shot by Private William Grayson that sparked the Philippine–American War.	Sociego St. cor. Silencio St. (formerly located at San Juan Bridge)	Filipino	February 4, 2004	
University of Manila	Established as Instituto de Manila on October 5, 1913. Became temporary city hall and senate hall in 1945.	University of Manila Noli Fili Building, Delos Santos St.	English	1952	
University of Santo Tomas	Founded in 1611 by the legacy of Archbishop Miguel de Benavides.	Main Building, University of Santo Tomas, España Ave.	English	1935	
University of Santo Tomas	Founded in 1611 by legacy of Archbishop Miguel de Benavides.	Benavides Monument, University of Santo Tomas, España Ave.	Filipino	January 25, 2012	

=== San Andres ===
There are no markers from the San Andres district.

=== San Miguel ===
This table lists 26 markers from the San Miguel district.

Marker title	Description	Location	Language	Date issued	Image
Abbey of Our Lady of Montserrat	Benedictine priorate turned into abbey. Erected in 1904. Raised to abbey in July 1924.	San Beda University, Mendiola St.	English	1939	
Carmen de Luna (1873–1962)	Founder of Centro Escolar University. Born on July 16, 1873.	Centro Escolar University, Mendiola St.	Filipino	July 16, 1973	
Centro Escolar University	Founded in 1907 as Centro Escolar de Señoritas by Librada Avelino and Carmen De Luna.	Centro Escolar University, Mendiola St.	English	1966	
Concepcion A. Aguila (1894–1959)	Distinguished teacher and law practitioner. Born on September 11, 1894.	Centro Escolar University, Mendiola St.	Filipino	December 16, 1994	
Fabrica de Cerveza de San Miguel (Note: San Miguel Beer Factory)	Founded by Don Enrique Maria Barreto de Ycaza on March 4, 1890, at Calzada de Malacañang (Laurel St.)	General Solano St.	Spanish	1950	
Generosa de Leon (1892–1962)	Great woman educator of the Centro Escolar University. Established CEU's College of Pharmacy.	Centro Escolar University, Mendiola St.	Filipino	December 9, 1992	
Goldenberg Mansion	Became the offices of the Philippine preliminary exposition to the International Esposition, St. Louis, Missouri.	838 General Solano St.	English	1957	
Hospicio de San Jose (Note: San Jose Hospice)	Founded in 1782 by Francisco Enrique Gomez and his wife, Barbara Verzosa.	Ayala Blvd.	English	October 17, 1939	
Hospicio de San Jose (1872) (Note: San Jose Hospice (1872))	Founded in 1782 by the Francisco couple in Pandacan. Moved to current location between 1835 and 1840.	Ayala Blvd.	Filipino	1977	
Ildefonso G. Tronqued, Sr.	Known athlete especially in football. Became part of the Philippine team who participated in the Far Eastern Games.	San Beda University, Mendiola St.	Filipino, English	June 23, 2006 (Tagalog); January 12, 2019 (English)	
Kalayaan Hall	Established in 1920 as the executive building by governor-general Francis Burton Harrison. Where the People Power Revolt ended on the night of February 25, 1986.	Kalayaan Hall, Malacañang Palace, J.P. Laurel St.	Filipino	2011	
Kalye Mendiola (Note: Mendiola Street)	Site of the Battle of Mendiola. Street known as the location for numerous mass protests.	Mendiola St.	Filipino	2012	
Kolehiyo ng San Beda (Note: San Beda College)	Established in 1901 by Spanish Benedictine Fathers as El Colegio de San Beda.	San Beda University, Mendiola St.	Filipino	July 22, 2001	
Komisyon sa Wikang Filipino (Note: Commission on the Filipino Language)	The government agency responsible for the development and preservation of Filipino and other Philippine languages.	Watson Building, J.P. Laurel St.	Filipino	2012	
La Consolacion College Manila	Started as an orphanage and school of Spanish Augustinian nuns.	La Consolacion College Manila, Mendiola St.	Filipino	September 4, 2002	
Liberation of Manila	Monument dedicated to the Allied liberation of Manila by combined U.S. and Philippine Commonwealth troops in World War II.	Plaza Aviles, S.P. Laurel St.	English	February 27, 1995	
Librada Avelino; 1873–1934	Co-founded Centro Escolar University. Born on January 18, 1873.	Centro Escolar University, Mendiola St.	Filipino	March 14, 1975	
Malacañan Palace	Current residence of the president of the Republic of the Philippines.	Malacañang Palace site	English	1941 (now lost)	
Palasyo ng Malakanyang (Note: Malacañang Palace)	Declared as a National Historical Landmark by the NHCP.	Malacañang Palace	Filipino, English	June 8, 1998	
Palasyo ng Malakanyang (Note: Malacañang Palace)	Bought by Colonel Miguel Jose Fomento from Luis Rocha in 1802. Designated as the summer house of the governor general in 1847.	Entrance lobby, Malacañang Palace	Filipino	2004	
Philippine Lawyers' Association	Established in Manila in 1945. Diosdado Macapagal served as first president.	Malacañang Palace	Filipino	August 11, 1995	
Sabino B. Padilla (1894–1986)	Became secretary of the Department of Justice in 1948. Became an associate justice of the Supreme Court.	785 Nicanor B. Padilla St.	Filipino	August 20, 1994	
San Beda College	Established in 1901 by the Benedictine Fathers on Arlegui Street.	San Beda University, Mendiola St.	English	1939	
San Beda College	Established in 1901 by Benedictine Fathers. Became affiliated with the University of Santo Tomas on January 27, 1906.	San Beda University, Mendiola St.	English	1948	
Sofia Reyes de Vera	Civic leader, became the second president of Centro Escolar University, from 1934 to 1953.	Centro Escolar University, Mendiola St.	Filipino	1976	
Simbahan ng San Miguel (Note: Church of San Miguel)	Stone church by the Jesuits built in 1903, became the central base for missions to Japan.	1000 Jose P. Laurel, Sr. St. corner Gen. Solano St.	Filipino	September 28, 2003	

=== San Nicolas ===
This table lists 11 markers from the San Nicolas district.

Marker title	Description	Location	Language	Date issued	Image
(untitled)	Founding of the Katipunan	Elcano St.		July 7, 1998	
Jose Abad Santos y Barce (1886–1942)	Statesman and fifth chief justice of the Philippines. Born on February 19, 1886.	Jose Abad Santos High School	Filipino	February 19, 1986	
K. K. Katipunan ng mga Anak ng Bayan (Note: The Highest and Most Honorable Society of the Children of the Nation)	Established by Andrés Bonifacio to wage an armed revolution against the Spaniards.	(currently within NHCP storage)	Filipino		
Kataastaasan Kagalanggalang na Katipunan ng mga Anak ng Bayan (K.K.K.N.M.A.N.B.) (Note: The Highest and Most Honorable Society of the Children of the Nation)	Foundation site of the Katipunan. Established on July 7, 1892.	72 Azcarraga St. (now Recto Ave.)	Filipino	2008	
Mababang Paaralang Pedro Guevara (Note: Pedro Guevara Elementary School)	Old site of the Acaiceria de San Fernando, the main market for Chinese silk.	San Fernando St.	Filipino	September 1. 1998	
Ang Parola ng Binondo (Note: The Binondo Lighthouse)	First built at the mouth of the Pasig River under Governor-General Sebastian Hurtado de Corcuera in 1642.	Pasig River Lighthouse	Filipino	November 12, 2002	
Pook na Kinamatayan ni Teodora Alonso (Note: Death Site of Teodora Alonzo)	Where Teodora Alonso, mother of José Rizal died, August 16, 1911.	San Fernando St.	Filipino	January 30, 2014	
Pook Kung Saan Itinatag ang Katipunan (Note: Site Where the Katipunan was Established)	Founded on July 7, 1892. Aimed independence from Spain through armed struggle.	Elcano St.	Filipino	July 7, 1998	
Sinilangang Pook ni Heneral Antonio Luna (Note: Birthplace of General Antonio Luna)	Writer and soldier. He was born in this house on October 29, 1866.	457 Urbiztondo St.	Filipino	October 29, 1967	
Ang Tahanan ng Kaanak ni Rizal; 1903 Daang San Fernando, Maynila (Note: House of Rizal's relatives: 1903 San Fernando Street, Manila)	Death place of Teodora Alonzo, mother of José Rizal. The house was owned by Luisa Lichauco.	San Fernando St.	Filipino	1960	
Where "Ang Kalayaan" Was Printed	Revolutionary underground publication against the Spaniards by the Katipunan.	Lavezares St.	English	1941	

=== Santa Ana ===
This table lists six markers from the Santa Ana district.

Marker title	Description	Location	Language	Date issued	Image
Church of Santa Ana	First Franciscan mission established outside Manila in 1578.	Santa Ana Church belltower	English	1936	
Felipe G. Calderon (1868–1908)	Pedagogue, lawyer, writer. Drafted the constitution of the First Philippine Republic.	Plaza Felipe Calderon	English	1954	
La Ignaciana	A Jesuit villa used for retreats by Ateneo de Manila, where the spiritual exercises of Saint Ignatius were given.	Herran St. (now Pedro Gil St.) (inexistent; as of 2013, marker lost)	English	1939	
Lichauco House	Declared as a heritage house by the NHCP.	Lichauco Heritage House, Herrán (Pedro Gil)	English	2010	
Thomas Earnshaw; 1867–1954	Became director and vice president of the Manila Railroad Company	Santa Ana Elementary School, Punta	Filipino	November 5, 1973	
Unang Bahay Sambahan ng Unang Lokal ng Iglesia Ni Cristo (Note: First Worship House of the First Locale of Iglesia Ni Cristo)	Built in 1937 in a fusion of neogothic and neoclassical styles	Iglesia ni Cristo Museum, Punta	Filipino	January 28, 2025	

=== Santa Cruz ===
This table lists 34 markers from the Santa Cruz district.

Marker title	Description	Location	Language	Date issued	Image
(untitled)	Site where the Asociacion Feminista Filipina was first organized on June 30, 1905.	Priscilla Bldg., 770 Rizal Ave.	Filipino	1955	
(untitled)	First burial site of Francisco Mercado and Teodora Alonso.	Manila North Cemetery	English	1961	
Amado Hernandez y Vera	Writer and leader of the workers. Received multiple awards and recognitions such as National Artist.	Second St., Manila North Cemetery	Filipino	September 20, 1994	
Ariston Bautista Lin; 1863–1928	Patriot, physician, and philanthropist. Born on February 23, 1863.		Filipino	February 22, 1981	
Ariston Bautista Lin; 1863–1928	Patriot, physician, and philanthropist. Born on February 23, 1863.	Ronquillo St.	Filipino	1983	
Bureau of Health	Began as the Board of Health for the city of Manila in 1898. Extended functions to the provinces in 1899.	San Lazaro Hospital Compound	English	1950	
Carriedo Fountain	Built in 1882 as part of the Carriedo Waterworks System. Initiated by Governor General Domingo Moriones.	Plaza Santa Cruz	Filipino	July 24, 1997	
Church of Santa Cruz	Church built and administered by the Jesuits until 1768. Houses Our Lady of the Pillar of Manila.	Plaza Santa Cruz	English	1937	
Dalawampu't Siyam na Martir (Note: Twenty-nine Martyrs)	Burial site of twenty-nine martyrs who were captured and beheaded by the Japanese during the occupation era.	38th cor. 16th streets, Manila North Cemetery	Filipino	April 11, 2022	
Dating Libingan ni Apolinario Mabini; 1903 (Note: Former Burial Site of Apolinario Mabini: 1903)	Original burial site of Apolinario Mabini when he died of cholera on May 13, 1903.	Chinese Cemetery	Filipino	1963	
Francis Burton Harrison; 1873–1957	Became New York representative, 1903–1913. American governor-general, 1913–1921.	Main Avenue, North Cemetery	Filipino	December 18, 2021	
Francisco V. Guilledo (1901–1925)	The Philippines' first champion boxer, also known as "Pancho Villa"	North Cemetery	Filipino	1995	
Gusaling Roman R. Santos (Note: Roman R. Santos Building)	Building was occupied by Monte de Piedad Savings Bank from 1894 to 1937.	Roman Santos Bldg., Escolta St.	Filipino	1977 (replacement of earlier marker due to loss)	
Hukbong Gerilya ng mga Tsino-Filipino Laban sa mga Hapon sa Pilipinas; Wha Chi (Note: Guerilla Force of Chinese-Filipinos against the Japanese in the Philippines: Wha Chi)	Group of Chinese who fled from Manila to Central Luzon as part of the Hukbalahap.	Anti-Japanese Memorial, Manila Chinese Cemetery	Filipino	2005	
Inauguration of the First Philippine Assembly	Site of the inauguration of the First Philippine Assembly on October 16, 1907.	Manila Opera Hotel, Doroteo Jose St.	English	1940	
In Memoriam - Thomasites	Burial site of the Thomasites, pioneer American school teachers.	Manila North Cemetery	Filipino	August 21, 1995	
Honorata De La Rama (1902–1991)	First Filipino to introduce kundiman overseas. National Artist for Theater and Music.	Second St. Manila North Cemetery	Filipino	September 20, 1994	
Jose F. Fabella; 1888–1945	Father of Philippine public health. Born on October 16, 1888.	Rizal Ave.	Filipino	December 2002	
Justiniano Asuncion (1816–1896)	Distinguished painter. Born on September 26, 1816, and became capitan municipal of Santa Cruz.	Santa Cruz Church side	Filipino	September 12, 1983	
Kagawaran ng Kalusugan (Note: Department of Health)	Established on September 29, 1898, as a health service for Manila.	Department of Health, Rizal Ave.	Filipino	September 28, 1994	
La Proteccion de la Infacia, Inc.	Built to suppress illnesses that were killing children at that time.	Jose Fabella Hospital	Filipino	October 17, 1977	
Leoncio Asuncion (1813–1888)	Father of modern religious sculpting. Born on September 12, 1813.	Santa Cruz Church side	Filipino	September 12, 1983	
The Manila College of Pharmacy	First school of pharmacy established and run by Filipinos. Precursor to the Manila Central University.	Manila Central University Compound, Fugoso St.	English	1954	
The Manila Grand Opera House	Site of the inauguration of the First Philippine Assembly. Site was burned on November 18, 1943.	Manila Grand Opera House parking area, Rizal Avenue	English	1948	
Manila Law College	Founded on February 27, 1899, as Escuela de Derecho de Manila by Felipe Calderon.		English		
Monte de Piedad and Savings Bank	Oldest savings bank in the Philippines. Inaugurated on August 2, 1882, by Felix Huertas.	Plaza Santa Cruz	English	1959	
Mauseleo de los Veteranos de la Revolucion (Note: Mausoleum of the Veterans of the Revolution)	Built in memory of the veterans of the 1896 Revolution and Philippine–American War.	North Cemetery	Filipino	June 12, 1993	
Nagkakaisang Metodistang Simbahang Knox (Knox United Methodist Church) (Itinatag 1899) (Note: Knox United Methodist Church (Established 1899))	Site of the first Methodist community in the Philippines, led by Bishop James W. Thoburn.	Knox United Methodist Church, Rizal Avenue	Filipino	October 28, 1979	
Obispo Maximo Isabelo de los Reyes, Anak (Note: Supreme Bishop Isabelo de los Reyes, Jr.)	Ordained and first celebrated mass at this site. Became supreme bishop of the Iglesia Filipina Independiente.	Iglesia Filipina Independiente Chapel, V. Concepcion St.	Filipino	October 8, 1972	
Philippine Tuberculosis Society	Founded on July 29, 1910.	Rizal Ave. cor Tayuman	English	Sept. 24, 1949	
San Lazaro Hospital	Founded by Fray Juan Clemente in Intramuros in 1577.	San Lazaro Hospital compound	English	1952	
Severino Reyes	Novelist and playwright. Born in Santa Cruz, Manila on February 11, 1861.	Severino Reyes, House, Severino Reyes St.	Filipino	September 1969	
Sixto Ylagan Orosa y Agoncillo (1891–1981)	Instituted 14 Red Cross emergency hospitals in Manila during WWII.	Department of Health, San Lazaro Hospital Compound Original location: TNL Building, Ermita	Filipino	December 12, 1991	
Victoria Lopez-Araneta	Founded the White Cross Orphanage and FEATI University.	FEATI University	Filipino	2007	

=== Santa Mesa ===
This table lists 7 markers from the Santa Mesa district.

Marker title	Description	Location	Language	Date issued	Image
(untitled)	In this house as in the hearts of the Filipino people is enshrined the memory of Apolinario Mabini.	Mabini Shrine, Polytechnic University of the Philippines (formerly located in Pandacan)	Filipino	1941	
(untitled)	House where Apolinario Mabini died on May 13, 1903	Mabini Shrine, Polytechnic University of the Philippines (formerly located in Pandacan)	English, Filipino	1953, 1971	
Apolinario Mabini; 23 Hulyo 1864 – 13 Mayo 1903 (Note: Apolinario Mabini: 23 July 1864 - 13 May 1903)	Revolutionary, writer, and political philosopher. The sublime paralytic of the Philippine Revolution.	Mabini Shrine, Polytechnic University of the Philippines	Filipino	July 23, 2013	
Dambanang Apolinario Mabini (Note: Apolinario Mabini Shrine)	Ancestral house of Apolinario Mabini, now a shrine dedicated to him.	Mabini Shrine, Polytechnic University of the Philippines	Filipino	July 23, 2013	
Dambana ni Mabini; Pandacan, Manila (Note: Shrine of Mabini: Pandacan, Manila)	Dedicated to the paralytic hero of the revolution, Apolinario Mabini.	Mabini Shrine, Polytechnic University of the Philippines (formerly located in Pandacan, currently within NHCP storage)	Filipino	Second week of February, 1971	
Eulogio “Amang” Rodriguez Institute of Science and Technology (EARIST)	Initially a vocational school in a land donated by Eulogio Rodriguez.	EARIST Main Building façade, Nagtahan St.	Filipino		
Polytechnic University of the Philippines (1904–2004)	Built as Manila Business School, established in Quiapo in October 1904.	Polytechnic University of the Philippines	Filipino	October 19, 2004	

=== Tondo ===
This table lists 21 markers from the Tondo district.

Marker title	Description	Location	Language	Date issued	Image
Amado Hernandez y Vera (1903–1970)	Writer and leader of the workers. Born on September 13, 1903.	Plaza Leon	Filipino	1982	
Andres Bonifacio; 1863–1897	Founded the Katipunan on July 7, 1892, aimed towards Philippine independence from Spain.	Bonifacio Monument, in front of Tutuban Train Station	Filipino	November 30, 1974	
Antonio Luna				October 29, 1997	
Church of Tondo	Popular among the Chinese, the present church was built in the second half of the 19th century,	600 L. Chacon St.	English	1939	
Domingo Franco y Tuason (1856–1897)	Propagandist, patriot, and martyr. Born on August 4, 1856.	Plaza Moriones	Filipino	August 4, 1992	
Emilio Jacinto	Birthplace of the "Brains of the Philippine Revolution." Joined the Katipunan in 1894.	San Jose de Trozo Parish, Masangkay St.	Filipino	December 10, 1975	
Honorio Lopez (1875–1958)	Playwright and revolutionary born in Santa Cruz, Manila. Born on December 30, 1875.	Plaza Moriones	Filipino	2010	
Honorio Lopez (1875–1958)	Playwright and revolutionary born in Santa Cruz, Manila. Born on December 30, 1875.	2875 Rizal Ave.	Filipino	September 2, 1991	
Iglesia Evangelica Metodista en las Islas Filipinas (IEMELIF) (Note: Evangelical Methodist Church in the Philippine Islands)	First local evangelical church in the Philippines. Established by Nicolás Zamora on February 28, 1909.	Iglesia Evangelica Metodista en las Islas Filipinas compound, cor Nicolas Zamora and Peñalosa Sts.	Filipino	February 28, 1984	
Jose Corazon De Jesus (1894–1932)	Born on November 22, 1984. Known as the "King of Balagtasan."	Jose Corazon de Jesus Elementary School, Nicanor Zamora St.	Filipino	November 22, 1994	
La Liga Filipina (Note: The Philippine League)	Established by José Rizal for the reform movement and the progress of the Philippines.	Ylaya St. (currently within NHCP storage)	Filipino	1992	
La Liga Filipina (Note: The Philippine League)	Established by José Rizal on this site to secure the rights of Filipinos. Reestablished by Domingo Franco, Andrés Bonifacio, and Apolinario Mabini.	Plaza Liga Filipina, Ylaya St. cor. Raja Matanda St.	Filipino	July 3, 2015	
Liga Filipina (Note: Philippine League)	House where Rizal established the society on July 3, 1892. Dissolved when Rizal was deported to Dapitan.	Recto Avenue	English		
Manila Railroad Company	Preparation of general plan for railroad on Luzon authorized by a royal decree issued June 26, 1875.	Tutuban Center, Claro M. Recto Ave.	Filipino	1934	
Mary Johnston Hospital	First used as a bible school for women. Established in 1906 by Dr. Rebecca Parish.	Mary Johnston Hospital, 1221 Juan Nolasco St.	Filipino	December 8, 2006	
Memorare	A Muslim armada composed of 2,000 fought here and opposed the Spaniards. Memory to the 450th anniversary of the Battle of Bangkusay.	Moriones	Filipino	June 3, 2021	
Ang Pampangulong Kotse ng Tren (Note: The Presidential Train Car)	Built by the Manila Railroad Company for the chief executive. First to use it was Quezon and last was Garcia.	PNR Tutuban Terminal	Filipino	July 31, 1984	
Rosa Sevilla de Alvero	Established Instituto de Mujeres, first secular school for girls	Manila Cathedral School, Tayuman	Filipino	March 4, 1979	
Rosuario Almario (1886–1993)	Known writer in Tagalog. Became a councilor of Manila from 1925 to 1928.	Kagitingan St.	Filipino	August 29, 1986	
Timoteo Paez (1861–1939)	Reformist and revolutionary born in Tondo, August 22, 1861.	Timoteo Paez Integrated Elementary School, Balut	Filipino	September 1, 2022	
Vicente L. Del Fierro (1903–1960)	Distinguished journalist. Known as "Del Fire," born on December 15, 1903.	Rotunda, Plaza Balagtas, Vicente L. del Fierro St., Gagalangin	Filipino	September 6, 1984	

== Marikina ==
This table lists four markers from the city of Marikina.

Marker title	Description	Location	Language	Date issued	Image
Kolehiyo-Seminaryo ng San Jose (Note: College-Seminary of San Jose)	First established by the Jesuits in Intramuros on August 25, 1801.	San Jose Seminary, Ateneo de Manila University (original location: Pamantasan ng Lungsod ng Maynila site, Intramuros)	Filipino	December 7, 2002	
Simbahan ng Nuestra Señora de Los Desamparados (Note: Church of Our Lady of the Abandoned)	First church built by Augustinians through the use of light materials.	Marikina Church façade, se P. Rizal St., Santa Elena	Filipino	May 13, 1990	
Unang Misa sa Baryo ng Jesus de la Peña (Note: First Mass in the Village of Jesus de la Peña)	First mass held in Marikina was held here on April 16, 1630. The chapel was established by Jesuits who discovered an image of Christ.	Jesus de la Peña Chapel façade, Capt. Sindo St.	Filipino	April 16, 1970	
Unang Pagawaan ng Sapatos sa Marikina (Note: First Shoe Workshop in Marikina)	Pioneers of the Marikina shoe industry since the last days of 1887.	Jose P. Rizal St., Santa Elena	Filipino	April 16, 1970	

== Muntinlupa ==
This table lists four markers from the city of Muntinlupa.

Marker title	Description	Location	Language	Date issued	Image
Bagong Bilangguang Bilibid (Kawanihan ng mga Bilangguan) (Note: New Bilibid Prison (Bureau of Prisons))	Relocated to this site on November 15, 1940, from its original site in Santa Cruz.	New Bilibid Prison	Filipino	March 1, 2000	
Ang Espedisyong Balmis (Note: The Balmis Expedition)	Spanish medical expedition to vaccinate the population against smallpox.	Balmis Building, Research Institute for Tropical Medicine, Filinvest City, Alabang	Filipino	April 15, 2004	
Kawanihan ng Koreksiyon (Note: Bureau of Corrections)	Established on November 1, 1905, as Bureau of Prisons under the Department of Public Instruction.	New Bilibid Prison	Filipino	November 8, 2005	
Insular Life	First insurance company established in the Philippines. Established on November 25, 1910.	Insular Life Corporate Centre, Insular Life Drive, Filinvest City, Alabang	Filipino	November 25, 2010	

== Navotas ==
This table lists two markers from the city of Navotas.

Marker title	Description	Location	Language	Date issued	Image
Simbahan ng Navotas (Note: Church of Navotas)	Established by the Augustinians as a visita of Tondo, May 21, 1599. Made into a prison of suspected guerillas during WWII.	Church of Navotas façade	Filipino	December 10, 2021	
United Methodist Church (Tangos, Navotas)	Established in 1900. Fifty worshipers were sent by Pastor Nicolás Zamora. First chapel built in 1905.	Mariano Naval cor. S. Antonio Sts., Tangos		May 5, 1985	

== Parañaque ==
This table lists six markers from the city of Parañaque.

Marker title	Description	Location	Language	Date issued	Image
Benigno S. Aquino Jr. “Ninoy” (1932–1983)		Ninoy Aquino Monument, Ninoy Ave.		February 12, 2015	
Church of Parañaque	Established by Spanish friars under Fr. Diego de Espinal, O.S.A.	Quirino Ave., La Huerta	English	1939	
Kapilya ni San Nicolas de Tolentino (Note: Chapel of Saint Nicholas of Tolentino)	First built by Augustinians in 1776 using bricks and stone. Used as a barracks by the Spanish forces during the Philippine Revolution.	Kapitan Tinoy St., La Huerta	Filipino	May 7, 1995	
Manuel Bernabe y Hernandez	Award-winning poet. Born on February 17, 1890. Journalist of La Democracia and La Vanguardia.	M.H. del Pilar St.	Filipino	November 29, 1983	
Padre Pedro Dandan y Masangkay (Note: Father Pedro Dandan y Masangkay)	Revolutionary secular priest who was part of the Cavite Mutiny.	Parañaque Church	Filipino	March 4, 1984	
Simbahang Metodistang Episkopal (Note: Methodist Episcopal Church)	First Methodist church south of Manila. Established in 1901 by American missionaries.	0199 Quirino Avenue, Tambo	Filipino	March 19, 1991	

== Pasay ==
This table lists 11 markers from the city of Pasay.

Marker title	Description	Location	Language	Date issued	Image
Avenida Mexico (Note: Mexico Avenue)	Important route for the Manila-Acapulco galleon trade for two hundred years until 1815.	Taft Ave. Extension (currently within NHCP storage)	Filipino	1964	
Ang Bahay ni Eulogio "Amang" Rodriguez (Note: The House of Eulogio "Amang" Rodriguez)	Old residence of the late Eulogio "Amang" Rodriguez. Built in 1951.	E. Rodriguez St. (formerly Salud St.) cor. Tangkian St.	Filipino	December 9, 1983	
Claro M. Recto	Patriot, statesman, jurist, parliamentarian, and writer. Spent his latter years on great deeds.	2150 F.B. Harrison	Filipino	October 2, 1986	
Eduardo A. Quisumbing (1895–1986)	Taxonomist and orchidologist. Born in Santa Cruz, Laguna, on November 25, 1895.	College Rd.	Filipino	November 24, 1986	
Manuel Colayco (1906–1945)	Born on May 29, 1906. Distinguished editor and religious leader. WWII hero.	Colayco Monument, Pasay Sports Complex (Derham Park)	English	May 29, 1984	
Marcela Marcelo-Lugo	Known as "Henerala." Headed a group in the Battle of Santol Pass, where she died on March 21, 1897.	Malibay Central Plaza			
Ospital ng San Juan de Dios (Note: Hospital of San Juan de Dios)	Established by Fray Juan Clemente in 1578 in Intramuros. Reopened in 1952 after WWII.	Roxas Blvd.	Filipino	August 15, 1979	
School for the Deaf and Blind (1907)	Pioneer school for the handicapped in the Philippines. Founded in 1923.	F.B. Harrison St.	English	1961	
Tumira Dito si Claro Mayo Recto (1890–1960) (Note: Here Lived Claro Mayo Recto (1890–1960))	Where Claro M. Recto spent his most meaningful years of his life.	Leveriza St. cor. Fresno St.	Filipino	1986	
Unang Paaralang Bayan ng Pasay (Note: First Public School of Pasay)	Oldest school in Pasay. Built in 1907. Renamed after Epifanio de los Santos in 1948.	P. Burgos St., Barangay 60	Filipino	1956	
Unang Paaralang Bayan ng Pasay (Note: First Public School of Pasay)	Declared by the NHCP as a National Historical Landmark.	P. Burgos St., Barangay 60	Filipino	1984	

== Pasig ==
This table lists seven markers from the city of Pasig.

Marker title	Description	Location	Language	Date issued	Image
Church of Pasig	First church built in 1575. Occupied and used by British during their occupation.	Pasig Cathedral façade, Plaza Rizal, Malinao	English	1937	
Colegio de Madres Agustinas (Note: College of the Augustinian Nuns)	College founded in 1740 by Rev. Felix Trillo O.S.A. Intended for the education of girls.	Antonio Luna St.	English	1937	
Colegio del Buen Consejo (Note: College of Good Counsel)	Built upon the structure of the Santa Rita de Pasig convent. Renovated in 1948 after getting destroyed during the Liberation of Manila.	Antonio Luna St., Plaza Rizal, Malinao	Filipino	2009	
Dakilang Pulong ng Katipunan sa Pasig "Asamblea Magna" (Note: Great Meeting of the Katipunan in Pasig)	Andrés Bonifacio gathered Katipuneros in the house of Valentin Cruz to plan the revolution against the Spaniards.	20 M.H. del Pilar St, Pasig	Filipino	August 29, 2023	
Eugenio López (1901–1975)	Entrepreneur and philanthropist. Founder of ABS-CBN Corporation.	Benpres Building, Exchange Road corner Meralco Ave., San Antonio	Filipino	1989	
Julia Vargas Vda. de Ortigas (Note: Julia Vargas Widow of Ortigas)	Great civic leader and philanthropist. Became president of Philippine Tuberculosis Society.	Emerald Ave., Ortigas Center	Filipino	April 27, 1982	
Pang-alaalang Bantayog (Note: Memorial Monument)	Dedicated to the heroes of Pasig who died during World War II.	Caruncho Ave., Malinao (formerly located at Plaza Rizal)	Filipino	August 29, 1954	

== Pateros ==
This table lists one marker from the municipality of Pateros.

Marker title	Description	Location	Language	Date issued	Image
Simbahan ng Pateros (Note: Church of Pateros)	Founded by the Augustinians as a visita of Pasig in 1572. Became a visita of Taguig in 1742.	Pateros Church façade, B. Morcilla St.	Filipino	August 15, 2015	

== Quezon City ==
This table lists 48 markers from Quezon City.

Marker title	Description	Location	Language	Date issued	Image
(untitled)	New location of the monument commemorating the Cry of Pugad Lawin.	Katipunero Monument, Vinzons Hall, Academic Oval, University of the Philippines Diliman	Filipino	November 29, 1968	
Armed Forces of the Philippines Medical Service	Created by Emilio Aguinaldo as division of military health on June 23, 1898. Gen. Anastacio Francisco served as first head.	Armed Forces of the Philippines Medical Center (V. Luna Hospital), V. Luna Ave.	Filipino	2004	
Benigno S. Aquino Jr. "Ninoy"	A political opposition during his time, returned to the Philippines and was assassinated on August 21, 1983.	Aquino residence, Times St.	Filipino	August 21, 1993	
Bulwagang Panlipunan ng DND (Note: Social Hall of DND)	Place where Juan Ponce Enrile and Fidel V. Ramos had a press conference, and after which, the first People Power happened.	Department of National Defense, Camp Aguinaldo	Filipino	February 22, 1991	
Carriedo Fountain	Part of the waterworks system under Governor General Domingo Moriones.	MWSS Compound, Balara	Filipino	July 22, 1982	
Church of the Holy Sacrifice	One of the first primary examples of modern architecture in the Philippines.	Church of the Holy Sacrifice, Laurel Ave., University of the Philippines Diliman	Filipino, English	January 12, 2006; 2008 (English marker); 2015 (English marker replacement)	
Church of San Francisco del Monte	Site was donated to the Franciscans on February 17, 1590. Known as the church where many missionaries who were martyred in Japan, China, and Cambodia came from.	Church of San Francisco del Monte, San Francisco del Monte	English	1936	
Ang Dambana ni Melchora (Tandang Sora) Aquino (6 Enero 1812 – 19 Pebrero 1919) (Note: The Shrine of Melchora (Tandang Sora) Aquino) (6 January 1812 – 19 February 1919)	Where the remains of Melchora Aquino are currently interred, starting 2012.	Banlat Rd., Tandang Sora	English	March 3, 2012	
EDSA People Power	Revolt of 1986 which toppled the Marcos regime and installed Corazon Aquino as president.	People Power Monument, Epifanio delos Santos Avenue, Camp Aguinaldo	Filipino	2011	
Eugenio "Geny" Lopez, Jr. (1928–1999)	Former president (1965–1972, 1986–1993) and chairman emeritus of ABS-CBN Corporation, the country's largest media conglomerate.	ELJ Communications Center, Eugenio Lopez Dr., Diliman	Filipino	2001	
Geronima T. Pecson (1896–1989)	Educator, author, social worker, and first woman senator.	18 Gilmore Ave.	Filipino	July 31, 1995	
Gil J. Puyat	Senator and civic leader. Senate president 1967–1972.	D. Tuazon St.	Filipino	1982	
Horacio de la Costa; 1916–1977	Jesuit Historian and first Filipino superior of the Philippine Jesuits.	De la Costa Hall, Ateneo de Manila University, Loyola Heights	Filipino	June 1, 2017	
Iglesia ni Cristo	Established on July 27, 1914, by Felix Y. Manalo.	Iglesia ni Cristo Central Office, Commonwealth Ave.		July 24, 2014	
Jorge Pineda; 1879–1946	Realist painter. Made lithographs for Carmelo and Bauermann. Made caricatures for the Philippines Free Press.	11 J. Pineda St., Barangay Pag-ibig sa Nayon, Balintawak	Filipino	1982	
Jovita Fuentes; Pebrero 15, 1895 Agosto 7, 1978 (Note: Jovita Fuentes: February 15, 1895, August 7, 1978)	Distinguished opera singer and first female National Artist for Music.	University of the Philippines College of Music, Academic Oval, University of the Philippines, Diliman	Filipino	February 9, 1995	
Kampo Crame (Note: Camp Crame)	Established as part of the Philippine Constabulary, now the headquarters of the Philippine National Police.	Gen. J. delos Reynes St., Camp Crame, Bagong Lipunan ng Crame	Filipino	2011	
Komisyong Konstitusyonal ng 1986 (Note: Constitutional Commission of 1986)	Tasked with the drafting a new constitution, which was ratified through a plebescite on February 2, 1987.	Batasang Pambansa Complex, Batasan Hills	Filipino	1987	
Komisyon ng Serbisyo Sibil (Note: Civil Service Commission)	Started in 1900 at the Ayuntamiento. Became a commission in 1962.	CSC Building	Filipino	September 19, 1983	
Labanan sa San Mateo (Note: Battle of San Mateo)	Historic battle of the Philippine–American War. The forces under Licerio Gerónimo were able to kill Gen. Henry W. Lawton.	Bagong Silangan Barangay Hall, General Licerio Geronimo St.	Filipino	December 19, 1999	
Libreria ni Juan Martinez (Note: Bookshop of John Martinez)	First established along Calle Jolo (Juan Luna St.) in 1902. Publisher of works in Tagalog, Ilocano, and Kapampangan.	Mayon	Filipino	December 8, 1960	
Manuel L. Quezon		Quezon City Hall		August 19, 1978	
Manuel L. Quezon	President of the Commonwealth, "father" of the National Language.	Quezon City Memorial Circle		August 19, 2021	
Maria Paz Mendoza-Guazon	Distinguished woman in medicine. Established relevant organizations for Filipinos.	PAUW Bldg. cor. Matatag and Matalino Sts.	Filipino	October 20, 1984	
Melchora Aquino	Aided Katipuneros, was exiled by the Americans.		English		
Melchora Aquino	Where her remains were placed. Was known as the "Tandang Sora."	Himlayang Pilipino	Filipino	January 9, 1972	
Melchora Aquino (Tandang Sora) (Note: Melchora Aquino (Old Woman Sora))	Mother of the Philippine Revolution. Born on January 6, 1812.	Banlat Rd., Tandang Sora	Filipino	2007	
Mira-Nila Heritage House	Declared as a heritage house by the NHCP.	Mira-Nila Heritage House, 26 Mariposa St., Bagong Lipunan ng Crame	English	June 22, 2011	
Monumento sa mga Bayani ng 1896 (Note: Monument to the Heroes of 1896)	In memory of the heroes of the 1896 revolution. Original location was in Balintawak.	Katipunero Monument, Vinzons Hall, Academic Oval, University of the Philippines Diliman	Filipino	2011	
National Defense College of the Philippines	Founded to establish a relationship between the military and the citizenry for national sovereignty.	DND Compound, Camp Aguinaldo	Filipino	2013	
National Federation of Women's Club of the Philippines	Established in 1921 when about 300 women's clubs gathered in Manila Hotel.	Aurora Aragon Ancestral House compound, Quezon City Circle	Filipino	September 15, 2022	
Paliparang Zablan, P.A.A.C. (Note: Zablan Airfield, P.A.A.C.)	The first aircraft for the Air Force of the Philippines was tested here in 1936.	Camp Aguinaldo	Filipino	May 1, 1968	
Pambansang Dambana ni Quezon (Note: Quezon National Shrine)	Quezon Memorial Committee was established on December 17, 1945, to gather funds for the Quezon National Shrine.	Quezon Memorial Circle, Pinyahan	Filipino	1978	
Pambansang Pang-alaalang Dambana ni Quezon (Note: Quezon National Memorial Shrine)	In memory of Manuel Quezon, president of the Philippine Commonwealth.	Quezon Memorial Circle, Pinyahan	Filipino	August 19, 1990; August 19, 2015 (replacement)	
The Philippine Assembly	First inaugurated at the Manila Grand Opera House by William H. Taft.	Batasang Pambansa Complex, Batasan Hills	English	2007	
Philippine Medical Association	Established on September 13, 1903, under the mission of uniting Filipino doctors.	North Ave., Santo Cristo	Filipino	May 6, 1992	
Rafael Palma (1874–1939)	President of the University of the Philippines, 1923–1933	Palma Hall Lobby, University of the Philippines Diliman	Filipino	December 13, 2024	
Si Melchora Aquino (Tandang Sora) Dito sa Banlat, Kalookan Isinilang Noong 1812 (Note: Melchora Aquino (Old Woman Sora) Here in Banlat, Caloocan was Born 1812)	Heroically aided the revolutionaries. Was exiled to Guam in 1896. Installed in the premises of her family compound.	Banlat (Currently in storage at the Tandang Sora Shrine after the family compound caught fire in 2014)	Filipino	1958	
Ang Sigaw ng Pugad Lawin (1896) (Note: The Cry of Pugad Lawin (1896))	Site where Andrés Bonifacio announced the Katipunan's revolution against Spain.	Pugad Lawin Shrine, Bahay Toro	Filipino	August 23, 1984 (marker stolen)	
Ang Simbahan ng Santo Domingo (Note: The Church of Santo Domingo)	The National Shrine of Our Lady of the Rosary. Inaugurated on January 1, 1588.	National Shrine of Our Lady of the Rosary, Quezon Ave.	Filipino	July 22, 1988	
Social Security System	Decreed by Manuel Roxas in 1948.	SSS Building, East Ave.		September 1, 2008	
St. Luke's Medical Center (Centennial Marker)	Established in 1903.	E. Rodriguez Ave.	English	October 13, 2003	
Teodoro Andal Agoncillo	Historian and author. Wrote books such as History of the Filipino People and The Revolt of the Masses.	952 Quezon Blvd. Extension	Filipino	November 5, 1985	
University of the Philippines	Premier Philippine state university founded on June 18, 1908.	Oblation Statue, Quezon Hall, University of the Philippines Diliman	English	June 18, 1985	
University of the Philippines College of Law	Organized under the initiative of George A. Malcolm in 1910, with help from the YMCA.	Malcolm Hall, Academic Oval, University of the Philippines, Diliman	Filipino	2012	
Unang Brodkast sa Telebisyon Sa Pilipinas (Note: First Television Broadcast in the Philippines)	The first TV broadcast in the Philippines, made by DZAQ-TV Channel 3 of the Alto Broadcasting System (now known as ABS-CBN).	ABS-CBN Broadcasting Center, Sgt. Esguerra Ave., Diliman	Filipino	December 19, 2003	
Upsilon Sigma Phi	Started as a meeting of fourteen students, November 18, 1918.	UP Promenade, University of the Philippines Diliman	Filipino	November 19, 2022	
Veterans Memorial Medical Center	Established under the help of the US Government on July 1, 1948, to serve Filipino veterans.	Veterans Memorial Medical Center, North Ave.	Filipino	November 15, 2005	

== San Juan ==
This table lists 14 markers from the city of San Juan.

Marker title	Description	Location	Language	Date issued	Image
Almacen de Polvora (Note: Gunpowder Magazine)	Gunpowder magazine built in 1781 as preparation for any future attacks on Manila. Targeted by Andrés Bonifacio at the Battle of Pinaglabanan.	San Juan Elementary School Compound, Rivera	Filipino	August 29, 1988	
Battle of Pinaglabanan	Site where the Katipuneros first attacked under the forces of Andrés Bonifacio and Emilio Jacinto.	N. Domingo St.	Filipino	August 29, 1969	
Church of San Juan del Monte	Dominican church and convent built from 1602 to 1604. Used by the revolutionary Filipino forces.	183 F. Blumentritt St., Kabayanan	English	1937	
Church of Santo Cristo	Church and convent built in 1602–1604. Used by the Katipuneros in 1898 during the Philippine Revolution.	140 Pinaglabanan Road, Pedro Cruz	English	1937	
Club Filipino	Established to protect Philippine sovereignty by promoting Filipino culture.	Club Filipino Ave., Greenhills	Filipino	June 19, 1980	
Club Filipino; Bulwagang Kalayaan; 25 Pebrero 1986 (Note: Club Filipino: Independence Hall, 25 February 1986)	Site where Corazon Aquino took her oath as the first female president of the Philippines.	Club Filipino Ave., Greenhills	Filipino	1988	
Ang Club Filipino at ang Partido Nacionalista (Note: The Club Filipino and the Nacionalista Party)	In commemoration of the efforts of the Nacionalista Party members against the Federalista Party members' goal of making the Philippines a US state.	Club Filipino Ave., Greenhills	Filipino	April 29, 1996	
Dating Punong Tanggapan ng Iglesia ni Cristo (Note: Former Head Office of Iglesia Ni Cristo)	Established post-war; burial place of Felix Manalo.	INC Locale of F. Manalo, 529 L. Gruet cor. V. Cruz Street, Brgy. Santa Lucia	Filipino	July 29, 2026	
El Deposito (Note: The Reservoir)	Old Spanish reservoir which supplied Manila. Site of the Battle of Pinaglabanan.	Pinaglabanan Shrine Park, Corazon de Jesus	Filipino	August 30, 1972	
Felipe Agoncillo (1859–1941) at Marcela Mariño Agoncillo (1859–1946)	Burial place of Felipe Agoncillo, the first Filipino diplomat and Marcela Mariño Agoncillo, who sewed the First Filipino flag.	Santuario de Santo Cristo Church graveyard, F. Blumentritt St.	Filipino	September 29, 1982	
Pang-alaalang Dambana ng Pinaglabanan (Note: Pinaglabanan Memorial Shrine)	Shrine park was built by the Pinaglabanan Memorial Commission. Transferred to the National Historical Institute on February 4, 1974.	Pinaglabanan Shrine Park, Corazon de Jesus	Filipino	August 30, 1976	
Ang Simbahan ng San Juan del Monte (Note: The Church of San Juan del Monte)	Planned and built by architect Luis Arellano in 1896. Rebuilt in 1951.	140 Pinaglabanan Rd., Pedro Cruz	English	March 31, 1974	
Tulay ng San Juan (Note: San Juan Bridge)	Served as a boundary between the Filipino and American forces.	N. Domingo St.	Filipino	February 5, 2009	
Victoria Lopez-Araneta	Civic leader and writer. Born on March 6, 1907. Established the White Cross.	White Cross Orphanage, Col. Bonny Serrano Ave.	Filipino	2007	

== Taguig ==
This table lists seven markers from the city of Taguig.

Marker title	Description	Location	Language	Date issued	Image
Jose Rizal (1861–1896)	National hero of the Philippines. First 3D printed statue.	Department of Science and Technology compound, Central Bicutan	Filipino	December 30, 2021	
Manuel L. Quezon	President of the Commonwealth Government. Installed in the first monument for Quezon in the Philippines that was unveiled when he was still alive.	Quezon Monument, Plaza Quezon, Santa Ana	Filipino	February 16, 2024	
Memorare	In memory of Andrés Bonifacio, Supremo of the Katipunan. Monument for his death centenary.	Bonifacio Monument, Makati Linear Park	Filipino	1997, removed November 2017	
Philippine Expeditionary Forces to Korea (PEFTOK)	Deployed by the Philippines under command of the United Nations to defend the Korean Peninsula during the Korean War	Philippine–Korea Friendship Center, Bayani Rd.	Filipino	June 25, 2015	
Pook na Sinilangan ni Felix Y. Manalo (Note: Birthplace of Felix Y. Manalo)	Birthplace of Felix Manalo, the founder of the Iglesia ni Cristo. Built churches in the Philippines and across the globe.	Felix Y. Manalo National Historical Landmark, F. Manalo St., Calzada, Tipas	Filipino	2007	
Simboryo ng Taguig (Note: Taguig Cimborium)	Built under the direction of King Charles IV of Spain for cemeteries to have separate spaces from the church as a way to curb epidemics.	St. Anne Catholic Cemetery	Filipino	November 21, 2025	
Simbahan ng Tagig (Note: Church of Taguig)	Built by Augustinians in 1587 under parish priest P. Diego Alvarez.	Taguig Church façade, General Antonio Luna St., Santa Ana	Filipino	July 25, 1987	

== Valenzuela ==
This table lists five markers from the city of Valenzuela.

Marker title	Description	Location	Language	Date issued	Image
Dr. Pio Valenzuela; 1869–1956; Dakilang Katipunero at Lingkod ng Bayan (Note: Dr. Pio Valenzuela: 1869–1956: Great Katipunero and Servant of the Nation)	Revolutionary and member of the Katipunan. Born on July 11, 1869.	Pio Valenzuela Ancestral House, Dr. Pio Valenzuela St. cor. Kabesang Pino St. Pariancillo Villa	Filipino	July 11, 1966	
Labanan sa Malinta; 26 Marso 1899 (Note: Battle of Malinta: 26 March 1899)	Where the Battle of Malinta between Filipino and American soldiers took place.	Maysan Rd. cor. Agustin St., Malinta	Filipino	April 22, 2013	
Pio Valenzuela; 1869–1956	Became administrator of the press of Katipunan and its publication Kalayaan.	Dr. Pio Valenzuela Museum, Pariancillo Villa	Filipino	February 14, 2023	
Punong Himpilan ng Operasyong Militar sa Maynila (Note: Headquarters of the Military Operations in Manila)	Where Gen. Antonio Luna was stationed against the American forces in Manila.	Old Polo Train Station, MacArthur Highway cor. G. Lazaro St., Brgy. Dalandanan	Filipino	April 15, 2015	
Simbahan ng Polo (Note: Church of Polo)	Established by the Franciscans under the patronage of Saint Diego of Alcala, 1623.	San Diego de Alcala Parish Church	Filipino	November 12, 2024	

== See also ==
- List of Cultural Properties of the Philippines in Metro Manila

== Bibliography ==
- National Historical Institute (1993). Historical Markers: Metropolitan Manila. National Historical Institute.
- National Historical Institute (1993). Historical Markers: Regions I-IV and CAR. National Historical Institute.
- National Historical Institute (2008). Historical Markers (1992 - 2006). National Historical Institute.
- A list of sites and structures with historical markers, as of 16 January 2012
- A list of institutions with historical markers, as of 16 January 2012
