= Honoria Acosta-Sison =

Filipino doctor

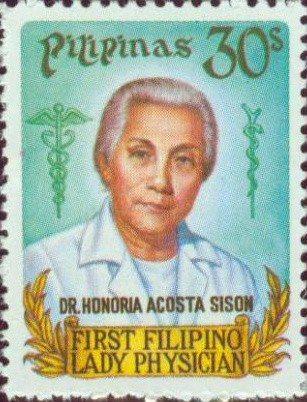
- Acosta-Sison on a 1978 Filipino stamp
- Born: 30 December 1888; Calasiao, Pangasinan, Captaincy General of the Philippines
- Died: 19 January 1970 (aged 81)
- Education: Woman's Medical College of Pennsylvania
- Occupations: First assistant in obstetrics, Philippine General Hospital; Faculty member, University of the Philippines
- Known for: First Filipino woman to become a medical doctor Research on trophoblastic diseases and toxemias of pregnancy
- Spouse: Antonio G. Sison
- Relatives: Teófilo Sison (brother-in-law)
- Awards: Presidential Medal of Merit, 1955 Gold Medal, Woman’s Medical College of Pennsylvania 1959 Most Outstanding Woman Physician, Philippine Women’s Medical Association 1959
- Honours: Stamp with her image, 1978

Honoria Dizon Acosta-Sison (30 December 1888 – 19 January 1970) was the first Filipino woman to become a medical doctor.

== Biography ==
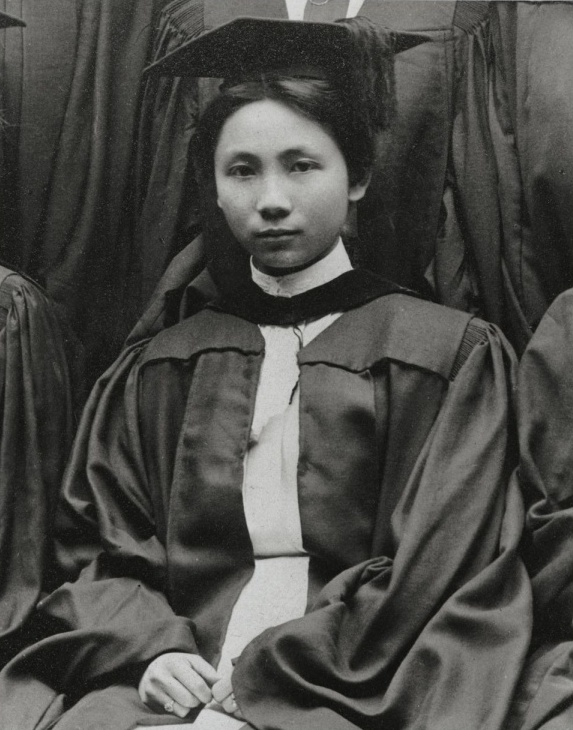
Acosta-Sison in 1909

She was born in Calasiao, Pangasinan in the Philippines and graduated from the Woman's Medical College of Pennsylvania (later absorbed by Drexel University) in 1909. In 1910 she married the director of the Philippine General Hospital of Manila, where she first worked as assistant in obstetrics. She later was first assistant in obstetrics in St. Paul's Hospital in Manila, and in 1914 she became a faculty member at the University of the Philippines. By 1940 she was professor of obstetrics and gynecology and head of the department of obstetrics there.

She was known internationally for her research on trophoblastic diseases and pre-eclampsia in pregnancy.

== Awards and honours ==
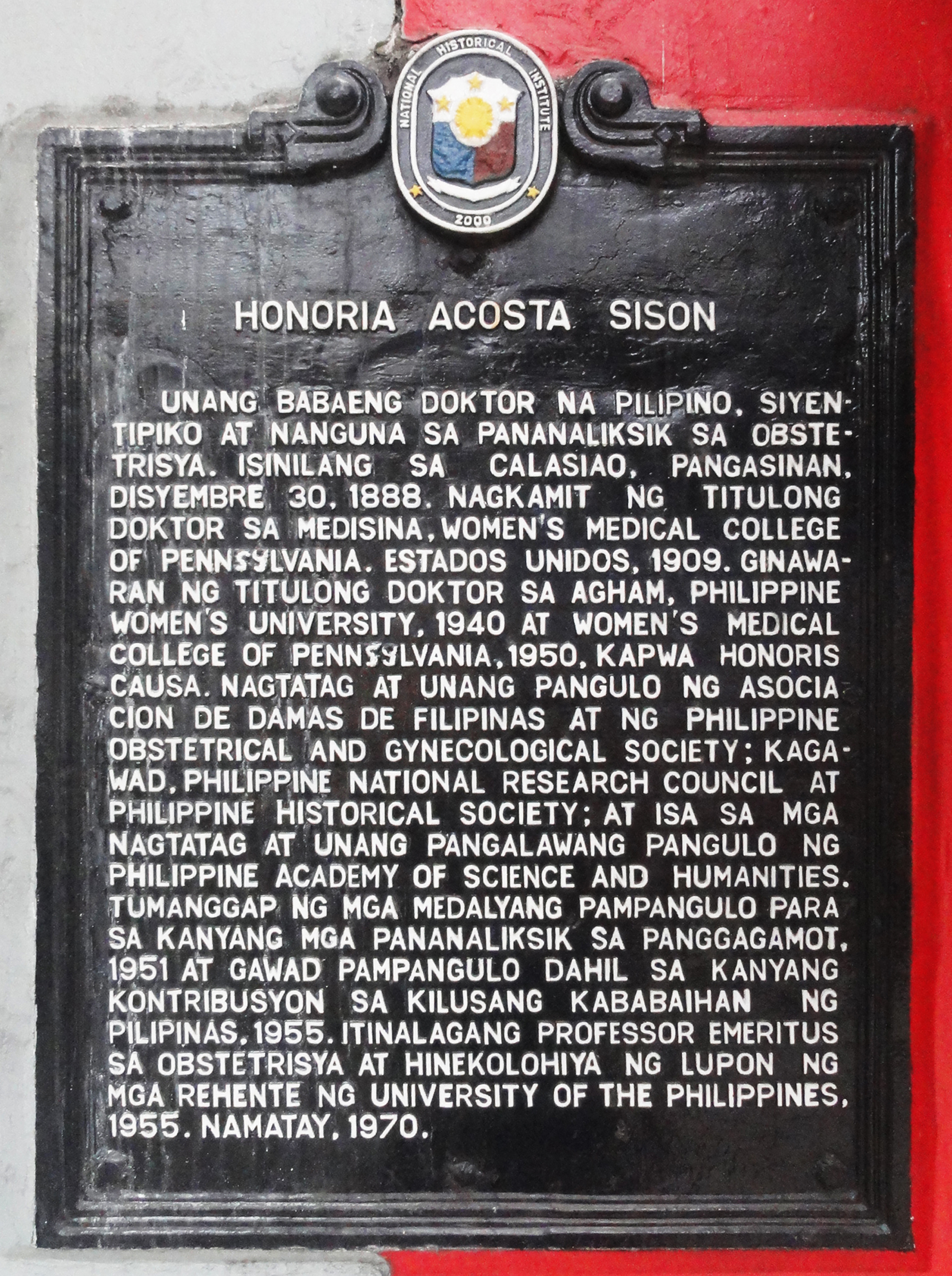
National Historical Institute historical marker installed for Acosta-Sison in Manila.

- Presidential Medal in 1955
- Gold Medal from the Woman's Medical College of Pennsylvania in 1959
- Most Outstanding Woman Physician from the Philippine Women's Medical Association in 1959.
- In 1978, the Philippines issued a commemorative stamp with her name and likeness.
