= Fernanda Balboa =

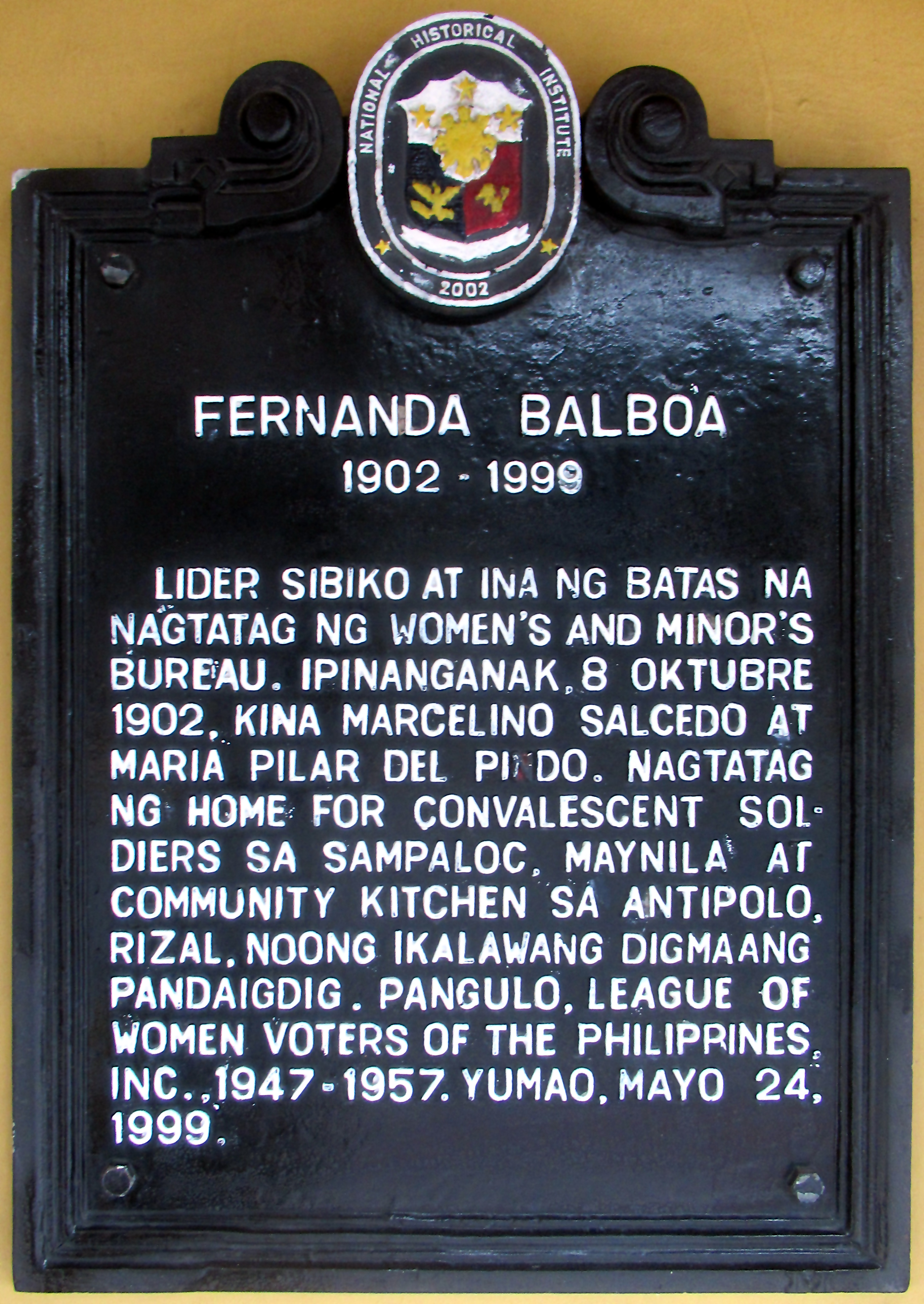
Fernanda Balboa historical marker by the National Historical Commission.

Fernanda Salcedo Balboa (October 8, 1902 – May 24, 1999) was a Filipina civic leader. Daughter of Marcelino Salcedo and Maria Pilar del Prado, she became the head of League of Women Voters of the Philippines from 1947 to 1957. Under her decade of leadership, she transformed it into a corporation and fought for the approval of the New Civil Code. During World War II, she formed the Home for Convalescent Soldiers in Sampaloc, Manila and a community kitchen in Antipolo, Rizal. She also initiated the Women and Minors Bureau of the Department of Labor and Employment.

In 1957, she established the Children's Museum and Library, Inc. She was the president of the Pan Pacific and Southeast Asia Women's Association in 1958. The Atty. Fernanda S. Balboa Youth Leadership Award is named in her honor.

== Early life ==
She was born in Dagupan, Pangasinan. Her parents were Marcelino Salcedo and Maria Pilar del Prado (who was the only child of the revolutionary representative to the malolos convention and first Philippines governor of Pangasinan, general Vicente Prado) who were both teachers from their hometown. At the early age of thirteen, Balboa showed her civic-mindedness by forming a club that would help her community. They used to have a fundraising campaign that would benefit their hometown. Among their projects were the construction of a monument for Dr. Jose Rizal and beautification of the Tayug Plaza by planting acacia trees that surrounded it providing green beauty and shade to its citisens (unfortunately, these trees have all but been cut down in the name of "progress" and an unsightly shopping mall built on the plaza itself); and the reconstruction of the dilapidated town hall. She studied at the Centro Escolar de Senoritas, where she became active in extracurricular works, particularly in their college magazine in which she was the editor. After graduating from college (with honors), she took up law at the Philippine Law School where she also continued her passion for writing.

== Family life ==
In 1926, she married Natalio M. Balboa who was then the legal counselor of the Central Bank of the Philippines. They had seven children, and all of them became professionals. On June 9, 1979, the couple received the Patnugan Award from the CAWP.

== Social and civic works ==
Balboa ran a kindergarten school from 1933 to 1941. She helped finance the studies of the brightest pupils who could no longer support their schooling due to poverty. During World War II, she joined the underground movement, and helped in establishing the home for the soldiers who were recovering from their wounds and illness during the war. She also established a community kitchen in Antipolo and Dimasalang, and in places where food was scarce.

After the war and peace was restored in the country, the Philippine Association of University Women resumed its activities, where she was appointed executive secretary. For eleven years, she was the president of the League of Women Voters of the Philippines, an organization which helped in the passing the New Civil Code, particularly, the inheritance laws. She drafted and worked on the legislation for the creation of the Women's and Minor's Bureau under the Department of Labor.

The Association of University Women recognized her active socio-civic involvement in the country, and as such, granted her a scholarship to Columbia University where she pursued studies in social legislation.

Balboa's life became a living proof of her dedication and participation in the country's civic, social, and political affairs. All this came from her philosophy: "Success is equal to the amount of sacrifice you give".

== Affiliations ==
- Founder and President, Children's Museum and Library Inc., which aims "to discover and develop the ability and talent of the Filipino Youth."
- Founder, Friendship, Inc., which seeks "to generate widespread interest in giving opportunities to former prison inmates to earn decent living for themselves and their families."
- Organizer and Vice President, Women's Rights Movement of the Philippines, which aims "to gather and disseminate information on the status, rights, and obligations of women in the Philippines as well in other countries."
- Organizer and National Coordinator of the National Movement for Free Elections, among its purpose is "to wage a nationwide nonpartisan campaign in the Philippines for free, clean, and honest elections."
- Organizer and acting President of the Pan-Pacific Women's Association of the Philippines during its organizational stage
- President, Pan-Pacific Southeast Asia Women's Association (honorary president)
- Charter member, Philippine Mental Health Association
- Life member, Philippine Association of University Women
- Board member, Organization for the Advancement of the Deaf
- Member, Federacion International de Abogadas
- President, Moral Rearmament Foundation of the Philippines
- Member of the Executive Board, National Association for the Prevention of Alcoholism and Drug Abuse
- Member of the Executive Board, of the International Alliance of Women Conference, held in Germany in 1972
- Vice President, Business and Professional Women's Association of the Philippines

== Awards and citations ==
- Awardee of the Civic Assembly of Women of the Philippines, for her exemplary civic works in 1968.
- Recipient of the award for the Children's Museum and Library, Inc., from CAWP.
