= Manuel A. Roxas High School =

Public high school in Manila, Philippines

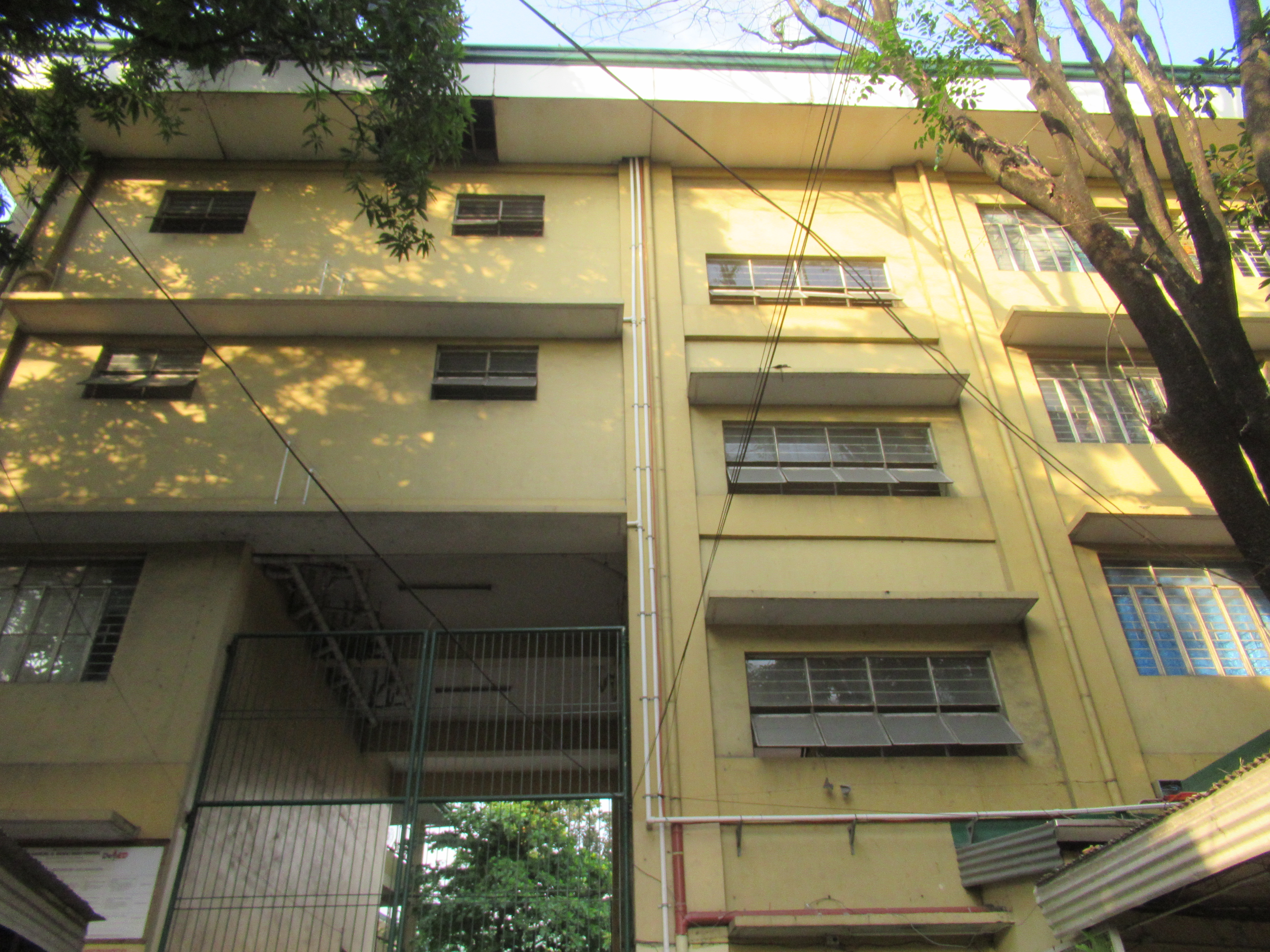

Location
- Pres. Quirino Avenue Extension, Paco; City of Manila; Philippines; 14°34′56″N 120°59′55″E

Information
- Established: 1948
- School district: Five
- Authority: Department of Education (Philippines), Dep-Ed NCR, Division of City Schools-Manila
- Principal: Dr. Roland L. Dela Cruz
- Staff: 185
- Grades: 7 to 12
- Enrollment: Approximately 4125
- Language: English, Filipino
- Campus type: Urban
- Colors: Brown and Yellow
- Slogan: Roxas Forever, Excellence Together!
- Song: Martsa Roxas (hymn)
- Nickname: MARHS, Roxas
- Newspaper: The Wheel and Ang Gulong
- Website: https://marshs.netlify.app/

Manuel A. Roxas High School is a public high school in Paco, Manila, Philippines. It is one of the six schools in Manila to provide the Special Science course (STE) for selected students.

The first building of Roxas High School was situated in Quezon Boulevard near Feati University. It was established in 1948 and is the first high school to be named after a former president, Manuel Acuña Roxas.

== Special Science (STE) ==
The establishment of the Special Science curriculum was spearheaded by the Department of Science and Technology- Science Education Institute in the 1980s. For the moment, support form DOST has been withdrawn and Special Science classes are maintained by the Division of City Schools in the implementing schools namely Manuel A. Roxas High School, Ramon Magsaysay High School, Victorino Mapa High School, Cayetano Arellano High School and Manuel Araullo High School, with the exception of Manila Science High School which is a recognized science high school.

== Facilities ==
The School has seven buildings - the Main (L-Shaped), Vocational, Maceda, Hizon, Home Economics, SEDP and Administration buildings and three makeshift structures, two of which are temporary.

The Main, Vocational, Maceda and Hizon buildings house the academic subject classes. The H.E. building is now used by the Science and Technology Department. The SEDP building is where H.E. classes are held. One of the two Guidance offices, the Museum, and EMIS office occupy the Administration, Marcos-type, building.

As of June 2006, the Main building, which is the most used, was declared "condemned" and unfit for use. This was explained by the impact of the 1990 earthquake that hit Manila. After the declaration, the school was forced to squeeze schedules and rooms. This called for 13 makeshift rooms.

On February 22, 2008, President Gloria Macapagal-Arroyo led the groundbreaking for the PHP 220 million 4-storey building to replace the old structure. Also present in the event were Manila Mayor Alfredo S. Lim, Manila 6th District Rep. Benny Abante and 5th District Rep. Amado Bagatsing and Education Secretary Jesli Lapus.
