= Third Order of the Franciscans Church (Manila) =

Defunct Roman Catholic church in Manila, Philippines

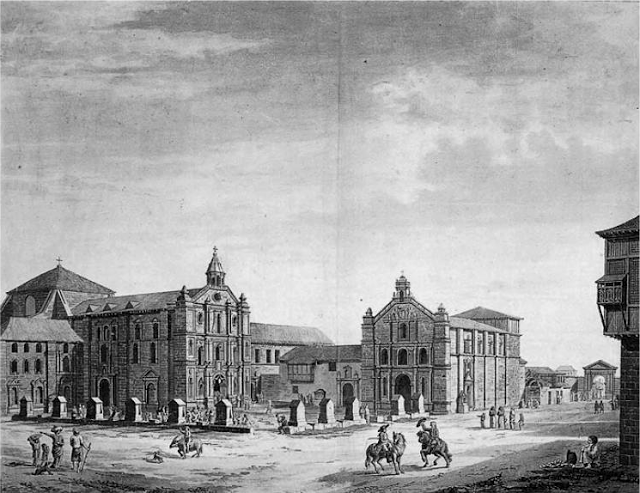
- Intramuros in the 1700s, with the Third Order of the Franciscans Church seen on the right
- Third Order of the Franciscans Church
- 14°35′28″N 120°58′42″E
- Location: San Francisco and Solana Streets, Intramuros, Manila
- Country: Philippines
- Denomination: Roman Catholic

History
- Status: Inexistent
- Dedication: Immaculate Conception

Architecture
- Heritage designation: Historical marker from the Historical Research and Markers Committee of the Philippines
- Designated: 1935
- Architectural type: Church building
- Demolished: 1945

The Third Order of the Franciscans Church is a defunct church in Intramuros, Manila, Philippines. The church was destroyed during World War II. The site is currently occupied by Mapua University.

== History ==
The Third Order of the Franciscans Church was a church for the lay branch of the Franciscans, known as the Third Order. The original structure was a small chapel completed in 1618. It was later renovated and enlarged in 1734.

The church sustained damages during the earthquakes in the 1800s, and was later rebuilt with twin towers added. In 1935, the Historical Research and Markers Committee, now the National Historical Commission of the Philippines, installed a historical marker on the site.

The church was destroyed during the 1945 Battle of Manila. The site is currently occupied by Mapua University.
