= Bonifacio Drive =

Major road in Manila, Philippines

Coordinates: 14°35′22″N 120°58′18″E

R-1 Bonifacio Drive

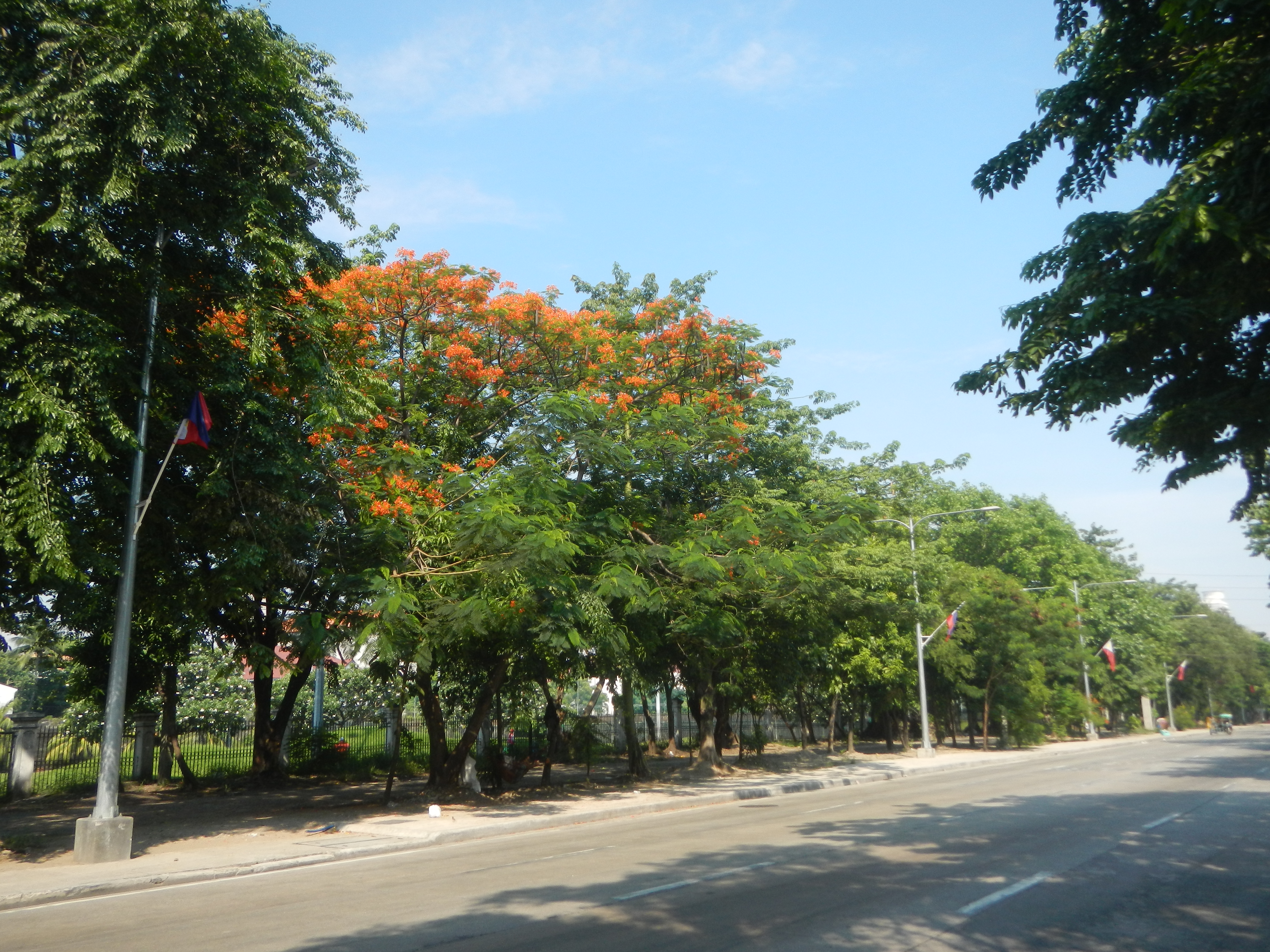

Route information
- Auxiliary route of AH 26 (26)
- Maintained by Department of Public Works and Highways
- Length: 1 km (0.62 mi) Approximate length (from Google Maps)

Major junctions
- North end: Anda Circle in Port Area and Intramuros
- South end: AH 26 (N120) (Roxas Boulevard) / N150 (Padre Burgos Avenue) / Katigbak Parkway in Ermita and Intramuros

Location
- Country: Philippines
- Major cities: Manila

Highway system
- Roads in the Philippines; Highways; Expressways; List

Bonifacio Drive is a road running approximately 1 kilometer (0.62 mi) in a north-south direction between Intramuros and the Port Area in Manila, Philippines. The boulevard is also designated as Radial Road 1 (R-1) of Manila's arterial road network, National Route 120 (N120) of the Philippine highway network, and an auxiliary route of Asian Highway 26 (AH26).

The boulevard is named after national hero Andrés Bonifacio, the Supremo of the Katipunan and thus the father of the 1896 Philippine Revolution against the Spanish Empire.

Another street in Manila is also named Bonifacio Drive. It is located at the Tutuban Center shopping complex in Tondo.

== History ==
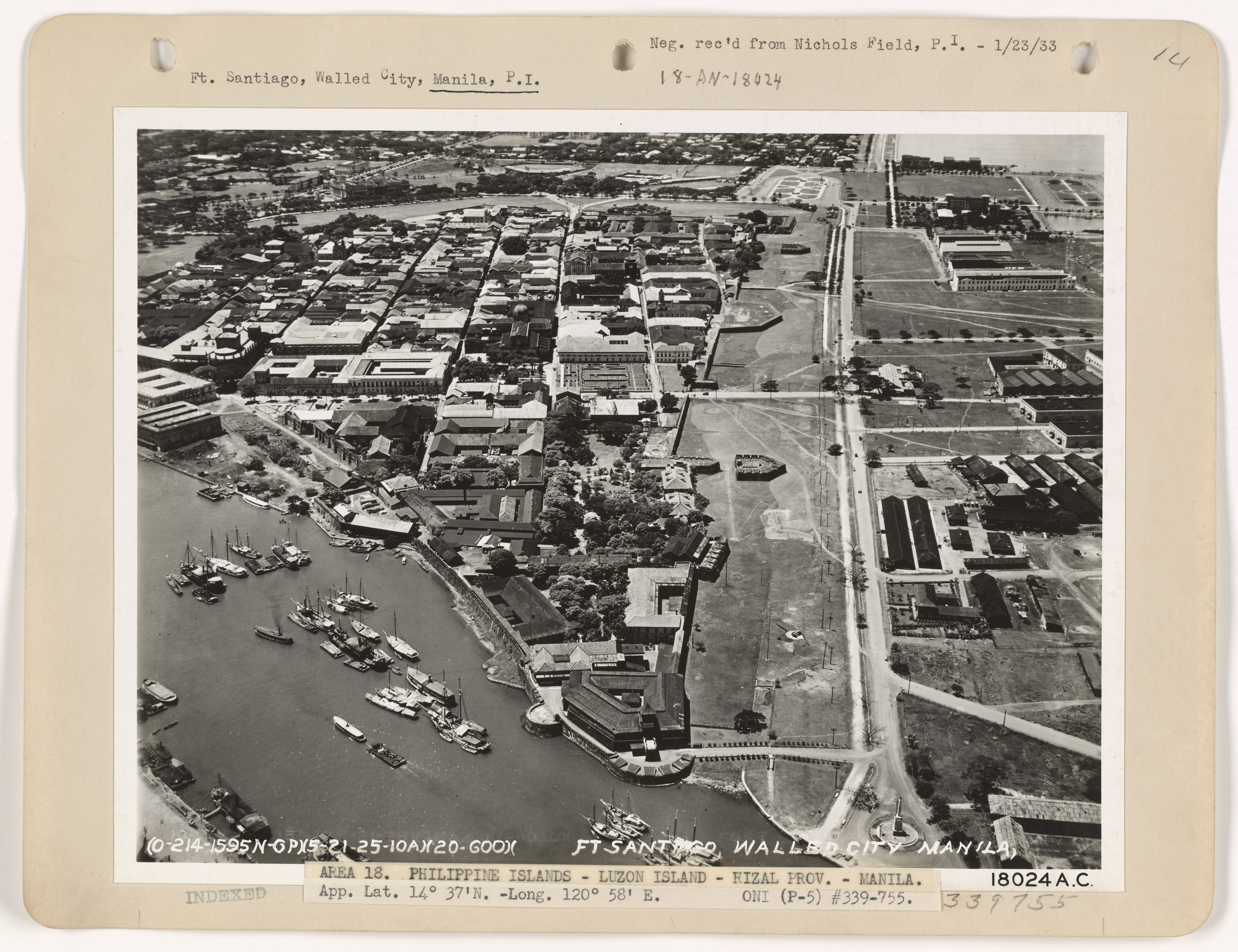
Aerial view of Intramuros (left) with Calle Bonifacio (right), 1933

The road was previously called Malecon Drive during the American period. During Spanish rule, it was known simply as Malecón (Spanish for waterfront esplanade), as the road was such before the reclamation of South Harbor (Port Area) during the late 19th century. It was also known alternatively as Paseo de María Cristina, after the then Queen of Spain Maria Cristina, or Paseo de Santa Lucia. It was later renamed to Calle A. Bonifacio or Calle Bonifacio. It used to connect Luneta Park to the southern bank of the Pasig River, where the Anda Monument was previously located. After World War II, the monument was transferred to its present site at the road's intersection with Calle Aduana, which was converted into a present-day roundabout called Anda Circle. In 1975, Roxas Bridge (also known as Del Pan Bridge and in the present-day as Mel Lopez Bridge) was built to connect Bonifacio Drive to the northern parts of Manila across the Pasig River.

In 2019, Bonifacio Drive's section from Anda Circle to Roxas Bridge became part of the newly-renamed Mel Lopez Boulevard by virtue of Republic Act No. 11280.

== Route description ==
Bonifacio Drive is the northern extension of Roxas Boulevard from Padre Burgos Avenue and Katigbak Parkway in Rizal Park to Anda Circle, where it intersects Andrés Soriano Avenue (formerly Calle Aduana), the main road to Intramuros, and Roberto Oca Street, a road to Port Area. North of the traffic circle, Bonifacio Drive continues as Mel Lopez Boulevard, heading into North Harbor and the districts of San Nicolas and Tondo via Roxas Bridge (also known as Del Pan Bridge and Mel Lopez Bridge) over the Pasig River.

== Landmarks ==
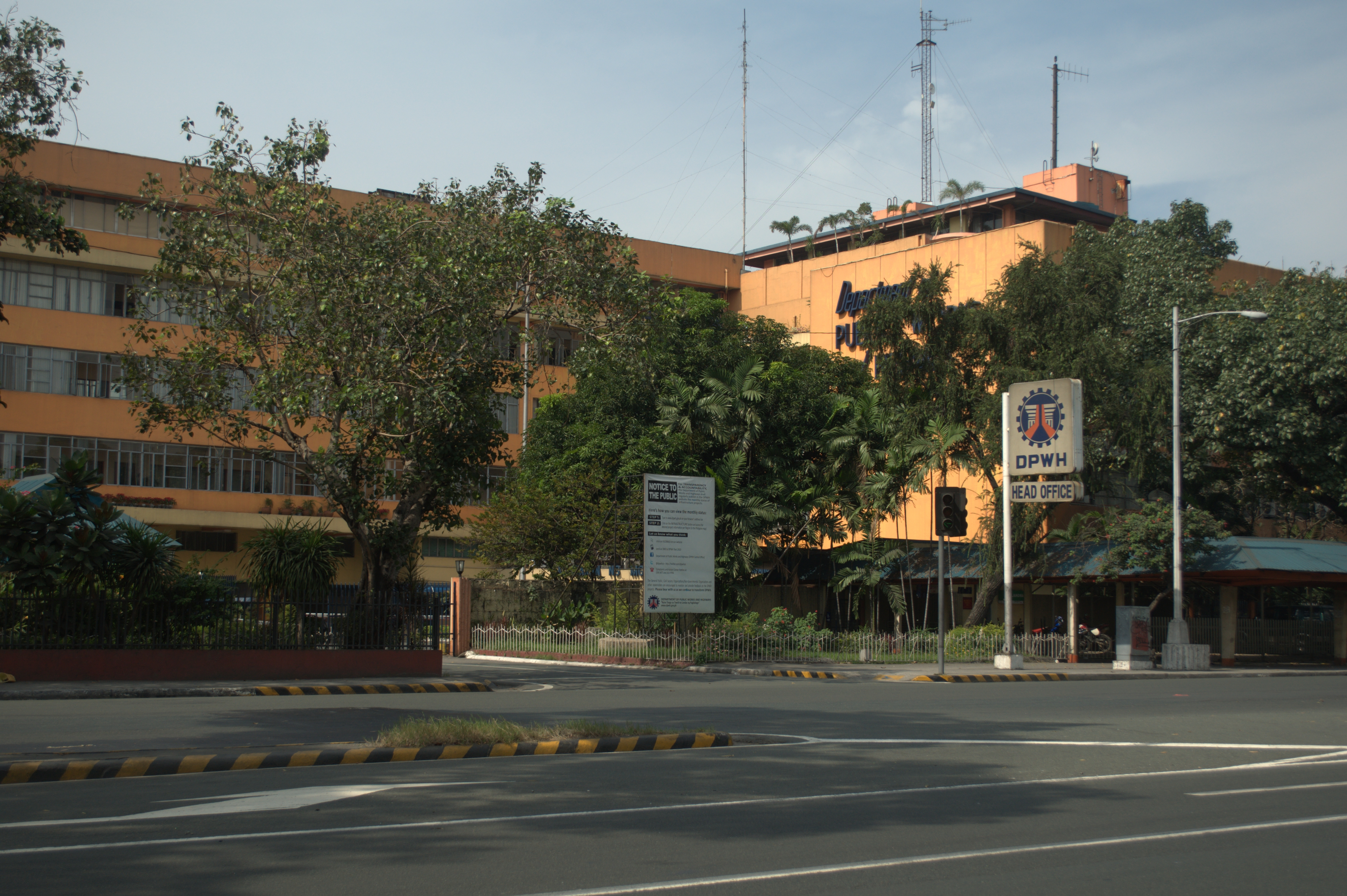
The Department of Public Works and Highways head office along Bonifacio Drive

Establishments along Bonifacio Drive include the Manila Hotel, the Department of Public Works and Highways headquarters, the Philippine Ports Authority headquarters, the headquarters of the Order of the Knights of Rizal, the Port Area office of National Power Corporation (which once housed the MMDA Workers' Inn), and the Santa Lucia Gate. Located on the east of the entire stretch of the road is the Club Intramuros Golf Course.
