= Lagusnilad =

- Vehicular and pedestrian underpass
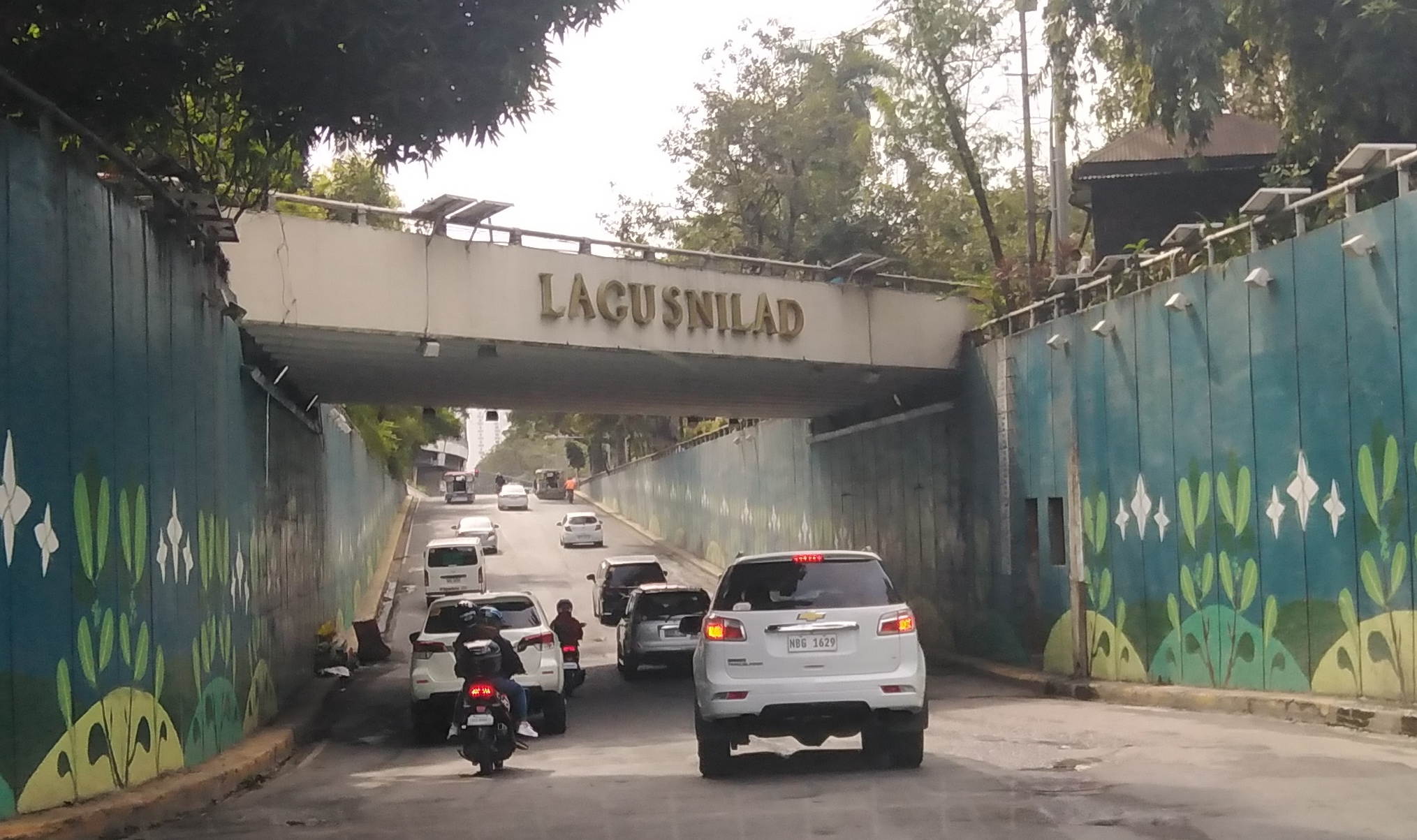
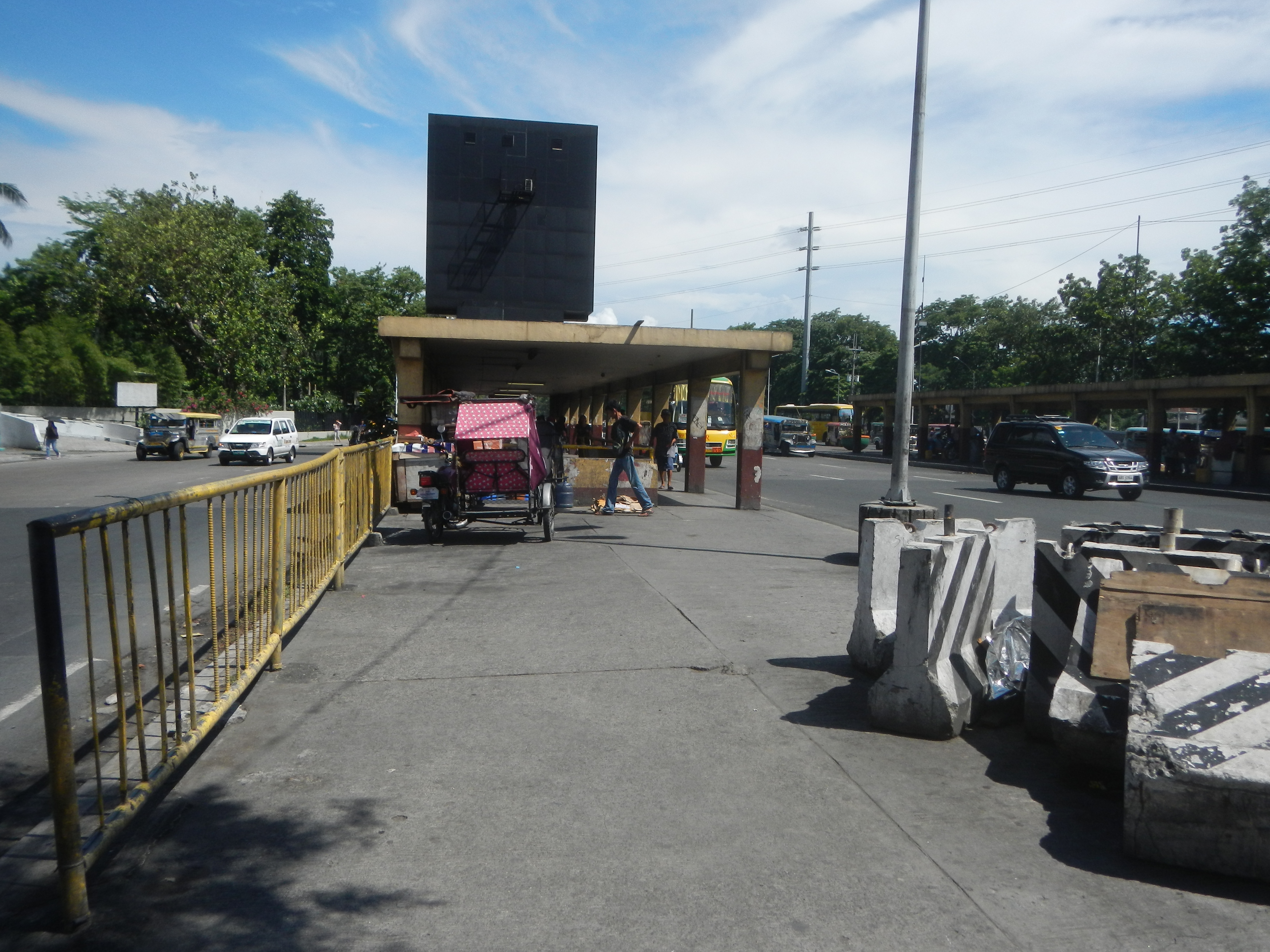
- The vehicular underpass (top), and the pedestrian underpass prior to the 2019–20 renovations (below)
- Completed: 1960s
- Owner: City Government of Manila
- Location: Padre Burgos Avenue, Manila, Philippines
- Interactive map of Lagusnilad
- Coordinates: Pedestrian underpass: 14°35′22.8″N 120°58′50.9″E; Vehicular underpass: 14°35′19″N 120°58′52″E

The Lagusnilad Underpass refers to the pedestrian underpass in Manila, Philippines which connects the Manila City Hall and Intramuros. It also refers to the nearby vehicular underpass where part of the Taft and Padre Burgos Avenues merge.

== History ==
The Lagusnilad vehicular underpass is said to be the first in the Philippines and in Asia. The underpass was built in the 1960s as a replacement to the at-grade road intersection of Taft and Padre Burgos Avenues near the Manila City Hall. It was named as "Lagusnilad" by the city government of Manila during the tenure of Mayor Antonio Villegas.

The vehicular underpass was prone to flooding from around the 1980s to the early 2010s due to high level of rainfall during the monsoon season. Water flowing from the Intramuros Golf Course also contributes to the flooding. By 2014, this problem was remedied by the installation of new pumping system and cleaning of the underpass' drainage in 2014 during the administration of then-Mayor Joseph Estrada.

Prior to the 2020s, the pedestrian underpass is reputed for its high incidence of crime as well as vendors doing business in stalls in its walkway including a thrift bookstore. The walkway was decorated by tiles and white-painted walls.

In 2019, Mayor Isko Moreno started a major renovation of the pedestrian underpass. In preparation for the renovation, illegal vendors were cleared from the walkway. The Manila city government partnered with University of Santo Tomas College of Architecture alumni John Benedict Fallorina, Sean Patrick Ortiz, Leon Centeno Tuazon, and faculty member Juanito Malaga, MTLA; and the National Commission for Culture and the Arts for the underpass’ overall design.

The renovated pedestrian underpass was inaugurated on August 24, 2020 where a 25-meter-long (82 ft) mural depicting significant figures and events throughout the history of Manila was unveiled. The mural also featured frontliners and civil servants as a tribute to their efforts during the COVID-19 pandemic. As part of the redesign, many features were implemented to address previous common complaints about the pedestrian underpass.

In 2023, the vehicular underpass underwent rehabilitation initiated by the city government, starting with a partial closure on May 2, followed by a complete closure on June 13. It reopened to the public on November 28, 2023, with new lighting installed on both sides and solar studs on the flooring.

== Features ==
=== Vehicular underpass ===
The road of the Lagusnilad vehicular underpass is below ground level. If the underpass is flooded, the water may be as deep as 20 meters (66 ft). Above the vehicular underpass' tunnel is a bridge carrying the northbound lanes of Padre Burgos Avenue.

=== Pedestrian underpass ===
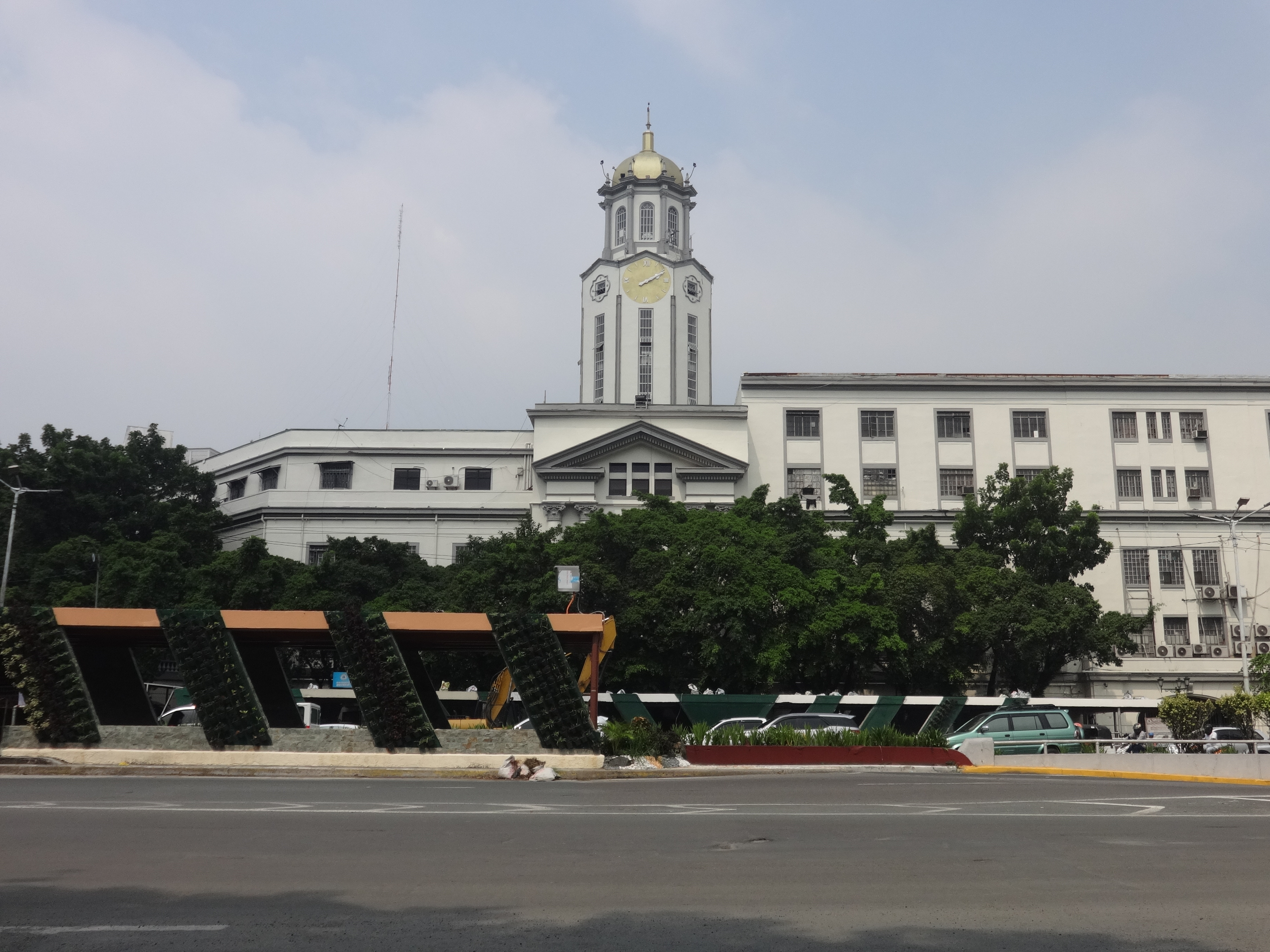
The Manila City Hall in 2020, with the Lagusnilad pedestrian underpass entrance in the foreground.

==== Design ====
The redesign was proposed by University of Santo Tomas College of Architecture alumni John Benedict Fallorina, Sean Patrick Ortiz, Leon Centeno Tuazon, and faculty member Ar. Juanito Malaga, MTLA.

The design takes inspiration from the Spanish Colonial influences of Intramuros and the displays of art found in the National Museum of the Philippines, both of which are connected to Manila's City Hall by the pedestrian underpass.

As part of the redesign, many features were implemented to address previous common complaints about the pedestrian underpass. Non-slip slate tiles were installed to prevent slipping during rainy seasons. 24/7 lighting and security cameras were installed to deter crime. Books from Underground, a thrift store which formerly did business in the underpass' walkway will be the only establishment allowed by the city government to operate.

The underpass also features directional signages that include writing in Baybayin designed by Far Eastern University alumna Raven Angel “Ramri” Rivota. The National Commission for Culture and the Arts and Baybayin Buhayin, Inc. also helped to ensure accurate translation and proper use of font.

==== Mural ====
Mural at the Lagusnilad Pedestrian Underpass

The 25-meter-long (82 ft) and 2.4-meter-tall (7.9 ft) mural was designed and completed by artists Marianne Rios, Jano Gonzales, and Ianna Engano; members of the artist collective Gerilya. The artists were chosen by the National Commission for Culture and the Arts who were tasked by the Manila City Hall's Department of Engineering and Public Works.

The mural, titled "Masigasig na Maynila", depicts significant events and figures throughout the history of Manila. Such figures depicted include Andrés Bonifacio, José Rizal, Emilio Jacinto, Rajah Sulayman, and many others. Production on the mural started in late February 2020 but was halted due to the COVID-19 pandemic. When work resumed, depictions of frontliners and civil servants were added to the mural as a tribute to their efforts throughout the pandemic. The mural was unveiled as the main centerpiece during the inauguration which took place on August 24, 2020, a week before National Heroes' Day.

==== Bas relief ====
As part of the redesign, a Bas relief is planned to be installed to complement the mural.

==== Interactive display ====
An interactive display showing information about the City of Manila including tourist destinations and public transport routes is also planned to be installed.

==== Books from Underground ====
In 2019, Mayor Isko Moreno started a major renovation of the pedestrian underpass. In preparation for the renovation, illegal vendors were cleared from the walkway. Due to public outcry, one vendor, AJ Laberinto of Books from Underground, was permitted to operate once more at the pedestrian underpass. A stall complete with bookshelves was included in the design to allow the bookstore to operate.
