= Gwapotel =

Hotel in Manila, Philippines

Coordinates: 14°37′27″N 120°58′41″E

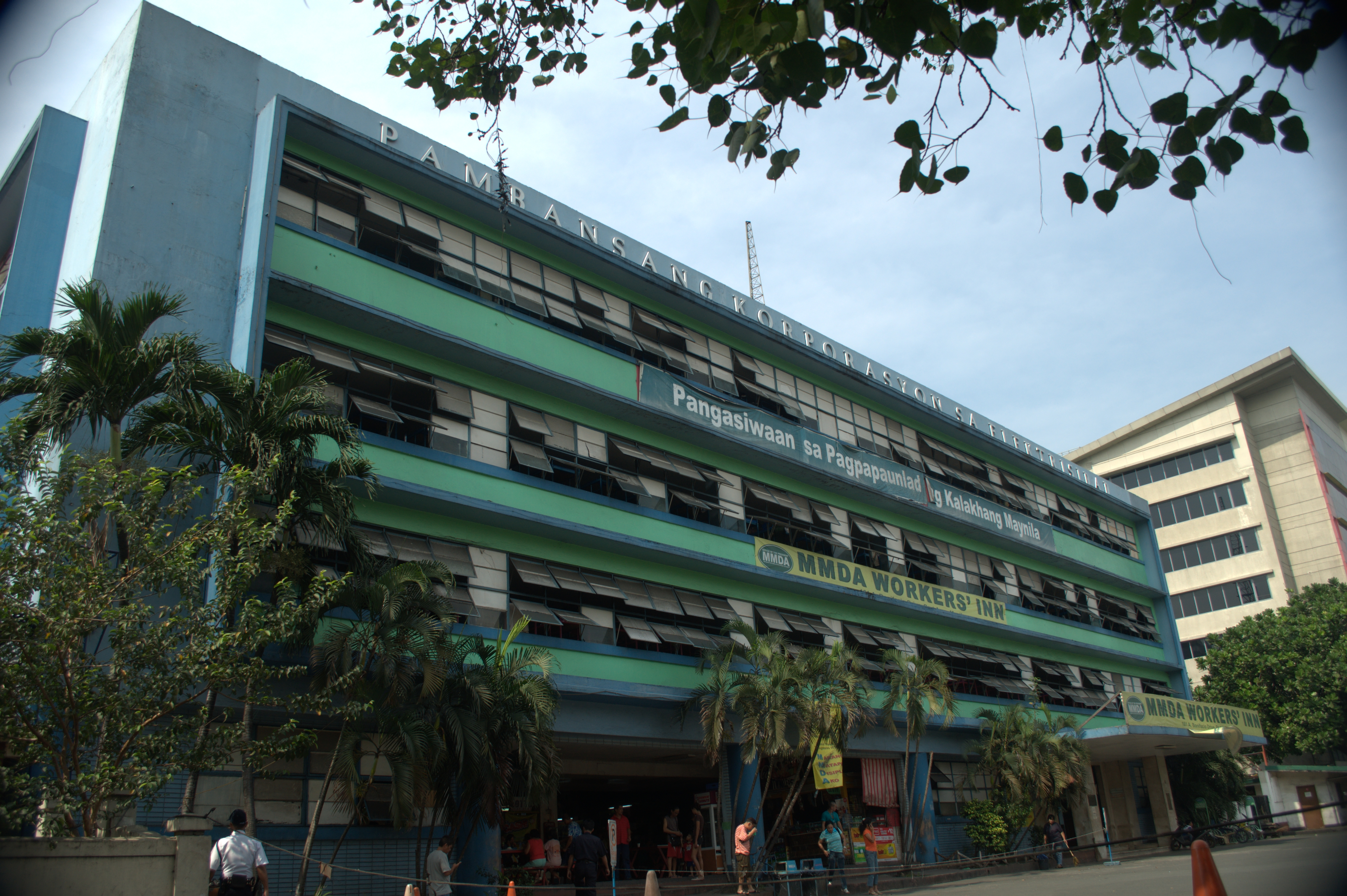
- The MMDA Workers' Inn at the Manila South Harbor
- Product type: Hotel
- Country: Philippines
- Introduced: 2007
- Discontinued: 2017
- Markets: Metro Manila
- Previous owners: Metropolitan Manila Development Authority

Gwapotel is a portmanteau of gwapo, a Filipino term which means good-looking, and hotel. The word is used by Metropolitan Manila Development Authority Chairman Bayani Fernando to a worker's inn he founded in the old refurbished 4-story building which formerly houses the National Power Corporation located along Bonifacio Drive, Port Area, Manila.

It was later renamed as the MMDA Worker's Inn and was in operation until August 2017.

== Branches ==
=== Port Area ===
On September 6, 2007, Chairman Fernando said that the “Gwapotel Inn” (Overnight stay: P20 a night, P5 a bath) run by the Metropolitan Manila Development Authority has become a big hit with transients due to safe and decent lodgings. 40,000 transients have registered in the 4-story “hotel” on Erano Drive, Port Area, Manila, since its May 14, 2007 opening. The 710-bed inn, painted in Mr. Fernando's signature pink and blue, posted an average occupancy rate of 73%, or 519 guests daily. The overnighters share a common sleeping area with double-deck beds.

Under the chairmanship of MMDA Chairman Francis Tolentino, they renovated and upgraded the Gwapotel in 2015, adding more amenities, improvements, and CCTV cameras.

By 2016, the Gwapotel has deteriorated with its walls painted with graffiti and has already experiencing a bed bug infestation.

In 2017, Chairman Danilo Lim closed the inn, citing outdated building standards that rendered the building unsafe, and that the building was borrowed from the National Power Corporation. While they have expressed interest in rehabilitating the building to continue operations, no current plans or a timeline to reopen the inn have been announced.

=== Tondo ===
A second branch of Gwapotel was opened in Tondo, Manila in 2008. The Gwapotel occupied a 3-storey building previously used by the Emmanuel Hospital. It operated as a capsule hotel. However it closed in 2011 due to low occupancy and reported aversion to "coffin beds".
