= Baseco Beach =

Beach in the Philippines

- Beach
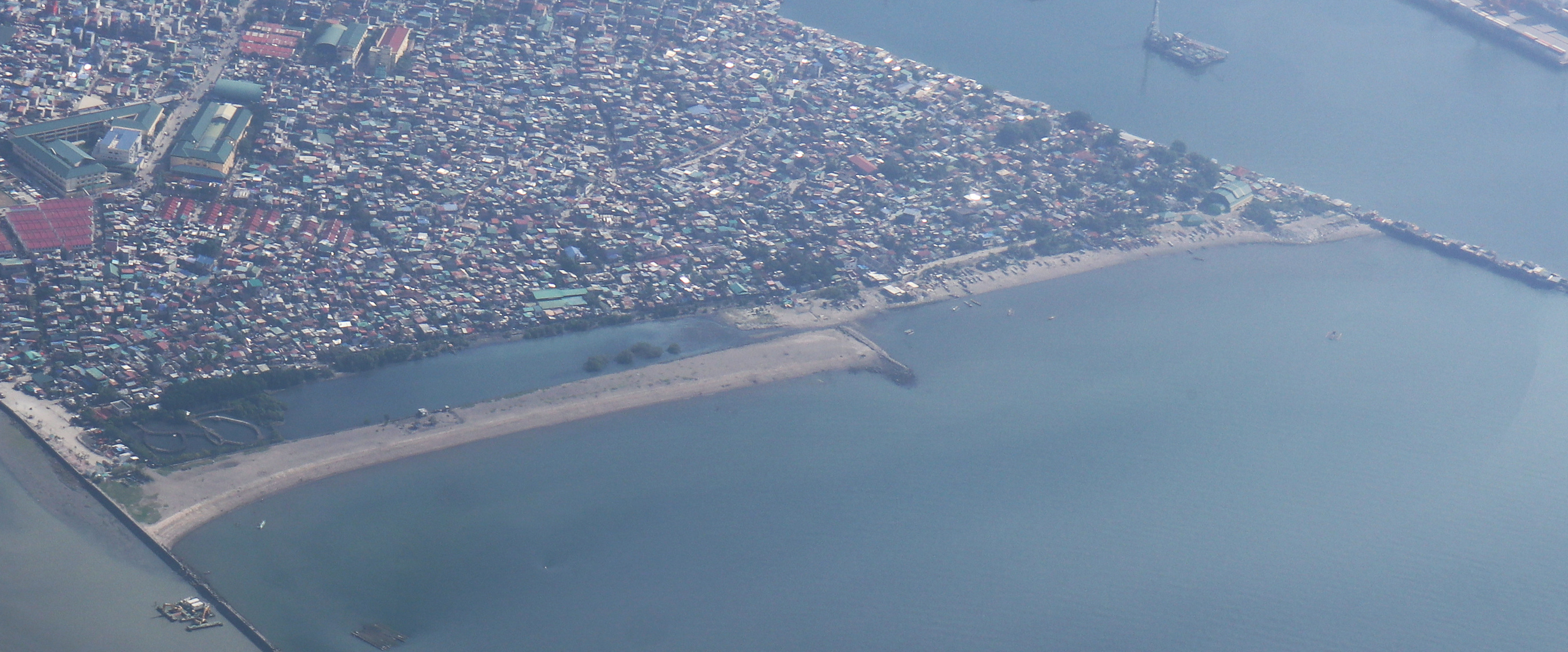

- Coordinates: 14°35′20.0″N 120°57′16.0″E
- Location: Port Area, Manila, Philippines
- Offshore water bodies: Manila Bay

Baseco Beach is an urban beach located at Baseco Compound in Port Area, Manila, Philippines. The city redeveloped part of the beach as Baseco Park, using recycled materials such as rehabilitated old lamp posts from other parts of the city.

== Impact ==
=== Health ===
Despite dangerous coliform levels in waters adjacent to the beach, some Manila residents frequently visit Baseco Beach. A communal septic tank was set up to reduce the coliform level waters near the beach.
