= Padre Burgos Avenue =

Street in Manila, Philippines

Coordinates: 14°35′21″N 120°58′50″E

C-1
- Padre Burgos Street
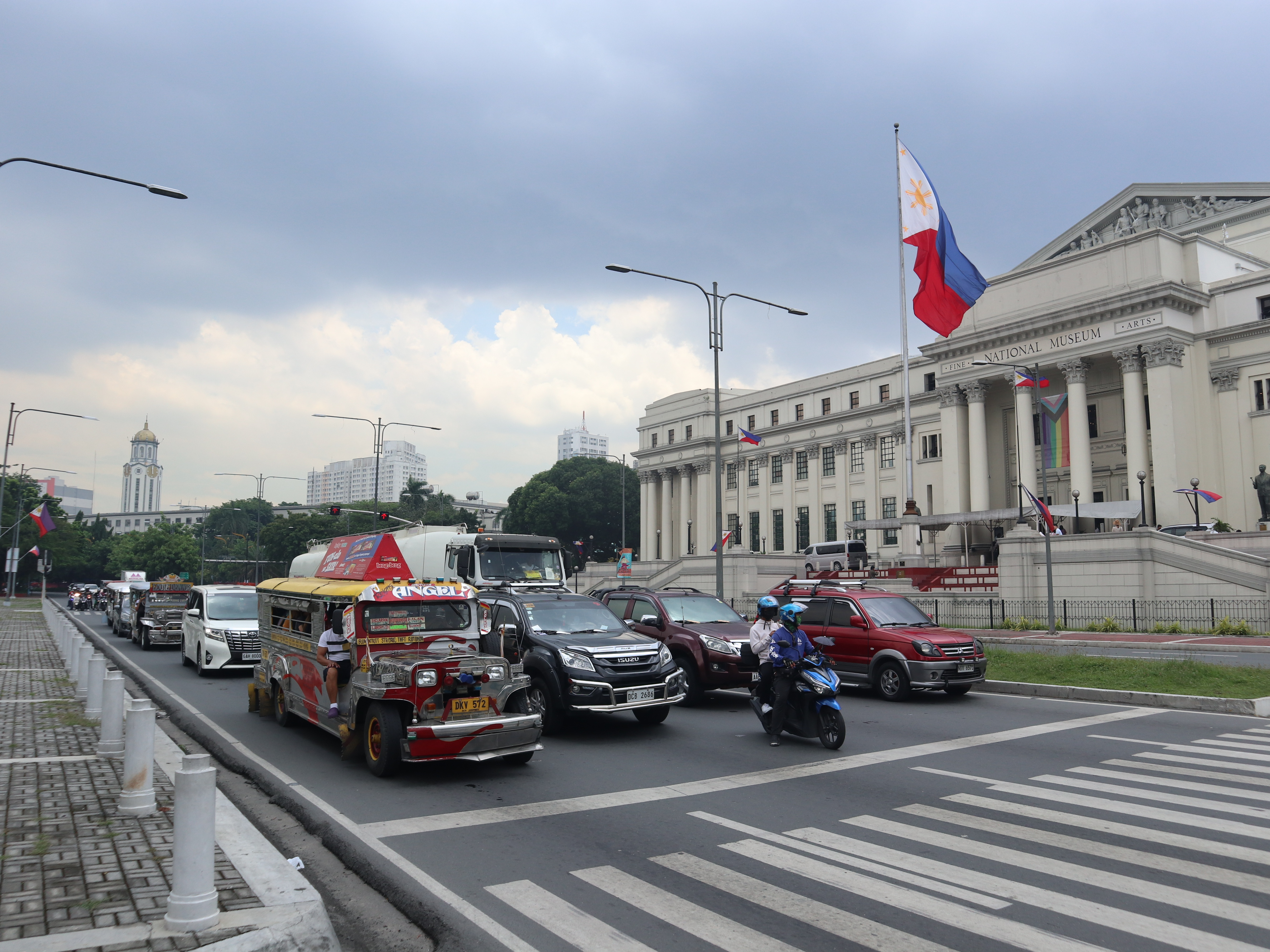
- Padre Burgos Avenue with the National Museum of Fine Arts (foreground) and the Manila City Hall (background)
- Interactive map of Padre Burgos Avenue
- Former names: Paseo/Calzada de las Aguadas; Paseo/Calzada de Sebastián Vidal; Paseo/Calzada de Bagumbayan
- Part of: C-1 C-1 from Finance Road to Roxas Boulevard & Bonifacio Drive; N150 from Roxas Boulevard & Bonifacio Drive to MacArthur Bridge; N170 from Quezon Bridge to Liwasang Bonifacio (southbound only)
- Namesake: Jose Burgos; Sebastián Vidal y Soler (formerly)
- Maintained by: Department of Public Works and Highways - South Manila District Engineering Office
- Length: 1.7 km (1.1 mi); Approximate length
- Location: Manila
- North end: Near Liwasang Bonifacio in Ermita
- Major junctions: N170 (Taft Avenue); N180 (Finance Road)
- South end: AH 26 (N120) (Bonifacio Drive and Roxas Boulevard) in Ermita and Intramuros

Padre Burgos Avenue, also known as Padre Burgos Street, is a 14-lane thoroughfare in Manila, Philippines.

The road was named after Jose Burgos, one of the martyred Gomburza priests who were executed at the nearby Bagumbayan Field (present-day Rizal Park) in 1872. It is a road in the city center, providing access to important thoroughfares like Taft Avenue, Rizal Avenue, Roxas Boulevard, and Quezon Boulevard. The avenue is a component of Circumferential Road 1 (C-1) of Metro Manila's arterial road network and National Route 150 (N150) and National Route 170 (N170) of the Philippine highway network. The Manila City Hall can be accessed using this road, as can the Rizal Park and Intramuros.

== Route description ==
Padre Burgos Avenue starts at the end of Jones Bridge, MacArthur Bridge, and Quezon Bridge, respectively, at the southern bank of the Pasig River near Liwasang Bonifacio. It then merges near Mehan Garden and continues south until it branches to two – Taft Avenue and itself – when it reaches the National Museum of Fine Arts at Rizal Park. It will then turn sharply right, intersecting with Finance Drive, the major thoroughfare of Rizal Park, which leads to Ayala Boulevard and Ayala Bridge, and, after that, the other parts of C-1. Padre Burgos Avenue ends with a junction with Roxas Boulevard, Bonifacio Drive, and Katigbak Drive, its logical continuation towards Quirino Grandstand.

The avenue is a component of National Route 150 (N150), except for its southbound segment between Quezon Bridge and Liwasang Bonifacio Overpass, which is a component of National Route 170 (N170). Its segment from its southern end at Roxas Boulevard and Bonifacio Drive, both components of Radial Road 1, to Finance Drive, is a component of Circumferential Road 1 (C-1).

== History ==
The origin of Padre Burgos Avenue could be traced back to a street running in parallel along the moat surrounding the walled area of Intramuros, called Paseo de las Aguadas or Calzada de las Aguadas, Calzada de Vidal or Paseo de Sebastián Vidal (apparently named after Spanish botanist Sebastián Vidal y Soler, director of the nearby Botanical Garden of Manila), and Calzada de Bagumbayan or Paseo de Bagumbayan (for being the street that leads to Bagumbayan Field). It used to end at Plaza Lawton on the north. It was also one of the right-of-way alignments of tranvía that existed until 1945. The avenue's present-day section near Quezon Bridge occupies what was known as Calle Colgante, which provided access to the bridge's predecessor, Puente Colgante.

== Landmarks ==
Starting from the northern terminus, the road passes the following:

- Manila Central Post Office
- Metropolitan Theater
- Liwasang Bonifacio
- Mehan Garden
- Universidad de Manila
- Bonifacio Shrine
- Manila City Hall
- Lagusnilad
- National Museum of Fine Arts
- National Museum of Anthropology
- Rizal Park
- Roundtable
- National Planetarium
- Club Intramuros Golf Course
- Manila Hotel
