= Baseco Compound =

Baseco Barangay 649, Zone 68
- Barangay
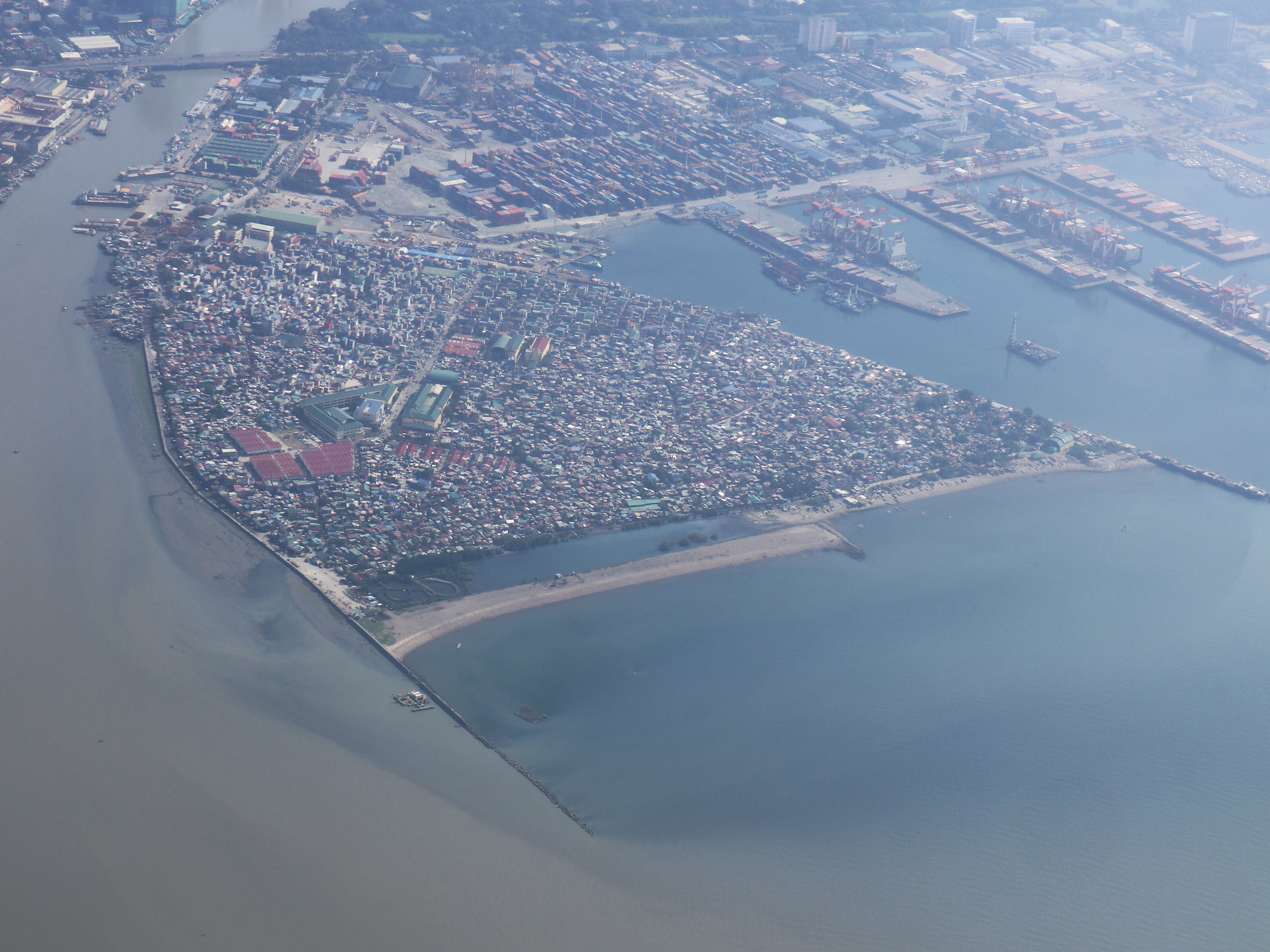

- Location within Manila
- Coordinates: 14°35′26.4″N 120°57′28.7″E
- Country: Philippines
- Region: National Capital Region
- City: Manila
- District: 5th District of Manila

Government
  - Type: Barangay

Population (2020)
  - Total: 64,750
- Time zone: UTC+8 (PST)

Baseco, also known as the Baseco Compound or Barangay 649, Zone 68, is a barangay in Port Area, Manila. It largely consists of Engineer's Island.

== History ==
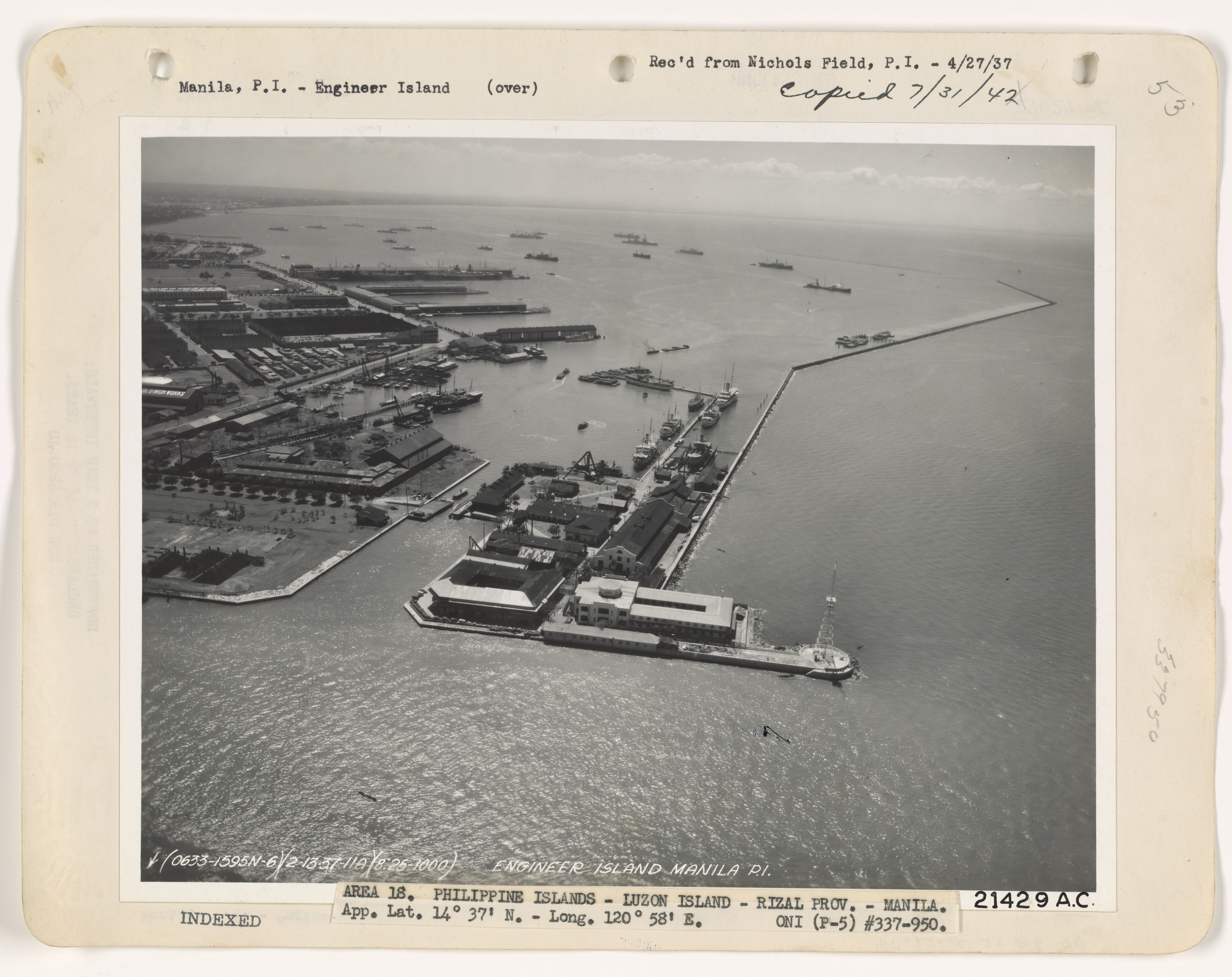
Aerial view of Engineer Island, 1937

The land which covers Baseco today was once the location of a dockyard of the National Shipyard and Steel Corporation (NASSCO). In 1966, during the administration of then-President Ferdinand Marcos, NASSCO was acquired by the Romualdez family, the kin of the president's wife Imelda Marcos, through the Bataan Shipping and Engineering Company or BASECO. In the late 1970s, the urban poor population were resettled by the Marcos administration to give space for a possible international seaport. Baseco was formally declared a barangay (Barangay 649, Zone 68) in the 1980s. Following the People Power Revolution of 1986, the national government under Marcos' successor Corazon Aquino sequestered the property and the urban poor population began to resettle the area.

People settled in an area within Baseco which would later be designated as "Block 40". At least 39 other blocks would be established. By 1999, Baseco attained full access to electricity. On February 12, 2002, then-President Gloria Macapagal Arroyo proclaimed Baseco as a residential site.

In July 2021, BaseCommunity, a housing project of the Manila city government in the compound, was inaugurated.

== Geography ==
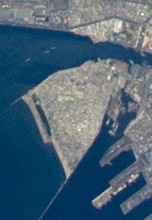
Engineer's Island

Baseco consists of Engineer's Island including two stone breakwaters one which borders the Pasig River and another the South Harbor. Prior to 1980, the two breakwaters were two separate islands (Big Island and Small Island). Baseco's area has been increased by reclamation both by the government, Non-profit organizations and the residents. The area also has a beach which is frequented by some Manila residents despite dangerous levels of coliform in its adjacent waters.

The area is prone to flooding due to typhoons and strong monsoon rains.

== Governance ==
Baseco is a barangay and is designated as "Barangay 649, Zone 68" of the City of Manila. The lowest-level government officials in Baseco are the block coordinators who serve the residents of their respective "blocks".

== Demographics ==
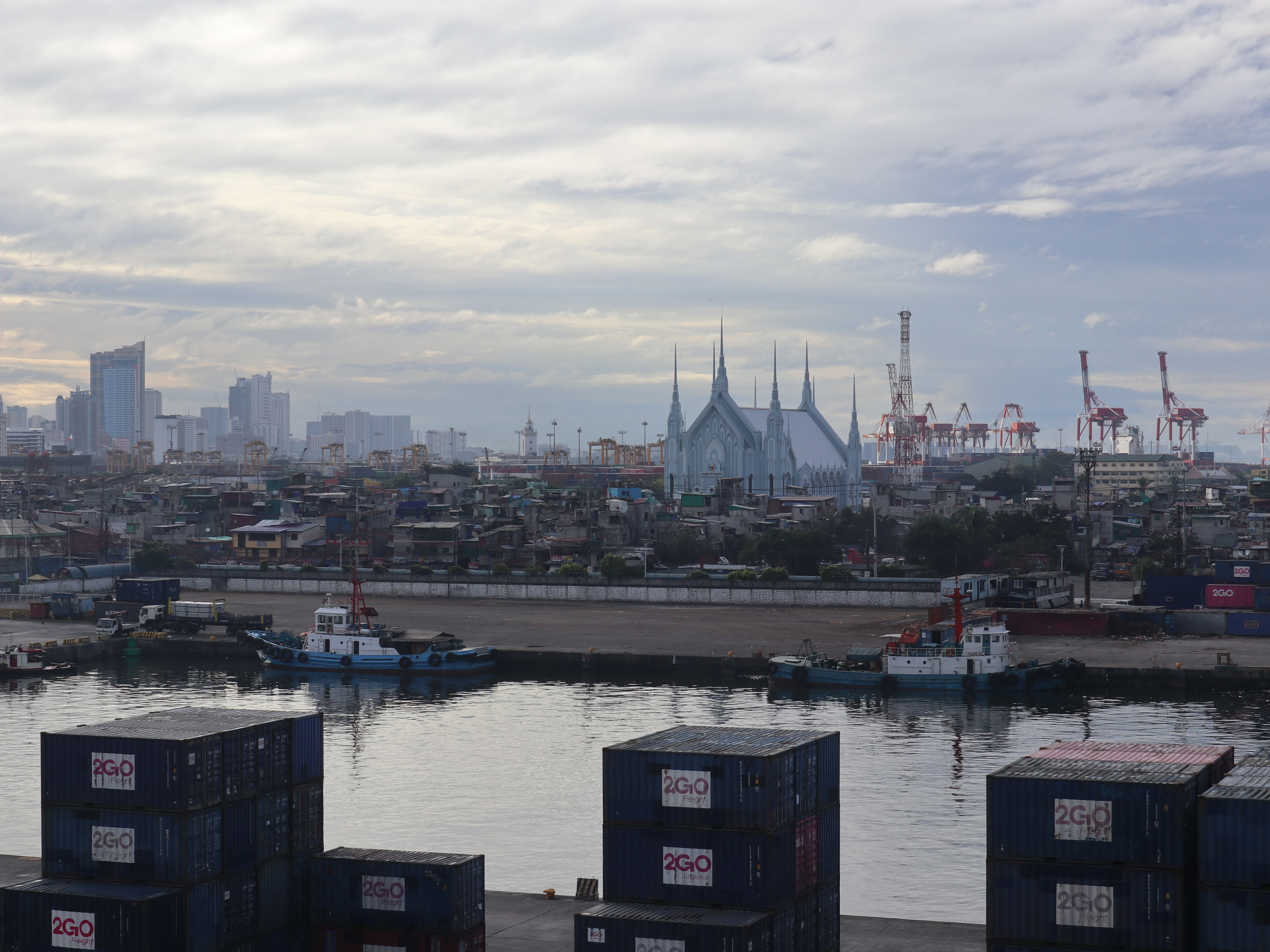
Baseco Compound as seen from Manila International Container Terminal in Tondo

From the 1960s to the 1970s, families of employees in then-existing shipyard in the area settled in Baseco. At that time only around 15–20 families lived in Baseco. In the early 2000s, the population of Baseco is around 47,017.

== In popular culture ==
The Baseco Compound was the plot setting for the episode 'Paa' of the 2010 horror film Cinco.
