= Manila City Hall =

City hall of Manila

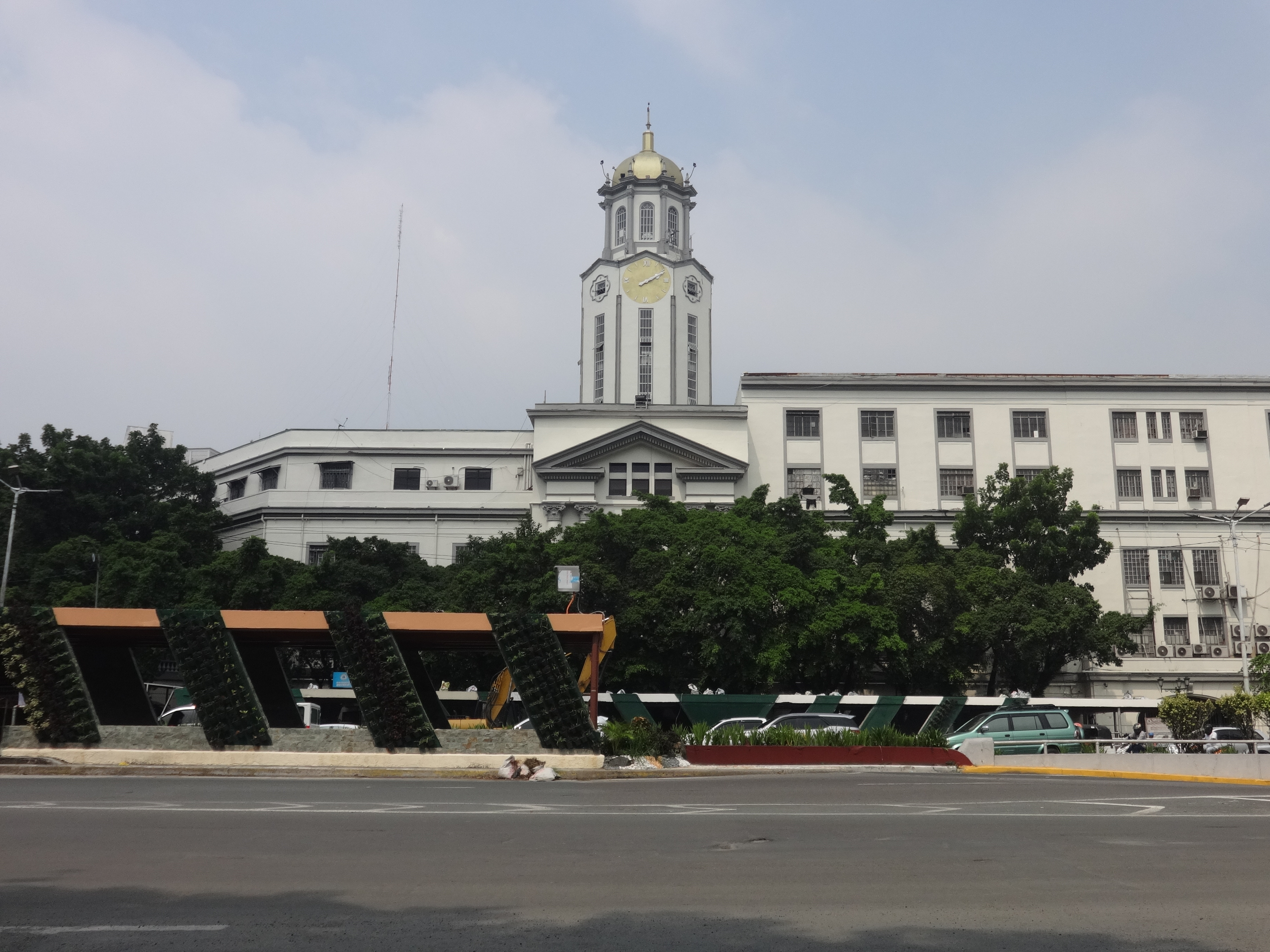
- The Manila City Hall as seen from Padre Burgos Avenue
- Interactive map of the Manila City Hall area

General information
- Status: Completed
- Type: City Government building
- Architectural style: Neoclassical
- Location: No. 333 Antonio J. Villegas Street corner Padre Burgos Avenue & Natividad Lopez Street, Ermita, Manila, Philippines
- Coordinates: 14°35′23″N 120°58′54″E
- Construction started: 1939
- Completed: August 19, 1941
- Opening: 1941
- Owner: City of Manila
- Operator: City of Manila

Technical details
- Floor count: 5
- Lifts/elevators: 4

Design and construction
- Architect: Antonio Manalac Toledo
- Developer: City of Manila

Other information
- Public transit access: Central Terminal; 6 Manila City Hall; 6 17 39 Lawton; Lawton

The Manila City Hall (Filipino: Bulwagan ng Lungsod ng Maynila) is the official seat of government of the City of Manila, located in the historic center of Ermita, Manila. It is where the Mayor of Manila holds office and the chambers of the Manila City Council is located. It was originally intended to be a part of a national government center envisioned by Daniel H. Burnham in the 1900s. Although the dream plan was not fully implemented, some buildings for the proposed government center were constructed, including the Old Legislative Building (now the National Museum of Fine Arts), and the Agriculture and Finance Buildings (presently the National Museum of Anthropology and National Museum of Natural History).

== History ==
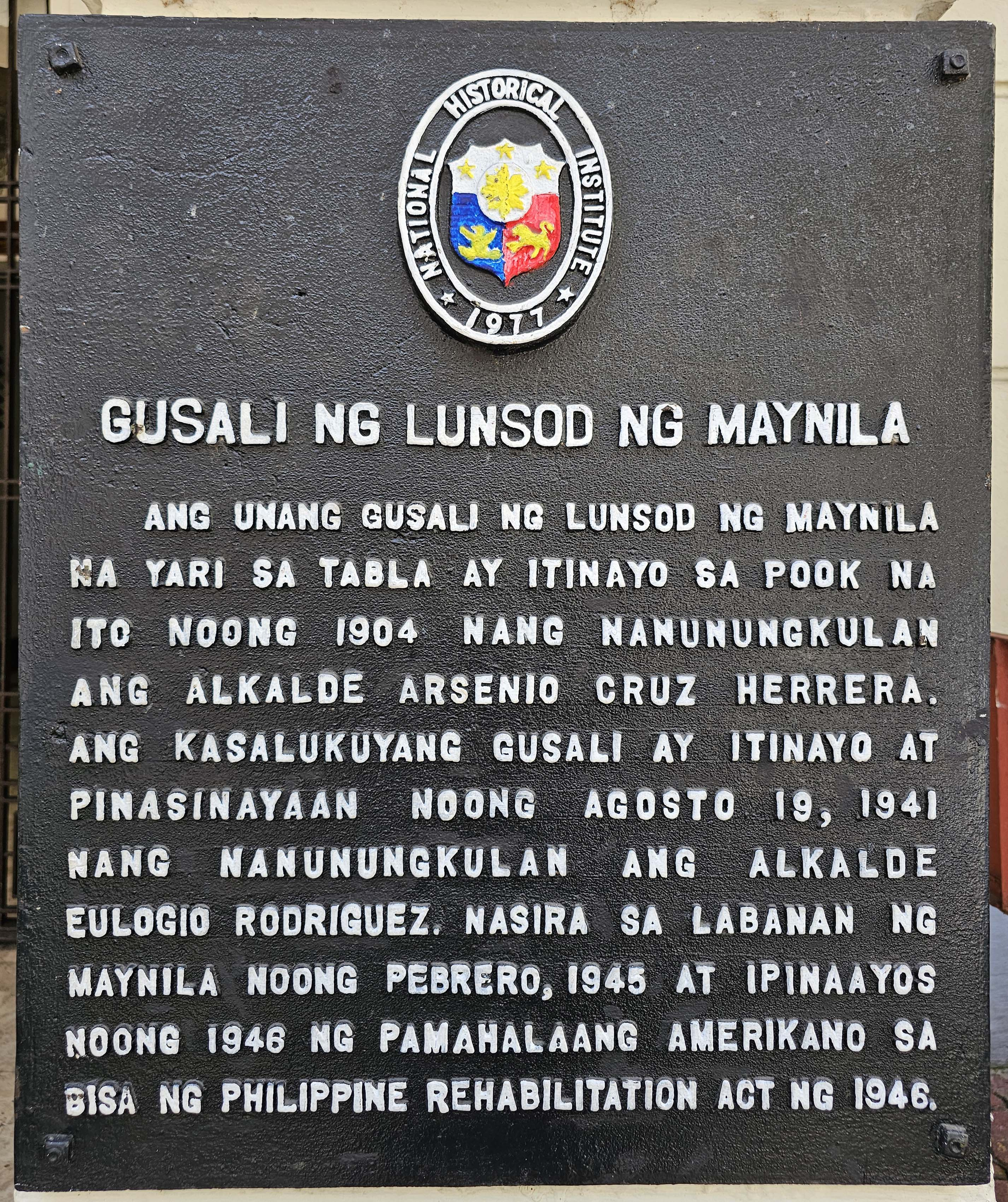
Historical marker installed in 1977

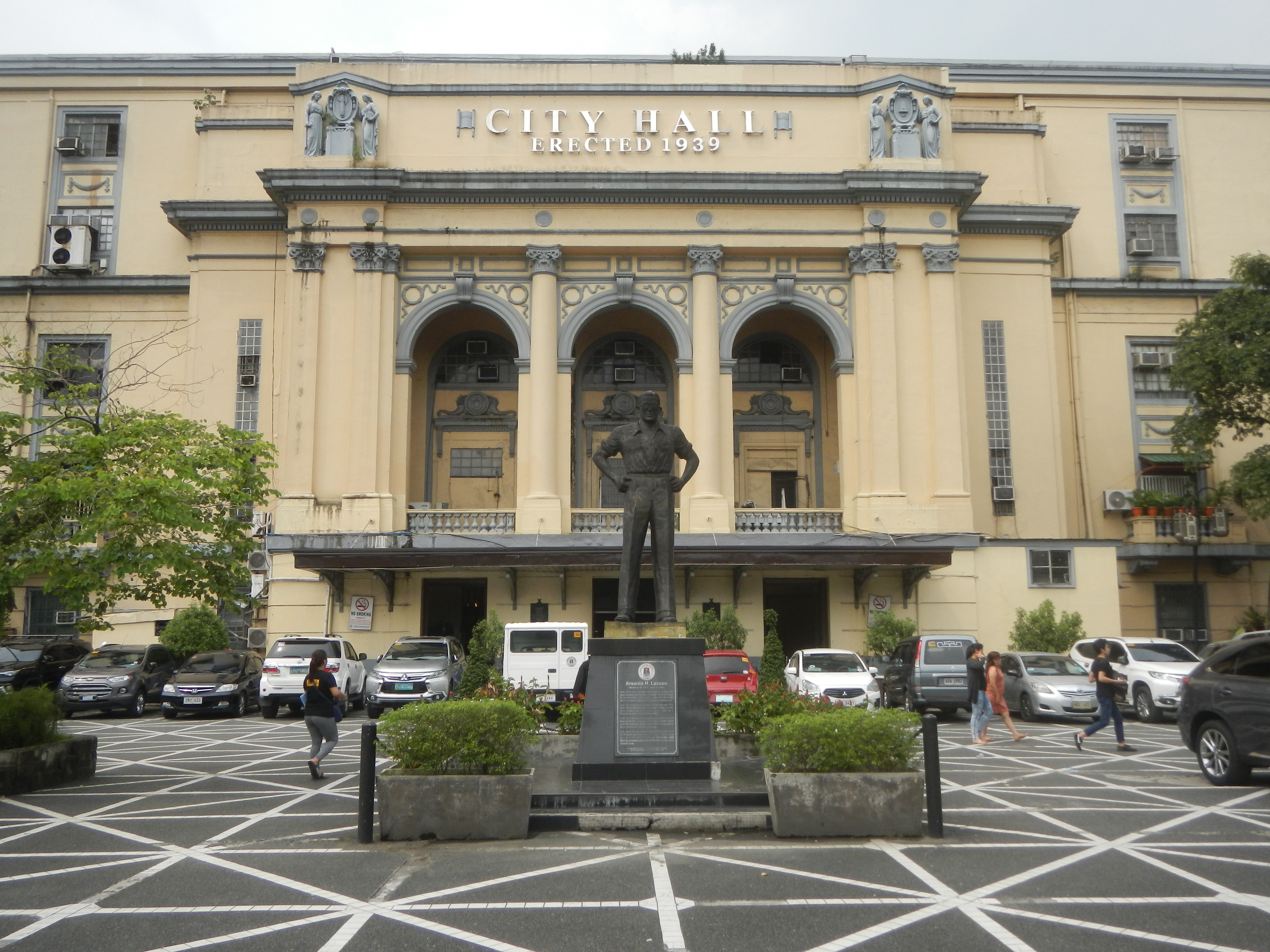
The City Hall's South Entrance and the Arsenio H. Lacson Monument

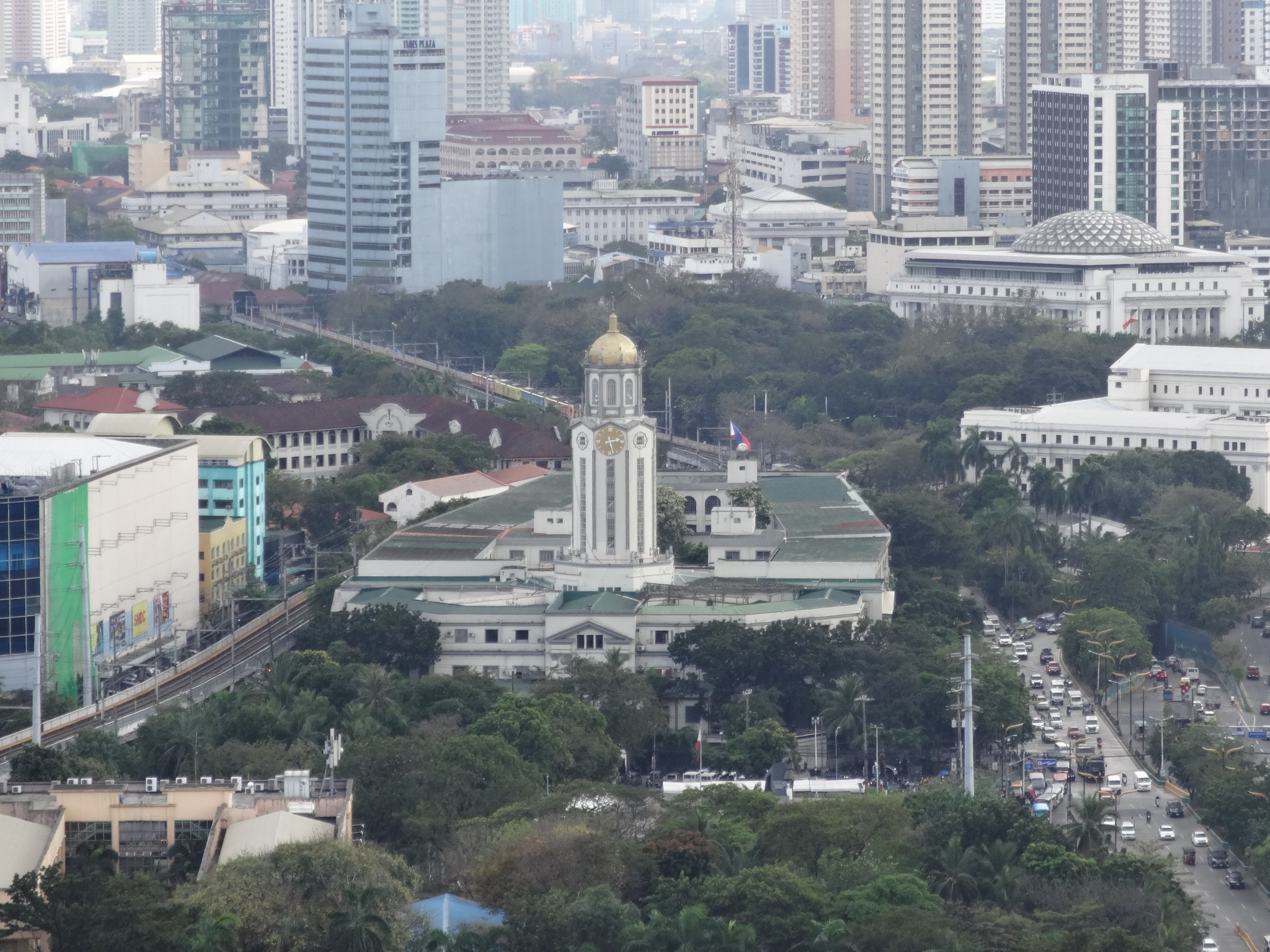
City Hall from the air

The Manila City Hall during 1901 was made up of Oregon-pine which covered one third of the area used by the current building. After 31 years of occupancy, City Engineer Santiago Artiaga suggested to reinforce the floor of the weakened structure supporting the session hall used by the municipal board and avoid the accommodation of too many people along the corridors and in the hallway. Eventually, the old city hall was demolished.

In the 1930s, a new City Hall was constructed, which had uniform windows on all sides. This was designed by Antonio Manalac Toledo, the same architect who built the Finance and Old Legislative Buildings which were both adjacent to the new City Hall. Finished in 1941 right before World War II, it was another of the structural casualties of the War, heavily damaged (but still intact) by bombardment during the Battle and subsequent Liberation of Manila in February 1945. With the aid of the United States Army, Philippine Commonwealth Army and the city government, City Hall was reconstructed, though did not follow the original plans. Among the deviations were an added fifth-floor attic from the south entrance until the location of the east–west side entrances to accommodate additional offices, and additional windows in some areas which were formerly shelling damages.

The National Museum of the Philippines declared the Manila City Hall as an Important Cultural Property on June 27, 2019. A marker for the declaration by the National Historical Commission of the Philippines was unveiled on September 18, 2023 at the Manila City Hall grounds.

== Architecture ==
Antonio Manalac Toledo was the architect responsible for the design of the current Manila City Hall which exhibits a Neoclassical style. Juan M. Arellano's design, which had an Art Deco style, was supposed to be used for the city hall but Juan Arellano quit the project and was replaced by Antonio Manalac Toledo. Shortly after its construction, the city hall had a floor area of 8,422 square meters (90,650 sq ft) and had around 200 rooms.

The building sits on a trapezoidal shape of the lot in between the Legislative and Post Office buildings. Due to the monotony of the building envelope, one cannot distinguish the principal facade from the main entrance properly. The south entrance has a balcony emphasized by three arches resting on Corinthian columns while the north rear has the same design treatment with the east and west sides, but has pediments all throughout and a tall, octagonal clock tower capped by a dome.

=== Clock Tower ===
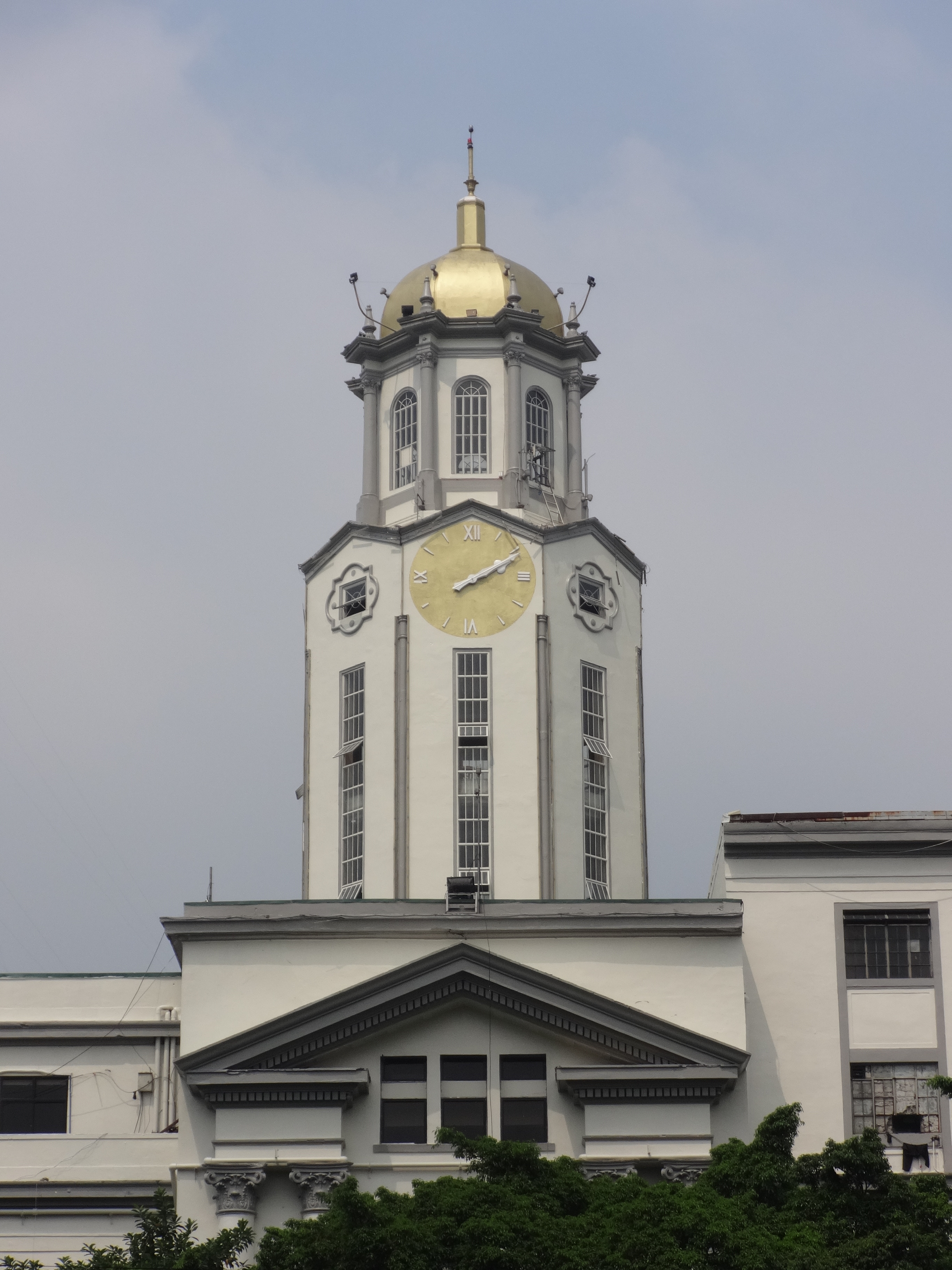
Manila City Hall Clock Tower

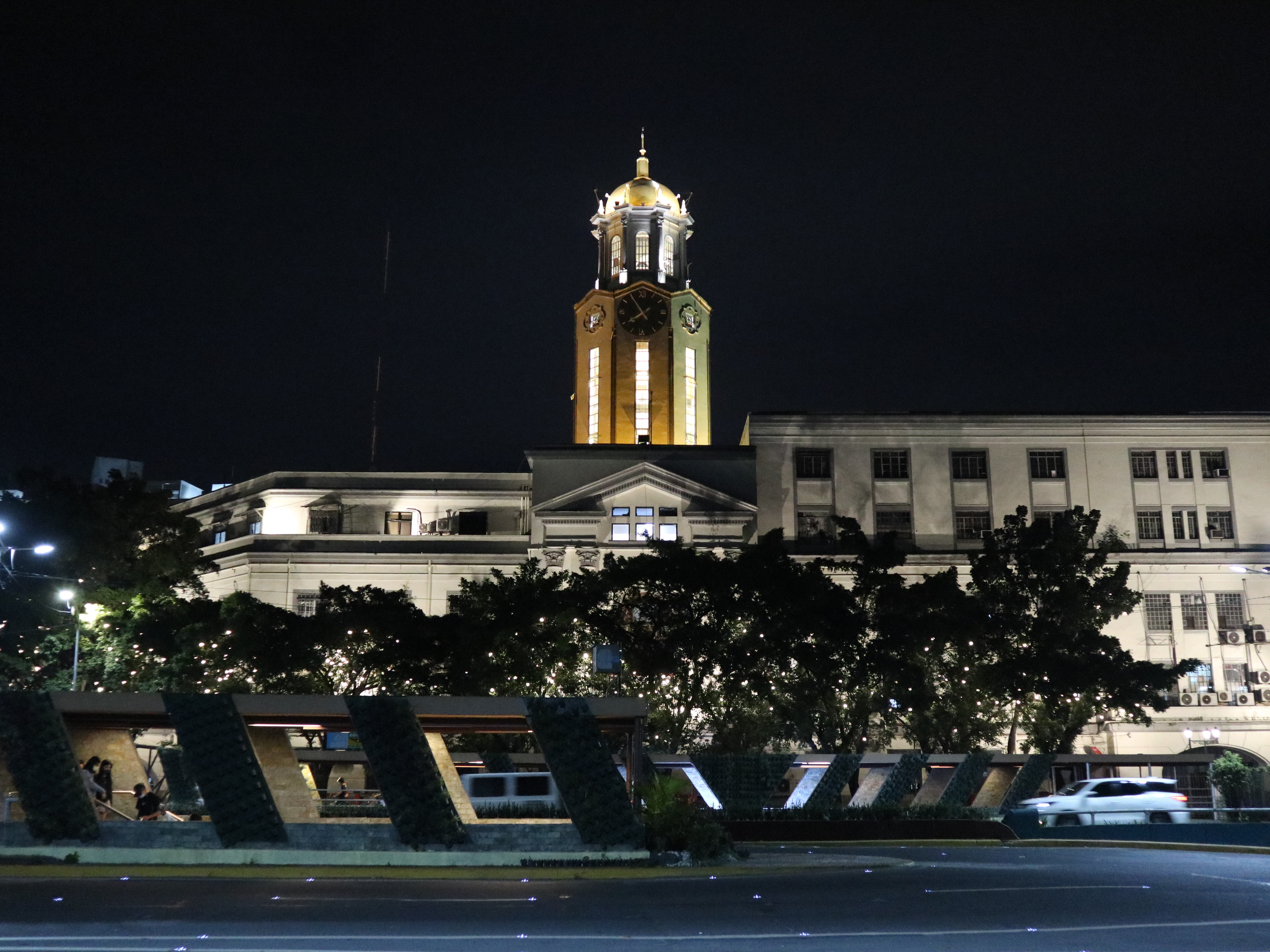
Manila City Hall at night

The clock tower, also designed by Antonio Manalac Toledo which was completed during the 1930s is the largest clock tower in the Philippines, reaching close to 100 feet (30 m) in elevation. It stands out during nighttime when the whole of the tower lights up. Every hour, they rung the bell three times continued by a melody. It has now become the icon for the city of Manila.

Renovation of the clock tower was first proposed by 6th district Councilor Lou Veloso in 1996. Renovation only started years later, during the time of Mayor Lito Atienza. The second time was after Joseph Estrada won in 2013. He had the clocks upgraded and digitalized so that it will always be synchronized with the Philippine Atmospheric, Geophysical and Astronomical Services Administration (PAGASA) for Philippine Standard Time. Under the Estrada administration, there were plans to establish a coffee shop in the clock tower and the first two floors of the tower had been turned into spacious halls. It was also adorned with LED lights that shifted colors. These were changed into stationary white light after Isko Moreno took over as Mayor in 2019.

In mid-2020, the portions of the clock tower in red, including the faces of its three clocks, were painted gold. Formerly a storage room, the interior was renovated to contain an art gallery, coffee shop, and a museum featuring an exhibit of historical events. It was opened to the public on December 27, 2021. It later became known as the Manila Clock Tower Museum and was formally inaugurated and declared as a prime tourist spot in June 2022.

== Proposal for a new city hall ==
In 2015, WTA Architecture + Design Studio envisions the Manila Arts and Cultural District centered around the Manila Metropolitan Theater, which was preparing to undertake its restoration works at that time. The proposed civic center calls for a New Manila City Hall, repurposing of the Park and Ride Building, a Central Park, an extension of the Manila City Library and the construction of a New Parking Building. Parts of the Old City Hall will be converted into a lifestyle mall with cafes and restaurants at the inner courtyard, while public transaction services will be moved to the ground floor.

During the campaign period for the 2019 local elections, mayoral candidate Isko Moreno promised to build a new City Hall beside the current City Hall should he win the mayoralty race. He pointed out that the current City Hall cannot accommodate anymore additional office space or traffic. In his proposal, the current City Hall will be maintained but will be converted to other uses. After winning the election, Moreno joined President Rodrigo Duterte’s delegation for four days in Tokyo, Japan for prospective investors in order to boost his 10-year Infrastructure Plan for Manila which includes the construction of the New City Hall, among others.
