= Cuartel de Santa Lucia =

Coordinates: 14°35′18.2″N 120°58′25.4″E

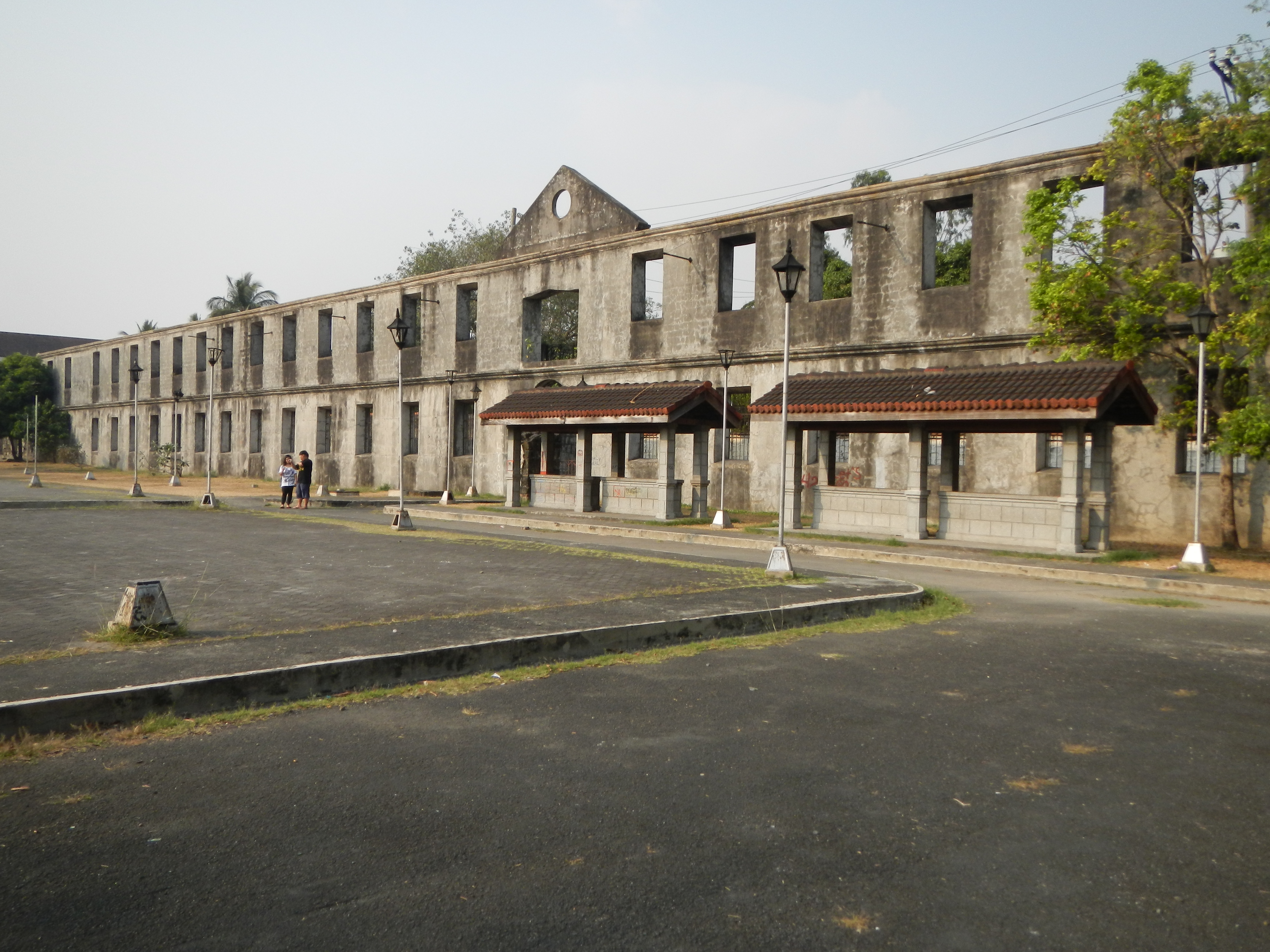
- Cuartel de Santa Lucia in Intramuros
- Interactive map of the Cuartel de Santa Lucia area

General information
- Status: Ruins
- Location: Intramuros, Manila, Philippines

Cuartel de Santa Lucia is a ruined building in Intramuros, Manila, the Philippines.

It was constructed for the Artillería de Montaña in 1781 following the plans of Tomas Sanz. Its construction was executed during the governorship of José Basco y Vargas. In 1901, the Philippine Constabulary used the buildings as its headquarters. In 1905, it was opened as a military school, or the Philippine Military Academy in Baguio at present. The building turned into ruins during World War II, thus, the remaining walls were reconstructed by the Philippine Constabulary. The interior was never rebuilt and is being converted into a park.

== Existing structures within the vicinity ==
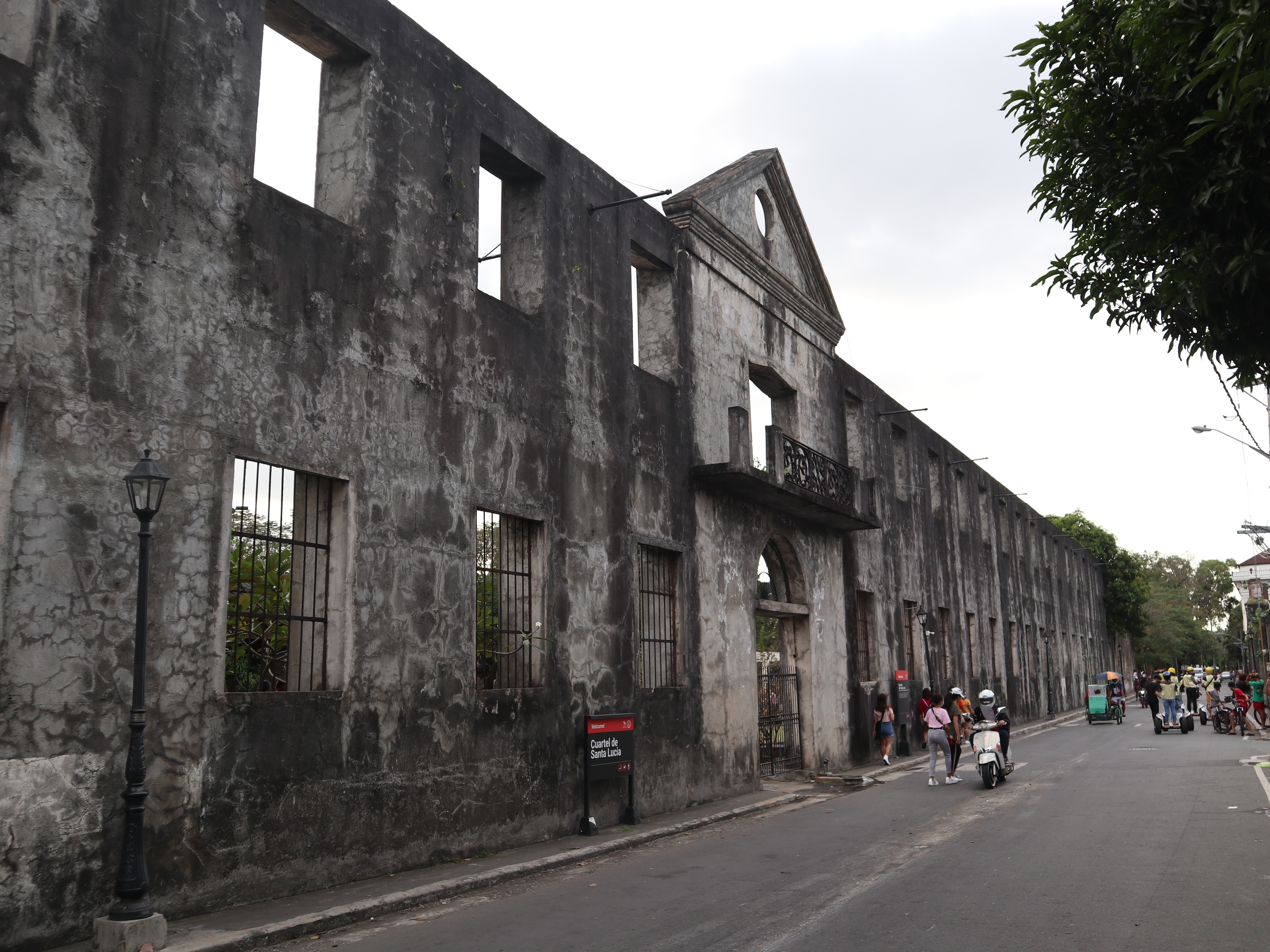
Cuartel de Santa Lucia in 2021.

The barracks were located near the Santa Lucia Gate and beside the Beaterio de la Compañía.

=== Santa Lucia Gate ===
The Santa Lucia Gate, or Puerta de Santa Lucia, was built at the end of Calle Real del Parian. It also served as the principal egress going to the seashore. It was built by Governor General Jose Basco y Vargas from 1778 up to 1787 during the reign of King Carlos III. The planning for the construction of the gate started in 1781, and was completed circa 1791, drawn by Brambila. Santa Lucia Gate was demolished by American tanks in 1945 and was rebuilt in 1968 by the Intramuros Restoration Committee, in accordance to the original plans archived from Spain.

=== Beaterio de la Compañia ===
Founded by Ignacia del Espíritu Santo, a mestiza Chinese from Binondo, the beaterio housed the beatas, lay sisters dedicated to prayer and charitable work. By the 19th century, the Beatas had a residence along Calle Santa Lucia. The Beaterio was simple structure of mortar. Its main entrance was through an arched portal, which led to a large hall; the wings to the left for the residences. The windows were composed of simple rectangles. The Beatas de la Compañia which was housed in this building is a Rome recognized religious congregation in 1948.

The beaterio's site is now occupied by Intramuros' Light and Sound Museum.

== Present condition ==
Cuartel de Santa Lucia has been in ruins since World War II.

=== Marker from the National Historical Commission of the Philippines ===
The marker of Cuartel de Santa Lucia was installed on August 4, 1990, at Intramuros, Manila. It was installed by the National Historical Institute.

Cuartel de Santa Lucia
ON THIS SITE, CUARTEL DE LA ARTILLERIA DE MONTANA WAS BUILT BY THOMAS SANZ, ENGINEER OF THE ARMY DURING THE ADMINISTRATION OF GOVERNOR GENERAL JOSE BASCO Y VARGAS, 1781. USED AS BARRACKS BY THE PHILIPPINE CONSTABULARY, 1901. BECAME THE PHILIPPINE OFFICERS SCHOOL, FEBRUARY 17,1905. HERE, THE NEWLY APPOINTED CONSTABULARY OFFICERS, STUDIED A THREE-MONTH COURSE OF INSTRUCTION IN LAW AND SPANISH LANGUAGE IN ADDITION TO MILITARY DRILL AND CONSTABULARY ADMINISTRATION TRANSFERRED TO BAGUIO CITY, 1908. DESTROYED DURING WORLD WAR II AND FROM THE REMAINING WALLS, THE PHILIPPINE CONSTABULARY RECONSTRUCTED THIS BARRACKS.
