= Club Intramuros Golf Course =

Golf course in Manila, Philippines

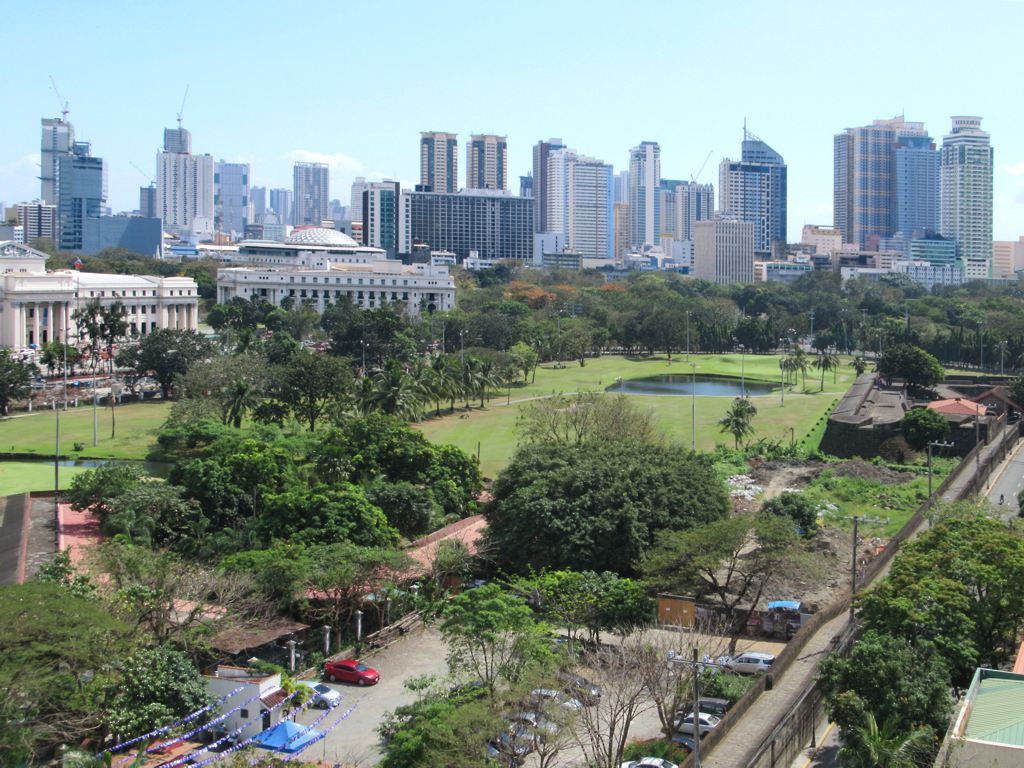
- Interactive map of Club Intramuros Golf Course
- 14°35′24″N 120°58′20″E

Club information
- Location: Manila, Philippines
- Operator: Tourism Infrastructure and Enterprise Zone Authority
- Tota holes: 18
- Website: clubintramurosgolfcourse.com
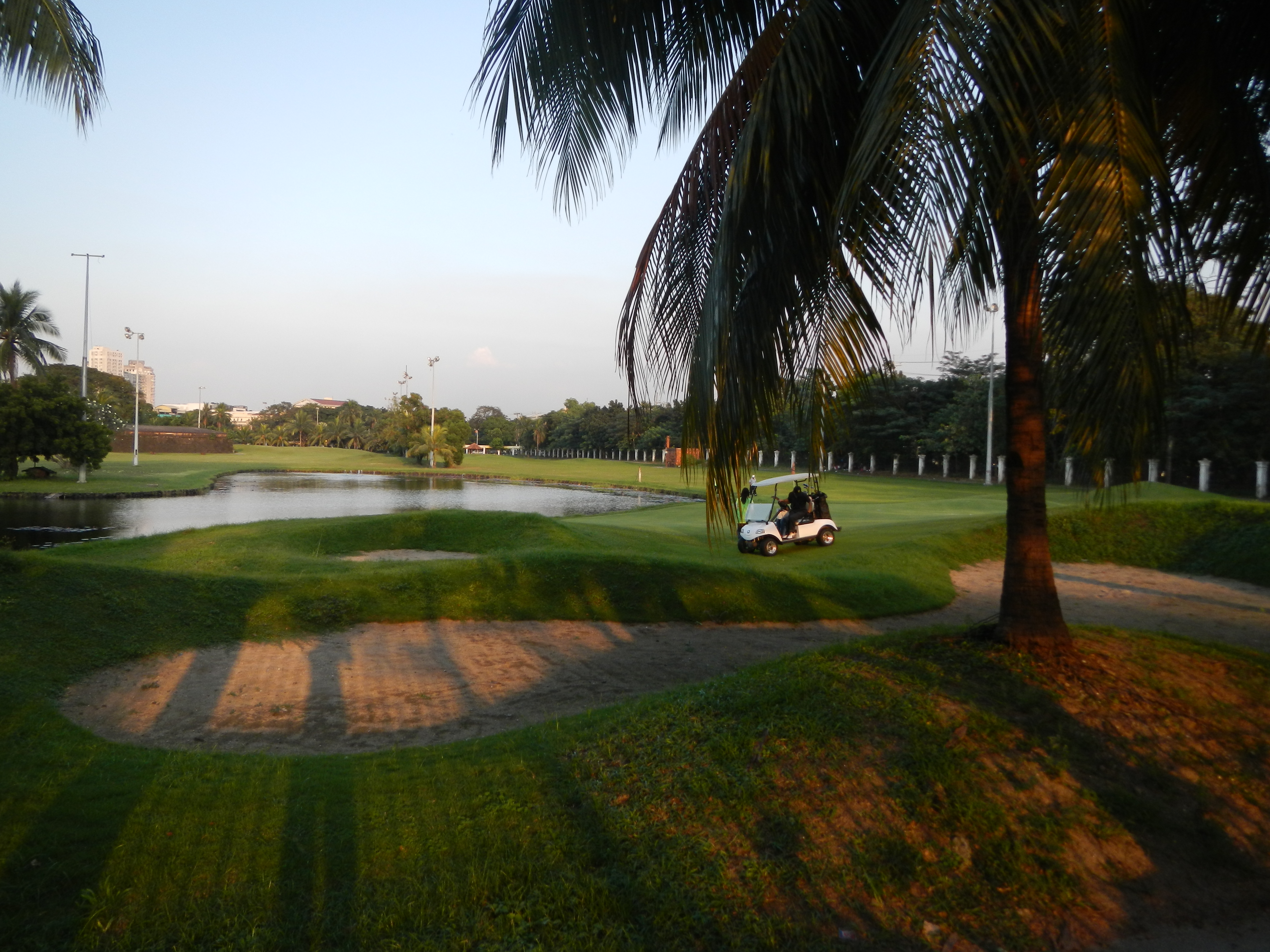

The Club Intramuros Golf Course is a golf course situated on the periphery of the walled area of Intramuros in Manila, Philippines. It is one of the oldest golf courses in the Philippines.

== History ==
The Club Intramuros Golf Course's location used to be a moat surrounding the walled area of Intramuros in Manila, which was converted into a sunken garden before being repurposed as a golf course during the American colonial era. The golf club behind the course, Club Intramuros was established in the early 1990s. The course started as a nine-hole course, initially known as the Manila Municipal Golf Links.

In the early 1930s, the Manila City Government assumed management of the course and the Intramuros golfing venue was expanded into a full 18-hole, 60 par course with a length of 3,896 yards (3,563 m). By the 1950s, a driving range already exists in the golf course and by the 1960s, the golf venue has been expanded to a 18-hole course.

The management and control of the Intramuros golf course was transferred to the Philippine Tourism Authority (now Tourism Infrastructure and Enterprise Zone Authority) in 1981 during the administration of Philippine President Ferdinand Marcos. Golf architect Andy Dye was tasked to lead renovation works on the Intramuros golf course during the administration of Philippine President Fidel V. Ramos.

In 2018, the Tourism Infrastructure and Enterprise Zone Authority started renovation works on the golf course.

== Proposed conversion ==
In 2025, the Manila City Government proposed the conversion of the golf course into a public forest park, to be known as the Intramuros Forest Park. According to Manila Mayor Isko Moreno, the conversion's purpose is to provide an additional green space in the city for public benefit, citing the golf course's underutilization.
