= Port Area, Manila =

District of Manila, Metro Manila, Philippines

Port Area Port District South Port District
- District of Manila
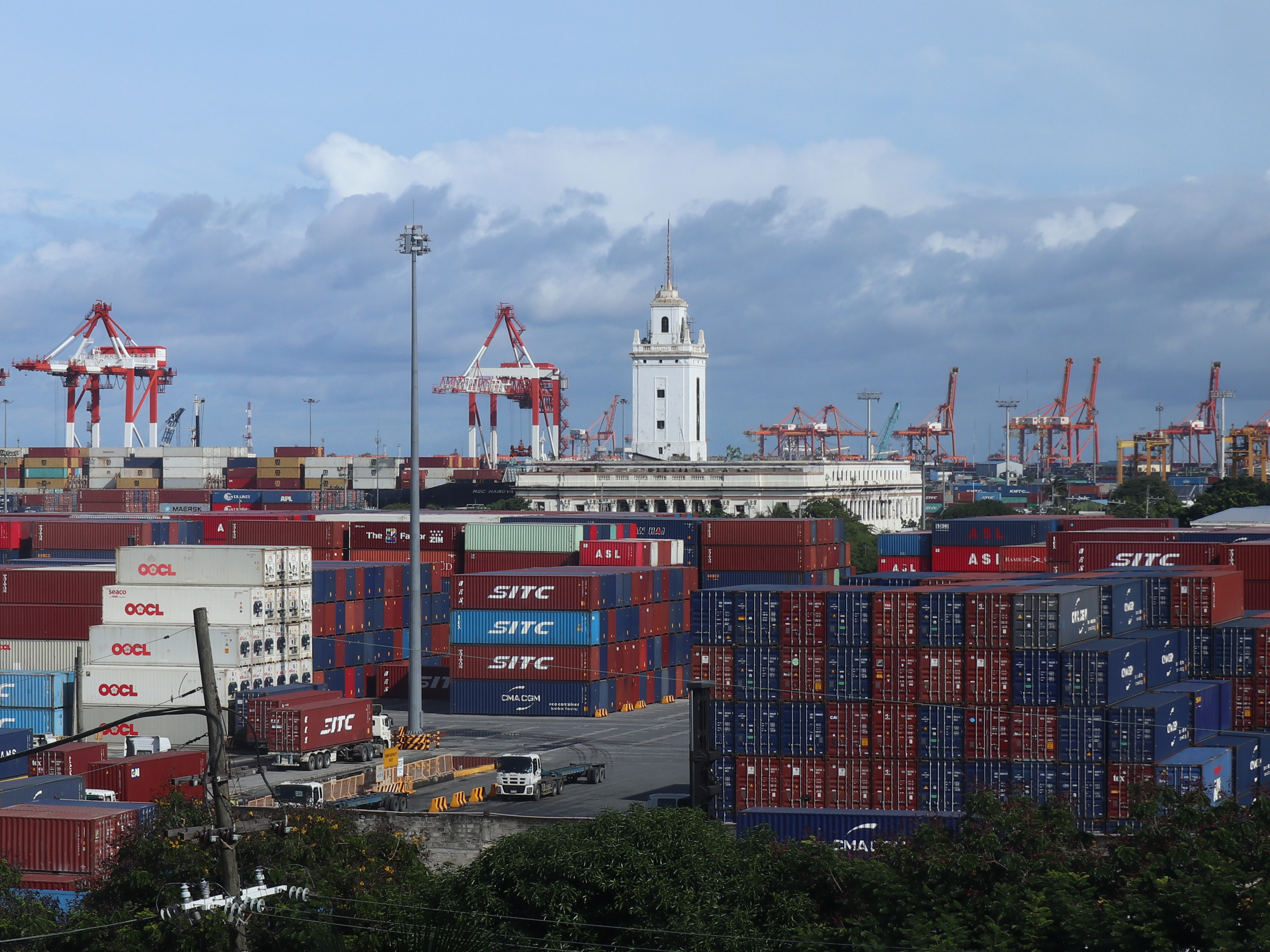
- Manila South Harbor with the Bureau of Customs building in the center

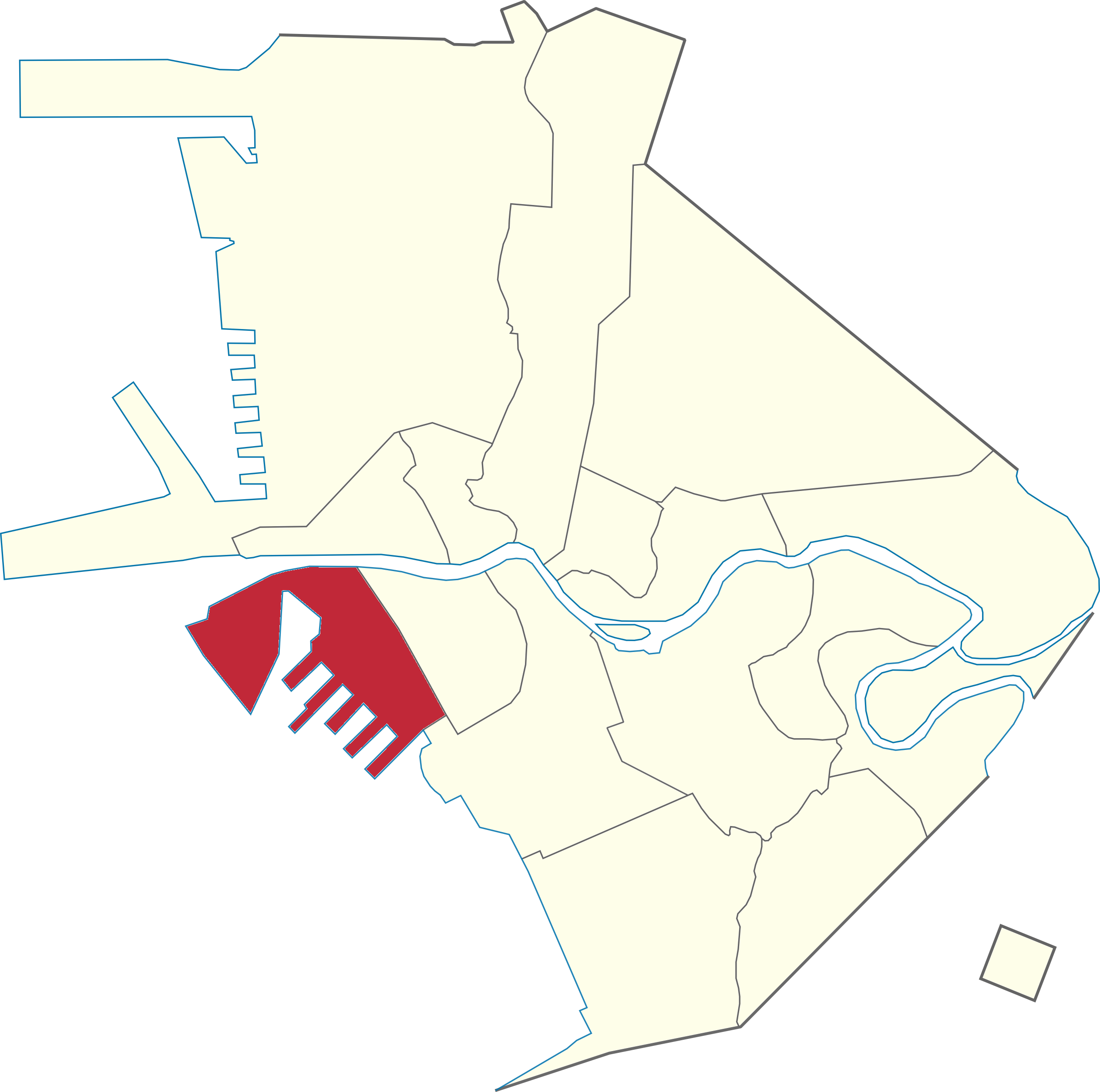
- Map of Manila showing the location of Port Area
- Coordinates: 14.588726°N 120.968597°E
- Country: Philippines
- Region: National Capital Region
- City: Manila
- District: Part of the 5th district of Manila
- Barangays: 5

Area
  - Total: 3.1528 km^{2} (1.2173 sq mi)

Population (2020)
  - Total: 72,605
  - Density: 23,029/km^{2} (59,644/sq mi)
- Time zone: UTC+08:00 (Philippine Standard Time)
- ZIP code: 1018 (Port Area South)
- Area code: 2

Port Area, also known as the Manila Port District and South Port District, is a district of the city of Manila, Philippines. It is entirely a reclaimed land occupied by Manila's South Harbor and Baseco Compound (Engineer's Island). It is bounded on the north by the Pasig River, facing the districts of Tondo and San Nicolas, on the west by Manila Bay, on the east by Intramuros, separated by Radial Road 1, and on the south by Ermita. Post-war developments at the Manila South Harbor eventually paved the way for the migration of natives from the different provinces, making it one of the largest ghettos in the Philippines.

== History ==
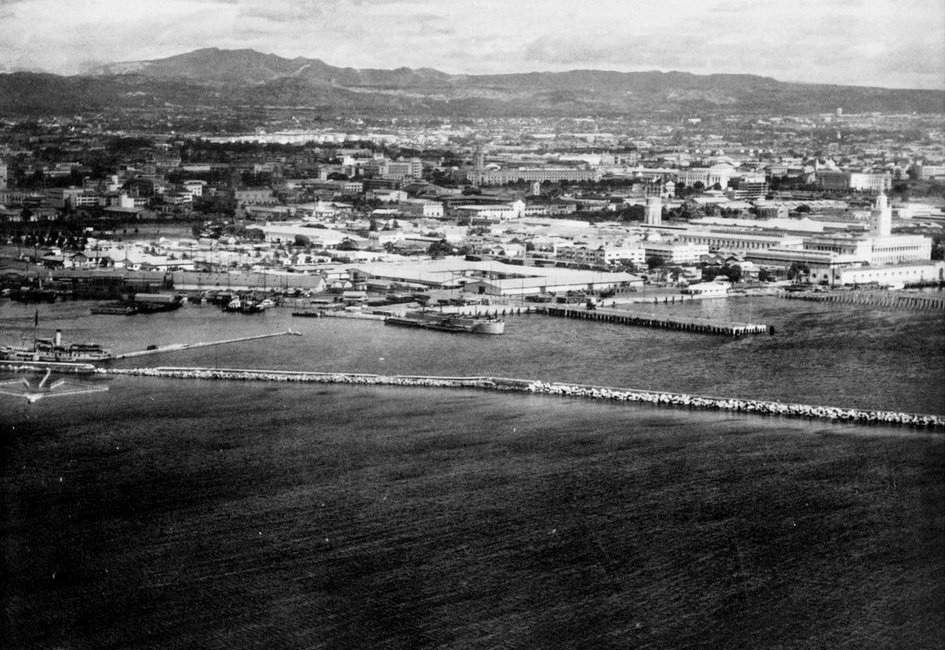
Port Area in May 1958

Port Area, historically known as Port District, was built on reclaimed land in the 1890s, toward the end of the Spanish rule, as an expansion of the Port of Manila. In 1914, administrative oversight of the district was transferred to the Insular Collector of Customs (now Bureau of Customs). Subsequently, in 1949, revisions to the Manila city charter resulted in the formal and explicit inclusion of Port Area as part of the newly established 4th district. It was later transferred to the 5th district in 1987, following the restoration of the bicameral Congress.

In the late 1970s, the urban poor were resettled to Baseco Compound, originally a dockyard of the National Shipyard and Steel Corporation (NASSCO), a Government-owned and controlled corporation (GOCC) that was acquired by the Romualdez family in 1966, to make space for a potential international seaport. Baseco was declared a barangay in the 1980s. Following the 1986 People Power Revolution, the property was sequestered, leading to further resettlement and its proclamation as a residential site in 2002.

== Barangays ==
The district of Port Area is made up of 5 barangays, numbered 649 to 653. Barangay 649 contains the Engineer's Island, now informally known as the Baseco Compound. The Island is regarded as one of the biggest urban poor communities in the Philippines.

The central offices of the Department of Public Works and Highways, Philippine Ports Authority, Philippine Coast Guard are located in the territorial jurisdiction of Barangays 652 or 653.

All barangays of Port Area belong to Zone 68 of the City of Manila.

Barangay	Land area	Population (2020)
Barangay 649	1.102 km^{2}	64,750
Barangay 650	0.1059 km^{2}	5,202
Barangay 651	0.1738 km^{2}	2,556
Barangay 652	0.09513 km^{2}	39
Barangay 653	0.2958 km^{2}	58
