= List of Cultural Properties of the Philippines in Metro Manila =

This list contains an overview of the government recognized Cultural Properties of the Philippines in Metro Manila. The list is based on the official lists provided by the National Commission on Culture and the Arts, National Historical Commission of the Philippines and the National Museum of the Philippines.

Cultural Property wmph identifier (Note: wmph is an internal identifier used by Wikimedia Philippines to identify the monument. This is not an official identifier, and only shown temporarily in the templates until the government creates an updated complete list.)	Site name	Description	City or municipality	Address	Coordinates	Image
PH-00-0001	Bonifacio Monument	Monument dedicated to the lifework of Andres Bonifacio. 45 foot pylon with at the top a figure representing Victory. Designed by Guillermo Tolentino.	Caloocan	Monumento Circle, Epifanio de los Santos Avenue corner Rizal Avenue	14°39′26″N 120°59′03″E	Upload file
PH-00-0002	Las Piñas Church		Las Piñas	Father Diego Cera Avenue	14°28′52″N 120°58′53″E	Upload file
PH-00-0003	Las Piñas Bamboo Organ		Las Piñas	Las Piñas Church, Father Diego Cera Avenue	14°28′52″N 120°58′53″E	Upload file
PH-00-0004	Bank of the Philippine Islands Building		Makati	6768 Ayala Avenue corner Paseo de Roxas, San Lorenzo	14°33′24″N 121°01′16″E	Upload Photo
PH-00-0005	Ayala y Compañía		Makati	Ayala Tower One, 6767 Ayala Avenue corner Paseo de Roxas, Bel-Air Village		Upload file
PH-00-0006	Elizalde y Compañia (Sucesores de Ynchausti y Compañia)		Makati	Elizalde Building, Ayala Avenue		Upload Photo
PH-00-0007	Guadalupe Church and Monastery		Makati	7440 Bernardino Street, Guadalupe Viejo	14°33′57″N 121°02′35″E	Upload file
PH-00-0008	Philippine Bar Association		Makati	Suite 347 Valero Plaza, 124 Valero Street, Salcedo Village		Upload Photo
PH-00-0009	Smith, Bell & Co., Inc.		Makati	Manila Polo Club, McKinley Road, Forbes Park		Upload Photo
PH-00-0010	Philippine Dental Association		Makati	PDA Building, Ayala Avenue corner Kamagong Street, San Antonio		Upload file
PH-00-0011	San Pedro de Makati Church		Makati	5539 D.M. Rivera Street, Poblacion	14°33′58″N 121°01′53″E	Upload file
PH-00-0012	Concepcion Church		Malabon	General Luna corner Escanilla Streets, Concepcion		Upload file
PH-00-0013	San Bartolome Church		Malabon	Rizal Avenue Extension, San Agustin		Upload file
PH-00-0014	Carmelo and Bauermann, Inc.		Mandaluyong	Epifanio de los Santos Avenue		Upload Photo
PH-00-0015	Jose P. Laurel Residence		Mandaluyong	Villa Pacencia, Shaw Boulevard corner S. Laurel Street, Addition Hills	14°35′17″N 121°02′43″E	Upload file
PH-00-0016	Andres Bonifacio National Shrine		Manila	Mehan Garden, Ermita		Upload Photo
PH-00-0017	Andres Bonifacio Monument		Manila	Padre Burgos Avenue corner Natividad Almeda-Lopez Street, Ermita		Upload Photo
PH-00-0018	Elks Club Building		Manila	Roxas Boulevard, Ermita		Upload file
PH-00-0019	Luneta Hotel		Manila	414 Kalaw Avenue cor. Alhambra St., Ermita	14°34′48″N 120°58′41″E	Upload file
PH-00-0020	Manila Hotel		Manila	One Rizal Park, Bonifacio Drive, Port Area		Upload file
PH-00-0021	Mehan Garden		Manila	Padre Burgos Avenue, Ermita		Upload file
PH-00-0022	Manila Metropolitan Theater		Manila	Liwasang Bonifacio, Padre Burgos Avenue, Ermita	14°35′39″N 120°58′50″E	Upload file
PH-00-0023	Rizal Monument		Manila	Rizal Park, Ermita	14°34′54″N 120°58′36″E	Upload file
PH-00-0024	Rizal Park		Manila	Ermita	14°34′57″N 120°58′42″E	Upload file
PH-00-0025	Intramuros and its Walls		Manila	Intramuros	14°35′00″N 120°59′00″E	Upload file
PH-00-0026	Rizal Shrine		Manila	Fort Santiago, Intramuros	14°35′40″N 120°58′11″E	Upload file
PH-00-0027	San Agustin Church		Manila	General Luna Street, Intramuros	14°35′20″N 120°58′31″E	Upload file
PH-00-0028	Fort Santiago Freedom Shrine (Dambana ng Kalayaan)		Manila	Fort Santiago, Intramuros		Upload file
PH-00-0029	Mabini Shrine		Manila	PUP–Manila Campus, Anonas Street, Santa Mesa	14°35′53″N 121°00′40″E	Upload file
PH-00-0030	Plaza Zamora		Manila	T. San Luis Street, Pandacan		Upload Photo
PH-00-0031	Nakpil-Bautista House		Manila	432 A. Bautista Street, Quiapo	14°35′54″N 120°59′05″E	Upload file
PH-00-0032	Basilica of San Sebastian		Manila	Plaza del Carmen, Quiapo	14°35′59″N 120°59′21″E	Upload file
PH-00-0033	University of Santo Tomas Main Building and Arch of the Centuries		Manila	España Boulevard, Sampaloc	14°36′37″N 120°59′21″E	Upload file
PH-00-0034	Antonio Luna Birthplace		Manila	457 Urbiztondo Street, San Nicolas		Upload Photo
PH-00-0035	Lichauco Heritage House		Manila	Pedro Gil Street, Santa Ana	14°34′53″N 121°00′39″E	Upload file
PH-00-0036	Mausoleo de los Veteranos de la Revolución		Manila	Manila North Cemetery, Santa Cruz		Upload file
PH-00-0037	Residence of Rizal's Family		Manila	526 Magdalena Street, Binondo		Upload Photo
PH-00-0038	Banco de las Islas Filipinas		Manila	4 Plaza Cervantes, Binondo		Upload file
PH-00-0039	Binondo Church		Manila	Plaza San Lorenzo Ruiz, Binondo	14°36′00″N 120°58′28″E	Upload file
PH-00-0040	Higino Francisco Residence		Manila	525 Magdalena Street, Binondo		Upload file
PH-00-0041	Peele, Hubbel & Co.		Manila	Recto Avenue, Binondo		Upload Photo
PH-00-0042	House where Rizal's Father Died		Manila	619 Estraude Street, Binondo		Upload Photo
PH-00-0043	The Insular Life Assurance Company		Manila	Recto Avenue, Binondo		Upload Photo
PH-00-0044	Adamson University		Manila	San Marcelino Street, Ermita	14°35′13″N 120°59′09″E	Upload file
PH-00-0045	Araullo High School		Manila	Taft Avenue corner United Nations Avenue, Ermita	14°35′00″N 120°59′06″E	Upload file
PH-00-0046	Army and Navy Club Building		Manila	Roxas Boulevard, Ermita		Upload file
PH-00-0047	Asociación Feminista Filipina (Philippine Feminist Association)		Manila	962 Josefa Llanes-Escoda Street, Ermita		Upload Photo
PH-00-0048	Boy Scouts of the Philippines		Manila	181 Natividad Almeda-Lopez Street, Ermita		Upload Photo
PH-00-0049	Canon at the South Side of the Legislative Building		Manila	Ermita		Upload Photo
PH-00-0050	Casino Español de Manila		Manila	Kalaw Avenue, Ermita	14°35′03″N 120°59′06″E	Upload file
PH-00-0051	Central United Methodist Church		Manila	649 Kalaw Avenue, Ermita	14°34′58″N 120°59′01″E	Upload file
PH-00-0052	Compañía General de Tabacos de Filipinas		Manila	Romualdez Street, Ermita		Upload Photo
PH-00-0053	Cosmopolitan Church		Manila	1368 Taft Avenue, Ermita		Upload file
PH-00-0054	Ermita Church (Nuestra Señora de Guia)		Manila	Mabini Street, Ermita		Upload file
PH-00-0055	Ermita Science Community		Manila	Pedro Gil Street, Ermita		Upload Photo
PH-00-0056	Girl Scouts of the Philippines		Manila	Padre Faura Street, Ermita		Upload file
PH-00-0057	Grand Lodge of Free and Accepted Masons of the Philippines		Manila	San Marcelino Street, Ermita		Upload Photo
PH-00-0058	Harris Memorial College		Manila	Taft Avenue, Ermita		Upload Photo
PH-00-0059	League of Women Voters of the Philippines, Inc. (LWVP)		Manila	Old Legislative Building, Taft Avenue corner Padre Burgos Avenue, Ermita		Upload Photo
PH-00-0060	Manila City Hall		Manila	Padre Burgos Avenue, Ermita		More images
PH-00-0061	Manuel G. Araullo Monument		Manila	Araullo High School, Taft Avenue corner United Nations Avenue, Ermita		Upload file
PH-00-0062	Military Hospital of Manila Sternberg Hospital		Manila	Ermita		Upload Photo
PH-00-0063	National Archives		Manila	Kalaw Avenue, Ermita		Upload file
PH-00-0064	National Library		Manila	Kalaw Avenue, Ermita		Upload file
PH-00-0065	National Museum (Old Legislative Building)		Manila	Padre Burgos Avenue, Ermita		Upload file
PH-00-0066	Philippine General Hospital		Manila	Taft Avenue, Ermita		Upload file
PH-00-0067	Philippine Red Cross		Manila	United Nations Avenue corner Taft Avenue, Ermita		Upload Photo
PH-00-0068	Philippine Normal University		Manila	Taft Avenue, Ermita		Upload file
PH-00-0069	Philippine Pharmaceutical Association		Manila	Mehan Garden beside Metropolitan Theater, Ermita		Upload Photo
PH-00-0070	Philippine Post Office		Manila	Liwasang Bonifacio, Ermita		Upload file
PH-00-0071	Philippine School of Arts and Trades		Manila	Ayala Boulevard, Ermita		Upload file
PH-00-0072	Plaza Olivia Salamanca		Manila	Taft Avenue corner Kalaw Avenue, Ermita		Upload file
PH-00-0073	Rizal Fountain		Manila	Noli Me Tangere Garden, Rizal Park, Ermita		Upload Photo
PH-00-0074	Rotary Club of Manila		Manila	Manila Hotel, Port Area		Upload Photo
PH-00-0075	San Vicente de Paul Church		Manila	San Marcelino Street, Ermita		Upload file
PH-00-0076	Santa Isabel College Manila		Manila	Taft Avenue, Ermita		Upload file
PH-00-0077	Senate Markers		Manila	Padre Burgos Avenue, Ermita		Upload Photo
PH-00-0078	Site of First Congress of the Philippines		Manila	Rizal Park Flagpole, Ermita		Upload Photo
PH-00-0079	Site of San Juan de Bagumbayan Church and Convent		Manila	Ermita		Upload file
PH-00-0080	Technological University of the Philippines		Manila	Ayala Boulevard, Ermita		Upload file
PH-00-0081	United Nations Plaza		Manila	United Nations Avenue, Ermita		Upload Photo
PH-00-0082	United States Embassy Chancery		Manila	US Embassy, Roxas Boulevard, Ermita		Upload file
PH-00-0083	University of the Philippines College of Medicine		Manila	Pedro Gil Street, Ermita		Upload file
PH-00-0084	Young Men’s Christian Association		Manila	350 Mayor Antonio J. Villegas Road, Ermita		Upload Photo
PH-00-0085	Ang Akwaryum		Manila	General Luna Street, Intramuros		Upload Photo
PH-00-0086	Archconfraternity of Nuestra Señora de Aranzasu		Manila	Muralla Street, Intramuros		Upload file
PH-00-0087	Ayuntamiento de Manila (Casas Consistoriales)		Manila	Aduana Street, Intramuros		Upload file
PH-00-0088	Cuartel de Santa Lucia (Santa Lucia Barracks)		Manila	Santa Lucia Street, Intramuros		Upload file
PH-00-0089	Dambana ng Kalayaan		Manila	Fort Santiago, Intramuros		Upload Photo
PH-00-0090	Daughters of Charity		Manila	CBCP Headquarters, General Luna Street, Intramuros		Upload Photo
PH-00-0091	Fort Santiago		Manila	Intramuros		Upload file
PH-00-0092	Aduana Building (Intendencia Building)		Manila	Aduana corner Muralla Streets, Intramuros		Upload file
PH-00-0093	Jose Rizal Prison Cell		Manila	Rizal Shrine, Fort Santiago, Intramuros		Upload file
PH-00-0094	Manila Mint Ruins		Manila	Aduana corner Muralla Streets, Intramuros		Upload file
PH-00-0095	Order of the Knights of Rizal		Manila	Bonifacio Drive, Port Area		Upload Photo
PH-00-0096	Philippine Law School		Manila	Real Street corner Magallanes Drive, Intramuros		Upload Photo
PH-00-0097	Puerta de Isabela II		Manila	Magallanes Drive, Intramuros		Upload file
PH-00-0098	Puerta de Postigo		Manila	Postigo corner Arzobispo Streets, Intramuros		Upload file
PH-00-0099	Puerta de Sta. Lucia		Manila	Bonifacio Drive, Intramuros		Upload file
PH-00-0100	Araullo High School		Manila	Intramuros		Upload Photo
PH-00-0101	Ateneo de Manila Site		Manila	Arzobispo Street, Intramuros		Upload file
PH-00-0102	Bastion de San Andres or San Nicolas		Manila	Muralla Street, Intramuros		Upload file
PH-00-0103	Bastion de San Diego		Manila	Santa Lucia corner Muralla Streets, Intramuros		Upload file
PH-00-0104	Beaterio		Manila	Intramuros		Upload Photo
PH-00-0105	Santa Catalina College and Beaterio		Manila	Beaterio Street, Intramuros		Upload Photo
PH-00-0106	Boys’ Singing School		Manila	Intramuros		Upload Photo
PH-00-0107	Church of the Third Order of the Franciscans		Manila	Muralla Street, Intramuros		Upload Photo
PH-00-0108	Colegio de San Juan de Letran		Manila	151 Muralla Street, Intramuros		Upload file
PH-00-0109	Colegio de Santa Rosa		Manila	Santo Tomas Street, Intramuros		Upload file
PH-00-0110	Father Burgos’ Residence		Manila	Cabildo Street, Intramuros		Upload Photo
PH-00-0111	Former Military Chapel		Manila	Intramuros		Upload Photo
PH-00-0112	Franciscan Church		Manila	Intramuros		Upload Photo
PH-00-0113	Pamantasan ng Lungsod ng Maynila Inscription		Manila	General Luna corner Muralla Streets, Intramuros		Upload file
PH-00-0114	Jesuit Church of San Ignacio		Manila	Arzobispo Street, Intramuros		Upload file
PH-00-0115	College and Seminary of San Jose		Manila	Muralla Street, Intramuros		Upload Photo
PH-00-0116	Manila Cathedral		Manila	Santo Tomas Street, Intramuros		More images
PH-00-0117	Manila High School		Manila	Victoria corner Muralla Streets, Intramuros		Upload file
PH-00-0118	National Press Club		Manila	Magallanes Drive, Intramuros		Upload file
PH-00-0119	Plaza McKinley		Manila	Andres Soriano, Jr. Avenue, Intramuros		Upload file
PH-00-0120	Powder Magazine		Manila	Intramuros		Upload Photo
PH-00-0121	Puerta de Parian		Manila	Muralla Street, Intramuros		Upload file
PH-00-0122	Puerta Real		Manila	Muralla Street, Intramuros		Upload file
PH-00-0123	Recoletos Church and Convent		Manila	Recoletos corner Muralla Streets, Intramuros		Upload file
PH-00-0124	Santa Clara Convent		Manila	Intramuros		Upload Photo
PH-00-0125	Santa Potenciana College		Manila	Intramuros		Upload file
PH-00-0126	Santa Rosa Beaterio and College for Girls		Manila	Intramuros		Upload file
PH-00-0127	Santisimo Rosario College		Manila	Intramuros		Upload Photo
PH-00-0128	Tenaza Real Santiago		Manila	Intramuros		Upload Photo
PH-00-0129	Chapel of the Crucified Christ		Manila	St. Paul University Manila, Pedro Gil Street, Malate		Upload file
PH-00-0130	Ellinwood Malate Church		Manila	Dr. Antonio Vasquez Street, Malate		Upload Photo
PH-00-0131	Fort San Antonio Abad		Manila	Central Bank Complex, Malate		Upload file
PH-00-0132	Malate Church		Manila	Marcelo H. del Pilar Street, Malate		Upload file
PH-00-0133	Orosa Memorial Building		Manila	Malate		Upload Photo
PH-00-0134	Philippine Women's University		Manila	Taft Avenue, Malate		Upload file
PH-00-0135	Scottish Free Masonry		Manila	1828 Taft Avenue, Malate		Upload Photo
PH-00-0136	St. Cecilia’s Hall		Manila	St. Scholastica's College Manila, Leon Guinto Street, Malate		Upload Photo
PH-00-0137	Asociación de Damas de Filipinas		Manila	Quirino Avenue, Paco		Upload file
PH-00-0138	Concordia College		Manila	Pedro Gil Street, Paco		Upload file
PH-00-0139	Looban College		Manila	United Nations Avenue, Paco		Upload Photo
PH-00-0140	Paco Cemetery		Manila	San Marcelino Street, Paco		Upload file
PH-00-0141	Paco Church		Manila	Paz Street, Paco		Upload file
PH-00-0142	Philippine Columbian Association		Manila	PCA Complex, Plaza Dilao, Paco		Upload file
PH-00-0143	Jose P. Laurel House		Manila	Peñafrancia corner Santo Sepulcro Streets, Paco		Upload file
PH-00-0144	Mabini Bridge		Manila	Nagtahan Bridge site, Pandacan		Upload file
PH-00-0145	Pandacan Church		Manila	Jesus Street, Pandacan		Upload file
PH-00-0146	Peñafrancia Church		Manila	Peñafrancia Street, Pandacan		Upload Photo
PH-00-0147	Bureau of Customs		Manila	Port Area		Upload file
PH-00-0148	Bureau of Quarantine		Manila	25th Street, Port Area		Upload file
PH-00-0149	Colegio Medico-Farmaceutico de Filipinas Inc.		Manila	Manila Hotel, Port Area		Upload Photo
PH-00-0150	Philippine Red Cross		Manila	11th Street corner Railroad Drive, Port Area		Upload Photo
PH-00-0151	Aserradora Mecánica de Tuason y San Pedro		Manila	Globo de Oro corner Gunao Streets, Quiapo		Upload Photo
PH-00-0152	Quiapo Church		Manila	Plaza Miranda, Quiapo		Upload file
PH-00-0153	Beaterio de Terciarias Agustinas Recoletas		Manila	Sta. Rita College, San Rafael Street, Sampaloc		Upload Photo
PH-00-0154	Paraninfo Hall (UST Museum's Main Gallery)		Manila	University of Santo Tomas, Sampaloc		Upload Photo
PH-00-0155	Colegio Medico-Farmaceutico de Filipinas		Manila	Lepanto Street, Sampaloc		Upload Photo
PH-00-0156	Litografia e Imprenta de Cacho Hernianos		Manila	Legarda Street, Sampaloc		Upload Photo
PH-00-0157	National University		Manila	Mariano F. Jhocson Street, Sampaloc		Upload file
PH-00-0158	Paaralang Legarda		Manila	Lealtad Street, Sampaloc		Upload file
PH-00-0159	Sampaloc Church		Manila	Bustillos Street, Sampaloc		Upload file
PH-00-0160	Santa Catalina College		Manila	Legarda Street, Sampaloc		Upload file
PH-00-0161	Santo Tomas Concentration Camp		Manila	University of Santo Tomas, Sampaloc		Upload file
PH-00-0162	University of Manila		Manila	Alejandro VI Street, Sampaloc		Upload file
PH-00-0163	Our Lady of Montserrat Abbey		Manila	San Beda College, Mendiola Street, San Miguel		Upload file
PH-00-0164	Centro Escolar University		Manila	Mendiola Street, San Miguel		Upload file
PH-00-0165	Fabrica de Cerveza de San Miguel		Manila	General Solano Street, San Miguel		Upload file
PH-00-0166	Goldenberg Mansion		Manila	General Solano Street, San Miguel		Upload file
PH-00-0167	Hospicio de San Jose		Manila	Isla de Convalescencia, San Miguel		Upload file
PH-00-0168	Kalayaan Hall		Manila	Malacañan Palace Compound, San Miguel		Upload file
PH-00-0169	Komisyon sa Wikang Filipino		Manila	Watson Building, Jose Laurel Street, San Miguel		Upload Photo
PH-00-0170	Malacañan Palace		Manila	Jose Laurel Street, San Miguel		Upload Photo
PH-00-0171	San Beda College		Manila	Mendiola Street, San Miguel		Upload file
PH-00-0172	San Miguel Church		Manila	Jose Laurel Street, San Miguel		Upload file
PH-00-0173	Pasig River Light (Farola)		Manila	Philippine Coast Guard Compound, San Nicolas		Upload file
PH-00-0174	La Ignaciana		Manila	Pedro Gil Street, Santa Ana		Upload Photo
PH-00-0175	Santa Ana Church		Manila	New Panaderos Street, Santa Ana		Upload file
PH-00-0176	Carriedo Fountain		Manila	Plaza Santa Cruz, Santa Cruz		Upload file
PH-00-0177	Knox United Methodist Church		Manila	Rizal Avenue corner Lope de Vega Street, Santa Cruz		Upload file
PH-00-0178	La Protección de la Infancia		Manila	Dr. Jose Fabella Memorial Hospital, Lope de Vega Street, Santa Cruz		Upload Photo
PH-00-0179	Manila College of Pharmacy		Manila	MCU Compound, Santa Cruz		Upload Photo
PH-00-0180	Manila Law College		Manila	641 Sales Street, Santa Cruz		Upload Photo
PH-00-0181	Monte de Piedad Savings Bank		Manila	Plaza Santa Cruz, Santa Cruz		Upload file
PH-00-0182	Don Roman Santos Building		Manila	Plaza Lacson, Santa Cruz		Upload file
PH-00-0183	San Lazaro Hospital		Manila	Rizal Avenue, Santa Cruz		Upload file
PH-00-0184	Santa Cruz Church		Manila	Plaza Santa Cruz, Santa Cruz		Upload file
PH-00-0185	Manila Grand Opera House		Manila	Rizal Avenue, Santa Cruz		Upload file
PH-00-0186	Philippine Tuberculosis Society		Manila	San Lazaro Street, Santa Cruz		Upload Photo
PH-00-0187	Department of Health		Manila	San Lazaro Compound, Rizal Avenue, Santa Cruz		Upload file
PH-00-0188	Mabini Shrine		Manila	Polytechnic University of the Philippines, Santa Mesa		Upload file
PH-00-0189	Polytechnic University of the Philippines		Manila	Anonas Street, Santa Mesa		Upload file
PH-00-0190	Presidential Coach		Manila	Tutuban Station, Tondo		Upload Photo
PH-00-0191	Iglesia Evangelica Metodista en las Islas Filipinas		Manila	IEMELIF Compound, Peñalosa Street, Tondo		Upload file
PH-00-0192	Liga Filipina		Manila	Recto Avenue, Tondo		Upload file
PH-00-0193	Manila Railroad Company		Manila	Recto Avenue, Tondo		Upload file
PH-00-0194	Mary Johnston Hospital		Manila	1221 Juan Nolasco Street, Tondo		Upload file
PH-00-0195	Tondo Church		Manila	600 L. Chacon Street, Tondo		Upload file
PH-00-0196	Nuestra Señora de los Desamparados Church		Marikina	Jose P. Rizal Street, Santa Elena		Upload file
PH-00-0197	Kapitan Moy Residence (First Shoe Factory in Marikina)		Marikina	Jose P. Rizal Street, Santa Elena		Upload file
PH-00-0198	Insular Life		Muntinlupa	Insular Life Drive, Filinvest Corporate City, Alabang		Upload Photo
PH-00-0199	New Bilibid Prison		Muntinlupa	General Paulino Santos Avenue, Poblacion		Upload file
PH-00-0200	Balmis Expedition		Muntinlupa	RITM, Corporate Avenue, Alabang		Upload Photo
PH-00-0201	United Methodist Church		Navotas	Mariano Naval corner S. Antonio Streets, Tangos		Upload Photo
PH-00-0202	San Nicolas Chapel		Parañaque	Kapitan Tinoy Street, La Huerta		Upload Photo
PH-00-0203	Parañaque Cathedral		Parañaque	E. Quirino Avenue, La Huerta		Upload file
PH-00-0204	Methodist Episcopal Church		Parañaque	E. Quirino Avenue, Tambo		Upload file
PH-00-0205	P. Burgos Elementary School		Pasay	P. Burgos Street, Barangay 60		Upload file
PH-00-0206	School for the Deaf and Blind		Pasay	Harrison Avenue, Barangay 73		Upload file
PH-00-0207	Manila Yacht Club		Pasay	Roxas Boulevard		Upload file
PH-00-0208	San Juan de Dios Hospital		Pasay	Roxas Boulevard, Barangay 76		Upload file
PH-00-0209	Eulogio “Amang” Rodriguez House		Pasay	Salud Street		Upload Photo
PH-00-0210	Colegio del Buen Consejo		Pasig	Antonio Luna Street, Malinao		Upload file
PH-00-0211	Colegio de Madres Agustinas		Pasig			Upload file
PH-00-0212	Rizal Monument		Pasig	Plaza Rizal, Dr. Sixto Antonio Avenue, Malinao		Upload file
PH-00-0213	Church of Pasig		Pasig	Plaza Rizal, Malinao		Upload file
PH-00-0214	Camp Crame		Quezon City	Camp Crame Flagpole, Bagong Lipunan ng Crame		Upload file
PH-00-0215	Mira-Nila Heritage House		Quezon City	26 Mariposa Street, Bagong Lipunan ng Crame		Upload file
PH-00-0216	Site of the Cry of Pugadlawin		Quezon City	Bahay Toro		Upload Photo
PH-00-0217	DND Social Hall		Quezon City	Department of National Defense, Camp Aguinaldo		Upload Photo
PH-00-0218	Church of the Holy Sacrifice		Quezon City	University of the Philippines Diliman		More images
PH-00-0219	Civil Service Commission Building		Quezon City	CSC Building, Batasan Hills		Upload Photo
PH-00-0220	First Television Broadcast in the Philippines		Quezon City	Mother Ignacia Street, South Triangle		Upload Photo
PH-00-0221	Libreria ni Juan Martinez		Quezon City	Mayon Street, Payatas		Upload Photo
PH-00-0222	Monument to the Heroes of 1896		Quezon City	University of the Philippines Diliman		Upload file
PH-00-0223	Philippine Medical Association		Quezon City	North Avenue, Santo Cristo		Upload file
PH-00-0224	Quezon Monument		Quezon City	Elliptical Road, Pinyahan		Upload file
PH-00-0225	Roseville College		Quezon City	E. Rodriguez Avenue corner Matimyas Street, Don Manuel		Upload Photo
PH-00-0226	San Francisco del Monte Church		Quezon City	69 San Pedro Bautista Street, Damayan		Upload file
PH-00-0227	Social Security System		Quezon City	East Avenue, Pinyahan		Upload file
PH-00-0228	St. Luke's Medical Center		Quezon City	E. Rodriguez Avenue, Kalusugan		Upload file
PH-00-0229	University of the Philippines Diliman		Quezon City	U.P. Campus		Upload file
PH-00-0230	Club Filipino		San Juan	Club Filipino Avenue, Greenhills		Upload file
PH-00-0231	Santo Cristo Church		San Juan	183 F. Blumentritt Street, Kabayanan		Upload file
PH-00-0232	El Deposito		San Juan	Pinaglabanan Road, Corazon de Jesus		Upload file
PH-00-0233	Pinaglabanan Shrine		San Juan	Pinaglabanan Road, Corazon de Jesus		Upload file
PH-00-0234	Santuario del Santo Cristo (San Juan del Monte Church)	Santuario del Sto. Cristo Church. Built in 1602–1604 by the Dominicans. Burned in 1638 during the Chinese uprising, the church and convent was reconstructed in 1641 but was burned again during the British Occupation of Manila in 1763. Reconstruction of the present church and convent were undertaken in 1774.	San Juan	183 F. Blumentritt Street, Kabayanan	14°35′54″N 121°01′50″E	Upload file
PH-00-0235	San Juan River Bridge		San Juan		14°36′06″N 121°01′13″E	Upload file
PH-00-0236	Almacen de Polvora		San Juan	San Juan Elementary School Compound, Rivera		Upload file
PH-00-0237	Libingan ng mga Bayani		Taguig	Carlos P. Garcia Avenue, Fort Bonifacio	14°31′14″N 121°02′35″E	Upload file
PH-00-0238	Felix Manalo Birthplace		Taguig	Calzada	14°32′02″N 121°04′45″E	Upload file
PH-00-0239	Metropolitan Citizens Military Training Command Headquarters (MCMTC)		Taguig	Fort Bonifacio		Upload Photo
PH-00-0240	Taguig Church	Saint Anne Parish Shrine	Taguig	General Antonio Luna Street, Santa Ana	14°31′37″N 121°04′26″E	Upload file

== See also ==
- List of historical markers of the Philippines in Metro Manila
