= Colegio del Buen Consejo =

Roman Catholic college in Pasig, Philippines

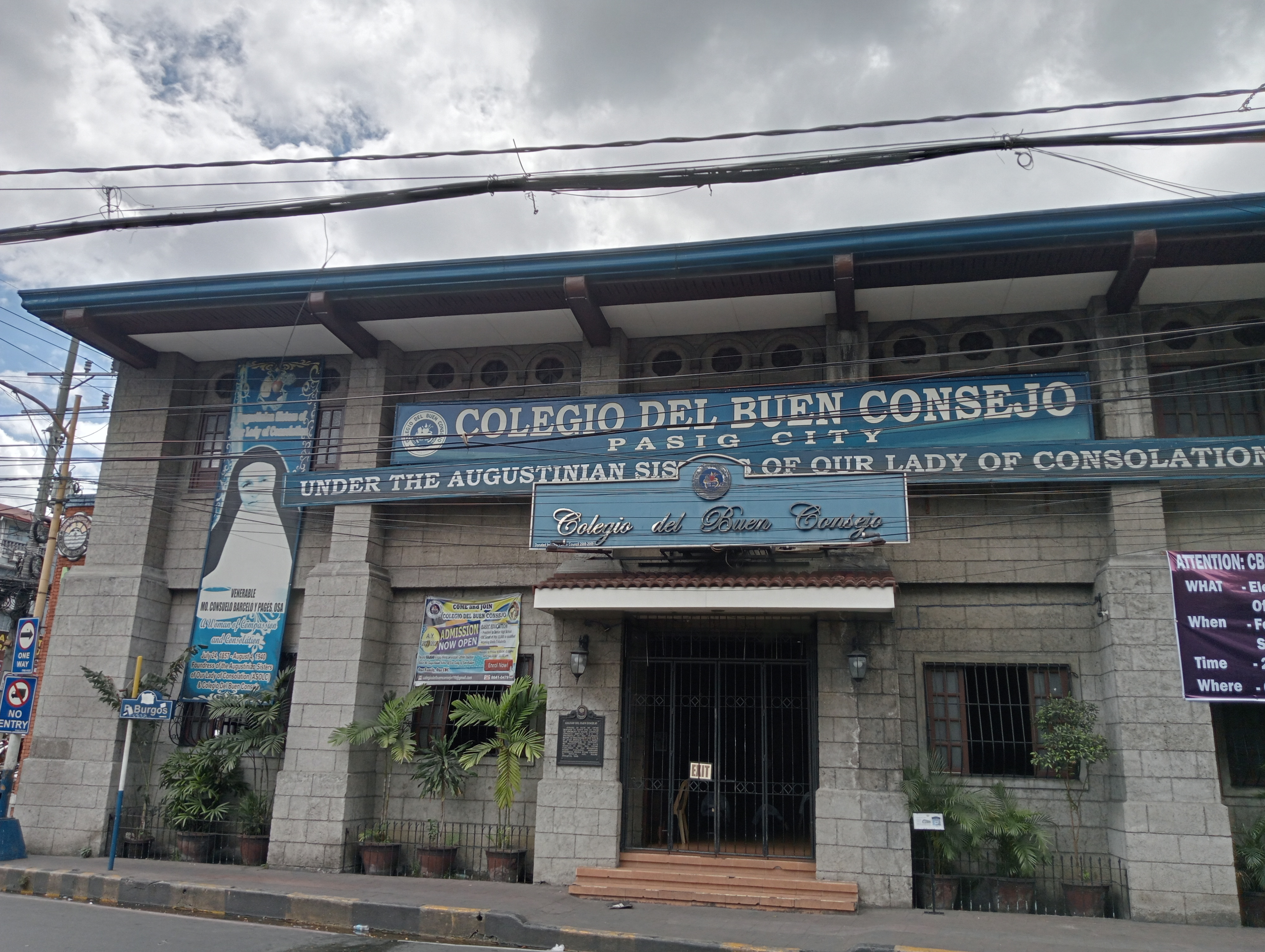
- Building's exterior
- Type: Private college
- Established: 1909
- Religious affiliation: Roman Catholic
- Location: Pasig, Manila, Philippines; 14°33′37″N 121°04′35″E
- Location in Metro Manila Location in Luzon Location in the Philippines

The Colegio del Buen Consejo is a private Catholic educational institution in Pasig, Metro Manila, Philippines, run by the Augustinian Sisters of Our Lady of Consolation. The college was founded in 1909 and replaced the previous school Beaterio de Santa Rita. The college's building was rebuilt in 1948 after being damaged in the Battle of Manila during World War II.

== Historical markers ==
The college hosts two historical markers. The National Historical Institute (NHI) installed a marker on the site in 2009.

In addition, the Historical Research and Markers Committee (HRMC), a predecessor of NHI, installed a marker in 1937 for Colegio De Madres Agustinas, a much earlier school exclusive for girls built in 1740 on the same location and damaged by an earthquake in 1880.

== Gallery ==
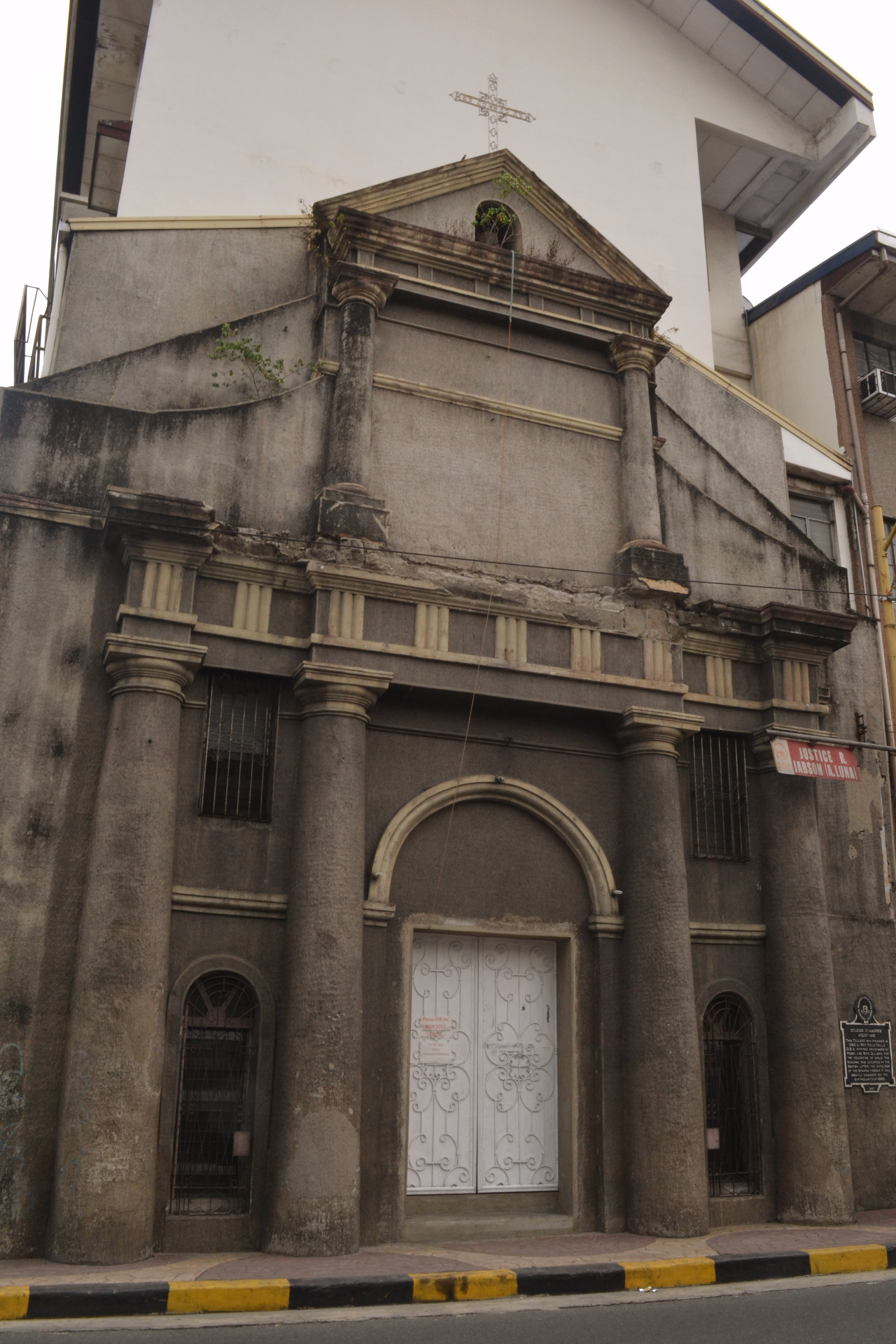
Colegio de Madres Agustinas facade

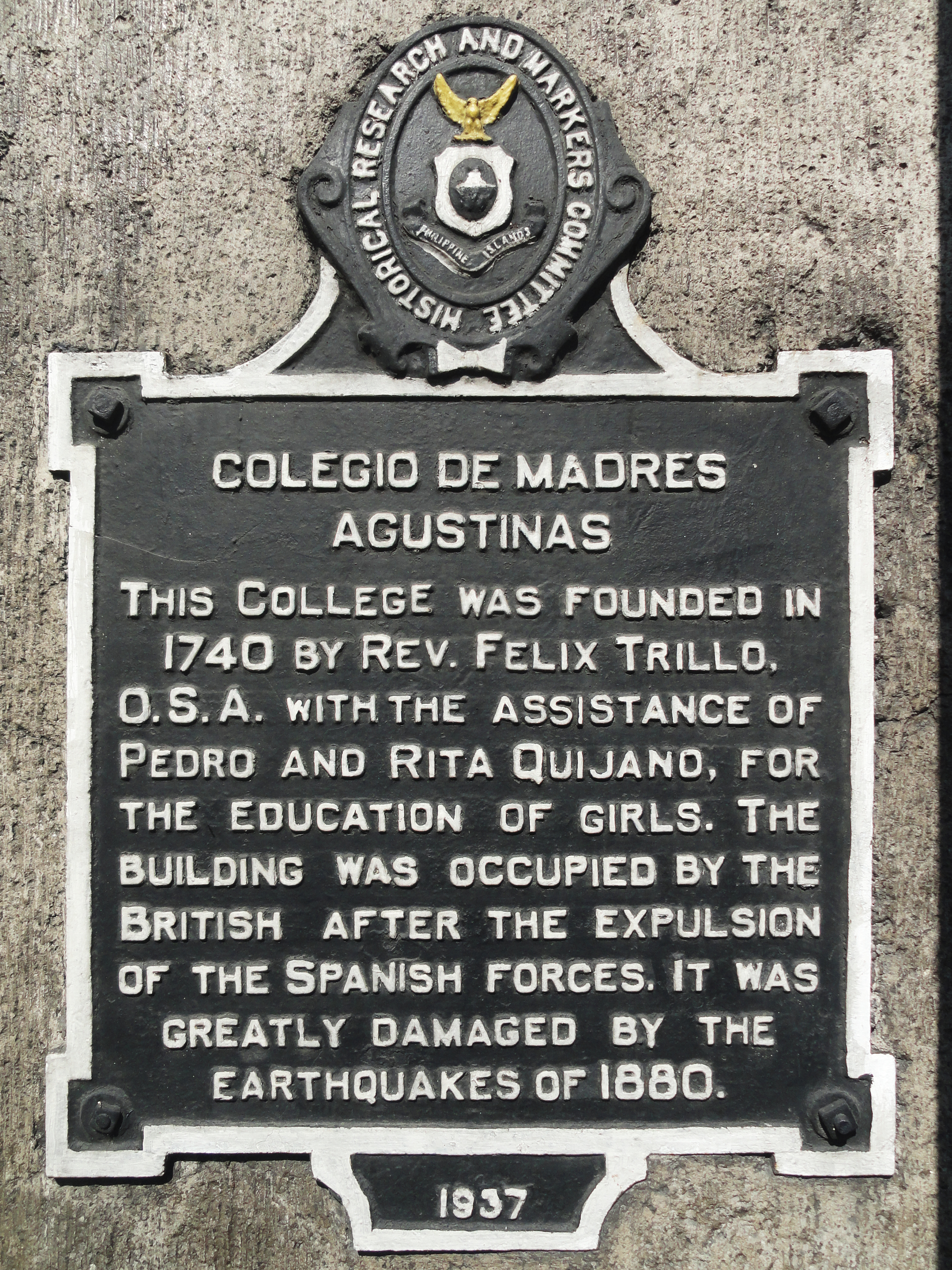
HRMC marker

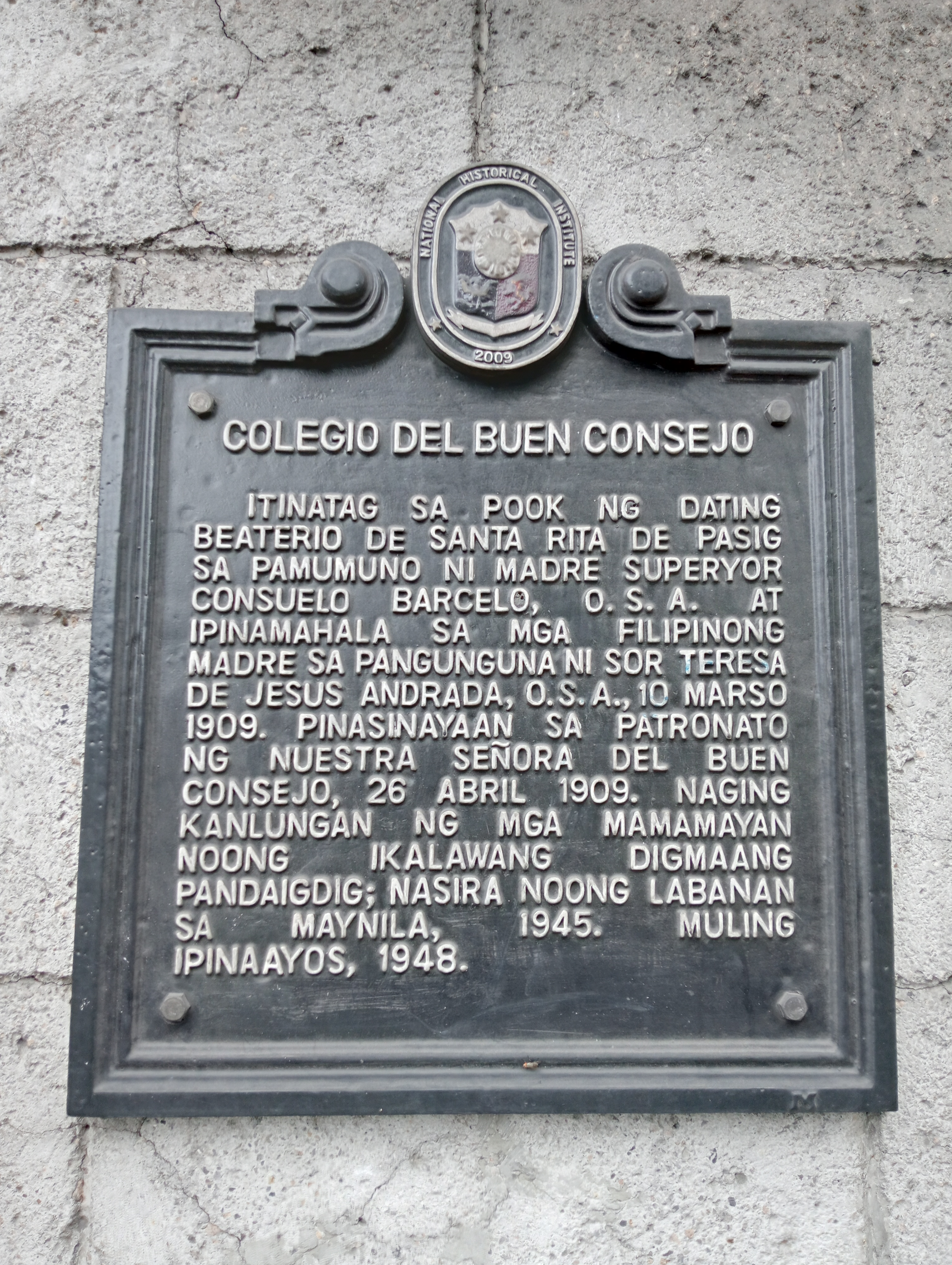
NHI marker
