= Tangos United Methodist Church =

Methodist church in Navotas, Philippines

Coordinates: 14°40′21″N 120°56′10″E

Tangos United Methodist Church was the first Methodist Church established by Juan and Pedro Pascual in 1900, in Navotas, Philippines.

== History ==
The first mass was conducted in 1902 by Simeon Blas at the house of Lucio Sanchez, when fifty pastors were also baptized. The first chapel was built in 1905 and was replaced in 1929. The building was created in the Neo-Gothic style.

== Programs and services ==
- Discipleship Training and Spiritual Formation
- Primary education
- Child sponsorship

== Notable events ==
=== 2009 fire ===
On August 3, 2009, a fire started in the main sanctuary of the church. It quickly spread to other parts of the church. Damage included exposure of wooden and steel structural members, burnt concrete walls, collapsed G.I. roofing, shattered stained glasses, and breakage of the concrete spire. The damage caused by the fire cost approximately 12 million pesos. The church has since been rebuilt.

=== Marker from the National Historical Institute ===
The marker of The United Methodist Church in Tangos, Navotas, was installed on May 5, 1985, in Navotas. Metro Manila. It was installed by the National Historical Institute.

=== Female bishops ===
In November 2022, Bishop Ruby-Nell M. Estrella was elected a bishop in The United Methodist Church. She began her ministry in 1987 when she volunteered as church secretary at Tangos UMC and was later ordained as a deacon there.

The United Methodist Church (Tangos, Navotas)
UNANG SANGAY NG SIMBAHANG METODISTA NA SINIMULAN NINA JUAN AT PEDRO PASCUAL SA NAVOTAS NOONG 1900. GINANAP ANG UNANG PAGSAMBA SA PANGUNGUNA NI SIMEON BLAS SA BAHAY NI LUCIO SANCHEZ AT BININYAGAN ANG UNANG 50 KAANIB NI PASTOR NICOLAS ZAMORA, 1902. IPINATAYO ANG UNANG KAPILYA, 1905; PINALITAN, 1929; AT ANG KASALUKUYANG KONKRETONG SIMBAHAN NA ITINALAGA SA PAGLILINGKOD NINA OBISPO J.K. MONDUL AT KAGALANG-GALANG JOSE GAMBOA, 1952-1965. NAGTAYO NG MGA KARAGDAGANG GUSALI: BAHAY PASTORAL, 1949; DR. MARVIN A. RADER MEMORIAL JUNIOR CHURCH, 1959, NA PINANGANLANG FLORENTINA DELA CRUZ PASCUAL MEMORIAL JUNIOR CHURCH, 1969; EDUCATIONAL BUILDING, 1980; AT MULTI-PURPOSE HALL, 1983. NAGTATAG NG MGA SAMAHANG SEKULAR TUNGO SA PAGKAKAISA AT PAGLILINGKOD-PANLIPUNAN. IPINAGDIWANG ANG IKA-85 TAON NG PAGKATATAG, MAYO 5, 1985.
