= Manila Aquarium =

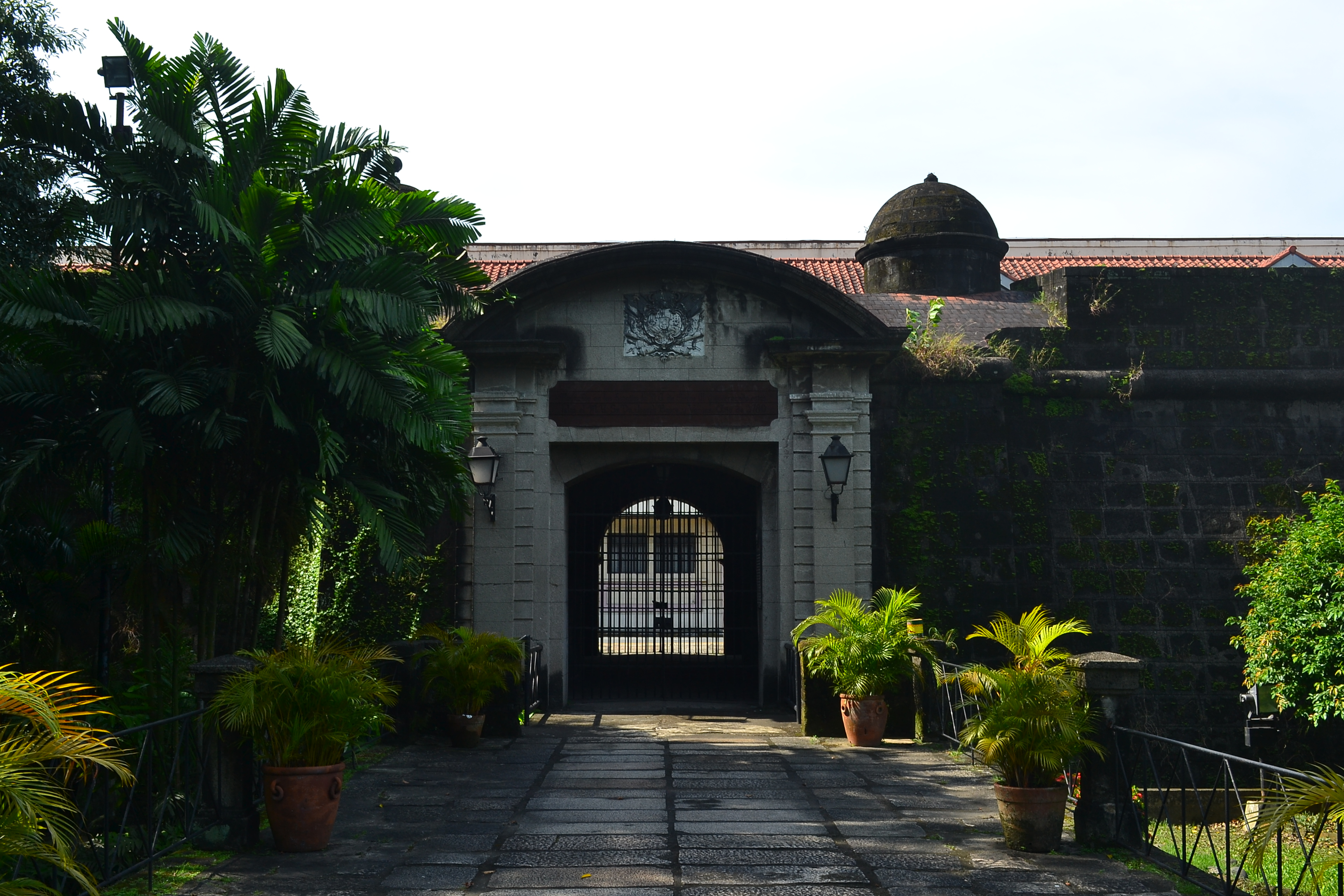
- Puerto Real, the former site of the aquarium
- Date opened: 1913
- Location: Puerto Real, Intramuros, Manila, Philippines

The Manila Aquarium was a public aquarium in Intramuros, Manila, Philippines.

== History ==
The structure which housed the Manila Aquarium was made by Miguel Antonio Gomez, an engineer, as part of the walled fortification in Manila, Intramuros. It was completed in 1771. In 1913 during the American colonial period. The structure sustained significant damage in February 1945 during the Battle of Manila of World War II.

President Diosdado Macapagal in the early 1960s pledged for the restoration of Intramuros' walls including the reconstruction of the Manila Aquarium.

The Manila Aquarium was re-established by the Zonta Club in 1968. The aquarium was closed in the 1980s. It opened again briefly as the Acuario de Manila.

== Facilities ==
During the American era, the Manila Aquarium was run by the Bureau of Science. It was housed inside a one-storey structure made of reinforced concrete and had a 85 m × 8 m (279 ft × 26 ft) tunnel. In 1916, there were 27 exhibition tanks installed within the corridor. The aquarium also had two large tanks outside the tunnel which can house crocodiles, sharks, and turtles. Among the aquatic wildlife featured in the Manila Aquarium during this period include sea anemones, crabs, sea urchins, and fishes.
