= Gates of Intramuros =

The gates of Intramuros refer to the original eight gates of the Walled City of Intramuros in Manila, built during the Spanish colonial era in the Philippines. The gates are called by the original Spanish word for "gate", puerta (plural: puertas).

== Gates facing the west ==
=== Puerta de Banderas ===
This gate was built in 1662 as the governor-general's gate when the first governor's palace was still located in Fort Santiago. It was destroyed during an earthquake and was never rebuilt.

=== Puerta de Postigo ===
Postigo means "postern" or a small gate in Spanish. This gate was named after the nearby Palacio del Gobernador. The first postigo was built several meters away but was walled up in 1662 when the present gate was constructed. The gate was then renovated in 1782 under the direction of military engineer Tomás Sanz. The gate led to the palaces of the governor-general and archbishop of Manila. The national hero José Rizal passed through this gate from Fort Santiago to his execution at Bagumbayan field on December 30, 1896. It was damaged in the Battle of Manila in 1945 and restored in 1968. The gate was excavated and restored from 1982 to 1983.

=== Puerta de Santa Lucia ===
Puerta de Santa Lucia, 1903

The gate is one of the original entrances to Intramuros when the walls were built in 1603. It underwent improvements in the late 18th century including the addition of two side chambers added during renovations under by Governor-General José Basco y Vargas (1778–1787). A wooden marker commemorating the gate's new appearance was later installed over the entrance. The Puerta de Santa Lucia became a popular access point to Malecón Drive, a promenade along the shore of Manila Bay. The whole gate was destroyed during the Battle of Manila in 1945 to allow the entry of American tanks and troops into the city. The side chambers were restored in 1968, and the gate itself was rebuilt in 1982.

== Gate facing the south ==
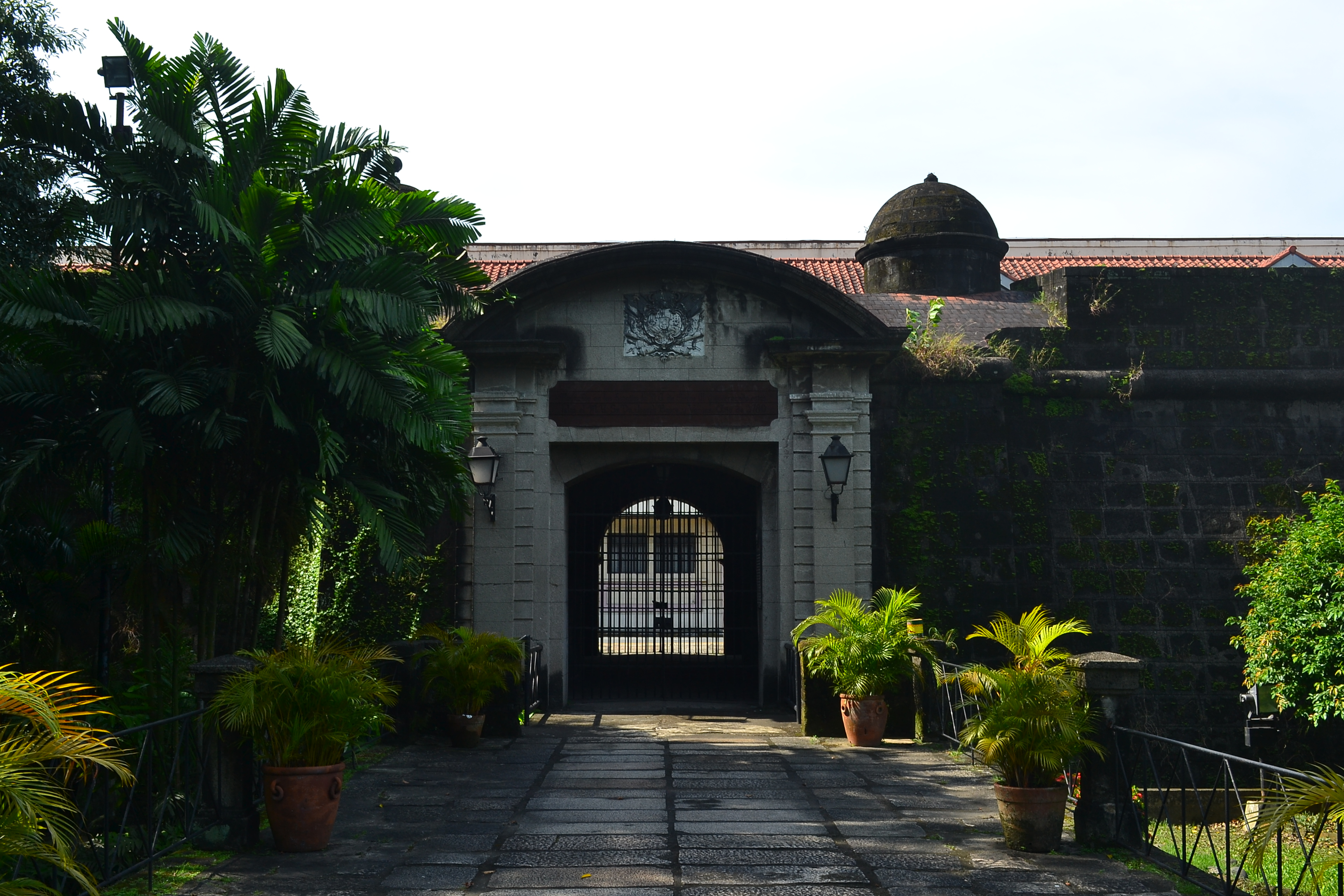
Puerta Real

=== Puerta Real ===
The original Real Gate (Royal Gate) was built in 1663 at the end of Calle Real de Palacio (now General Luna Street) and was used exclusively by the governor-general for state occasions. It was located west of the Baluarte de San Andrés and faced the old village of Bagumbayan. It was destroyed during the British invasion of 1762 along with the removal of the village. The Puerta Real was rebuilt in 1780 and moved further west to its present location as part of the new defense plan for Intramuros. During the Battle of Manila, the gate was damaged. It was restored in 1969 with additional work done in 1989.

== Gate facing the east ==
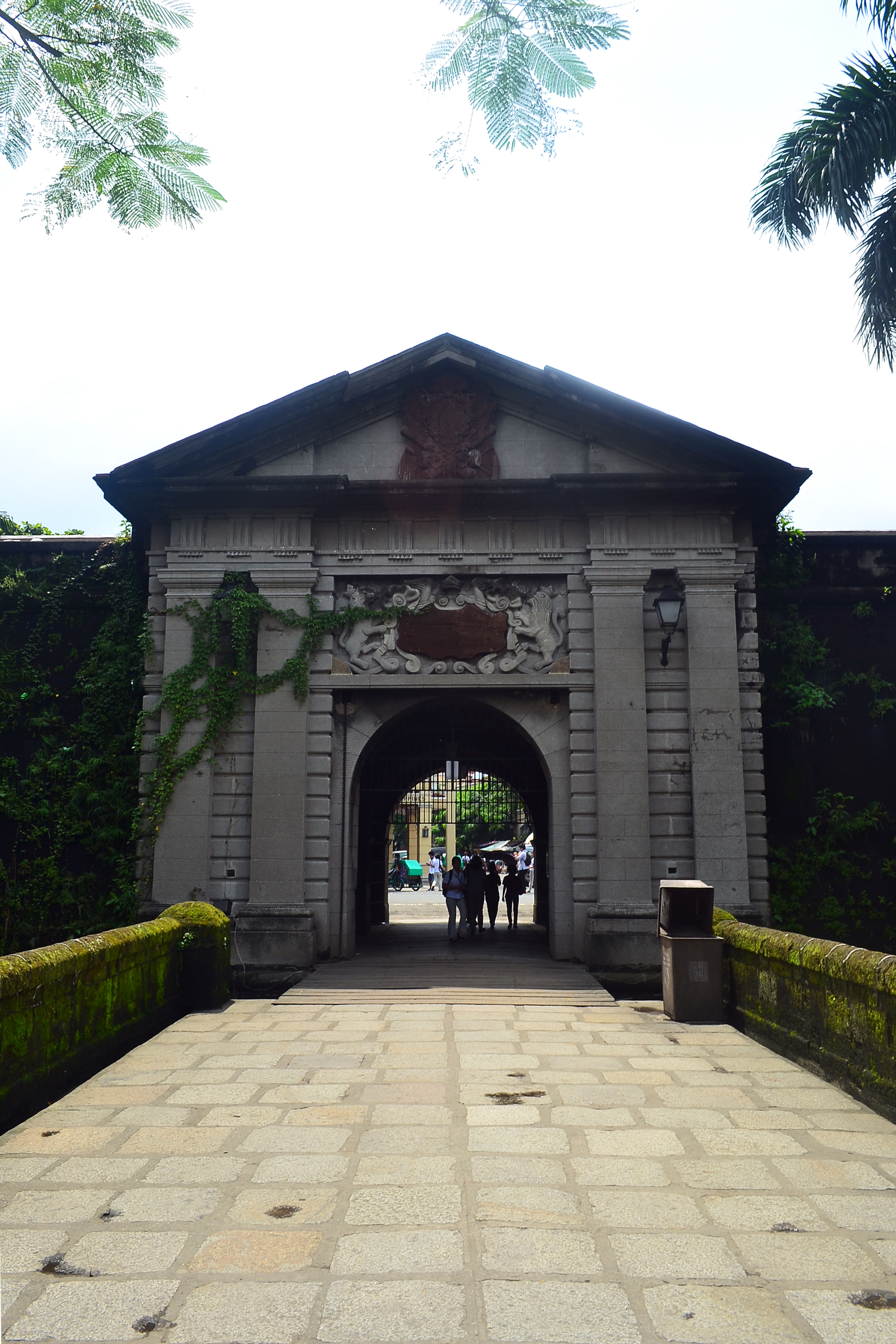
Puerta de Parian

=== Puerta del Parián ===
The gate was named after the "Parián de Arroceros", one of the earliest concentrations of Chinese merchants located across the city where the Metropolitan Theater now stands. Built in 1593, it is one of the earliest entrances to Intramuros. It became the official entrance of the governor-general in 1764, following the destruction of the Puerta Real during the British invasion. It was here that the newly appointed governor-general received the keys to the city from the Cabildo. The gate was severely damaged by artillery fire during the Battle of Manila. Restoration work began in 1967 and was completed in 1982.

== Gates facing the north ==
=== Puerta de Almacenes ===
It was built in 1690 for trading with the other side of the river and continually renovated until its completion in 1739. The gate lasted until 1903 when American military engineers demolished the walls for widening the river wharves along Intramuros.

=== Puerta de Santo Domingo/Puerta de Aduana ===
This gate named after the nearby old Santo Domingo Church, and built in the 18th century during the renovation of the riverside defenses. It opened to the river wharves, but American engineers tore down the gate and fortifications in 1903 to open a road to Intramuros from Magallanes Drive.

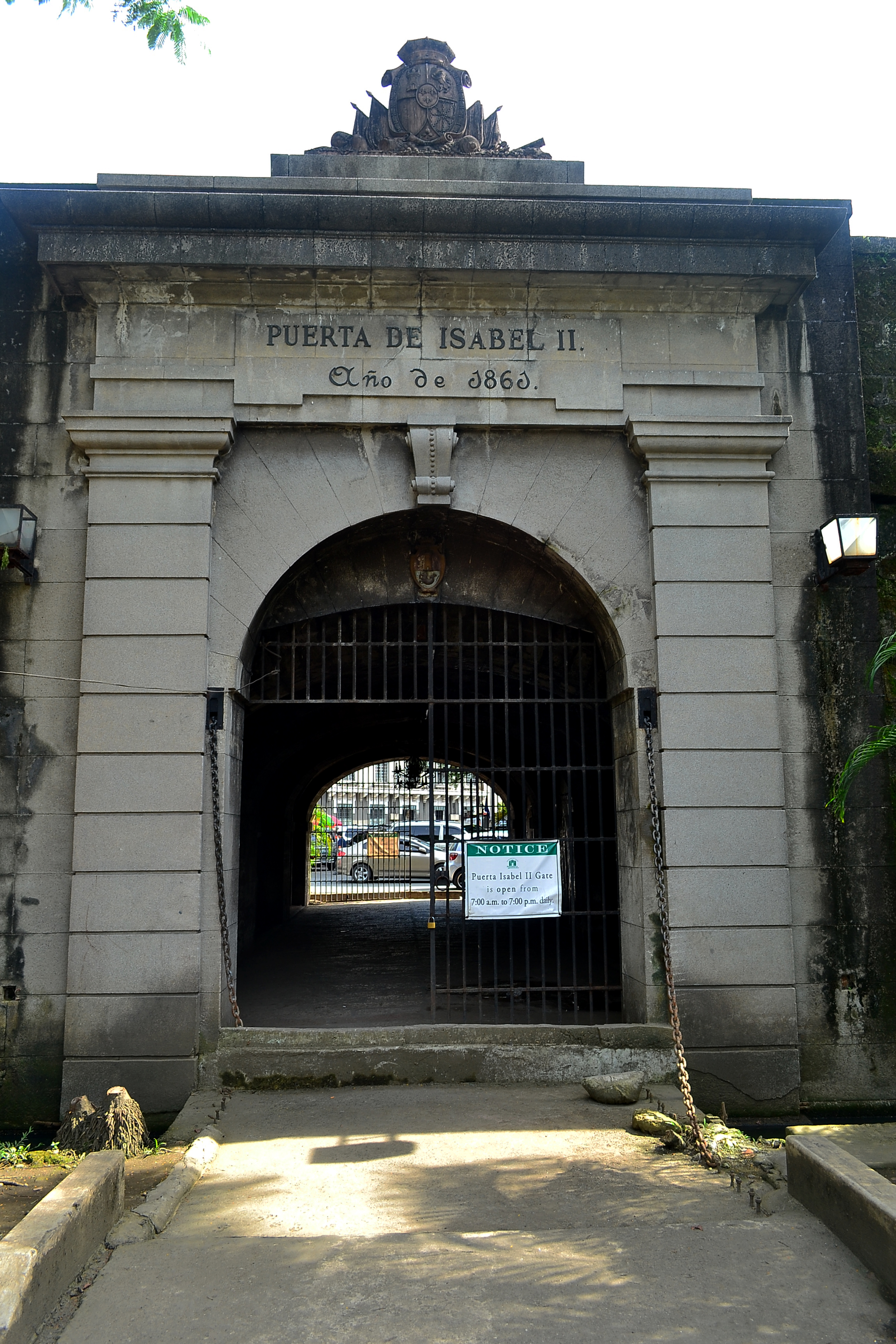
Puerta Isabel II

=== Puerta de Isabel II ===
The last gate to be built in Intramuros was opened in 1861 as a solution to the heavy pedestrian traffic outside Parian Gate to the Puente de España (Bridge of Spain) and Binondo. In front of it is the Queen Isabel II statue honoring the then-reigning Spanish monarch. The gate became part of the route of the tranvía (streetcar) system in 19th century Manila. It was damaged during the Battle of Manila in 1945 and was restored in 1966.

== Summary ==
	Name	Opened	Status	Notes
Facing west	Puerta de Santa Lucia	1603	Existing	Destroyed in 1945 Battle of Manila, rebuilt in 1982.
Facing west	Puerta de Bandera	1662	Destroyed	Governor-general's gate; Destroyed by earthquake
Facing west	Puerta de Postigo	1662	Existing	Renovated in 1782; Damaged in 1945 Battle of Manila, restored in 1968; Restored in 1982–83
Facing north	Puerta de Isabel II	1861	Existing	Destroyed in 1945 Battle of Manila, rebuilt in 1966
Facing north	Puerta de Almacenes	1690	Destroyed	Renovated and completed in 1739; Demolished in 1903 by American authorities for river wharves widening
Facing north	Puerta de Santo Domingo/Puerta de Aduana	18th century	Destroyed	Demolished in 1903 by American authorities for a road
Facing east	Puerta del Parián	1593	Existing	Destroyed in 1945 Battle of Manila, restored from 1967 to 1982
Facing south	Puerta Real	1663	Existing	Destroyed during British invasion of 1762, rebuilt 1780.; Destroyed in 1945 Battle of Manila, rebuilt in 1969
