= Kapitan Moy Residence =

Historic building in Marikina, Philippines

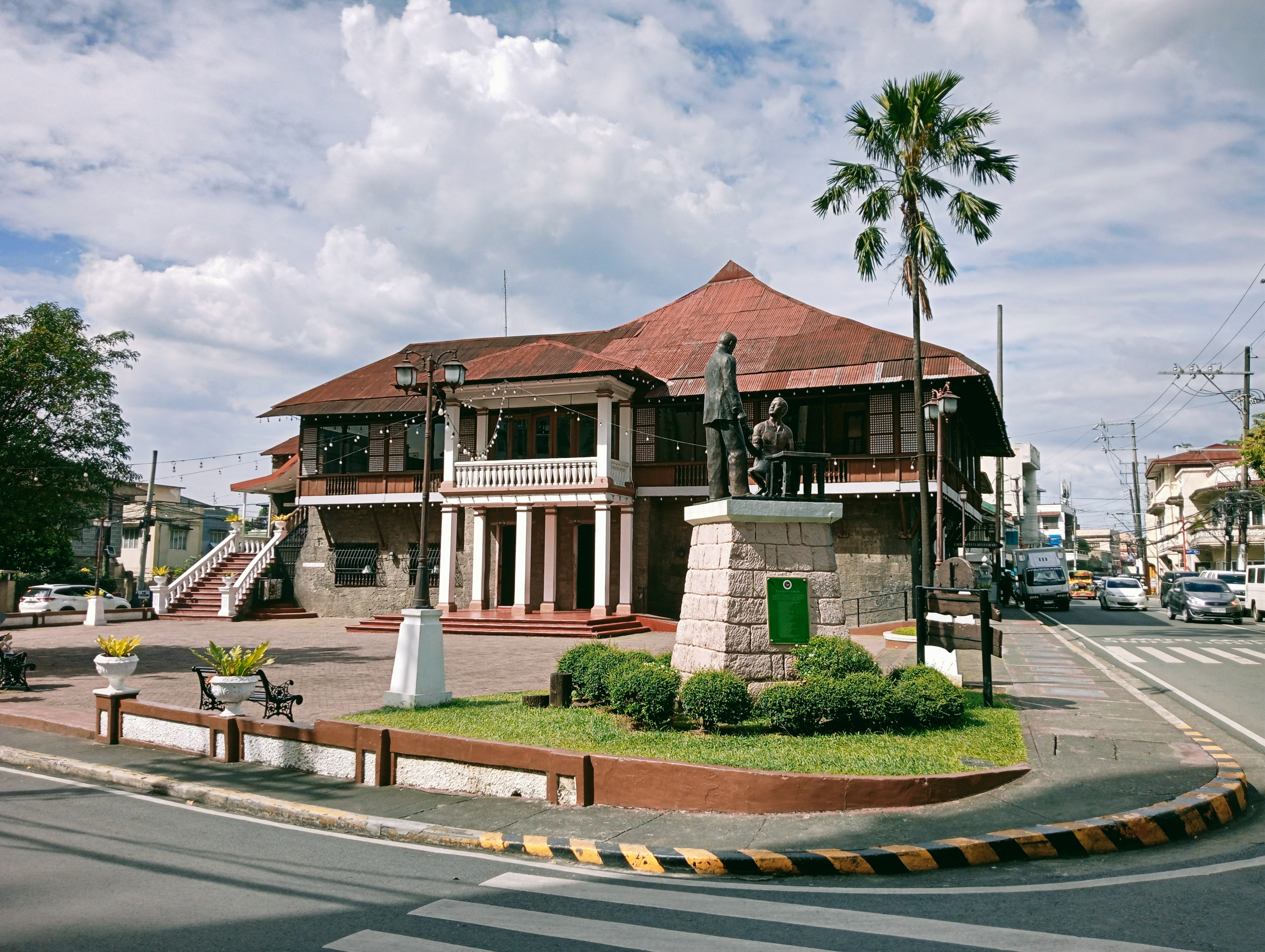

General information
- Architectural style: Bahay na bato
- Location: Marikina, Metro Manila, Philippines
- Coordinates: 14°37′50″N 121°05′44″E
- Completed: Before 1898

Kapitan Moy Building, also known as Cultural Center of Marikina situated in Marikina, Metro Manila, the Philippines, is the 200-year-old house of Don Laureano Guevarra (July 4, 1851 – December 30, 1891), known as the founder of the Marikina shoe industry. Also known as Kapitan Moy, he served as capitan municipal in the former municipality. A historical marker honoring him as the "Pioneer of the Shoe-making Industry in Marikina" was installed at his birthplace in 1970. Presently, there are two restaurants found in the ground floor of the Kapitan Moy Building and these are Café Kapitan Restaurant and Kusina ni Kambal. At the Café Kapitan Restaurant is an old well which serves as a décor and a wishing well to customers.

== History ==
=== Don Laureano "Kapitan Moy" Guevara ===
Guevara was the fifth child of businessman Jose Emiterio Guevara of Quiapo, Manila and Timotea Mariquita Andres. His father established the shop named La Industrial in Escolta, Manila—a bazaar, printing prist lithography shop, and firearms dealer rolled into one. The business sustained the Guevara family well enough that his parents were able to send his brother Remigio to study in Paris, France. Guevara learned the pro's and con's of reading and writing from his family. Later on, he was enrolled in the Ateneo Municipal but it appears that he did not finish his education. He was more interested in what was practical and immersed himself in the family business. Together with his other brothers, he left the family home in Marikina very early in the morning to deliver and sell their products in Manila before sunrise. It was said that Guevara observed the economic conditions of the people of Marikina and set about finding a solution and target.

=== Marikina Shoe Industry ===
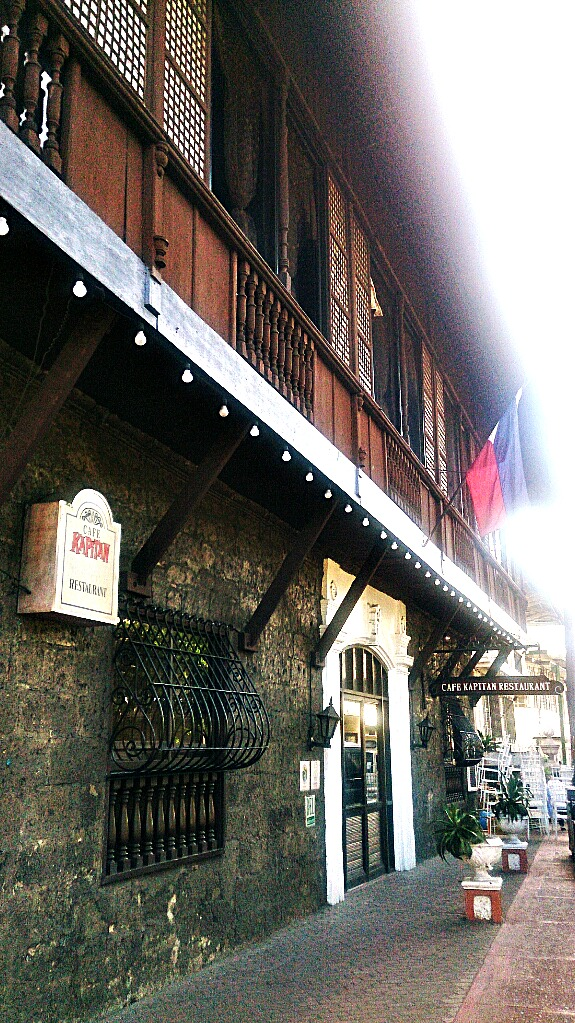
Street view of Kapitan Moy Bdlg.

In 1887, Marikina emerged as a town of shoemakers through the pioneering efforts of Don Laureano "Kapitan Moy" Guevara. When the soles of Kapitan Moy's own imported shoes broke, he tried to personally fix his shoes and started experimenting with shoemaking because he did not want to go all the way to Manila. Although some Marikenos were already engaged in the limited production of slippers and clogs, or bakya even before the coming of the Spaniards, only the Chinese located in Manila were engaged in shoe repair and manufacture at that time.

To get an idea on how to fix his broken shoes, Kapitan Moy disassembled its parts, studying closely the intricacies of how the shoes fit together. Tiburcio "Busyong" Eustaquio, a wooden clog or bakya maker provided Kapitan Moy with shoe lasts to help him discover how shoes were made. Since Kapitan Moy had no background in shoemaking, the tools he used in making the first Marikina shoes were borrowed from blacksmiths in Marikina and Pasig. After several unsuccessful attempts, Kapitan Moy finally produced the first pair of shoes that would inspire the whole town to embark on the new industry of shoemaking.

Together with some local residents such as Gervacio Carlos, Venancia Santiago, Ambrosio Sta. Ines, and Sixto Isidro, Kapitan Moy discovered the proper method of making footwear and started an industry that supported the livelihood of an entire town for decades to come. Sixto Andres, using Spanish shoe catalogues, became the first Marikeno shoe designer.

The first shoe lasts which Kapitan Moy imported from Barcelona were too pointed so they were remodeled to conform to the shoe style prevailing in the Philippines during the period. At that time, slippers and wooden clogs were already being made in his silong (ground floor used for storage and garage in old houses; living quarters were on the second floor). Converting this into a small shoe factory Kapitan Moy employed fishermen, farmers and women during the non-harvest season. During the planting season they would till soil, then while the harvest was growing they would make shoes. When Kapitan Moy died, he left Marikina a legacy, a source of livelihood for its people. Thus shoes were made in the silong (basements) of the houses or in kubos (huts) near the living quarters.

=== Kapitan Moy Building ===
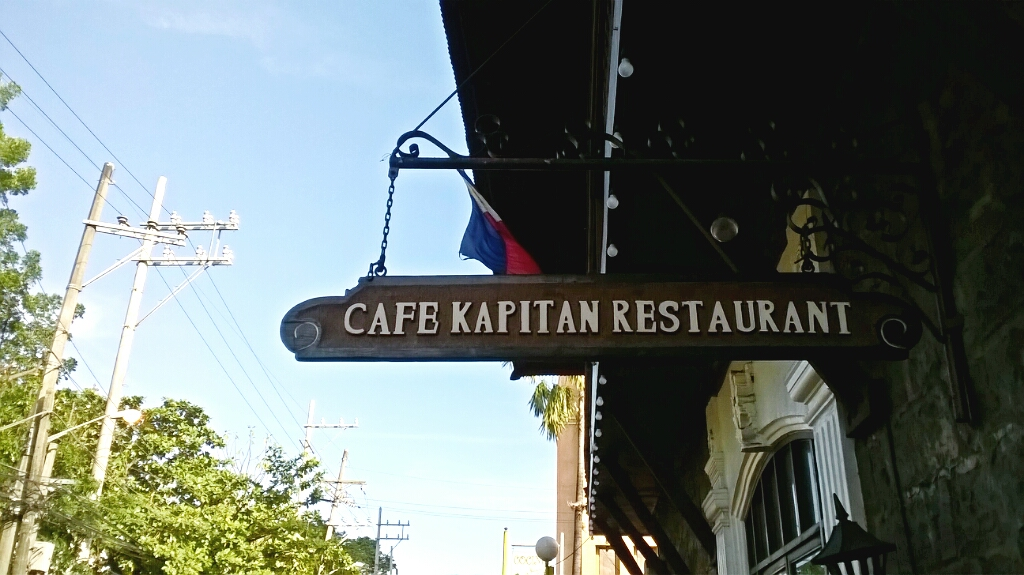
Cafe Kapitan Restaurant at the Ground Floor of Kapitan Moy building

From a shoe house, it was converted to become the home of needy residents of Marikina. At this time, Doña Teresa dela Paz was actively engaged in philanthropic services for the poor and underprivileged. She bought the house of Kapitan Moy to serve the needs of the marginal sector of the community. The haciendera presented the dwelling of the Kapitan to his brother-in-law Don Jose Espiritu. Eventually, it was transformed into a primary school in 1907-1955 and many years later, the local government of Marikina developed it to be the city’s cultural center.

The building also served as the house of the American tribunal when the Americans occupied the Philippines. When the Japanese came over in 1942 to 1945, it became the Japanese Imperial Army’s headquarters. Kapitan Moy building now houses two restaurants: Cafe Kapitan Restaurant and Cocina. It is also a venue for seminars, conventions and other events. The Bulwagang Bayani, located on the 2nd floor, is fully air-conditioned and can house 400-450 guests. The Plaza Kapitan may also be rented for different occasions.

On September 14, 2018, the building was damaged by a tornado in Marikina, a day before Typhoon Mangkhut (Ompong) struck Cagayan Valley, disrupting the wedding reception held at the building.

== Cultural heritage designations ==
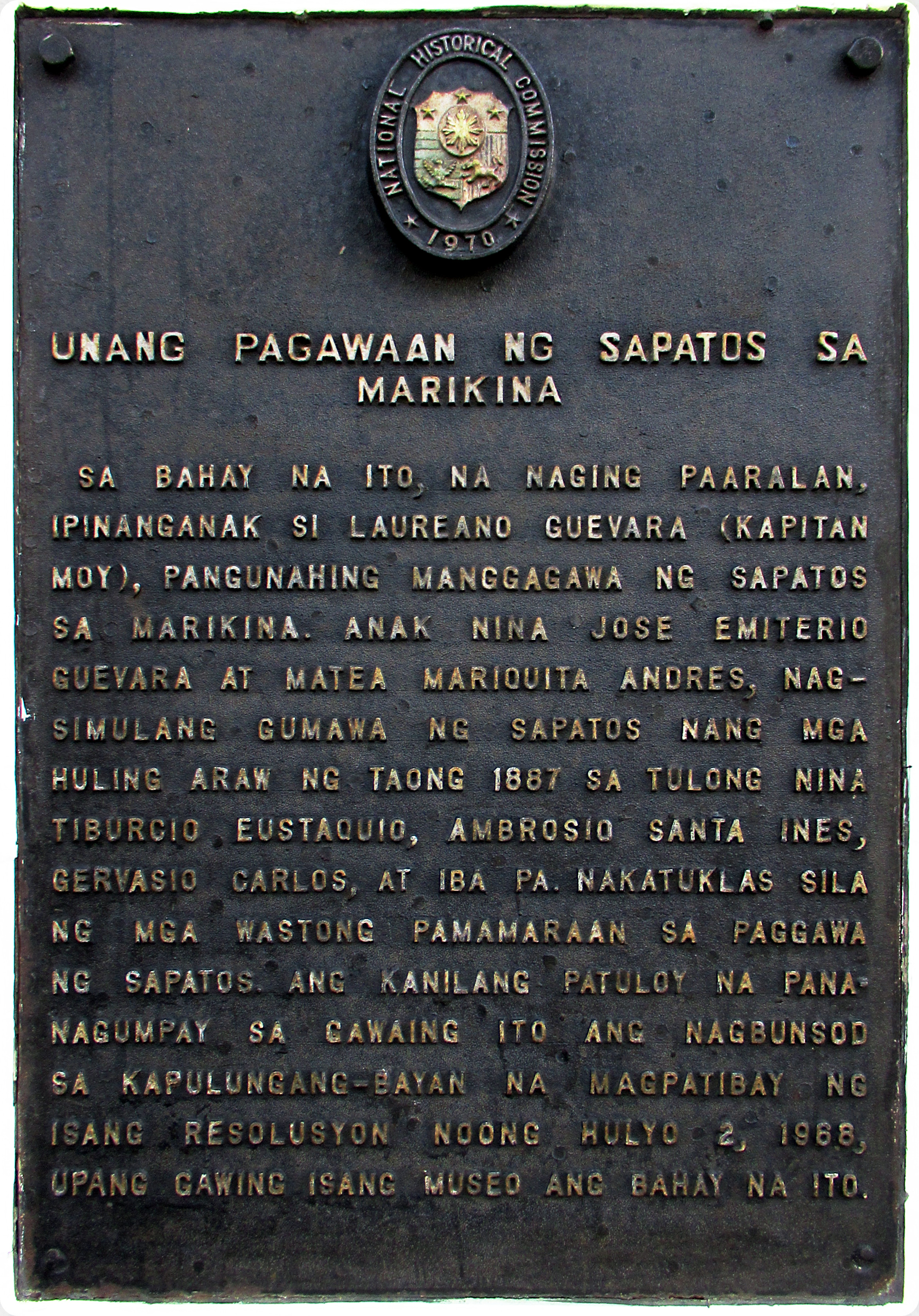
Marker of Unang Pagawaan ng Sapatos sa Marikina

On April 16, 1970, the building was commemorated with a cast-iron plaque marker and listed as a Historic Site and Structure by the National Historical Commission of the Philippines (NHCP) for being the Unang Pagawaan ng Sapatos sa Marikina or the First Shoe Workshop in Marikina. It is also recognized as a Cultural Property of the Philippines by the National Commission on Culture and the Arts, National Historical Commission of the Philippines, and the National Museum of the Philippines. It was also declared a National Shrine in 1968 by the municipal council and NHCP, as well as Sentrong Pangkultura ng Marikina or the Cultural Center of Marikina by the Marikina local government on April 16, 1986.

== Gallery ==
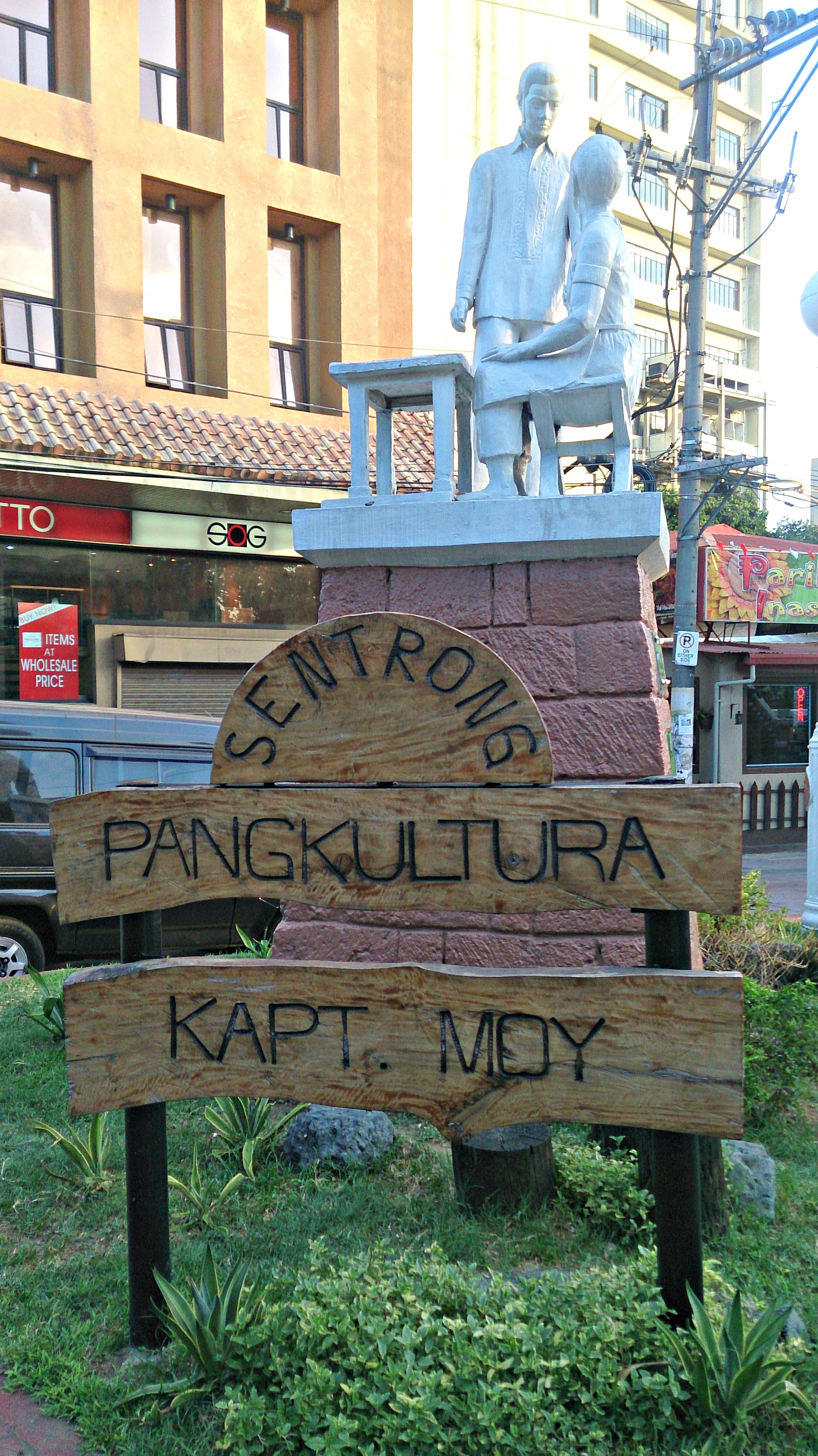
Sentrong Pangkultura ng Marikina

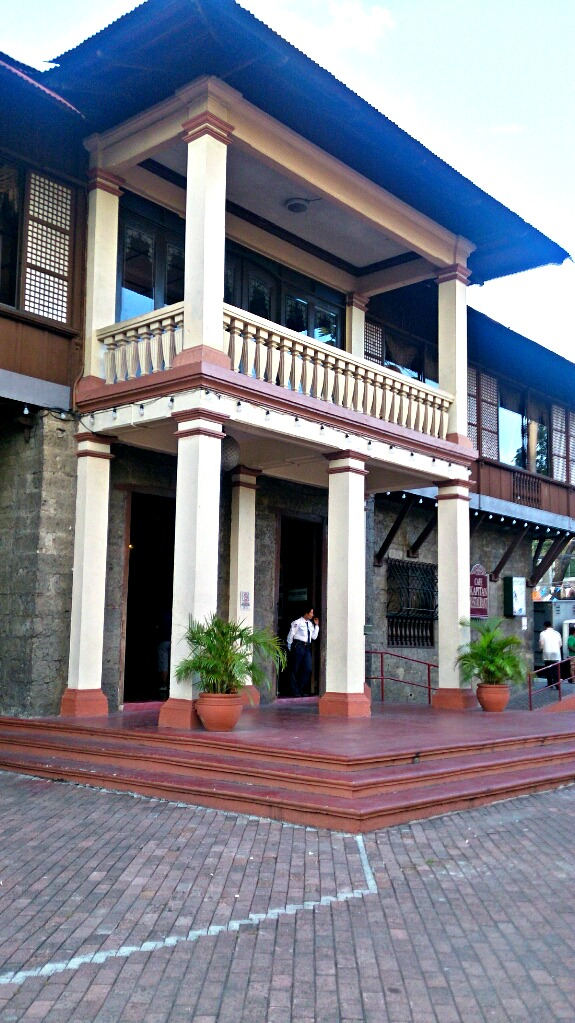
Kapitan Moy Building Patio

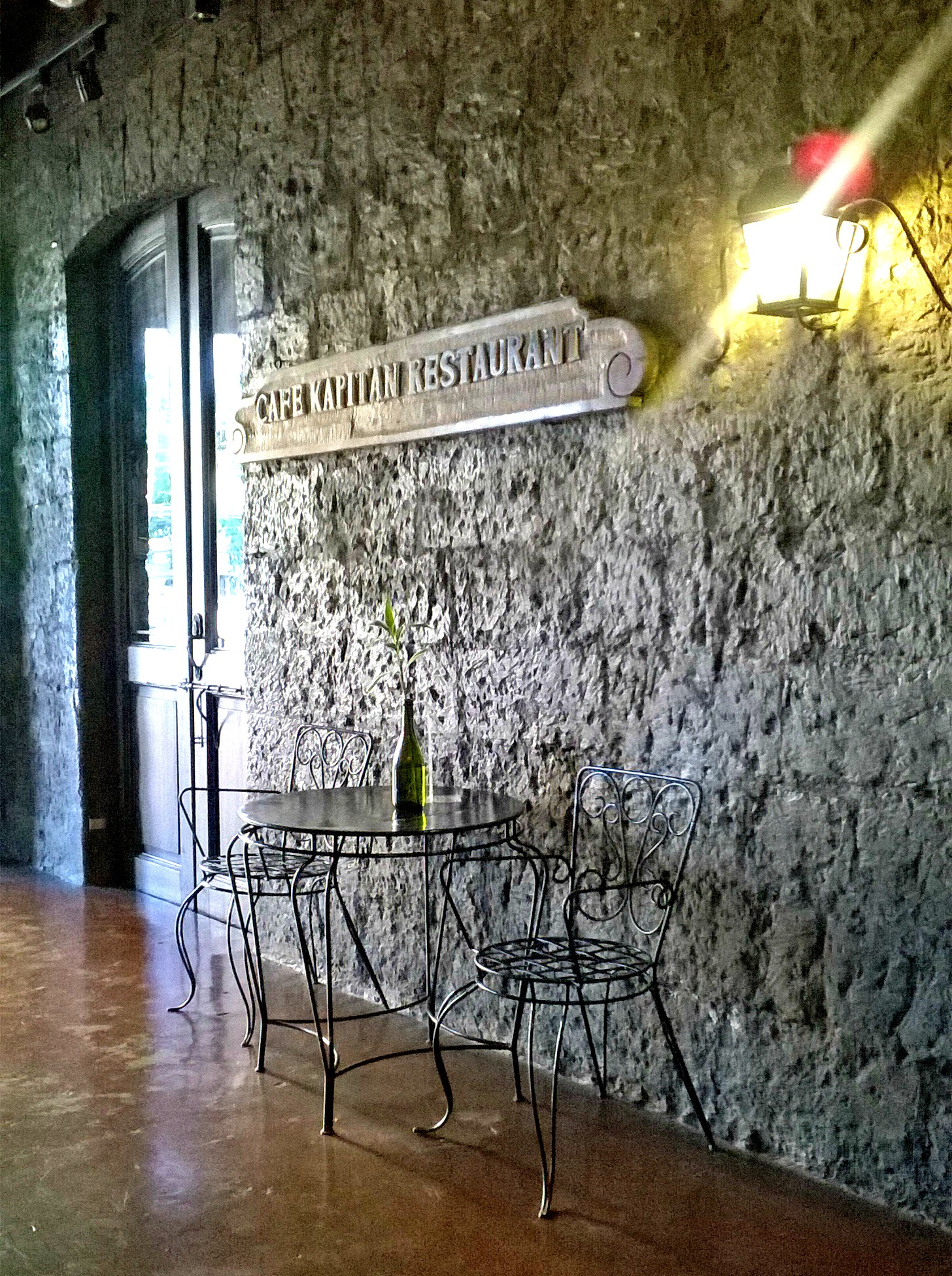
Cafe Kapitan Restaurant Foyer

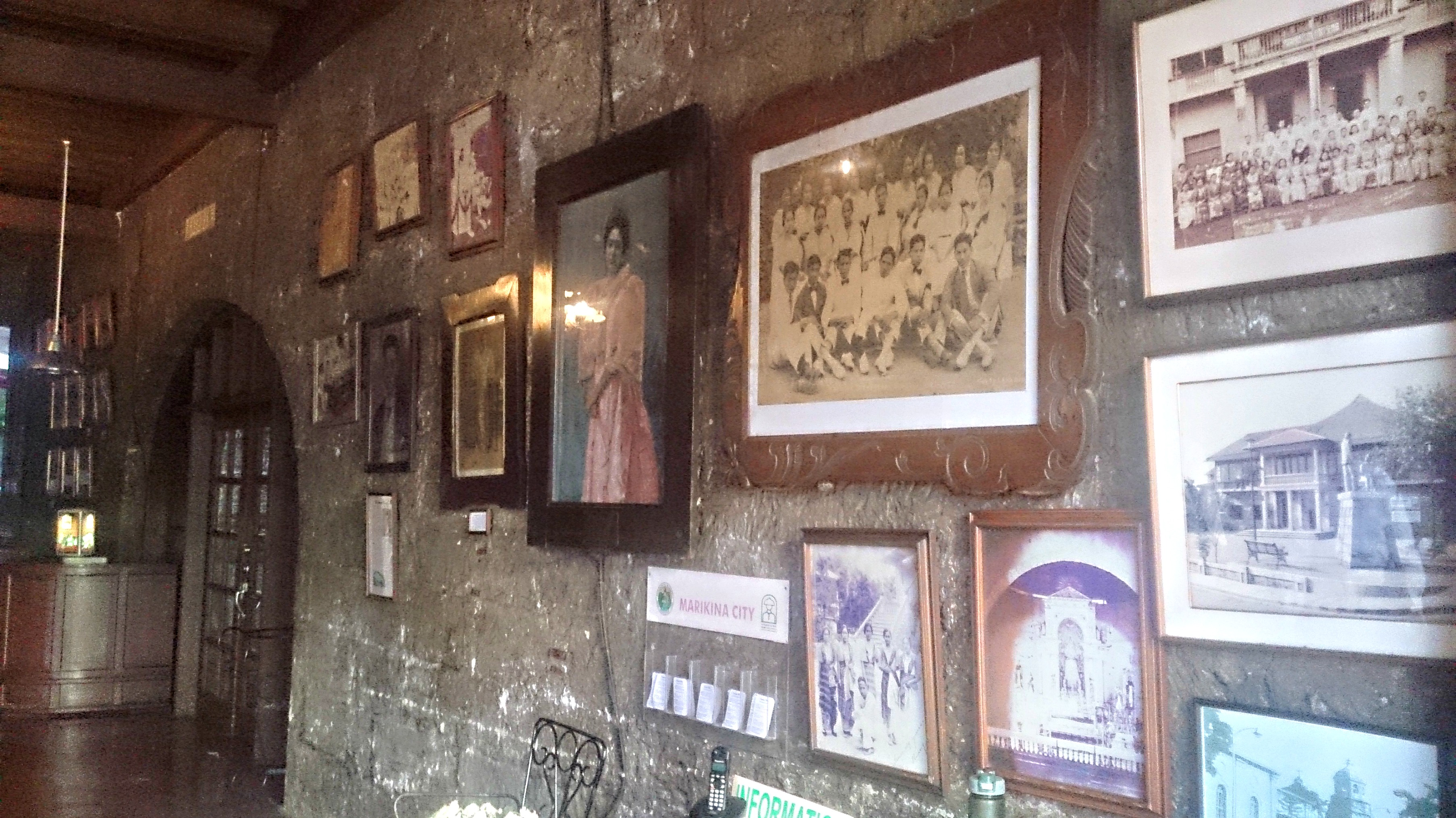
Memorabilias of Kapitan Moy Building

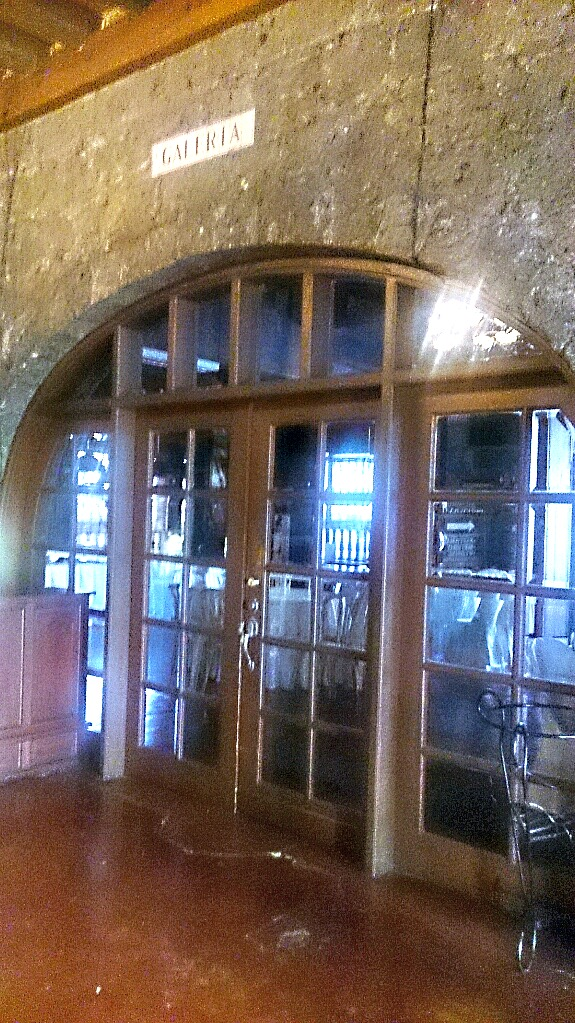
Entrance to the Galeria of Kapitan Moy Building

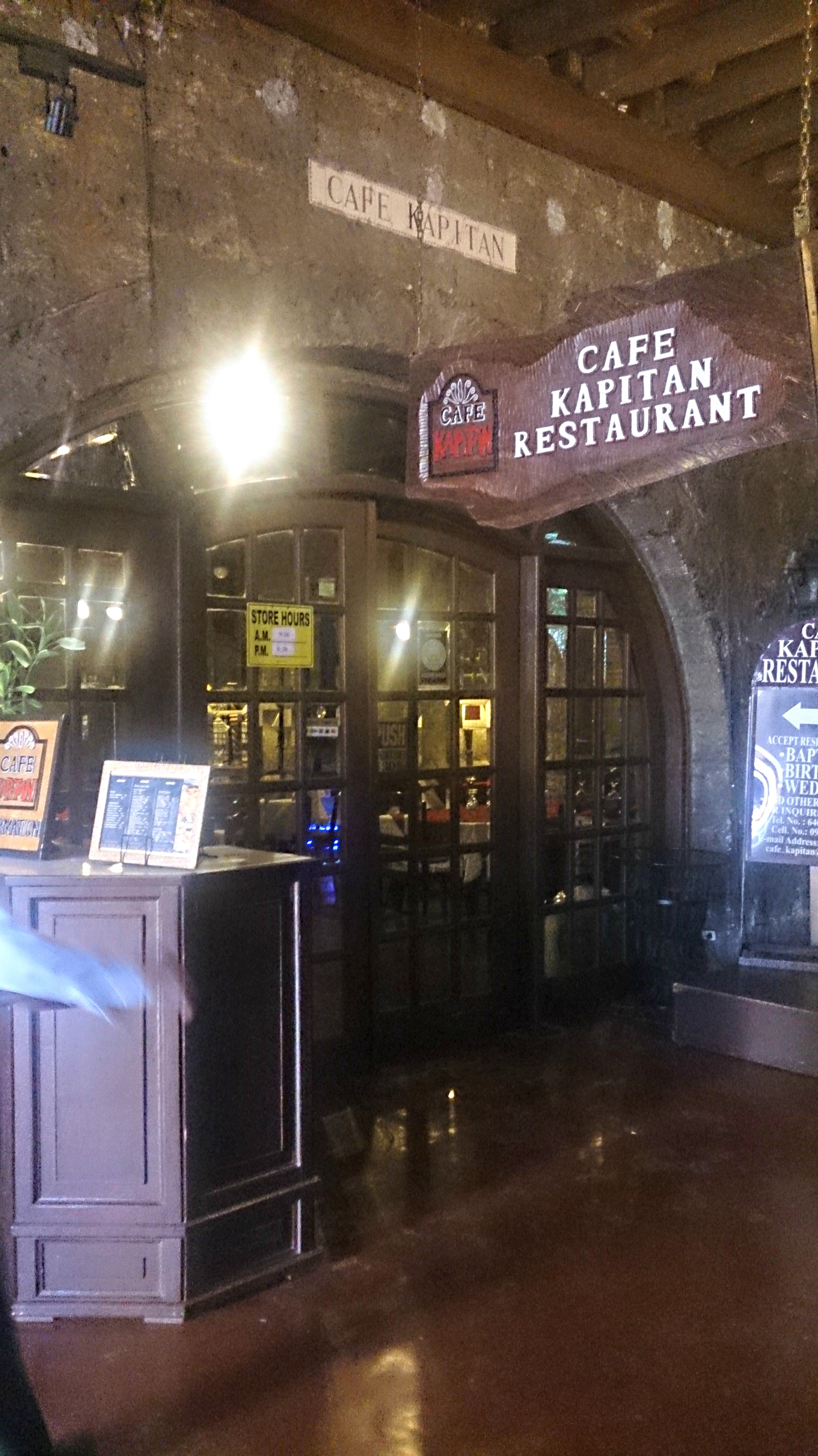
Entrance of Cafe Kapitan Restaurant

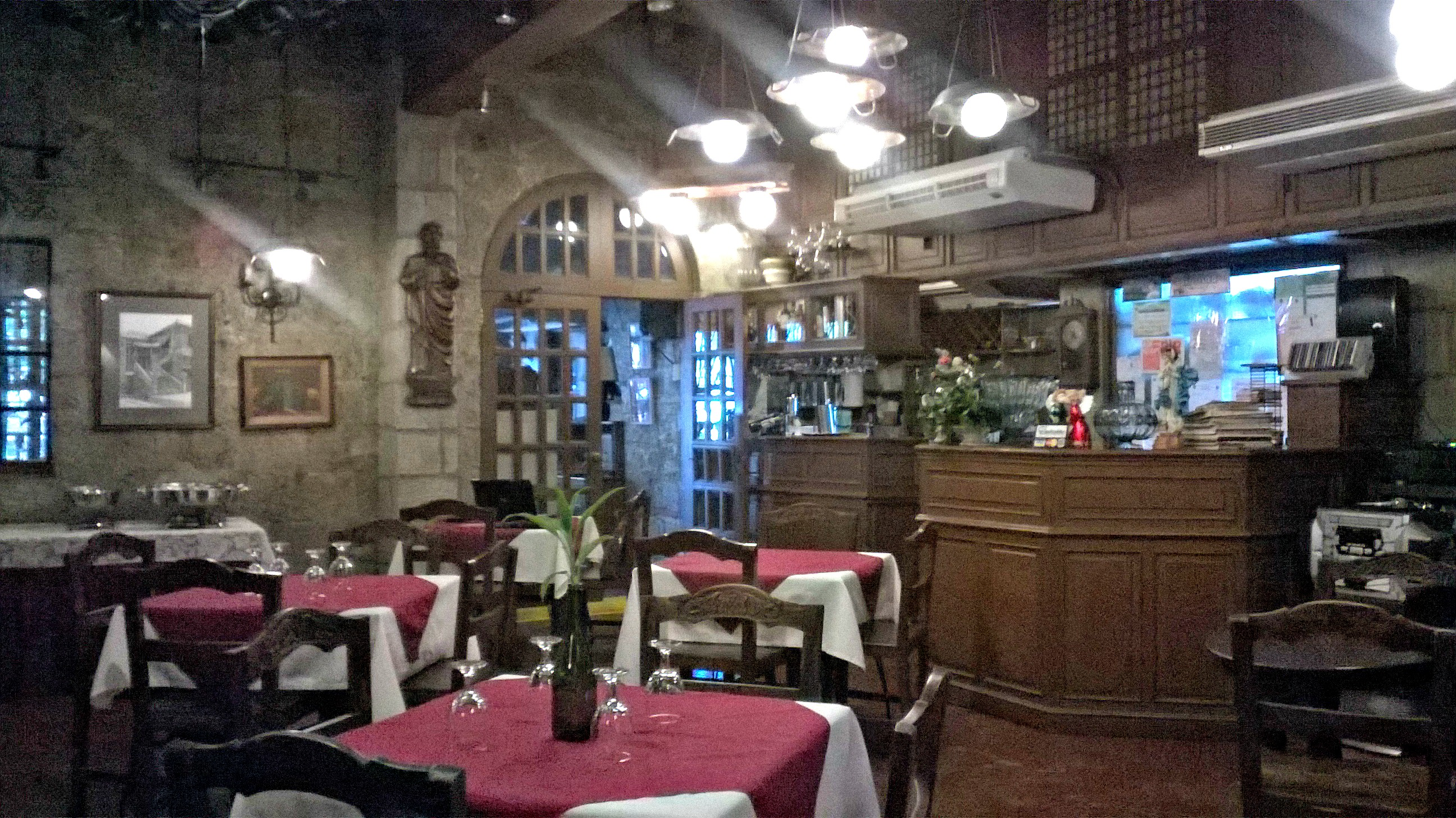
Cafe Kapitan Restaurant

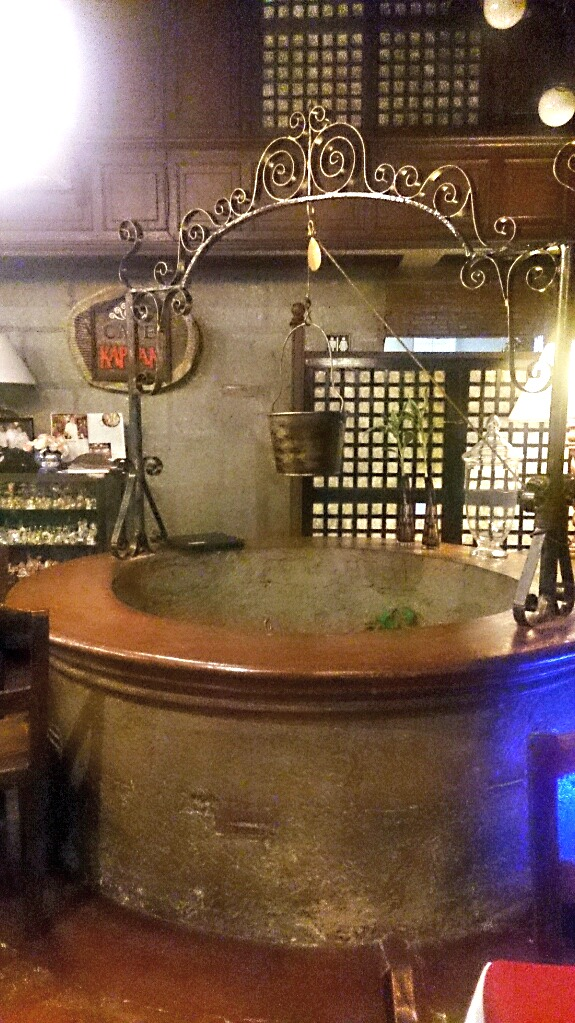
Old Well at Kapitan Moy Building

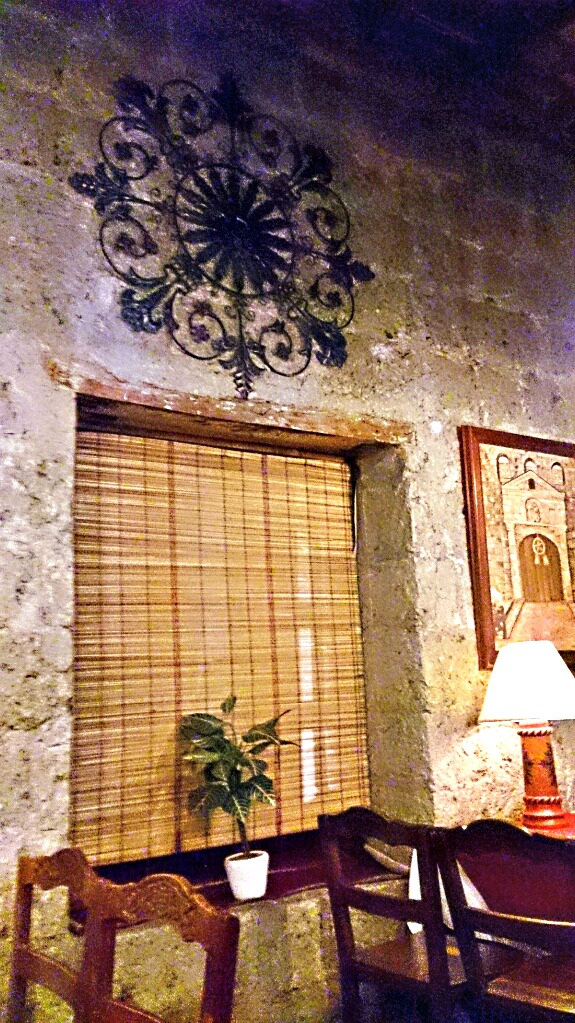
Interior of Cafe Kapitan Restaurant

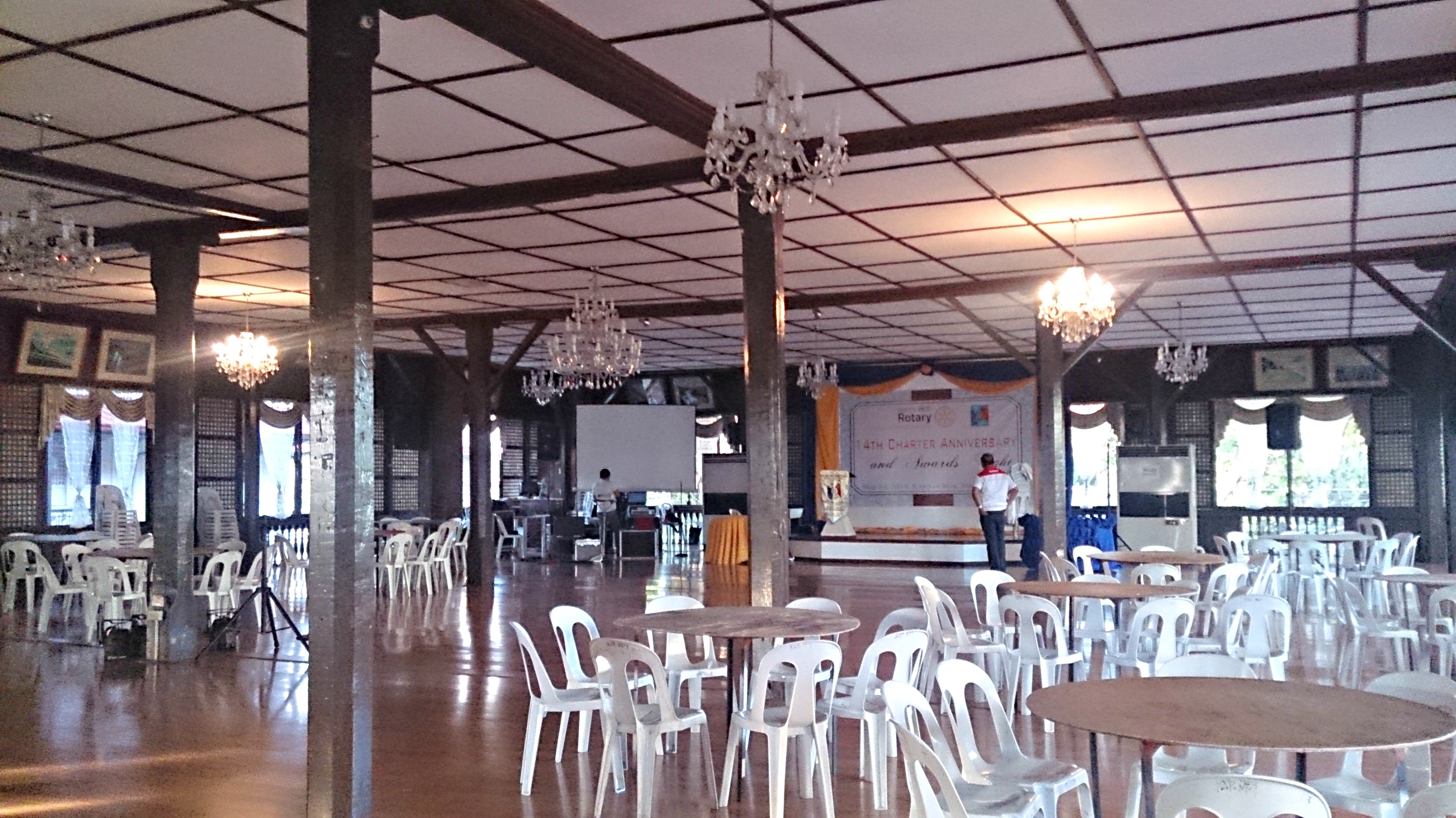
Bulwagan at Kapitan Moy Building
